= Sayn =

German county of the Holy Roman Empire

Coordinates: 50°26′18″N 7°34′35″E

County of Sayn Grafschaft Sayn
- 11th century–1605
- Coat of arms

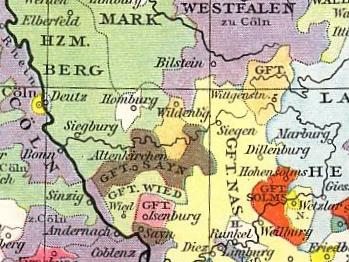
- Sayn c. 1450
- Status: State of the Holy Roman Empire
- Capital: Sayn (in German)
- Government: Principality
- Historical era: Middle Ages
  - Established: before 1139 11th century
  - To Counts of Sponheim: 1247
  - Partitioned into S-Sayn and S-Vallendar: 1294
  - Partitioned into S-Sayn, S-Berleburg and S-Wittgenstein: 1605
  - S-Wittgenstein partitioned into S-W-Sayn-Altenkirchen and S-W-Hachenburg: 1648
Preceded by
Duchy of Franconia
Succeeded by
Sayn-Berleburg
Sayn-Sayn
Sayn-Wittgenstein
- Today part of: Germany

Sayn was a small German county of the Holy Roman Empire which, during the Middle Ages, existed within what is today Rheinland-Pfalz.

There have been two Counties of Sayn. The first emerged in 1139 and became closely associated with the County of Sponheim early in its existence. Count Henry II was notable for being accused of satanic orgies by the Church's German Grand Inquisitor, Conrad von Marburg, in 1233. Henry was acquitted by an assembly of bishops in Mainz, but Conrad refused to accept the verdict and left Mainz. It is unknown whether it was Henry's Knights who killed Conrad on his return to Thuringia, but investigation was foregone due to the cruelty of Conrad, despite Pope Gregory IX ordering his murderers to be punished. With the death of Henry in 1246, the County passed to the Counts of Sponheim-Eberstein and thence to Sponheim-Sayn in 1261.

The second County of Sayn emerged as a partition of Sponheim-Sayn in 1283 (the other partition being Sayn-Homburg). It was notable for its numerous co-reigns, and it endured until 1608 when it was inherited by the Counts of Sayn-Wittgenstein-Sayn. A lack of clear heirs of William III of Sayn-Wittgenstein-Sayn led to the temporary annexation of the comital territories by the Archbishop of Cologne until the succession was decided. In 1648 following the Thirty Years' War, the County was divided between Sayn-Wittgenstein-Sayn-Altenkirchen and Sayn-Wittgenstein-Hachenburg.

== Territory and possessions ==
The county of Sayn was located in the area of today's state of Rhineland-Palatinate. The ancestral land, lost in 1605, was on the right bank of the Middle Rhine around Sayn Castle, now part of the town of Bendorf. The much larger territories were in the northern Westerwald and in the middle Sieg Valley. The county had as neighbours:

- in the north, the Lordship of Humburg
- in the east, the County of Nassau-Dillenburg,
- in the south, the County of Wied,
- south of the exclave of Bendorf, the Electorate of Trier,
- north of the exclave of Bendorf, the County of Isenburg
- in the west, the Electorate of Cologne.
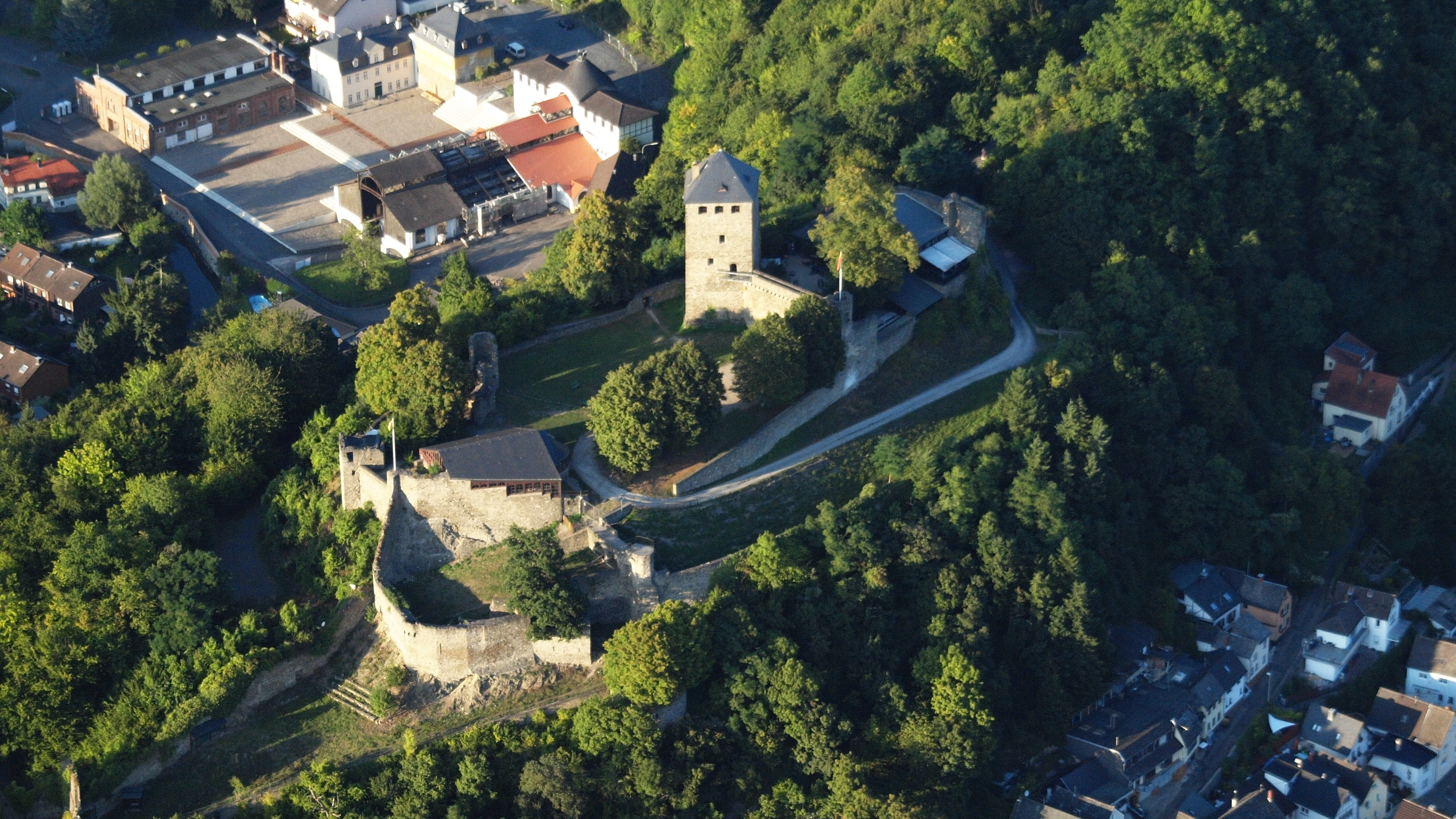
Ruins of the Sayn Castle

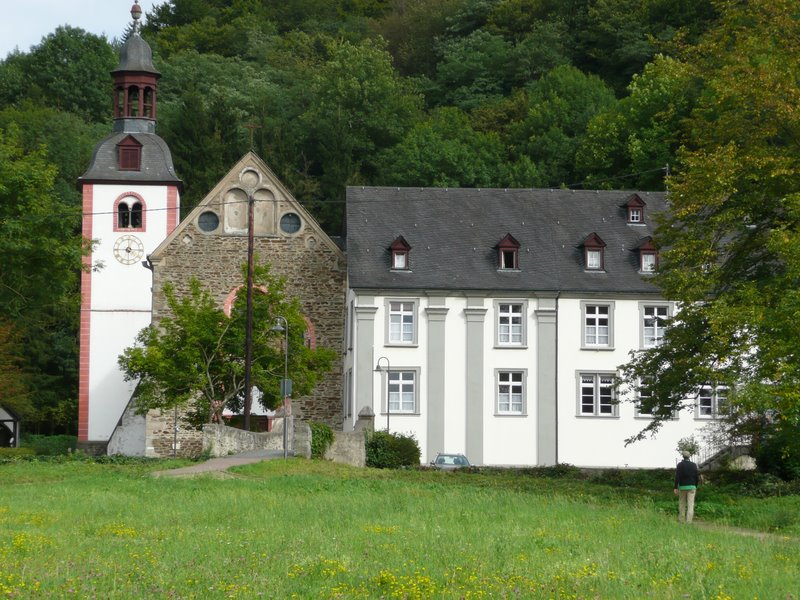
Former Premonstratensian Abbey of Sayn, Hauskloster und Grablege

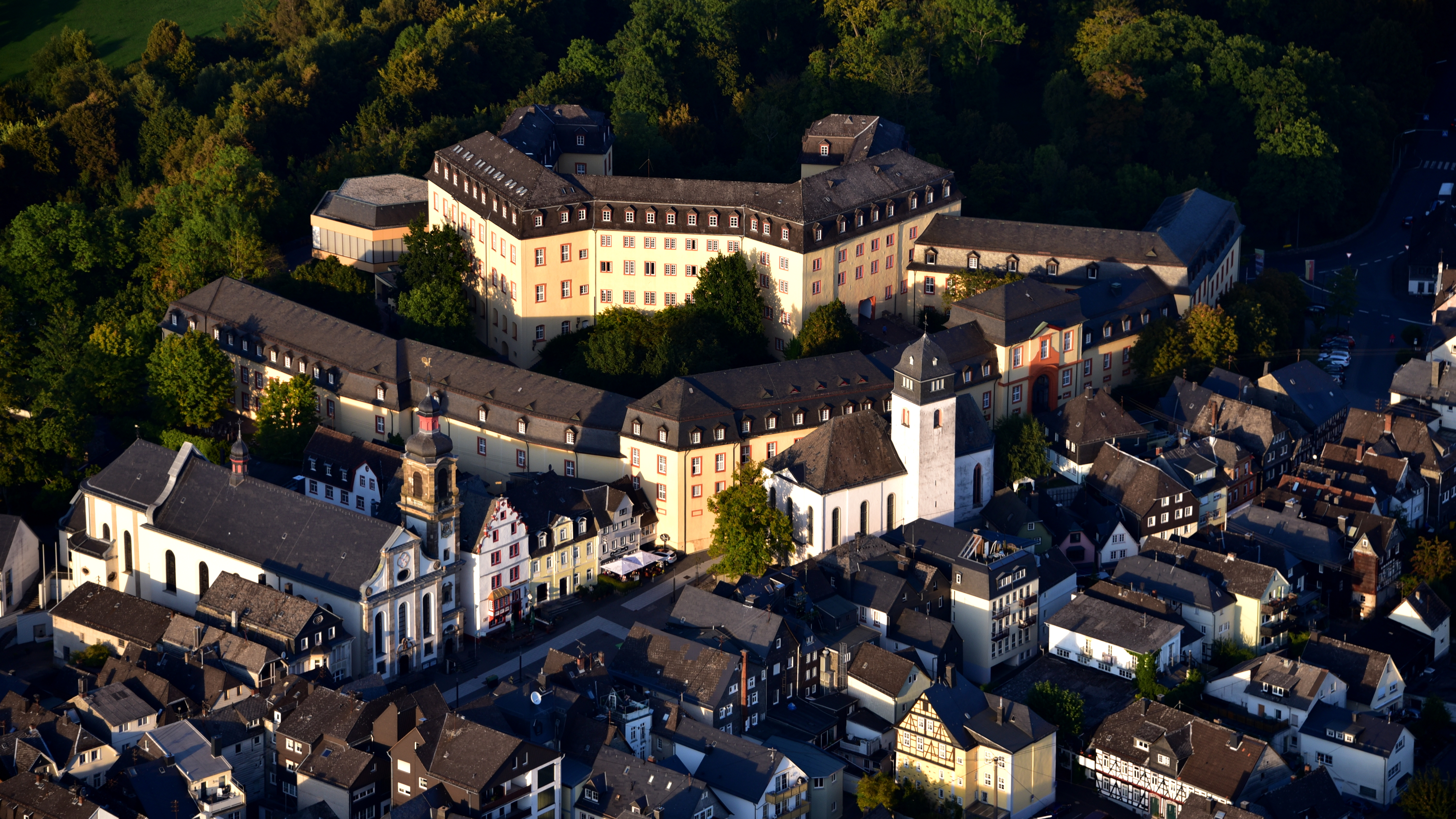
Hachenburg Castle

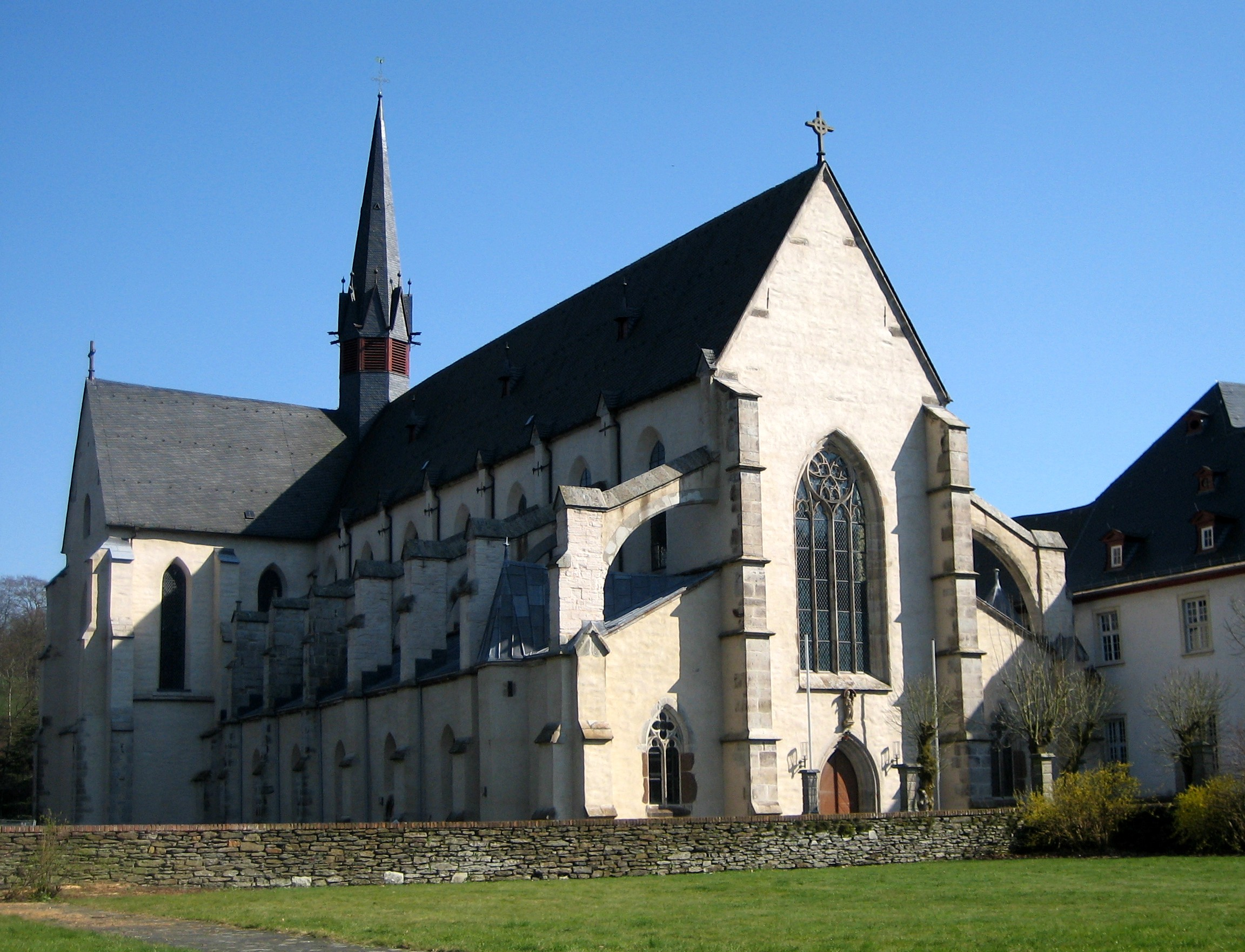
Marienstatt Abbey

== Rulers of Sayn ==
=== House of Sayn ===
Partitions of Sayn under Sayn rule

County of Sayn (1139-1701) (Homburg branch since 1608)	County of Homburg (1st creation) (1284-1384) renamed County of Wittgenstein (1st creation) (1384-1605)
County of Kirschgartshausen (1623-1719)	County of Homburg (2nd creation) (1631-1743)	County of Berleburg (1605-1806)
County of Wittgenstein (2nd creation) (1605-1647) renamed County of Hohnstein (1647-1806)	County of Vallendar (1657-1775)
County of Karlsburg (1694-1806)	County of Ludwigsburg (1694-1806)
Hachenburg annexed to Manderscheid family; Altenkirchen annexed to Saxony
County of Neumagen (1623-1806)
Mediatised to the Landgraviate of Hesse (from 1806)

Table of rulers

Monarch	Born	Reign	Ruling part	Consort	Death	Notes
First House of Sayn
Eberhard I	c.1110 First son of Emich II, Count of Dietz and Diemut of Laurenburg	1139 – 1176	County of Sayn	Kunigunde of Isenburg five children	1176 aged 65–66	
Henry I	c.1110 Second son of Emich II, Count of Dietz and Diemut of Laurenburg	1139 – 1159	County of Sayn	Unmarried	1159 aged 48–49	
Henry II	c.1140 First son of Eberhard I and Kunigunde of Isenburg	1176 – April 1203	County of Sayn	Agnes of Saffenberg (1173-27 May 1201) five children	April 1203 aged 62–63	
Eberhard I	c.1140 Second son of Eberhard I and Kunigunde of Isenburg	1176 – 1202	County of Sayn	Unmarried	1202 aged 61–62	
Henry III the Great	c.1185 Son of Henry II and Agnes of Saffenberg	April 1203 – 1 January 1247	County of Sayn	1215 one child	1 January 1247; Blankenberg aged 61–62	Died childless.
Matilda of Landsberg	1203; Daughter of Henry II and Agnes of Saffenberg	1 January – 29 August 1247 29 August 1247 – 1291	County of Sayn (in Löwenburg since 29 August 1247)	1215 one child	1291 aged 87–88	Wife and sister of Henry, they were his heiresses. Designated the first heiress by her husband, Matilda left her inheritance to her sister-in-law. The county of Sayn was therefore transmitted through female line. Matilda kept a seat at Löwenburg.
Adelaide	c.1190 Daughter of Henry II and Agnes of Saffenberg	29 August 1247 – 1263	County of Sayn	Godfrey III, Count of Sponheim; 1202 five children	1263 aged 72–73	Wife and sister of Henry, they were his heiresses. Designated the first heiress by her husband, Matilda left her inheritance to her sister-in-law. The county of Sayn was therefore transmitted through female line. Matilda kept a seat at Löwenburg.
House of Sayn-Sponheim or Second House of Sayn
John (I)	c.1205 Son of Godfrey III, Count of Sponheim and Adelaide	1263 – 1266	County of Sayn	? of Altena-Isenberg; 1202 five children	1263 aged 58–59	Also Count of Sponheim.
Godfrey I	c.1247 Son of John I and ? of Altena-Isenburg	1266 – 1284	County of Sayn	Judith of Isenburg-Cleeberg; August 1258 seven children	1284 aged 36–37	
John I	c.1260 First son of Godfrey I and Judith of Isenburg-Cleeberg	1284 – 23 November 1324	County of Sayn	Elisabeth of Hesse (1270-19 February 1293); 1287 five children Kunigunde of Neuerburg (d.1347); 1297 four children	23 November 1324 aged 63–64	Children of Godfrey, divided their inheritance.
Engelbert	c.1260 Second son of Godfrey I and Judith of Isenburg-Cleeberg	1284 – 1336	County of Homburg	Judith of Lower Isenburg (d.1313); 24 February 1286 one child Metza (d.1330); 1313 no children Clarissa (d.1335); 1330 no children	23 November 1324 aged 63–64	Children of Godfrey, divided their inheritance.
Godfrey II	c.1290 Son of John I and Elisabeth of Hesse	23 November 1324 – 1327	County of Sayn	Matilda of the Mark (d.1327) no children	1327 aged 36–37	Children of John I, ruled jointly.
John II	c.1300 Son of John I and Kunigunde of Neuerburg	1327 – 25 December 1360	County of Sayn	Elisabeth of Jülich (1315-1389); 29 September 1330 five children	25 December 1360 aged 59–60	Children of John I, ruled jointly.
Godfrey III	c.1290 Son of Engelbert and Judith of Lower Isenburg	1336 – 1354	County of Homburg	Sophia of Folmestein (d.1323); 24 November 1311 seven children Maria von Dollendorf (d.1364) c.1325 three children	1354 aged 63–64	
Salentin	1314; Homburg; Son of Godfrey III and Sophia of Folmestein	1354 – 1392	County of Homburg (until 1384) County of Wittgenstein (from 1384)	Adelaide of Wittgenstein c.1350 two children Elisabeth von Hirschhorn (d.1380); 23 June 1362 two children	1354 aged 63–64	In 1384 he merged the counties of Wittgenstein (inherited through his wife) and his own. The seat changed to Wittgenstein.
John III	c.1330 Son of John II and Elisabeth of Jülich	25 December 1360 – 25 February 1409	County of Sayn	Adelaide of Westerburg; 24 June 1349 seven children	25 February 1409 aged 78–79	
John IV	1385; Son of Salentin and Adelaide of Wittgenstein	1392 – 1436	County of Wittgenstein	Catherine of Solms; July 1386 seven children	1436 aged 50–51	
Gerhard I	c.1360 Son of John III and Adelaide of Westerburg	25 February 1409 – 15 September 1419	County of Sayn	Sophia of Stein-Löwenberg (d.1395); 1385 one child Anna of Solms-Braunfels; June 1409 two children	15 September 1419 aged 58–59	
Regency of Anna of Solms-Braunfels (1419-1429)						Left no children. The county was inherited by his brother.
Dietrich	7 August 1415; First son of Gerhard I and Anna of Solms-Braunfels	15 September 1419 – 2 August 1452	County of Sayn	Margaret of Nassau-Dillenburg; 1435 no children	2 August 1452 aged 36–37	Left no children. The county was inherited by his brother.
George	1420; Son of John IV and Catherine of Solms	1436 – 7 May 1472	County of Wittgenstein	Elisabeth of the Mark (1400-1474); 1 March 1436 eight children	7 May 1472 aged 51–52	
Gerhard II	1417; Second son of Gerhard I and Anna of Solms-Braunfels	2 August 1452 – January 1493	County of Sayn	Elisabeth of Zirk (6 March 1435 - 20 July 1489); 1453 sixteen children	January 1493 aged 75–76	
Eberhard	1440; Son of George and Elisabeth of the Mark	7 May 1472 – 1494	County of Wittgenstein	Margaret of Rodemachern (1450-22 June 1509) c.1470 seven children	1494; Wittgenstein Castle aged 53–54	
Gerhard III	9 February 1454; First son of Gerhard II and Elisabeth of Zirk	January 1493 – 26 January 1506	County of Sayn	Johanna of Wied (1480-1529); 1493 six children	26 January 1506 aged 51	Children of Gerhard II, ruled jointly.
Sebastian I	20 January 1464; Fifth son of Gerhard II and Elisabeth of Zirk	January 1493 – 12 November 1498	County of Sayn	Maria of Limburg-Breuch (1465-7 June 1525); 1482 four children	12 November 1498 aged 34	Children of Gerhard II, ruled jointly.
William the Elder	24 August 1488; Homburg Castle; First son of Eberhard and Margaret of Rodemachern	1494 – 18 April 1570	County of Wittgenstein (Southern part)	Johannetta, Countess of Isenburg-Neumagen (1500-8 August 1563); 1522 seven children	18 April 1570; Wittgenstein Castle aged 81–82	Children of George, divided the rule. John didn't have surviving children, and the county eventually reunited.
John V	1489; Wittgenstein Castle; Second son of Eberhard and Margaret of Rodemachern	1494 – 2 April 1551	County of Wittgenstein (Northern part)	Agnes von Eza no children Margaret of Henneberg; 1534 three children	2 April 1551; Berleburg Castle aged 61–62	Children of George, divided the rule. John didn't have surviving children, and the county eventually reunited.
John VI	1491; Son of Sebastian I and Maria of Limburg-Breuch	26 January 1506 – 1529	County of Sayn (at Sayn proper)	Agnes von Heekeren no children Ottilie of Nassau-Saarbrücken (26 December 1492 - 1 March 1554); 1 January 1516 three children	1529 aged 37–38	
John VII	1518; First son of John VI and Ottilie of Nassau-Saarbrücken	1529 – 20 March 1560	County of Sayn (half 1)	Elisabeth of Holstein-Schauenburg (1520-19 January 1545); 1538 five children Anna of Hohenlohe-Waldenburg; 1549 one child	15 September 1419 aged 58–59	Children of John VI, divided their inheritance.
Sebastian II	c.1360 Second son of John VI and Ottilie of Nassau-Saarbrücken	1529 – 1 January 1573	County of Sayn (half 2)	Unmarried	1 January 1573 aged 58–59	Children of John VI, divided their inheritance.
Louis I the Elder	7 December 1532; Wittgenstein Castle; Son of William and Johannetta, Countess of Isenburg-Neumagen	18 April 1570 – 2 July 1605	County of Wittgenstein	Anna of Solms-Braunfels; 14 August 1559; Dillenburg Castle three children Elisabeth of Solms-Laubach; 13 January 1556; Laubach seventeen children	2 July 1605; Altenkirchen aged 72	
Adolf	1538; First son of John VII and Elisabeth of Holstein-Schauenburg	1 January 1573 – 15 September 1419	County of Sayn (in Sayn half 1 until 1573)	Maria of Mansfeld-Eisleben; 1 September 1560; Eisleben one child	15 September 1419 aged 58–59	Children of John VII, shared their inheritance, and added their uncle's part in 1573.
Henry IV	1539; Second son of John VII and Elisabeth of Holstein-Schauenburg	1 January 1573 – 17 January 1606	County of Sayn (in Sayn half 1 until 1573)	Jutta von Mallinckrodt; February 1574 no children	17 January 1606; Sayn Castle aged 58–59	Children of John VII, shared their inheritance, and added their uncle's part in 1573.
Herman	1543; Third son of John VII and Elisabeth of Holstein-Schauenburg	1 January 1573 – 17 March 1588	County of Sayn (in Sayn half 1 until 1573)	Elisabeth of Erbach; 8 September 1571 one child	17 March 1588 aged 44–45	Children of John VII, shared their inheritance, and added their uncle's part in 1573.
Anna Elisabeth	1 February 1572; Daughter of Herman and Elisabeth of Erbach	17 January 1606 – 11 March 1608	County of Sayn	William II; 1 June 1591 two children	11 March 1608; Hachenburg aged 36	Heiress of her uncle.
George II	30 April 1565; Wittgenstein Castle; Son of Louis I and Anna of Solms-Braunfels	17 January 1606 – 16 December 1631	County of Berleburg	Elisabeth of Nassau-Weilburg; 12 June 1596 eight children Maria Anna Juliana of Nassau-Dillenburg; 7 November 1608 seven children	16 December 1631 aged 66	Children of Louis I, divided their inheritance.
William II	14 March 1569; Wittgenstein Castle; First son of Louis I and Elisabeth of Solms-Laubach	17 January 1606 – 29 October 1623	County of Sayn (jure uxoris)	Anna Elisabeth; 1 June 1591 two children Anna Ottilia of Nassau-Weilburg; 18 November 1609; Weilburg seven children	29 October 1623 aged 54	Children of Louis I, divided their inheritance.
Louis II the Younger	15 March 1571; Wittgenstein Castle; Second son of Louis I and Elisabeth of Solms-Laubach	2 July 1605 – 14 December 1634	County of Wittgenstein	Elisabeth Juliana of Solms-Braunfels; 17 October 1598; Berleburg fourteen children	14 December 1634; Frankfurt am Main aged 72	Children of Louis I, divided their inheritance.
Ernest	26 August 1594; Son of William II and Anna Elisabeth	29 October 1623 – 22 May 1632	County of Sayn	Louise Juliane of Erbach; 19 January 1624 six children	22 May 1632; Frankfurt am Main aged 37	Children of William II, divided their inheritance.
Regency of Anna Ottilia of Nassau-Weilburg (1623-1635)						Children of William II, divided their inheritance.
Louis Albert	8 September 1617; Second son of William II and Anna Ottilia of Nassau-Weilburg	29 October 1623 – 22 October 1664	County of Neumagen	Johannetta Maria of Wied (7 August 1615 – 1715); 1650 three children	22 October 1664 aged 47	Children of William II, divided their inheritance.
Christian	11 September 1621; Third son of William II and Anna Ottilia of Nassau-Weilburg	29 October 1623 – 29 October 1675	County of Kirschgarthausen	[Anna Amalia of Nassau-Dillenburg; 25 December 1646; Dillenburg no children Philippine of Isenburg-Offenbach; 25 February 1651; Offenbach am Main six children	29 October 1675; Vienna aged 54	Children of William II, divided their inheritance.
Louis Casimir	30 April 1598; Bad Berleburg; Second son of George II and Elisabeth of Nassau-Weilburg	16 December 1631 – 6 June 1643	County of Berleburg	Elisabeth Juliana of Nassau-Weilburg (27 March 1598 - 18 April 1682); 26 August 1627; Burg Schwalbach am Taunus two children	6 June 1643; Wetter aged 45	Children of George II, divided their inheritance.
George III	25 January 1605; Fifth son of George II and Elisabeth of Nassau-Weilburg	16 December 1631 – 10 December 1680	County of Berleburg	Elisabeth Juliana of Nassau-Weilburg (27 March 1598 - 18 April 1682); 27 August 1647 no children	10 December 1680 aged 75	Children of George II, divided their inheritance.
Ernest	8 April 1599; Bad Berleburg; Third son of Louis I and Anna of Solms-Braunfels	16 December 1631 – 20 March 1649	County of Homburg	Elisabeth of Sayn-Wittgenstein; 1635 five children Christine of Waldeck-Wildungen; 11 September 1642 three children	20 March 1649; Homburg Castle aged 66	Children of George II, divided their inheritance.
Regency of Louise Juliane of Erbach (1632-1636)						Louis died as a minor, and his mother prolonged the regency to his sisters.
Louis III	1628; Son of Ernest and Louise Juliane of Erbach	22 May 1632 – 16 July 1636	County of Sayn	Unmarried	16 July 1636 aged 7–8	Louis died as a minor, and his mother prolonged the regency to his sisters.
John VIII	14 October 1601; Wittgenstein Castle; Son of Louis II and Elisabeth Juliana of Solms-Braunfels	14 December 1634 – 2 April 1657	County of Wittgenstein (until 1647) County of Hohenstein (from 1647)	Anna Augusta of Waldeck-Wildungen; 30 June 1627; Wittgenstein Castle fifteen children	2 April 1657 aged 56	
Regency of Louise Juliane of Erbach (1636-1652)						Louis Juliane had a harder regency this second time, as she faced her in-laws for possession of the main county of Sayn. However, she was skillful enough to keep it to her daughters, sisters of Louis III. Ernestine and Johannetta divided the county, and each part was inherited by their respective descendants.
Ernestine Salentine	23 April 1626; Hachenburg; First daughter ofErnest and Louise Juliane of Erbach	16 July 1636 – 13 October 1661	County of Sayn (at Hachenburg)	Salentin Ernest, Count of Mandersheid-Blankenheim; 21 October 1651 seven children	13 October 1661 aged 35	Louis Juliane had a harder regency this second time, as she faced her in-laws for possession of the main county of Sayn. However, she was skillful enough to keep it to her daughters, sisters of Louis III. Ernestine and Johannetta divided the county, and each part was inherited by their respective descendants.
Johannetta	27 August 1632; Wittgenstein Castle; Second daughter ofErnest and Louise Juliane of Erbach	16 July 1636 – 28 September 1701	County of Sayn (at Altenkirchen)	John of Hesse-Braubach; 30 September 1647 no children John George I, Duke of Saxe-Eisenach; 29 May 1661; Wallau eight children	28 September 1701; Jena aged 69	Louis Juliane had a harder regency this second time, as she faced her in-laws for possession of the main county of Sayn. However, she was skillful enough to keep it to her daughters, sisters of Louis III. Ernestine and Johannetta divided the county, and each part was inherited by their respective descendants.
Hachenburg inherited by Manderscheid family; Altenkirchen inherited by the House of Wettin; For their successors see, respectively Sayn-Wittgenstein-Hachenburg and Sayn-Wittgenstein-Sayn-Altenkirchen
Regency of Christine of Waldeck-Wildungen(1649-1658)						
William Frederick	16 August 1640; Son of Ernest and Elisabeth of Sayn-Wittgenstein	20 March 1649 – 25 October 1698	County of Homburg	Anna Maria Magdalena of Sayn-Wittgenstein; 8 September 1673 four children	25 October 1698 aged 58	
Louis Christian	17 January 1629; Wittgenstein Castle; First son of John VIII and Anna Augusta of Waldeck-Wildungen	2 April 1657 – 25 January 1683	County of Hohenstein	Elisabeth Margaret of Solms-Braunfels; 27 May 1656; Greifenstein no children Anna Elisabeth Wieg; 1682 no children	25 January 1683; Wittgenstein Castle aged 54	Children of John VIII, divided their inheritance.
Gustav Otto	14 April 1633; Frankfurt am Main; Fourth son of John VIII and Anna Augusta of Waldeck-Wildungen	2 April 1657 – 15 October 1701	County of Hohenstein	Anne Hélène de La Place (1634 - 24 February 1705); 12 August 1657 thirteen children	15 October 1701; Marburg aged 68	Children of John VIII, divided their inheritance.
Frederick William	20 November 1647; Wittgenstein Castle; Seventh son of John VIII and Anna Augusta of Waldeck-Wildungen	2 April 1657 – 10 November 1685	County of Vallendar	Charlotte Louise of Leiningen-Hardenburg; 1671 eight children	10 November 1685; Vallendar aged 37	Children of John VIII, divided their inheritance.
Regency of Johannetta Maria of Wied (1664-1676)						
Charles Louis Albert	20 July 1658; Son of Louis Albert and Johannetta Maria of Wied	22 October 1664 – 16 September 1724	County of Neumagen	Concordia of Sayn-Hohenstein; 20 June 1681 two children Charlotte of Sayn-Hohnstein; 20 June 1689 two children	16 September 1724 aged 66	
Charles Louis	1655; Son of Christian and Philippine of Isenburg-Offenbach	29 October 1675 – 21 October 1699	County of Kirschgarthausen	Anna Metta von Brockdorff (d.6 January 1718); 1683 one child	21 October 1699 aged 43–44	
George William	28 September 1636; Bad Berleburg; Son of Louis Casimir and Elisabeth of Nassau-Weilburg	10 December 1680 – 25 May 1684	County of Berleburg	Amélie Marguerite de la Place (1635 - 16 February 1669); 28 September 1657; Düsseldorf seven children Sophia Elisabeth of Wied; 13 November 1669 three children Charlotte Amalie of Isenburg-Offenbach; 24 June 1674; Offenbach am Main four children	25 May 1684; Bad Berleburg aged 47	
Louis Francis I	17 April 1660; Bad Berleburg; Son of Louis Casimir and Amélie Marguerite de la Place	25 May 1684 – 25 November 1694	County of Berleburg	Hedwig Sophie of Lippe-Brake; 27 October 1685; Lemgo six children	25 November 1694; Bad Berleburg aged 34	
Regency of Charlotte Louise of Leiningen-Hardenburg (1685-1694)						
John Frederick	1676; Son of Frederick William and Charlotte Louise of Leiningen-Hardenburg	10 November 1685 – 27 April 1718	County of Vallendar	Maria Anna von Wieser (4 February 1675 - 8 October 1759); 1699 at least two children	27 April 1718; Vallendar aged 41–42	
Regency of Hedwig Sophie of Lippe-Brake (1694-1712) and Rudolph, Count of Lippe-Brake (1694-1707)						
Casimir	31 January 1687; Bad Berleburg; First son of Louis Francis I and Hedwig Sophie of Lippe-Brake	25 November 1694 – 5 June 1741	County of Berleburg	Maria Charlotte of Isenburg-Wächtersbach; 18 December 1711; Wächtersbach three children Esther Maria Polyxena of Wurmbrand-Stupach (17 December 1696 - 14 March 1755); 6 May 1717; Saalburg-Ebersdorf five children	5 June 1741; Bad Berleburg aged 54	
Charles William	4 April 1693; Bad Berleburg; Second son of Louis Francis I and Hedwig Sophie of Lippe-Brake	25 November 1694 – 18 January 1749	County of Karlsburg	Johanna Louise of Bentheim-Tecklenburg (8 June 1696 - 1 November 1735); 28 December 1727 two children Charlotte Louise Henkel von Donnersmark (3 April 1709 - 25 March 1784); 21 November 1737; Pölzig six children	18 January 1749; Rheda aged 55	
Louis Francis II	31 January 1687; Bad Berleburg; Third son of Louis Francis I and Hedwig Sophie of Lippe-Brake	25 November 1694 – 24 February 1750	County of Ludwigsburg	Helena Emilia of Solms-Baruth; 17 March 1722; Baruth ten children	24 February 1750; Bad Berleburg aged 54	
Charles Frederick	1674; Son of William Frederick and Anna Maria Magdalena of Sayn-Wittgenstein	25 October 1698 – 27 March 1723	County of Homburg	Maria Wilhelmina Elisabeth von Schönburg-Mertola (1700-1762); 1723 four children Diane Françoise Marie de Cholette; 1706 no children	20 March 1649; Homburg Castle aged 66	
Philip William	5 September 1688; Son of Charles Louis and Anna Metta von Brockdorff	21 October 1699 – 6 May 1719	County of Kirschgarthausen	Anna Sophia of Isenburg-Birstein; 9 November/December 1712; Birstein four children	6 May 1719; Kirschgarthausen aged 30	Left no male descendants. His county merged in Neumagen.
Kirschgarthausen annexed to Neumagen
Henry Albert	6 December 1658; The Hague; First son of Gustav Otto and Anne Hélène de La Place	15 October 1701 – 23 November 1723	County of Hohenstein	Sophia Juliana of Lippe-Biesterfeld (6 December 1676 - 2 June 1705); 23 October 1694 no children Sophia Elisabeth of Sayn-Homburg (20 August 1675 - 27 August 1712); 8 December 1705 no children Sophia Florentina of Sayn-Berleburg (4 April 1688 - 16 June 1745); 19 November 1712 no children	23 November 1723; Wittgenstein Castle aged 64	Left no descendants. The county passed to his brother.
Francis Frederick Hugo	1701; First son of John Frederick and Maria Anna von Wieser	27 April 1718 – 1769	County of Vallendar	Anna Maria of Leiningen-Neuleiningen (20 October 1741 – 1830) c.1750? at least one child	1769; Vallendar aged 67–68	Children of John Frederick, ruled jointly. However, as they left no descendants, Vallendar was reabsorbed in Hohenstein after their deaths.
John William	c.1705 Second son of John Frederick and Maria Anna von Wieser	27 April 1718 – 1775	County of Vallendar	Unmarried	1775; Vallendar aged 69–70	Children of John Frederick, ruled jointly. However, as they left no descendants, Vallendar was reabsorbed in Hohenstein after their deaths.
Vallendar re-merged in Hohenstein
Frederick Charles	6 March 1716; Son of Charles Frederick and Maria Wilhelmina Elisabeth von Schönburg-Mertola	27 March 1723 – 15 October 1743	County of Homburg	Saloma Johanna von Dist (1723-1761); 1741 no children	15 October 1743 aged 27	Left no descendants. The county re-merged in Berleburg.
Homburg re-merged in Berleburg
August David	14 April 1663; Klettenberg; Third son of Gustav Otto and Anne Hélène de La Place	23 November 1723 – 27 August 1745	County of Hohenstein	Concordia Friederike of Sayn-Vallendar (1679 - 6 June 1709); 1703; Weilburg two children Albertina Amalia of Leiningen-Schaumburg (12 October 1686 - 26 March 1723); 3 January 1715 four children	27 August 1745; Wittgenstein Castle aged 82	Co-ruling with his brother since 1719.
Louis Alexander	26 December 1694; Third son of Charles Louis Albert and Charlotte of Sayn-Hohnstein	16 September 1724 – 22 May 1768	County of Neumagen	Friederika Wilhelmina von Wendesen (25 October 1700-1780); 1 January 1724 eight children	22 May 1768 aged 73	Married morganatically, and his children could not succeed in the county, which passed to his brother.
Louis Ferdinand	1 January 1712; Bad Berleburg; Son of Casimir and Maria Charlotte of Isenburg-Wächtersbach	5 June 1741 – 12 February 1773	County of Berleburg	Friederike Christine of Isenburg-Philippseich (22 July 1721 - 16 August 1772); 26 July 1744; Dreieich four children	12 February 1773; Bad Berleburg aged 61	
Frederick	19 January 1708; Berlin; Son of August David and Concordia Friederike of Sayn-Vallendar	27 August 1745 – 9 June 1756	County of Hohenstein	Auguste Amalie Albertine of Nassau-Siegen (5 September 1712 - 22 February 1742); 6 May 1738; Siegen two children Elisabeth Hedwig of Nassau-Siegen (19 April 1719; † 10 January 1789); 12 June 1743; Siegen no children	9 June 1756; Wittgenstein Castle aged 82	
Adolph William Louis	30 June 1740; Son of Charles William and Charlotte Louise Henkel von Donnersmark	18 January 1749 – 12 July 1806	County of Karlsburg	Sarah Tamminga du Tour (10 August 1751 - 16 February 1811); 27 September 1778 no children	13 November 1814 aged 74	In 1806, the county was mediatized to Hesse.
Karlsburg was annexed to the Electorate of Hesse
Christian Louis Casimir	13 July 1725; Bad Berleburg; Son of Louis Francis II and Helena Emilia of Solms-Baruth	24 February 1750 – 6 May 1797	County of Ludwigsburg	Amalie Ludowika Finck von Finckenstein (3 February 1740 - 15 December 1771); 13 July 1763 no children Anna Petrovna Dolgorukova (1742 - 8 July 1789); 14 February 1774 seven children	6 May 1797; Rheda aged 71	
John Louis	3 August 1740; Wittgenstein Castle; Son of Frederick and Auguste Amalie Albertine of Nassau-Siegen	9 June 1756 – 27 March 1796	County of Hohenstein	Friederika Carolina Louise von Pückler-Limpurg (9 June 1738 - 27 July 1772); 21 March 1761; Burgfarnbach eight children Wilhelmina Henrietta Carolina von Pückler-Limpurg (30 August 1746 - 20 March 1800); 9 November 1772; Burgfarnbach four children	27 March 1796; Wittgenstein Castle aged 55	
Frederick Charles	15 March 1703; Fourth son of Charles Louis Albert and Charlotte of Sayn-Hohnstein	22 May 1768 – 19 June 1786	County of Neumagen	Sophia Ferdinanda of Sayn-Karlsburg (21 August 1741 - 22 June 1774); 18 March 1765 five children	19 June 1786 aged 83	
Christian Henry	12 September 1753; Bad Berleburg; Son of Louis Ferdinand and Friederike Christine of Isenburg-Philippseich	12 February 1773 – 4 October 1800	County of Berleburg (until 1792) Principality of Berleburg(from 1792)	Charlotte Friederike Franziska of Leiningen-Altleiningen (19 August 1759 - 22 January 1831); 17 April 1775; Grünstadt twelve children	4 October 1800; Röspe aged 47	
Regency of Sophia Ferdinanda of Sayn-Karlsburg (1786-1790)						In 1806, the county was mediatized to Hesse.
Frederick Charles Louis Adolf	20 November 1772; Second son of Frederick Charles and Sophia Ferdinanda of Sayn-Karlsburg	19 June 1786 – 12 July 1806	County of Neumagen	Johanna Philippina Marburg (27 May 1782 – 6 November 1815) c.1810 one child	10 October 1827 aged 47	In 1806, the county was mediatized to Hesse.
Neumagen was annexed to the Electorate of Hesse
Frederick Charles	23 February 1766; Wittgenstein Castle; Son of John Louis and Friederika Carolina Louise von Pückler-Limpurg	27 March 1796 – 12 July 1806	County of Hohenstein (until 1801) Principality of Hohenstein (from 1801)	Friederika Albertina of Schwarzburg-Sondershausen (15 July 1773 - 25 July 1806); 31 May 1796; Coswig five children Louisa Langenbach (23 November 1790 - 18 June 1864); 4 April 1807 (morganatic) four children	8 April 1837; Wittgenstein Castle aged 71	In 1806, the principality was mediatized to Hesse.
Hohenstein was annexed to the Electorate of Hesse
Louis Adolph Peter	17 January 1769; Pereiaslav; Son of Christian Louis Casimir and Amalie Ludowika Finck von Finckenstein	6 May 1797 – 12 July 1806	County of Ludwigsburg	Antonia Cäcilie Snarska (1779-1855); 27 June 1798 eleven children	11 June 1843; Lviv aged 74	In 1806, the county was mediatized to Hesse.
Berleburg was annexed to the Electorate of Hesse
Albert	12 May 1777; Bad Berleburg; Son of Christian Henry and Charlotte Friederike Franziska of Leiningen-Altleiningen	4 October 1800 – 12 July 1806	Principality of Berleburg	Christiana Charlotte Wilhelmina of Ortenburg; 18 August 1830; Ortenburg four children	11 November 1851; Bad Berleburg aged 74	In 1806, the county was mediatized to Hesse.
Berleburg was annexed to the Electorate of Hesse

== See also ==
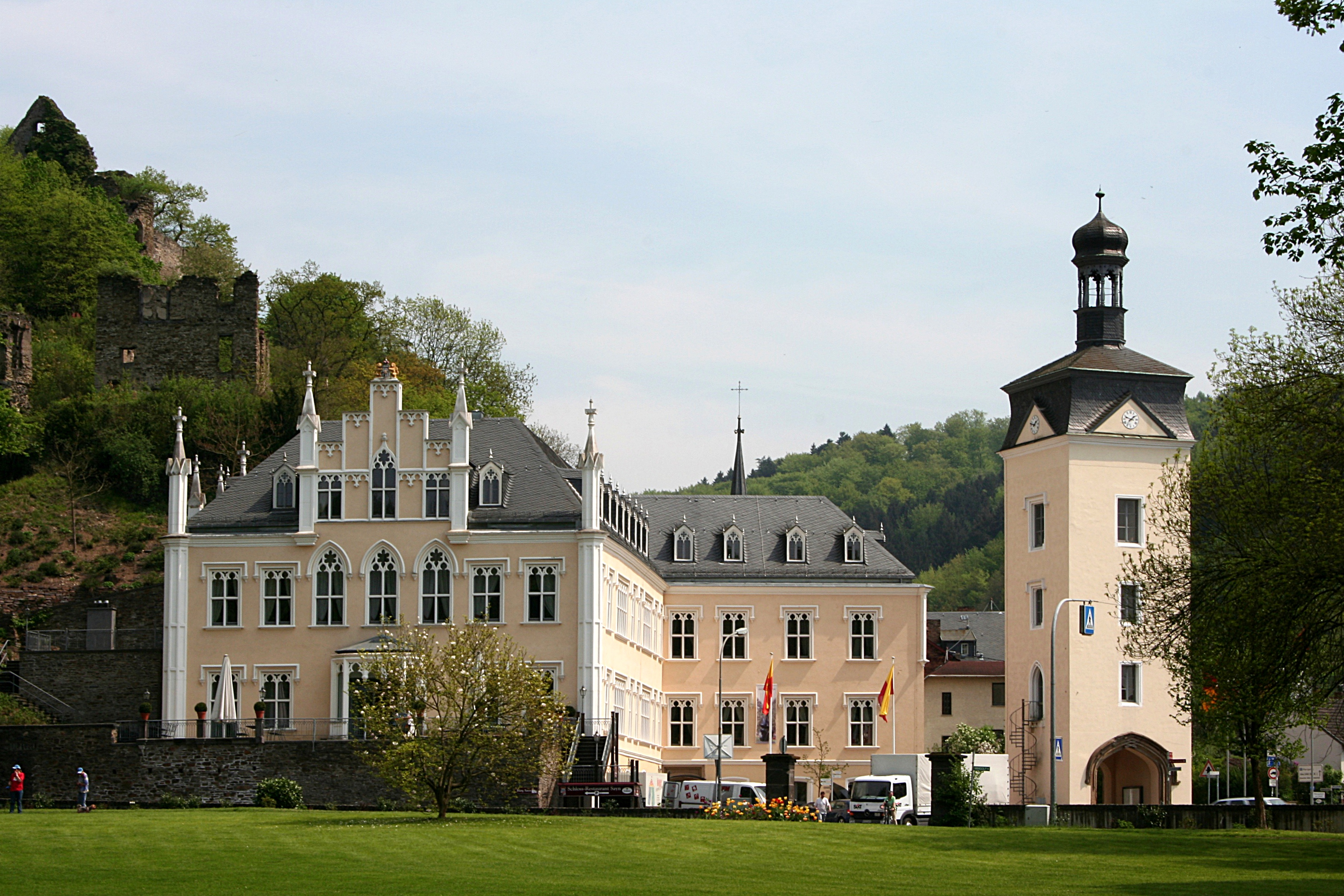
The old and the new castle at Sayn

- Sayn-Homburg
- Sayn-Wittgenstein
- Sayn-Wittgenstein-Berleburg
- Sayn-Wittgenstein-Hachenburg
- Sayn-Wittgenstein-Hohenstein
- Sayn-Wittgenstein-Karlsburg
- Sayn-Wittgenstein-Ludwigsburg
- Sayn-Wittgenstein-Sayn
- Sayn-Wittgenstein-Sayn-Altenkirchen
- Sayn-Wittgenstein-Vallendar
- Sponheim-Sayn
