= Louise Juliane of Erbach =

- Born: 1603; Fürstenau Castle near Michelstadt
- Died: 28 September 1670 (age 67-68); Friedewald
- Buried: Castle church in Hachenburg
- Noble family: House of Erbach
- Spouse: Ernest of Sayn-Wittgenstein-Sayn
- Father: George III, Count of Erbach-Breuberg
- Mother: Maria of Barby-Mühlingen

Countess Louise Juliane of Erbach (1603 at Fürstenau Castle near Michelstadt – 28 September 1670 in Friedewald) was a German noble and regent. She was Countess of Sayn-Wittgenstein-Sayn by marriage to Ernest of Sayn-Wittgenstein-Sayn.

She acted as regent of Sayn-Wittgenstein-Sayn between 1632 and 1652; initially during the absence of her spouse, in 1632-1636 during the minority of her son, and in 1636-1652 as interim regent during the interregnum following the death of her son and the ensuing succession dispute.

She is remembered as the title character of the novel Die Gräfin von Sayn ("The Countess of Sayn") by Karl Ramseger-Mühle.

== Biography ==
Countess Louise Juliane of Erbach was born in 1603 as the daughter of Count George III and his wife, Maria of Barby-Mühlingen. She married Count Ernest of Sayn-Wittgenstein-Sayn in January 1624, shortly after he had inherited the County. He was the son of Count William III of Sayn-Wittgenstein-Sayn, who had reunited the two lines of Sayn by marrying Anna Elisabeth of Sayn. William III had three more sons from his second marriage to Anna-Ottilie of Nassau-Weilburg, who would dispute the inheritance after Juliane's son Louis died in 1636.

The young couple chose the castle in Hachenburg as their residence. They had six children; however, three of their five daughters died at a young age.

=== Regency ===
During the Thirty Years' War, Ernest served in the army and Louise Juliane led the county's government. In 1632, they travelled to Frankfurt, to ask King Gustavus Adolphus of Sweden to help their beleaguered country. However, Ernest died there, aged 32. In his will, he left the county to his son Louis and made Louise Juliane his guardian and regent while he was still underage. In case he would die prematurely, the two remaining daughters would inherit the county.

Louise Juliane took up the regency and held that this prevented her from remarrying. She administered the county skillfully. In 1636, her son Louis died, almost seven years old. With his death, the male line of Sayn-Wittgenstein-Sayn died out. Louis Albert, one of her late husband's half-brothers, forced her to transfer the county to him and his two brothers, disregarding Ernest's will. Two months later, Louise Juliane rescinded her consent to this transfer. Count Christian, Louis Albert's youngest brother then besieged Altenkirchen and the Electorate of Mainz besieged Hachenburg. Hachenburg had to surrender when the food ran out, and Louise Juliane and her daughters fled to Freusburg. When the Electorate of Trier prepared to besiege Freusburg, she fled to Friedewald, where she found safety. Louise Juliane sued her in-laws before the Reichskammergericht and before the Emperor. She sent her councillors to Münster and Osnabrück where the Peace of Westphalia of 1648 was being negotiated. The rights of her daughters were recognized and, with Swedish assistance, one part of the county after the other was returned to her.

=== Later life ===
In 1652, she handed over the County of Sayn to her daughters, who divided it into Sayn-Wittgenstein-Altenkirchen and Sayn-Wittgenstein-Hachenburg. Sayn-Wittgenstein-Hachenburg was given to Ernestine, who was married to Count Salentin Ernest of Manderscheid-Blankenheim. It was held by the Counts of Manderscheid for several generations, then inherited by the Burgraves of Kirchberg and in 1799 by Nassau-Weilburg. Sayn-Altenkirchen was given to Johannetta. Via her second husband, John George I, Duke of Saxe-Eisenach, it went to the younger line of Saxe-Eisenach. After that line died out in 1741, Sayn-Altenkirchen fell to Brandenburg-Ansbach. In 1791, it was given to Prussia and in 1802 to Nassau-Usingen.

Louise Juliane died on 16 September 1670 in Friedewald. She was buried beside her husband and her son in the crypt of the castle church in Hachenburg.

== Marriage and issue ==
From her marriage to Ernest, Count of Sayn-Wittgenstein-Sayn (26 August 1594 – 22 May 1632), she had six children:

- Ernestine Salentine (23 April 1626 – 13 October 1661), married Count Salentin Ernest of Manderscheid-Blankenheim (1630 – 1705).
- Charlotte (1627 – 1629).
- Louis, Count of Sayn-Wittgenstein-Sayn (8 September 1628 – 16 July 1636).
- Louise (born and died 10 August 1629).
- Maria Elisabeth (24 December 1630 – 7 December 1631).
- Johannette (27 August 1632 – 28 September 1701), married firstly in 1647 to Landgrave John of Hesse-Braubach (1609 – 1651) and secondly in 1661 to Duke John George I, Duke of Saxe-Eisenach (1634 – 1686). Her daughter by her second husband, Princess Eleonore Erdmuthe of Saxe-Eisenach, was the mother of the Queen consort Caroline of Ansbach.
