= Lower Rhenish–Westphalian Circle =

Imperial circle of the Holy Roman Empire

The Lower Rhenish–Westphalian Circle during the mid 16th century (after the Burgundian treaty of 1548)

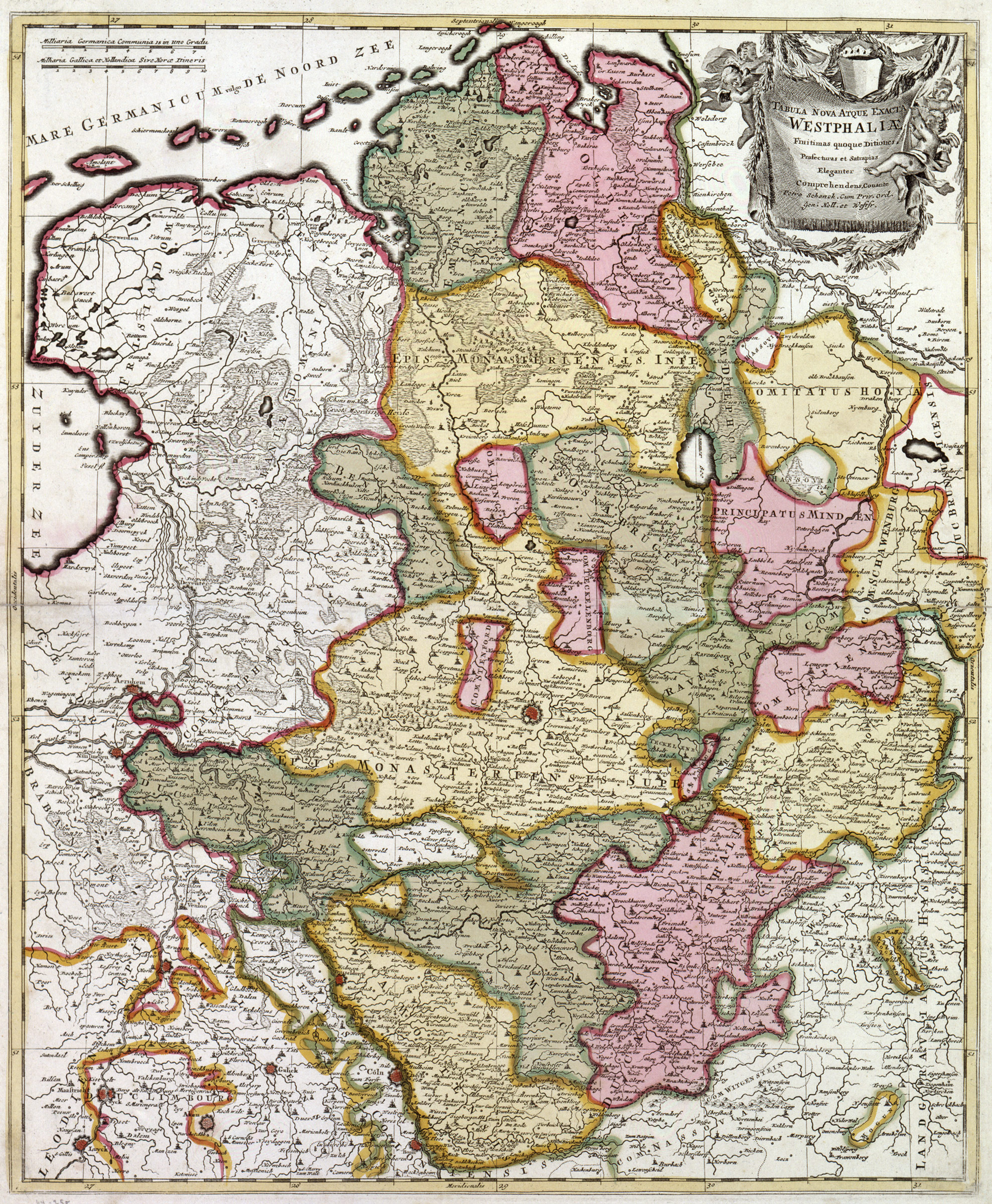
Historical map of the Lower Rhenish–Westphalian Circle of 1710 by Peter Schenk the Elder

The Lower Rhenish–Westphalian Circle (German: Niederrheinisch-Westfälischer Reichskreis, Dutch: Nederrijns-Westfaalse Kreits) was an imperial circle of the Holy Roman Empire. It comprised territories of the former Duchy of Lower Lotharingia, Frisia and the Westphalian part of the former Duchy of Saxony. The circle was made up of numerous small states, however the Counts De la Marck were able to collect a significant number of territories, the United Duchies of Jülich-Cleves-Berg, from 1521 on. The Empire's largest ecclesiastical territory was held by the Prince-Bishops of Münster.

== Composition ==
The circle was made up of the following states:

Name	Type of entity	Comments
Arenberg	Principality	Attained imperial immediacy in 1549 under Jean de Ligne, Principality from 1576, raised to Duchy in 1644 gaining the 81th seat to the Reichstag
Aachen	Imperial City	Reichsfreiheit granted by Emperor Frederick I Barbarossa in 1166
Anholt	County	18th Westfalian County, formerly to the Utrecht bishops, reichsfrei since the 14th century, held by the Lords of Gemen, fell to Salm-Salm in 1641
Beilstein	Lordship	Fief of Trier since 1488, held by the Freiherren von Metternich from 1635, Reichsgrafen from 1679
Bentheim	County	Recognized as an imperial county in 1486.
Berg	Duchy	Raised to duchy by King Wenceslaus of Luxembourg in 1380, part of Jülich-Cleves-Berg from 1521 to 1614, with Jülich to Palatinate-Neuburg according to the Treaty of Xanten
Blankenheim-Gerolstein	County	Inherited by Manderscheid in 1468
Bouillon	Duchy	(Beulen) A protectorate of France by the 1679 Peace of Nijmegen but not annexed until 1795
Brakel	Imperial City	Status challenged by the Prince-Bishopric of Paderborn
Cambray	Imperial City	(Kamerich) Status challenged by the Cambrai bishops, declared to a duchy by Emperor Maximilian I of Habsburg in 1510
Cambrésis	Prince-Bishopric	(Kammerich) Diocese established in the 6th century, Reichsfreiheit granted by King Henry II in 1007, archbishopric from 1559, fell to France by the 1679 Peace of Nijmegen
Cleves	Duchy	(Kleve) Part of Jülich-Cleves-Berg from 1521 to 1614, with Mark and Ravensberg to Brandenburg according to the Treaty of Xanten
Cologne	Imperial City	(Köln) Status acknowledged by Emperor Frederick III of Habsburg in 1475
Corvey	Prince-Abbacy	Established in 815 by King Louis the Pious; 69th seat to the Reichstag
Delmenhorst	County	Established by a junior branch of the House of Oldenburg, held by Oldenburg since 1436
Diepholz	County	11th Westfalian County. Established about 1160, to Brunswick-Lüneburg in 1585
Dortmund	Imperial City	Status confirmed by Emperor Frederick II of Hohenstaufen in 1236
Duisburg	Imperial City	Given in pawn to Cleves by King Rudolph of Habsburg in 1290, finally divested of the Imperial title by Elector Frederick William I of Brandenburg in 1674
Düren	Imperial City	Status confirmed by Emperor Otto III in 1000, given in pawn to Jülich by Emperor Frederick II of Hohenstaufen in 1241
Dyck	Lordship	30th Westfalian County, to the Salm-Reifferscheid
East Frisia	Princely County	(Ostfriesland) Raised to Principality 1662, fell to Prussia in 1744
Echternach	Prince-Abbacy	Established about 698 by Saint Willibrord, immediacy granted by King Pepin the Short in 751, annexed by France in 1794
Essen	Abbacy	Established in 845 by Saint Altfrid, immediacy probably granted by King Conrad I (911-918), 10th Prelatess of the Rhine, secularised to Prussia in 1803
Fagnolle	Lordship	Held by the House of Ligne, raised to county in 1770
Gemen	Lordship	Held by the Counts of Holstein-Schauenburg, fell to the House of Limburg-Stirum in 1640
Gimborn	Lordship	Held by the House of Schwarzenberg, Reichsfreiheit granted by Emperor Ferdinand II of Habsburg in 1631, raised to county in 1698, sold to Johann Ludwig von Wallmoden in 1782
Gronsveld	Lordship	Reichsfreiheit granted by Emperor Maximilian I of Habsburg in 1498, raised to county about 1588, annexed by France in 1794
Hallermund	County	Fief of Brunswick-Calenberg around Springe, raised to Imperial county in 1706
Herford	Imperial Abbacy	Nunnery established in 789, immediate abbacy since 1147, confirmed by Emperor Frederick I Barbarossa in 1152, 13th Prelature of the Rhine
Herford	Imperial City	Reichsfreiheit derived from Herford Abbey, challenged by Jülich-Cleves-Berg from 1547, annexed by Brandenburgian Ravensberg in 1652
Holzappel	County	Former Esterau possession of Nassau, granted by Emperor Ferdinand III of Habsburg to his field marshal Peter Melander in 1643, to Anhalt-Bernburg in 1676
Hoya	County	10th Westfalian County. Fief of Brunswick-Lüneburg from 1519, line extinct in 1582
Jülich	Duchy	Reichsfreiheit confirmed by Emperor Louis IV of Wittelsbach in 1328, raised to duchy by Emperor Charles IV of Luxembourg in 1356, part of Jülich-Cleves-Berg 1521 to 1614, with Berg to Palatinate-Neuburg according to the Treaty of Xanten
Kerpen and Lommersum	Lordship	Annexed by Brabant from Cologne after the 1288 Battle of Worringen, inherited by Burgundy in 1406 and the House of Habsburg in 1482, fell to Jülich in 1710, raised to county in 1712, gained Reichsfreiheit in 1786
Kornelimünster	Prince-Abbacy	Established in 814 by Saint Benedict of Aniane
Lemgo	Imperial City	Established about 1190 by Lord Bernard II of Lippe, Reichsfreiheit ascertained by the Imperial Chamber Court
Liège	Prince-Bishopric	(Lüttich) Established about 315 by Saint Maternus of Cologne at Tongeren; 47th seat to the Reichstag
Lingen	County	Emerged from Tecklenburg in 1493, seized as a reverted fief by Emperor Charles V of Habsburg in 1547, with the Burgundian Netherlands to King Philip II of Spain in 1555, conquered by Prince Maurice of Nassau in 1597, inherited by Prussia in 1702
Lippe	Lordship	Lordship established about 1123, raised to county in 1528, split off Lippe-Alverdissen in 1613 (Schaumburg-Lippe from 1643), raised to principality in 1789
Manderscheid	County	Held Schleiden since 1445, raised to Imperial county by Emperor Frederick III of Habsburg in 1457, inherited Blankenheim-Gerolstein in 1468, Sternberg-Manderscheid from 1780, annexed by France in 1794
Mark	County	Established about 1160, acquired Cleves in 1368, part of Jülich-Cleves-Berg from 1521 to 1614, with Cleves and Ravensberg to Brandenburg according to the Treaty of Xanten
Myllendonk	Lordship	Regained Reichsfreiheit in 1700, held by the Counts of Ostein from 1732
Minden	Principality	Former Bishopric of Minden secularised to Brandenburg by the 1648 Peace of Westphalia
Moers	County	First documented in 1186, held by Wied since 1493, to the Counts of Neuenahr in 1519, inherited by Adolf van Nieuwenaar in 1578, by Maurice of Nassau in 1594, to Prussia as principality in 1702
Münster	Prince-Bishopric	Bishopric established by Saint Ludger about 805, reichsfrei territory emerged in 1180 from the Duchy of Saxony, held in personal union by the Wittelsbach Prince-Bishops of Cologne 1612–1650, 1683–1688 and 1723–1801; 43rd seat to the Reichstag
Nassau-Diez	County	Former County of Diez, inherited by Nassau-Dillenburg in 1386, emerged from Nassau-Dillenburg in 1606, principality 1654, inherited Orange in 1702, name changed to Orange-Nassau
Nassau-Dillenburg	Principality	Emerged from Nassau in 1303, split off Orange in 1559, principality in 1654, inherited by Orange-Nassau in 1739, 87th seat to the Reichstag
Nassau-Hadamar	Principality	Emerged from Nassau-Dillenburg in 1606, Principality 1650, line extinct in 1711, inherited by Orange-Nassau in 1743, 86th seat to the Reichstag
Oldenburg	Duchy	Established in Saxony after the deposition of Henry the Lion in 1180, personal union with Denmark 1667–1773, raised to duchy ruled by Holstein-Gottorp in 1774
Osnabrück	Prince-Bishopric	
Paderborn	Prince-Bishopric	29th seat to the Reichstag
Pyrmont	County	
Ravensberg	County	Established about 1140 out of former County of Calvelage, held by Berg since 1346, part of Jülich-Cleves-Berg from 1521 to 1614, with Cleves and Mark to Brandenburg according to the Treaty of Xanten
Reckheim	County	
Reichenstein	Lordship	
Rietberg	County	
Sayn-Altenkirchen	County	1st Rhenish County, half Sayn-Wittgenstein-Sayn, from 1742 to the Principality of Ansbach
Sayn-Hachenburg	County	2nd Rhenish County, half Sayn-Wittgenstein-Sayn, from 1714 to the Margrave of Kirchberg
Schaumburg	County	
Schaumburg-Hesse	County	
Schaumburg-Lippe	County	
Schleiden	County	
Soest	Imperial City	
Spiegelberg	County	12th Westphalian County. From 1557 a fief of Calenberg. Fief held by Nassau-Dietz (and its successors) from 1583 until 1819, when it returned to the Kingdom of Hanover.
Stavelot-Malmedy	Prince-Abbacy	(Stablo-Malmedy) 67th seat to the Reichstag
Steinfurt	County	Reichsfreiheit granted by Emperor Frederick III of Habsburg in 1486, County of Steinfurt in 1495
Tecklenburg	County	Bentheim-Tecklenburg from 1557
Thorn	Princess-Abbacy	
Verden	Duchy	Prince-Bishopric of Verden secularized to the King of Sweden from 1648; 46th seat to the Reichstag
Verden	Imperial City	status unclear and abolished
Virneburg	County	
Warburg	Imperial City	
Werden	Prince-Abbacy	
Wesel	Imperial City	status unclear
Wickrath	County	
Wied	County	
Winneburg	Lordship	
Wittem	Lordship	Raised to a county in 1732.

Transfers
The Duchy of Guelders passed to the Burgundian Circle in 1548
The Duchy of Luxembourg passed to the Burgundian Circle in 1512
The County of Drenthe passed to the Burgundian Circle in 1548
The Lordship of Groningen passed to the Burgundian Circle in 1548
The Lordship of Overijssel passed to the Burgundian Circle in 1548
The Bishopric of Utrecht passed to the Burgundian Circle in 1548
The County of Zutphen passed to the Burgundian Circle in 1548
