= Henry IV of Sayn =

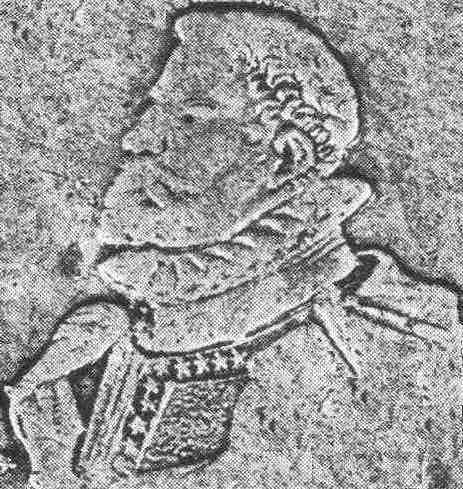
Henry IV, Count of Sayn

Henry IV of Sayn (German: Heinrich IV. von Sayn), Lord of Homburg, Montclair and Meinsberg (1539 – 17 January 1606) was the last Count of Sayn-Sayn and the last male heir of the Sayn-Sponheim family.

Henry was born in 1539, the middle one of the three sons of Count John V of Sayn and Elisabeth of Holstein-Schauenburg, and became a clergyman at the request of his father. Initially a canon (Domherr), from 1565 he became cathedral dean (Domdechant) of Cologne under Archbishops Frederick IV of Wied and Salentin of Isenburg. After the death of his uncle, Count Sebastian II who had ruled the County of Sayn together with Henry's brother, Hermann of Sayn, he inherited the county, which was located north of the River Sieg, with the castle of Freusburg as his residence in 1573. This was also connected with his conversion to Protestantism under the Wittenberg Reformation, which Sebastian and Hermann had introduced to their lands after a long delay in 1561.

Soon afterwards, in February 1574, Henry married Jutta of Mallinkrodt, a former nun whom he had already met when he was the dean of Cologne Cathedral at the monastery of St. Querinus in Neuss. Whether Jutta of Mallinkrodt led the life of a courtesan remains uncertain at this time. But the marriage remained childless and eventually failed. Jutta of Mallinkrodt died on 28 February 1608 in Schloss Friedewald, which Henry had built in Renaissance style. Meanwhile Henry had a liaison with a maid. Two sons (Wilhelm and Karl I Sayn) emerged from this relationship and although they retained the right to use old family crest (the white castle on the black shield), they were not entitled to inherit because of their illegitimate descent.

When Count Hermann died on 17 March 1588, Henry united the county again under his lordship. On 22 December 1589, he decreed the first Sayn church constitution, printed the following year in Frankfurt am Main. This gave instructions to "superintendents, parish lords and other church and school servants on how to behave in the teaching of the divine word, the administration of the holy sacraments, the rituals and other elements of a church service. In this way he contributed further to the renewal of church life in the land of Sayn. He was assisted by Superintendent Magister Leopold Optichtyus, who had studied at Wittenberg and Marburg. Henry also ensured that there was a proper school system in the County of Sayn. For example, he determined in the church constitution of 1589 that "at every parish church a school is to be established in which children are to be taught to read, write and especially learn their catechism."

Henry knew that, after his death, the county would fall to Hermann's only daughter, Anna Elisabeth, who was in a relationship with Count William of Sayn-Wittgenstein. William, however, was a member of the Reformed Church by confession. Henry therefore feared for the survival of the Lutheran denomination in his lands. As he was becoming increasingly frail, Henry handed over the rule of the county on 12 September 1605 to the husband of his niece, who henceforth called himself William III, Count of Sayn-Wittgenstein-Sayn, believing he had guaranteed the survival of the Lutheran denomination in Sayn. But William expelled all Lutheran pastors from the country after a year and appointed Reformed prelates instead.

Henry died on 17 January 1606 at Sayn Castle, the seat of the Counts of Sayn and was interred on 17 March 1606 in the family crypt below the presbytery of the Lutheran church in Hachenburg.

One of his positive legacies was that he gave Freusburg Castle its present appearance; he was the architect of the south wing with its oriel borne on fabulous stone animals. The Count was also the architect of Schloss Altenkirchen, which has since been demolished. French chateaux, which he saw on a trip to France, inspired him to design the castle in Friedewald that today is considered a "pearl among the princely castles of the German Renaissance".

== Literature ==
- Matthias Dahlhoff: Geschichte der Grafschaft Sayn. Dillenburg, 1874.
- Hans Fritzsche: Graf Heinrich IV. von Sayn, in: Lebensbilder aus dem Kreis Altenkirchen. Altenkirchen, 1975.
- Friedrich Hennes: Zur Geschichte der Reformation in der Grafschaft Sayn. in:Festschrift zum 400jährigen Jubiläum der Reformation in der Grafschaft Sayn. Düsseldorf, 1961.
