= Johannetta, Countess of Sayn-Altenkirchen =

Johannetta of Sayn-Wittgenstein

Countess of Sayn-Altenkirchen
- Reign: 1648–1701

Landgravine consort of Hesse-Braubach
- Tenure: 1647–1651

Duchess consort of Saxe-Marksuhl
- Tenure: 1662–1671

Duchess consort of Saxe-Eisenach
- Tenure: 1671–1686
- Born: 27 August 1632; Sayn-Wittgenstein-Sayn
- Died: 28 September 1701 (aged 69); Jena
- Spouse: John, Landgrave of Hesse-Braubach; John George I, Duke of Saxe-Eisenach
- Issue: Eleonore Erdmuthe Luise, Margravine of Brandenburg-Ansbach and Electress of Saxony; Frederick August, Hereditary Prince of Saxe-Eisenach; John George II, Duke of Saxe-Eisenach; John William, Duke of Saxe-Eisenach; Fredericka Elisabeth, Duchess of Saxe-Weissenfels
- House: Sponheim
- Father: Ernest, Count of Sayn-Wittgenstein-Sayn
- Mother: Louise Juliane of Erbach

Johannetta, Countess of Sayn-Wittgenstein-Sayn-Altenkirchen (27 August 1632 – 28 September 1701), was Sovereign Countess of Sayn-Wittgenstein-Sayn-Altenkirchen from 1648 to 1701. She was also Landgravine of Hesse-Braubach by marriage to John, Landgrave of Hesse-Braubach, and Duchess of Saxe-Marksuhl (later Saxe-Eisenach) by marriage to John George I, Duke of Saxe-Eisenach.

== Life ==
Born in Wittgenstein, she was the sixth and youngest child of Ernest, Count of Sayn-Wittgenstein-Sayn and his wife, Countess Louise Juliane of Erbach. She was born three months after her father's death, on 22 May 1632. She was probably named after her paternal aunt Johannetta of Sayn-Wittgenstein-Sayn, by marriage Countess of Erbach-Erbach.

=== Succession ===
In his will, Count Ernest left his domains to his only son Louis, under the regency of his mother Louise Juliane during his minority. In case he would die prematurely, his two surviving daughters (Ernestine Salentine and Johannetta) would inherit the county.

When Count Louis died four years later (16 July 1636), the male line of Sayn-Wittgenstein-Sayn died out. A violent dispute over his inheritance erupted between the Dowager Countess and the three half-brothers of her late husband (sons of Count William III of Sayn-Wittgenstein-Hachenburg and his first wife, Anna Elisabeth of Sayn, only daughter and heiress of Count Hermann of Sayn); in consequence, the Sayn inheritance only could be passed to Ernest's descendants, the last of whom are the sisters Ernestine and Johannetta.

After two months, one of them, Count Louis Albert of Sayn-Wittgenstein-Neumagen, finally forced Louise Juliane to surrender the county to him and his brothers. In the meanwhile, Count Christian, Louis Albert's youngest brother besieged Altenkirchen and the Electorate of Mainz besieged Hachenburg, who was forced to surrender when the food ran out; without options, Louise Juliane and her daughters fled to Freusburg. When the Electorate of Trier prepared to besiege Freusburg, they fled to Friedewald, where they found safety. Louise Juliane sued her in-laws before the Reichskammergericht and the Emperor. She sent her councillors to Münster and Osnabrück where the Peace of Westphalia of 1648 was being negotiated. The rights of Johannetta and Ernestine were recognized and, with Swedish assistance, one part of the county after the other was returned to her.

During her family exile in Friedewald, Johannetta (aged 15) married on 30 September 1647 to Landgrave John of Hesse-Braubach (aged 37), younger brother of George II, Landgrave of Hesse-Darmstadt; however, Louise Juliane retained the regency of the County of Sayn-Wittgenstein-Sayn for her two daughters. After four years of childless union, Landgrave John died on 1 April 1651 in Bad Ems.

=== Rule ===
One year later (1652), Louise Juliane finally handed over the County of Sayn to her daughters, who was divided in two parts: Sayn-Wittgenstein-Sayn-Altenkirchen (for Johannetta) and Sayn-Wittgenstein-Sayn-Hachenburg (for Ernestine, who recently married Count Salentin Ernest of Mandersheid-Blankenheim).

In Wallau on 29 May 1661, Johannetta (aged 29) married secondly to Prince John George (aged 27), third surviving son of William, Duke of Saxe-Weimar.

After the death of Duke William (1662), his two older sons inherited almost all the family domains; as result, John George only received an income from the new duchy of Saxe-Eisenach and the small town of Marksuhl as residence. For this, Johannetta and her husband mainly resided in her County, where all her children were born.

The successive death of Dukes Adolf William (1668) and William August of Saxe-Eisenach (1671), enabled John George to inherit this part of the paternal domains. Since them, Johannetta became Duchess consort of Saxe-Eisenach.

Johannetta died in Jena aged 69, having survived her second husband and six of her children. She was buried, alongside her second husband, in the Georgenkirche, Eisenach.

The County of Sayn-Wittgenstein-Sayn-Altenkirchen remained united to the Duchy of Saxe-Eisenach until 1741, when Johannetta's male line died out. Then, the county was inherited by Charles William Frederick, Margrave of Brandenburg-Ansbach, grandson of Eleonore Erdmuthe, Johannetta's eldest daughter. In 1803, the county was mediatised to Nassau-Weilburg.

=== Issue ===
She had eight children:

1. Eleonore Erdmuthe Luise (Friedewald, 13 April 1662 – Schloss Pretzsch, 19 September 1696), married firstly on 4 November 1681 to Johann Friedrich, Margrave of Brandenburg-Ansbach, and secondly on 17 April 1692 to Johann Georg IV, Elector of Saxony. By her first marriage, Eleonore was the mother of the Queen Caroline of Brandenburg-Ansbach, wife of the King George II of Great Britain.
2. Frederick August, Hereditary Prince of Saxe-Eisenach (Friedewald, 30 October 1663 – killed in battle, Pressburg, 19 September 1684).
3. John George II, Duke of Saxe-Eisenach (Friedewald, 24 July 1665 – Eisenach, 10 November 1698).
4. John William, Duke of Saxe-Eisenach (Friedewald, 17 October 1666 – Eisenach, 14 January 1729).
5. Maximilian Henry (Friedewald, 17 October 1666 – Altenkirchen, 23 July 1668), twin of John William.
6. Louise (Friedewald, 18 April 1668 – Altenkirchen, 26 June 1669).
7. Fredericka Elisabeth (Altenkirchen, 5 May 1669 – Langensalza, 12 November 1730), married on 7 January 1698 to Johann Georg, Duke of Saxe-Weissenfels.
8. Ernest Gustav (Friedewald, 28 August 1672 – Altenkirchen, 16 November 1672).

Johannetta, Countess of Sayn-Altenkirchen House of Sponheim Born: 27 August 1632 Died: 28 September 1701
German royalty
New creation	Duchess consort of Saxe-Marksuhl; 1662–1671	Merged to the Duchy of Saxe-Eisenach
Vacant Title last held by Marie Elisabeth of Brunswick-Wolfenbüttel	Duchess consort of Saxe-Eisenach; 1671–1686	Vacant Title next held by Sophie Charlotte of Württemberg
