= Ernestine of Sayn-Wittgenstein =

Ernestine of Sayn-Wittgenstein (Ernestine Salentine; 23 April 1626 – 13 October 1661), was a German ruler, Sovereign Countess of Sayn-Wittgenstein-Hachenburg in 1648-1661. She was also Countess consort of Manderscheid-Blankenheim by marriage to Count Salentin Ernest of Mandersheid-Blankenheim.

== Life ==
Born in Hachenburg, she was the eldest child of Ernest, Count of Sayn-Wittgenstein-Sayn and Countess Louise Juliane of Erbach. She was probably named after her father.

In his will, Count Ernest left his domains to his only son Louis, under the regency of his mother Louise Juliane during his minority. In case he would die prematurely, his two surviving daughters (Ernestine and Johannetta) would inherit the County.

=== Succession ===
When Count Louis died four years later (16 July 1636), the male line of Sayn-Wittgenstein-Sayn died out. A violent dispute over his inheritance erupted between the Dowager Countess and the three half-brothers of her late husband (sons of Count William III and his second wife Anna Ottilie of Nassau-Weilburg), who claimed the succession of the whole County. After two months, one of them, Count Louis Albert of Sayn-Wittgenstein-Neumagen, finally forced Louise Juliane to surrender the County to him and his brothers.

In the meanwhile, Count Christian, Louis Albert's youngest brother besieged Altenkirchen and the Electorate of Mainz besieged Hachenburg, who was forced to surrender when the food ran out; without options, Louise Juliane and her daughters fled to Freusburg. When the Electorate of Trier prepared to besiege Freusburg, they fled to Friedewald, where they found safety.

=== Rule ===
Louise Juliane sued her in-laws before the Reichskammergericht and the Emperor. She sent her councillors to Münster and Osnabrück where the Peace of Westphalia of 1648 was being negotiated. The rights of Ernestine and Johannetta were recognized and, with Swedish assistance, one part of the county after the other was returned to her.

In Hachenburg on 21 October 1651, Ernestine married Count Salentin Ernest of Mandersheid-Blankenheim (6 August 1630 – 18 February 1705). They had seven children.

One year later (1652), Louise Juliane finally handed over the County of Sayn to her daughters, who was divided in two parts: Sayn-Wittgenstein-Sayn-Hachenburg (for Ernestine) and Sayn-Wittgenstein-Sayn-Altenkirchen (for Johannetta, who was at that time Dowager Landgravine of Hesse-Braubach).

== Legacy ==
Sayn-Wittgenstein-Hachenburg was inherited by Maximilian Joseph in 1661 following Ernestine's death, and after his death in 1675 was inherited by his youngest surviving sister Magdalena Christina, who through marriage in 1715 passed the County to the Burgraves of Kirchberg until 1799, when by marriage was inherited the Counts of Nassau-Weilburg and to the Counts of Sayn-Wittgenstein-Berleburg in 1803. Through the female line the title is currently held by the Grand Duke of Luxembourg.

== Issue ==
She had seven children:

1. Anna Louise (11 April 1654 – 23 April 1692), married on 24 October 1675 to Maurice Henry, Prince of Nassau-Hadamar.
2. Maximilian Joseph Ferdinand (30 April 1655 – 1675).
3. Anna Salome (1656 – 8 December 1739).
4. Franziska Eleonora Clara (4 February 1657 – 30 September 1714).
5. Magdalena Christina (15 March 1658 – 19 October 1715), married to George Louis, Burgrave of Kirchberg from whom she had 10 children.
6. Salome Sophia Ursula (1659 – 29 June 1678), married to Louis Frederick, Count of Wied-Runkel.
7. Juliana Margareta (1660 – 5 February 1674).
