= Sayn-Homburg =

Medieval county of Germany

County of Sayn-Homburg Grafschaft Sayn-Homburg
- 1283–1384
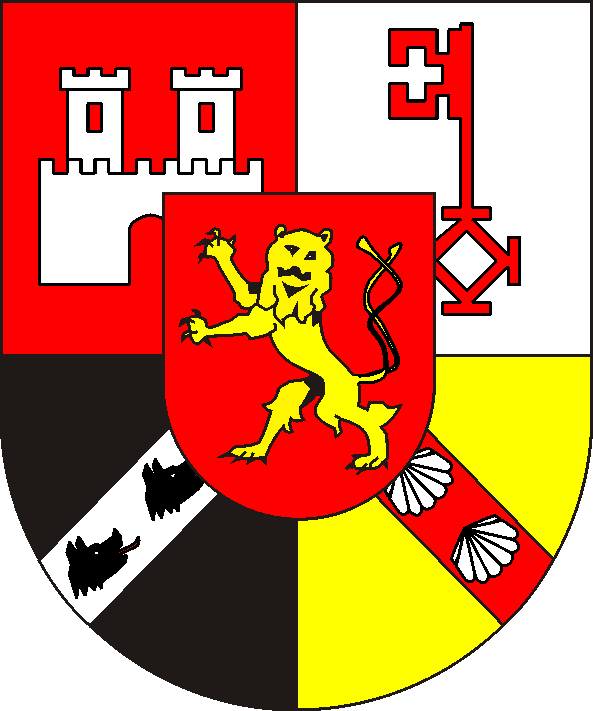
- Coat of arms
- Status: State of the Holy Roman Empire
- Capital: Homburg
- Government: Principality
- Historical era: Middle Ages
  - Partitioned from Sponheim-Sayn: 1283 1283
  - Count marries heiress to Wittgenstein: 1345
  - Counties merged: 1384
Preceded by	Succeeded by
Sponheim-Sayn	Sayn-Wittgenstein

Coat of arms of the Lordhip of Homburg

Sayn-Homburg (not to be confused with the later state of Sayn-Wittgenstein-Homburg) was a medieval county of Germany with its seat at Homburg Castle. It was created as a partition of Sponheim-Sayn in 1283. In 1345, Salentin, the son of Count Godfrey, married the heiress of Wittgenstein and the Counties were united and, on his death, merged to form the County of Sayn-Wittgenstein.

== Counts of Sayn-Homburg (1283–1384) ==
- Engelbert (1283–1336)
- Godfrey (1336–84)

To County of Sayn-Wittgenstein

== Ancestral seat ==
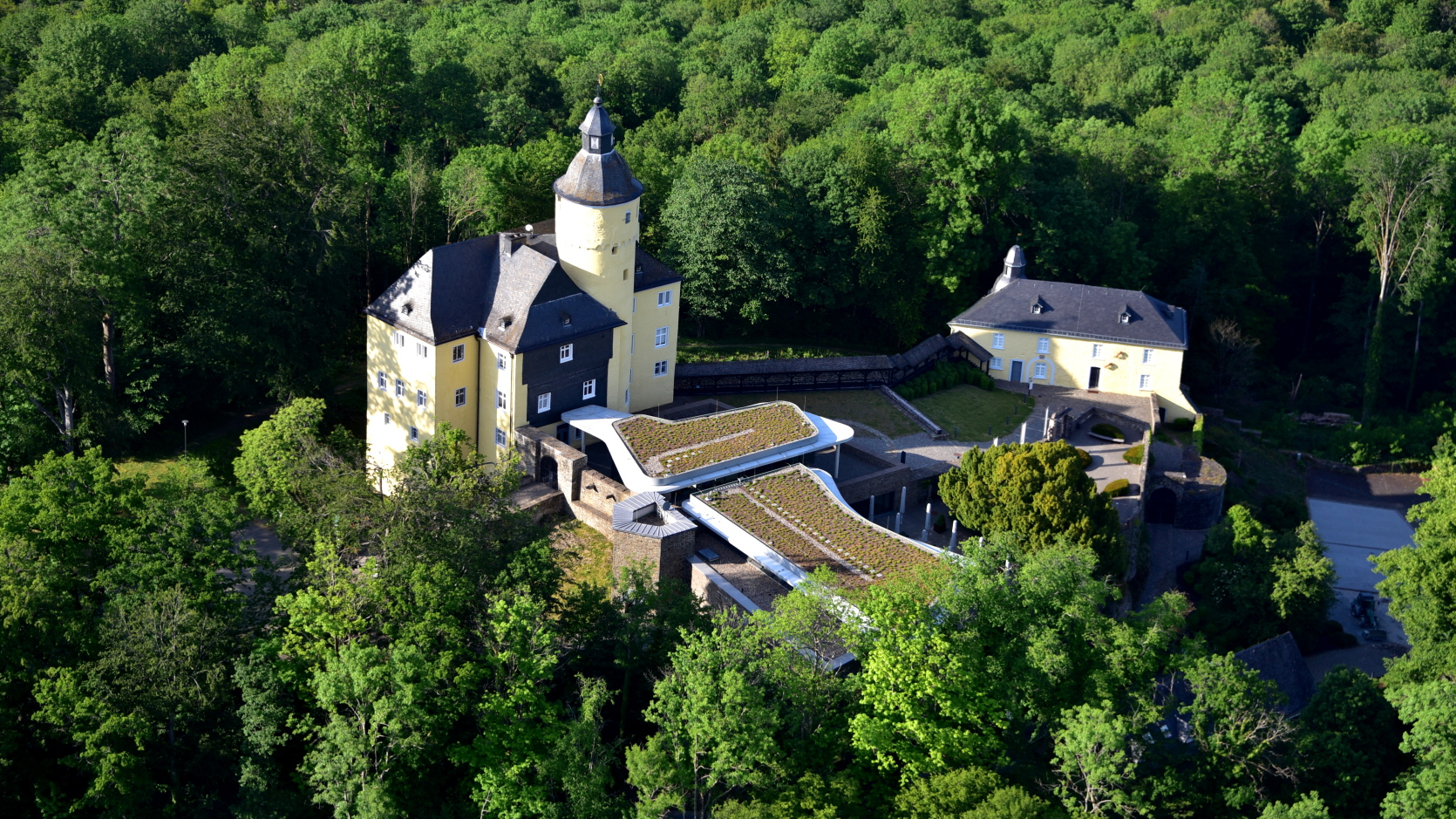
Homburg Castle
