= John of Hesse-Braubach =

German general (1609–1651)

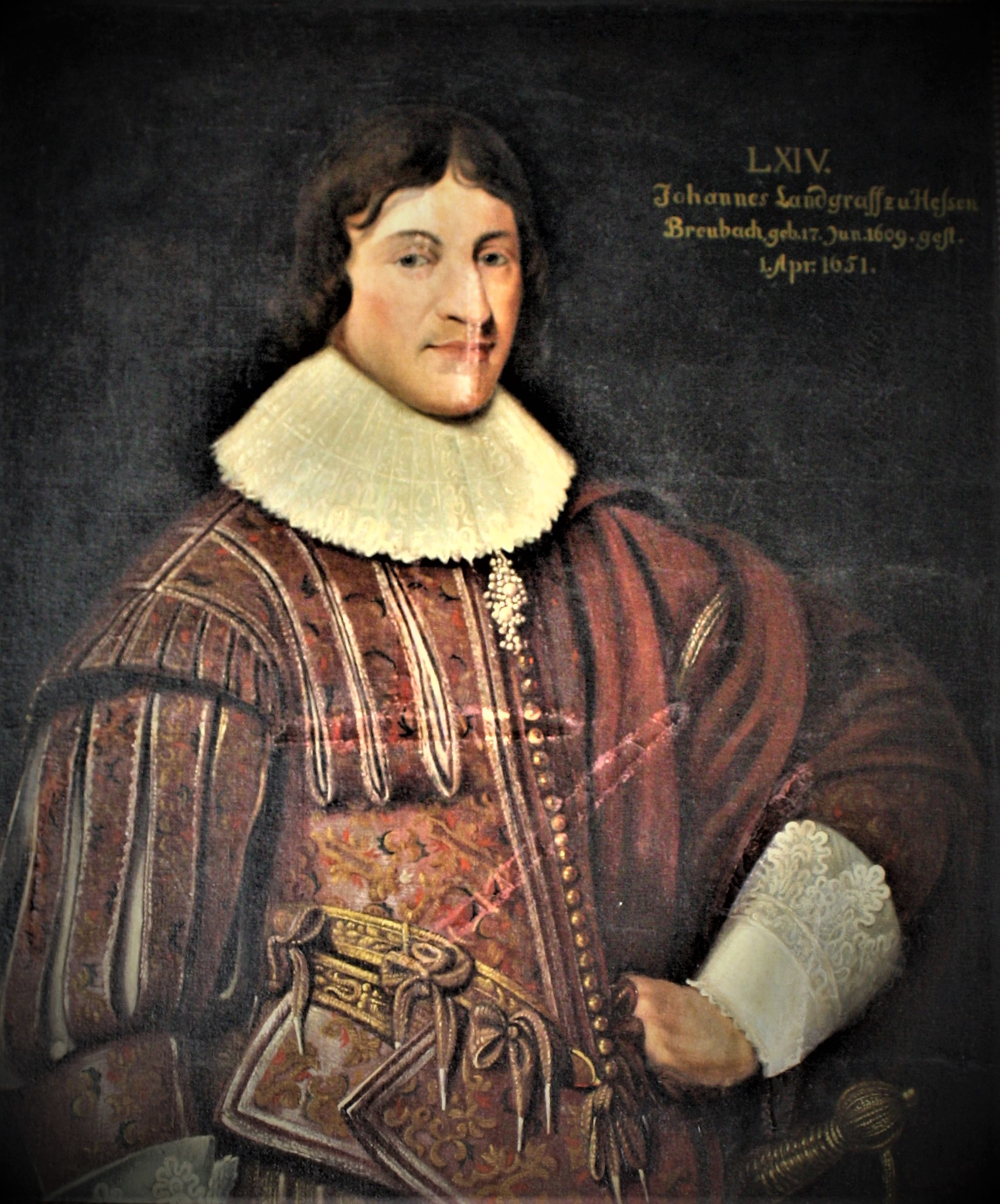
Portrait of John of Hesse-Braubach

John of Hesse-Braubach (17 June 1609, Darmstadt – 1 April 1651, Ems) was a German nobleman and general. He was born into the House of Hesse-Darmstadt and later became Landgrave of Hesse-Braubach.

== Biography ==
Johann was born as the seventh child and second surviving son of Louis V, Landgrave of Hesse-Darmstadt and his wife, Magdalene of Brandenburg, daughter of John George, Elector of Brandenburg.

He joined the Spanish army in early 1626, while his father was still alive, and as a captain received a company of lancers (une compagnie de lances de 200 chevaux). This did not, however, prevent him from undertaking a Grand Tour to Italy in 1627/28. From 1631 to 1635, as a colonel, later a major general, he commanded a newly recruited Swedish regiment, and after another change of sides in 1636, he took command of the Hessian-Darmstadt troops in the Imperial army. In 1641/42, again on the opposing side, he was commander-in-chief of the Brunswick-Lüneburg troops.
As the Great War drew to a close, in 1643 he had his elder brother George II transfer to him the Lordship of Eppstein and the Hessian-Darmstadt share of the Lower County of Katzenelnbogen, including the district of Braubach and Marksburg Castle.

His residence in Darmstadt was the northeast corner house on the market square, opposite the residential palace and built around 1600, which was henceforth called the "Landgrave Johann House." In the Fruitbearing Society, to which Johann belonged from 1639, he was known as "the Stately."
Johann died in the spring of 1651 during a spa treatment in Ems from a recurring and very severe stroke.

=== Personal life ===
He was married on 30 September 1647 to Countess Johannette of Sayn-Wittgenstein, the daughter of Ernest, Count of Sayn-Wittgenstein-Sayn (1594–1632) and his wife, Countess Louise Juliane of Erbach. The marriage remained childless. Johannette later married Johann Georg I, Duke of Saxe-Eisenach and had issue.
