= Sponheim-Sayn =

County of the Holy Roman Empire (1261–1283)

County of Sponheim-Sayn Grafschaft Sponheim-Sayn
- 1261–1283
- Status: County
- Historical era: Middle Ages
  - Partitioned from Sponheim-Eberstein: 1261
  - Partitioned into Sayn and Sayn-Homburg: 1283
Preceded by	Succeeded by
Sponheim-Eberstein	Sayn; Sayn-Homburg

Sponheim-Sayn was a county of the Holy Roman Empire in what is now Rhineland-Palatinate and North Rhine-Westphalia, Germany. It was created as a partition of Sponheim-Starkenburg in 1261, and comprised the lands of the former county of Sayn. In 1283, it was divided into Sayn and Sayn-Homburg.

== Count of Sponheim-Sayn ==
- Godfrey I (1261–83)
