= Sayn-Wittgenstein-Karlsburg =

Cadet branch of the House of Sayn-Wittgenstein-Berleburg

County of Sayn-Wittgenstein-Karlsburg Grafschaft Sayn-Wittgenstein-Karlsburg
- 1694–1806
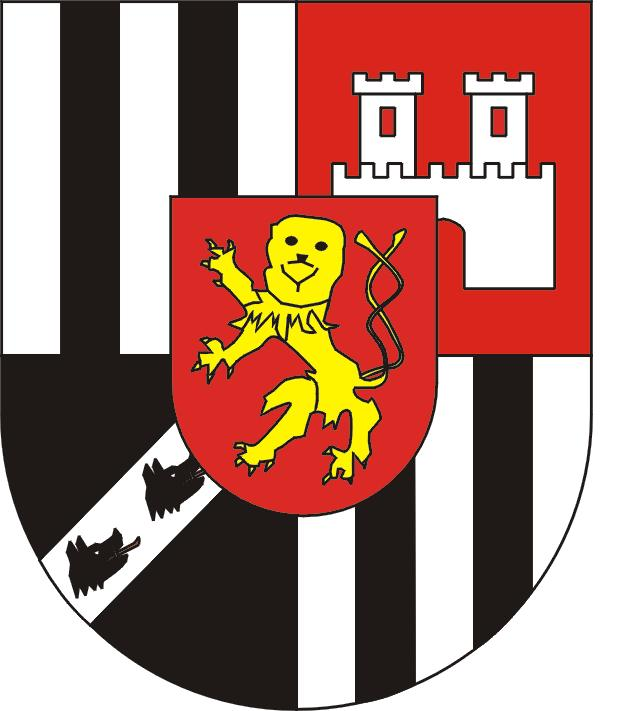
- Coat of arms
- Status: State of the Holy Roman Empire
- Capital: Berleburg
- Government: Principality
- Historical era: Middle Ages
  - Partitioned from S-W-Berleburg: 1607 1694
  - Mediatised to Hesse: 1806
  - Annexed by Prussia: 1816
Preceded by	Succeeded by
Image missing / Sayn-Wittgenstein-Berleburg	Grand Duchy of Hesse

Coat of arms of the Counts of Sayn-Wittgenstein

Sayn-Wittgenstein-Karlsburg was a cadet branch of Sayn-Wittgenstein-Berleburg, created by in 1694 Graf Casimir (r. 1693–1741) for his younger brother, Count Karl Wilhelm (1694–1749). In 1806, the county was mediatised by the Grand Duchy of Hesse, while in 1816, it became annexed by Prussia. This cadet line of Sayn-Wittgenstein became extinct with the death of Count Christian Ludwig Karl zu Sayn-Wittgenstein-Karlsburg (1786–1867).

== Counts of Sayn-Wittgenstein-Karlsburg (1694–1867) ==
- Karl Wilhelm (1694–1749)
  - Adolph Ludwig Wilhelm (1740–1814)
    - Christian Ludwig Karl (1786–1867)

== Gallery ==
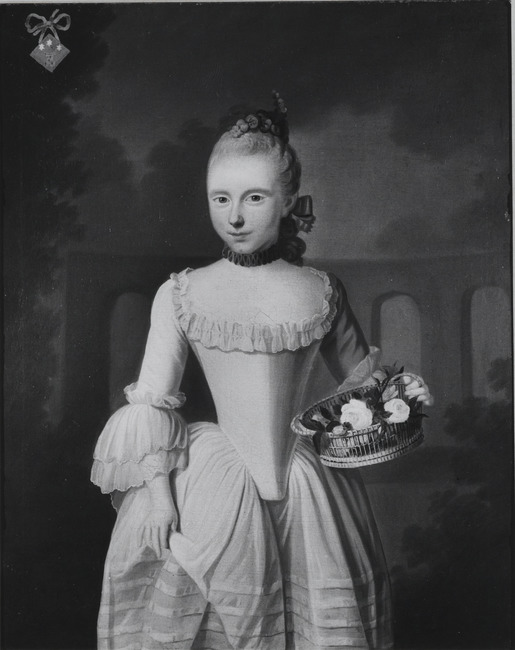
Countess Sara Cornelia Jacoba zu Sayn-Wittgenstein-Karlsburg, née Baroness du Tour (1751-1811)
