= Sayn-Wittgenstein-Hachenburg =

County located in Rhineland-Palatinate (1648–1827)

County of Sayn-Wittgenstein-Hachenburg
- 1648–1827
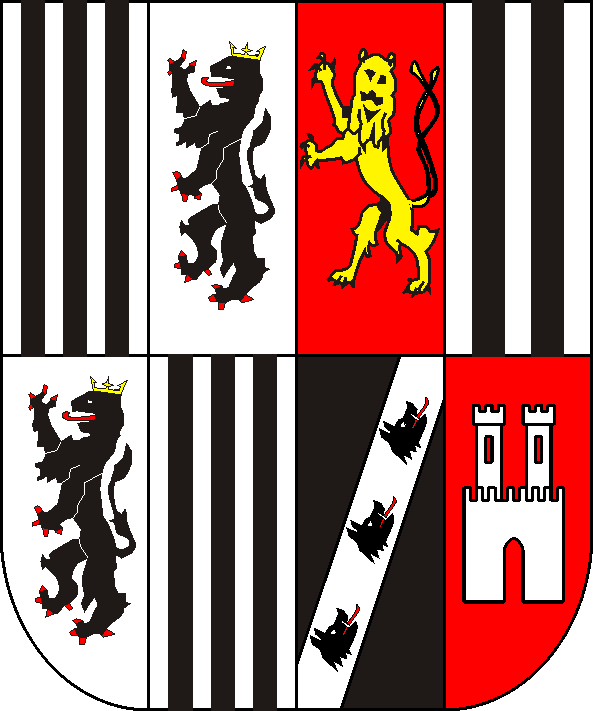
- Coat of arms
- Status: State of the Holy Roman Empire; In personal union with Manderscheid-Blankenheim; (1661-1675); In personal union with Kirchberg; (1715-1776)
- Government: Feudal County
- Countess of Sayn-Hachenburg
  - 1648–1661: Ernestine Salentine (first)
  - 1776–1827: Louise Isabelle (last)
- Historical era: Early Modern Period
  - Established: 1648
  - Disestablished: 1827
Preceded by
Sayn-Wittgenstein-Sayn
- Today part of: Rhineland-Palatinate

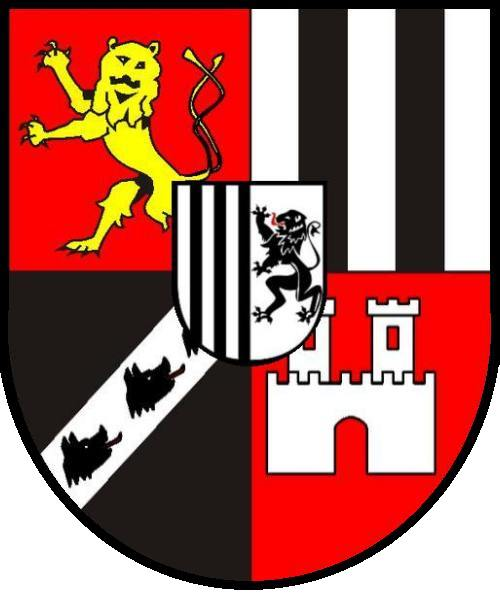
Coat of arms of Sayn-Wittgenstein-Hachenburg

Sayn-Wittgenstein-Hachenburg (sometimes called Sayn-Hachenburg) was a German County located in Rhineland-Palatinate, near the river Sieg.

== History ==
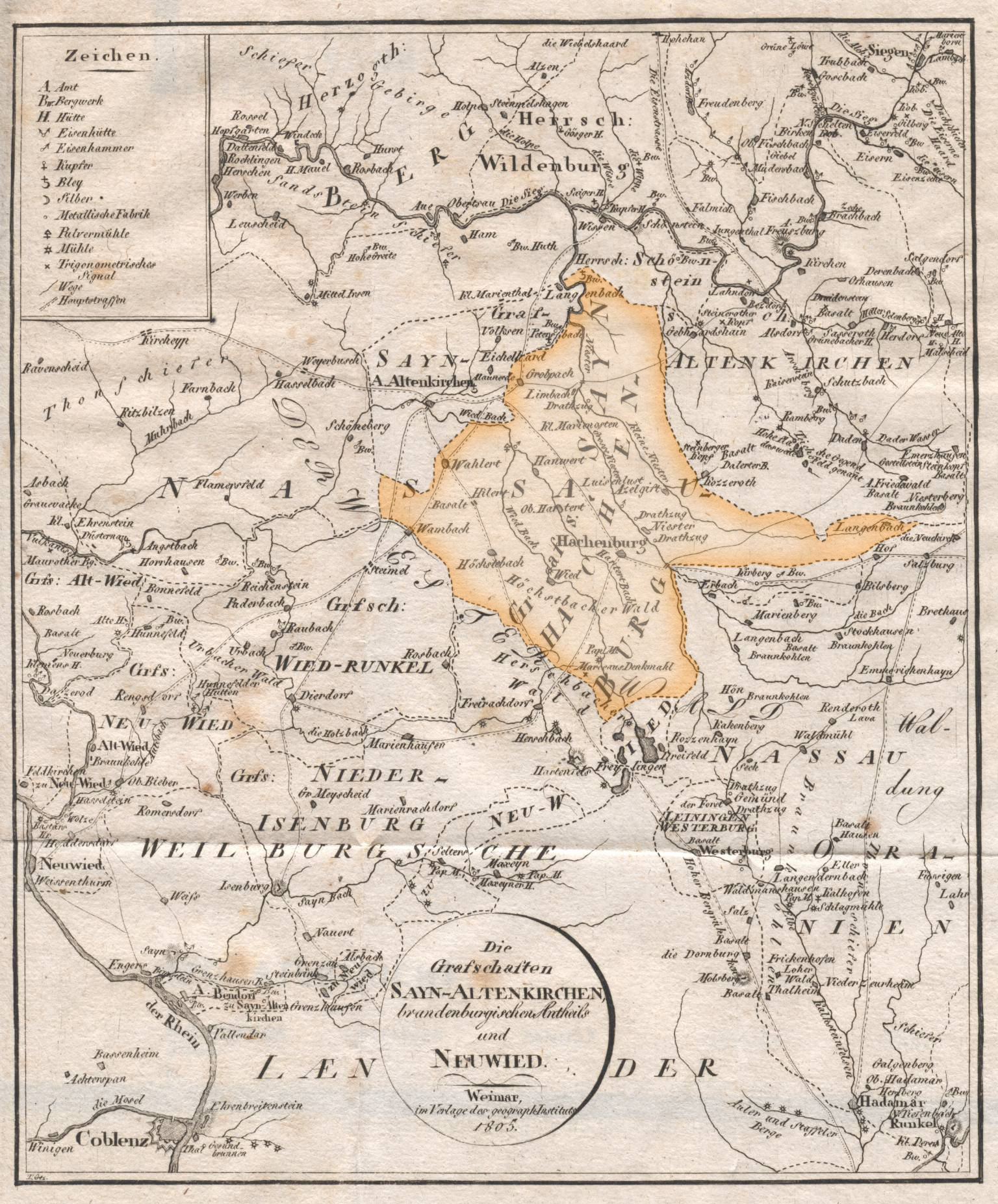
Map of the County of Sayn-Hachenburg (1805)

When Count William III of Sayn-Wittgenstein-Sayn died in 1623 without clear heirs, the Archbishop of Cologne occupied the vacant County until the succession was settled. It was settled by treaty in 1648, when the county was given jointly to Countesses Ernestine and Johanetta, two sisters who were granddaughters of Count William, and their mother Dowager Countess Louise Juliane made regent.

But shortly after the treaty, the county was split between the two. Ernestine's portion was called "Sayn-Wittgenstein-Hachenburg". Johanetta's was "Sayn-Wittgenstein-Sayn-Altenkirchen" (or Sayn-Altenkirchen for short). Their mother remained regent for both counties until 1652, when Johanetta and Ernestine separately ruled their respective Counties. Sayn-Wittgenstein-Hachenburg was inherited by Countess Magdalena Christina in 1661 following Ernestine's death. It passed to the Burgraves of Kirchberg in 1715, and to the Princes of Nassau-Weilburg in 1799. The title passed through the female line and is held by the Grand Duke of Luxembourg.

== Rulers of Sayn-Hachenburg (1648–1827) ==
- Ernestine Salentine (1648–1661)
- Louise Juliane (1648–1652) – Regent
- Maximilian Joseph (1661–1675), also Count of Manderscheid-Blankenheim
- Magdalena Christina (1675–1715), also Burgravine consort of Kirchberg
- George Frederick (1715–1749), also Burgrave of Kirchberg
- William Louis (1749–1751), also Burgrave of Kirchberg
- William George (1751–1777), also Burgrave of Kirchberg
- Louise Isabelle (1776–1827), Princess consort of Nassau-Weilburg
