= Homburg Castle =

Hill castle in Nümbrecht, Germany

- Schloss Homburg
- Nümbrecht, Bergisches Land
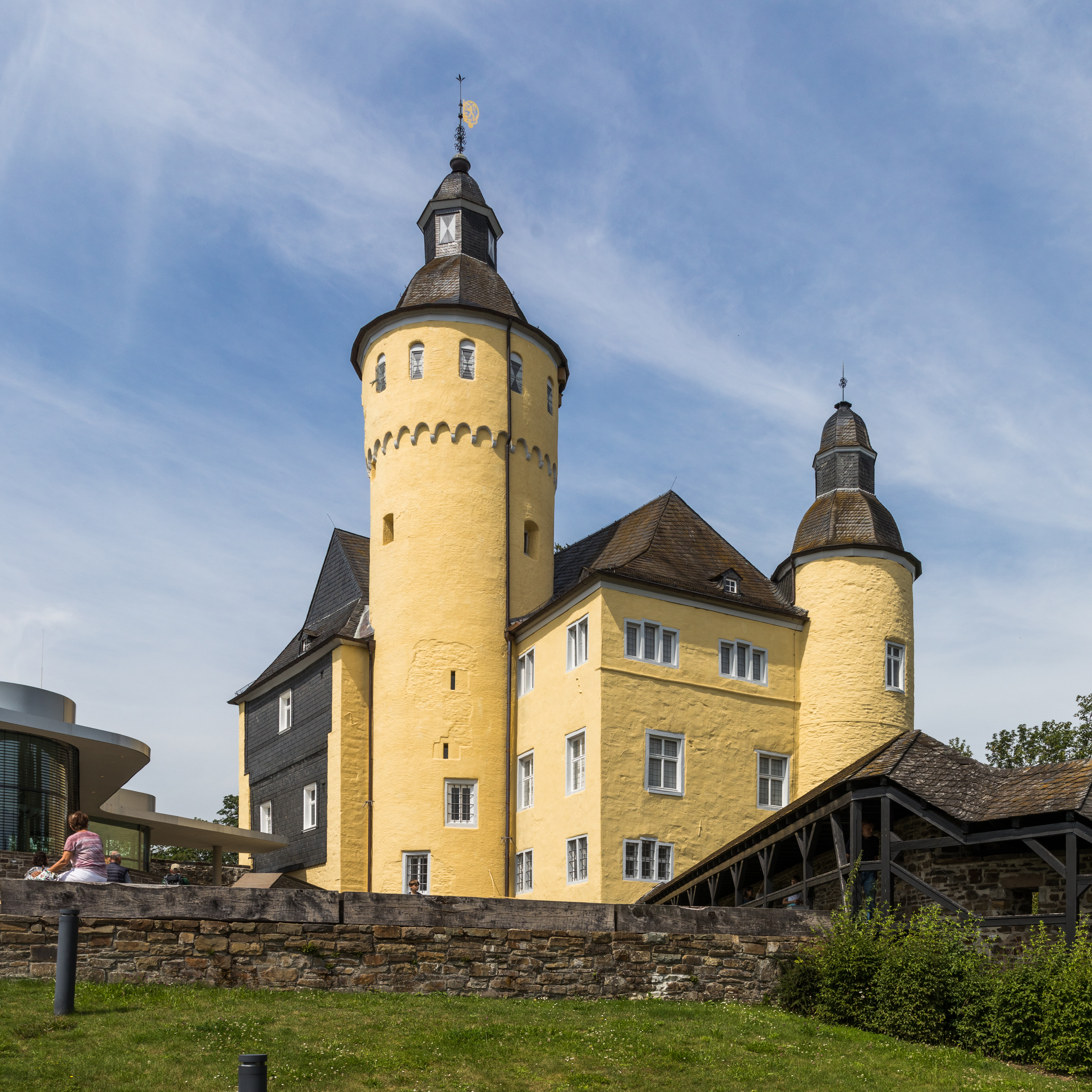
- Homburg Castle in 2003

Site information
- Owner: Oberbergischer Kreis, Museum
- Controlled by: Oberbergischer Kreis
- Open to the public: Yes
- Condition: Fully preserved

Location
- Coordinates: 50.915°N 7.5385°E
- Height: 260 m

Site history
- Built: 1276
- Materials: Rubblestone

Homburg Castle is an old hill castle in Nümbrecht, Oberbergischer Kreis in the German state of North Rhine-Westphalia.

== History and construction ==
The Homburg is first mentioned in records of 1276. Gottfried I of Sayn from the House of Sponheim (1247-1283/84) transferred his castrum Homburg to the German King Rudolf of Habsburg, in order to place it under his protection. He received the castle back as an inheritance. The castle was the residence of the Counts of Homburg, an imperial fiefdom (Reichsherrschaft).

From 1635 Count Ernst von Sayn-Wittgenstein altered the castle to its present-day appearance. One hundred years later the line of Sayn-Wittgenstein-Berleburg took over its management; the structure then fell into disrepair. Not until 1904 was its decline halted and, in 1926, a museum, founded by Hermann Conrad, took over the premises. Today it is the Museum of Oberbergisches Kreis.

In 1999 during an excavation, a stone keep of about 12.5 metres diameter was uncovered. Experts estimate that it dates to the 11th century. A consequence of this was that the history of the castle had to be reassessed to that time.

At the beginning of 2005 the district council decided to upgrade the castle. Their plans included inter alia the expansion of the 'Red House' (Rotes Haus) and the construction of a central cash desk and toilet area. The old orangery was to be torn down and replaced by a new two-storey administration and exhibition building.

== Other buildings on the castle site ==
In the immediate vicinity are a sawmill and mill with a bakery. In addition, in the former farmhouse building, the 'Red House', the castle's tithe barn, is the headquarters of the Oberberg Biological Station, whose main fields of work are the scientific and practical support of the Oberberg nature reserves and various landscape conservation projects.

== Homburg Castle nature trail ==
The nature trail was established in 2004. This is a circular walk that was the initiative of the Oberberg Biological Station and German Forest Conservation Society (Schutzgemeinschaft Deutscher Wald).

The footpath and nature trail starts at the castle and runs through Homburg Bröl and Huppichteroth, past the historic Holstein Mill and the Dicke Steine back to Homburg Castle. Nine information stations have been set up along the route which describe the natural environment around Homburg Castle and the Bröl meadow to walkers.

The stations are:

- Forests around Homburg Castle (Wälder um Schloss Homburg). Here the visitor can learn about the individual types of trees species using viewing boxes.
- The Oak (Die Eiche). Here the life of an oak is explained with the help of annular rings, and the height of an oak can be measured.
- Cultural Landscape (Kulturlandschaft). The diverse cultural landscape is explored together with the individual habitats using a telescope.
- Village Life (Lebensraum Dorf). This explains how man and nature live side-by-side. Several bird calls may be heard here.
- Hedge (Hecke). The planting of hedges as well as the life in the hedge is explained using diagrams and a picture board.
- Tree-Top Platform (Baumkronen-Plattform). A platform built in the tree tops offers an unusual perspective with information boards that describe life in this part of the wood.
- Bröl Meadow (Brölaue). Here the water level and the animal life in the Bröl stream is demonstrated using viewing screens and a rotating wheel.
- Dicke Steine. The origin of this natural monument is clearly explained.
- Woodpecker Wood (Spechtwald). At this station there is a view of a spotted woodpecker nest.

The Homburg Castle nature trail is about 2.8 km long and the walk generally takes 1.5 to 2 hours.

== Pictures ==
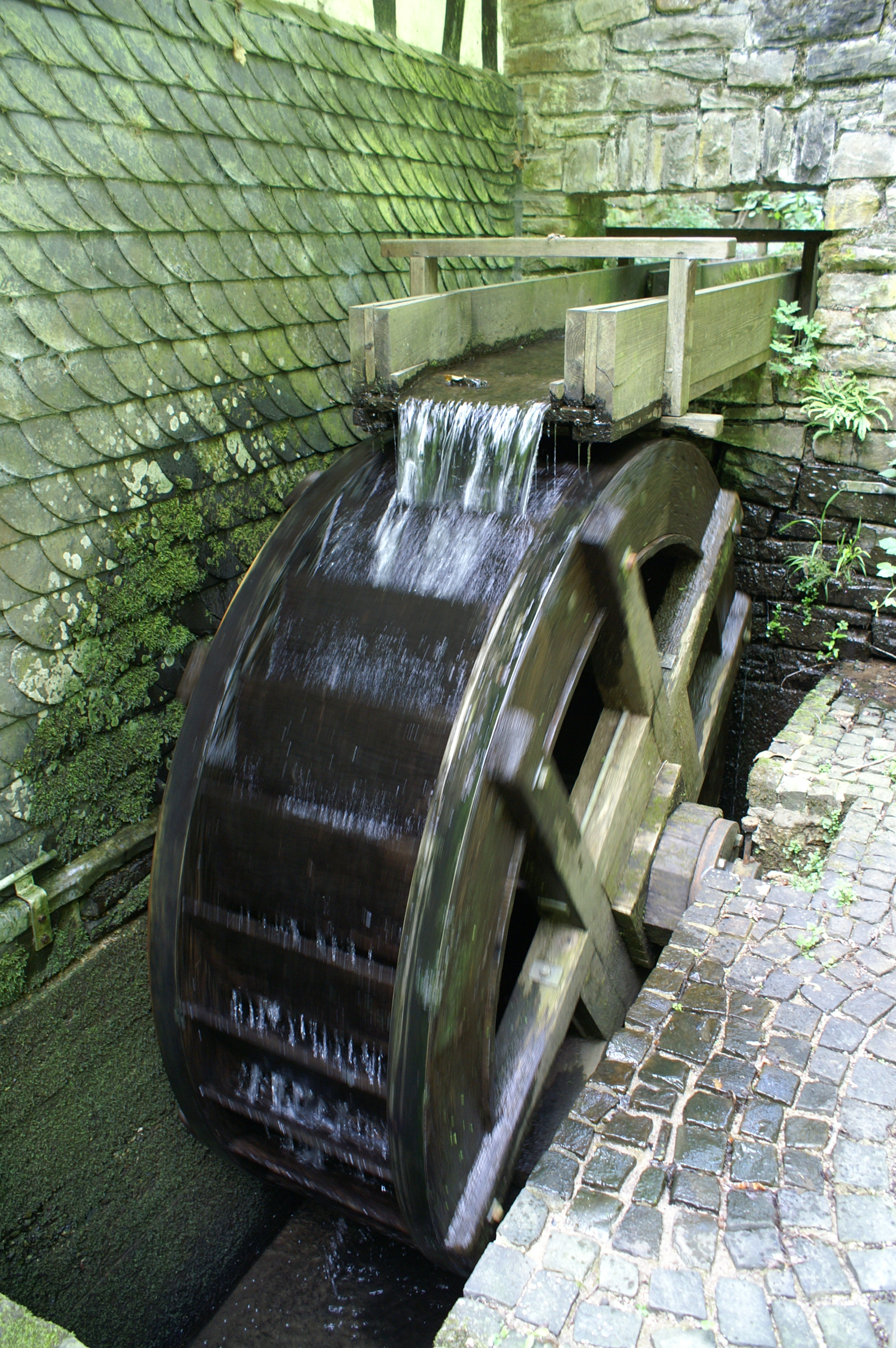
The water wheel of the grain- and sawmill at Homburg Castle

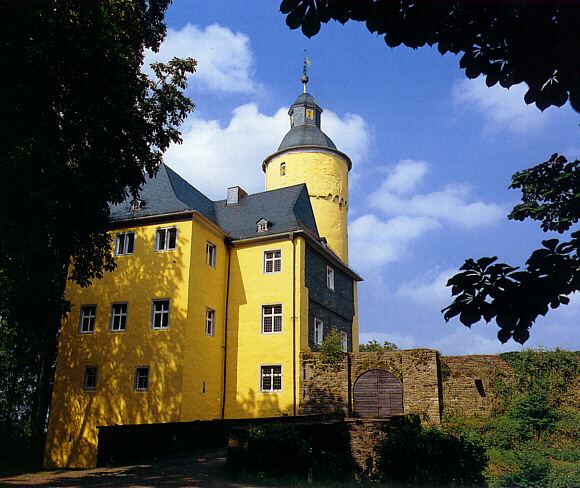
Homburg Castle
