= Friedewald =

- Municipality
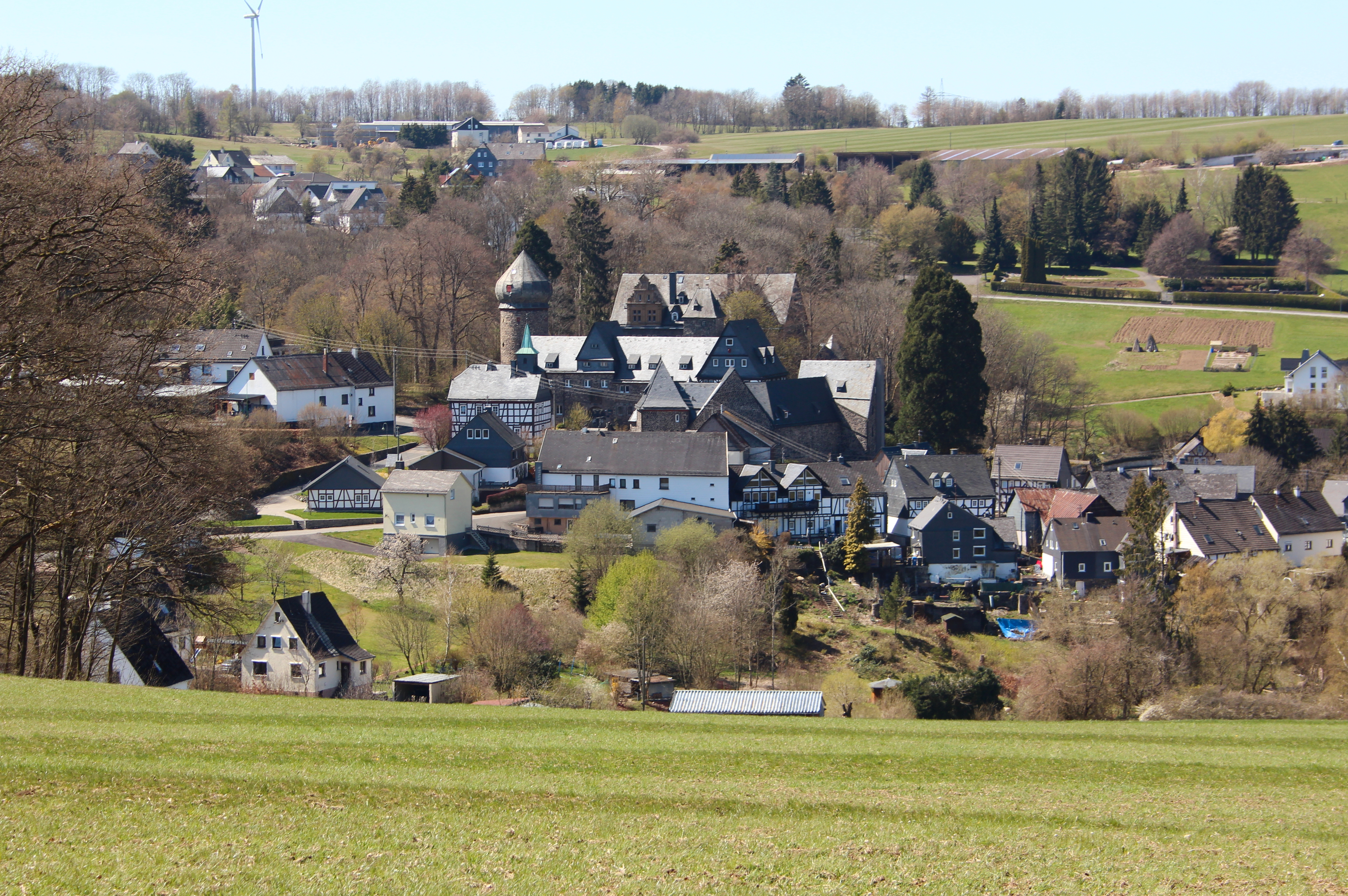

- Coat of arms

- Location of Friedewald within Altenkirchen district
- Interactive map of Friedewald
- Location within Germany Location within Rhineland-Palatinate
- Coordinates: 50°42′41″N 7°57′40″E
- Country: Germany
- State: Rhineland-Palatinate
- District: Altenkirchen
- Municipal assoc.: Daaden-Herdorf

Government
  - Mayor (2019–24): Karl-Heinz Buhl

Area
  - Total: 7.1 km^{2} (2.7 sq mi)
- Elevation: 440 m (1,440 ft)

Population (2025-12-31)
  - Total: 1,073
  - Density: 150/km^{2} (390/sq mi)
- Time zone: UTC+01:00 (CET)
  - Summer (DST): UTC+02:00 (CEST)
- Postal codes: 57520
- Dialling codes: 02743
- Vehicle registration: AK
- Website: www.friedewald-ww.de

Friedewald (German pronunciation: [ˈfʁiːdəvalt]) is a municipality in the district of Altenkirchen, in Rhineland-Palatinate, in western Germany.

== Transport ==
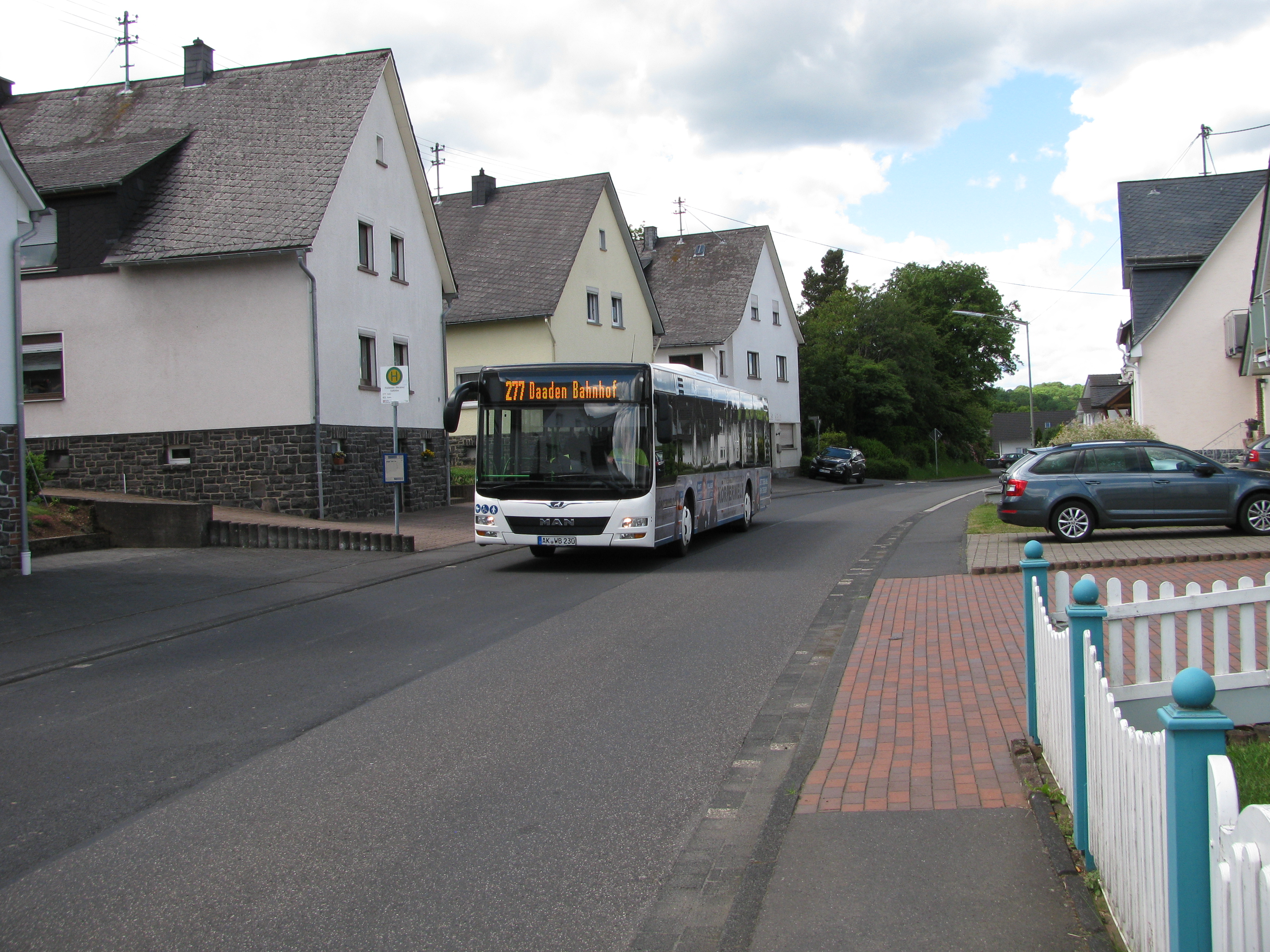
Local bus in Friedewald

Friedewald in the past had access to train service of the Westerwald railway, which is currently out of service.
