= Sayn-Altenkirchen =

German polity

County of Sayn-Wittgenstein-Sayn-Altenkirchen Grafschaft Sayn-Wittgenstein-Sayn-Altenkirchen
- 1648–1803
- Coat of arms

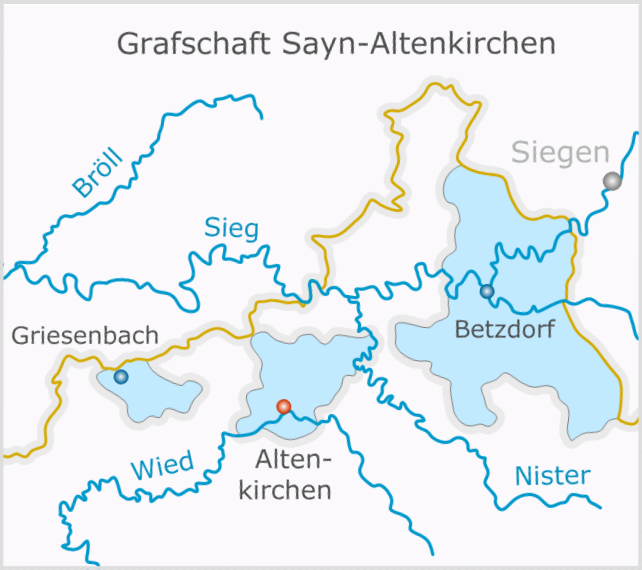
- Sayn-Altenkirchen as at 1803
- Status: State of the Holy Roman Empire
- Capital: Altenkirchen
- Government: Principality
- Historical era: Middle Ages
  - Death of William III of Sayn-Wittgenstein-Sayn: 1623
  - S-W-S partitioned to Sayn-Altkirchen and S-W-Hachenburg: 1648
  - Mediatised to Nassau-Weilburg: 1803
Preceded by	Succeeded by
Sayn-Wittgenstein-Sayn	Nassau-Weilburg

Sayn-Wittgenstein-Sayn-Altenkirchen (sometimes called Sayn-Altenkirchen) was a German county located in what is now Rhineland-Palatinate, near the river Sieg.

When Count William III of Sayn-Wittgenstein-Sayn died in 1623 without clear heirs, the Archbishop of Cologne occupied the vacant County until the succession was settled. It was settled by treaty in 1648, when the County was given jointly to Princesses Ernestine and Johanette, two sisters who were granddaughters of Count William, and their mother Dowager Countess Louise Juliane made regent. But shortly after the treaty, the County was split between the two. Ernestine's portion was called Sayn-Wittgenstein-Hachenburg (or Sayn-Hachenburg for short), a title which descended through the female line and is now a title of the Grand Duke of Luxembourg. Johanette's was Sayn-Wittgenstein-Sayn-Altenkirchen. Their mother remained regent for both Counties until 1652, when Johanette and Ernestine separately ruled their respective Counties. Sayn-Altenkirchen was inherited by Duke Johann William of Saxe-Eisenach — Johanette's son — and secondly by Duke William Henry of Saxe-Eisenach — Johanette's grandson. William Henry died childless and Sayn-Altenkirchen was inherited by Charles, Margrave of Brandenburg-Ansbach, Johanette's great-grandson.

The County of Sayn-Wittgenstein-Sayn-Altenkirchen ended when it was mediatised to Nassau-Weilburg in 1803.

Queen Caroline, wife of George II of Great Britain, was co-heiress to this County, but she never inherited it and her grandson George III was compensated for his loss of inheritance to it.

== Counts of Sayn-Wittgenstein-Sayn-Altenkirchen (1648–1803) ==
- Joan (1648–1701)
- William Henry (1701–41)
- Charles I William Frederick (1741–1757)
- Charles II Alexander (1757-1803)

Mediatised to Nassau-Weilburg 1803
