= County of Manderscheid =

County of the Holy Roman Empire

Coordinates: 50°6′N 6°49′E

County of Manderscheid Grafschaft Manderscheid (German)
- 10th century–1488
- Coat of arms

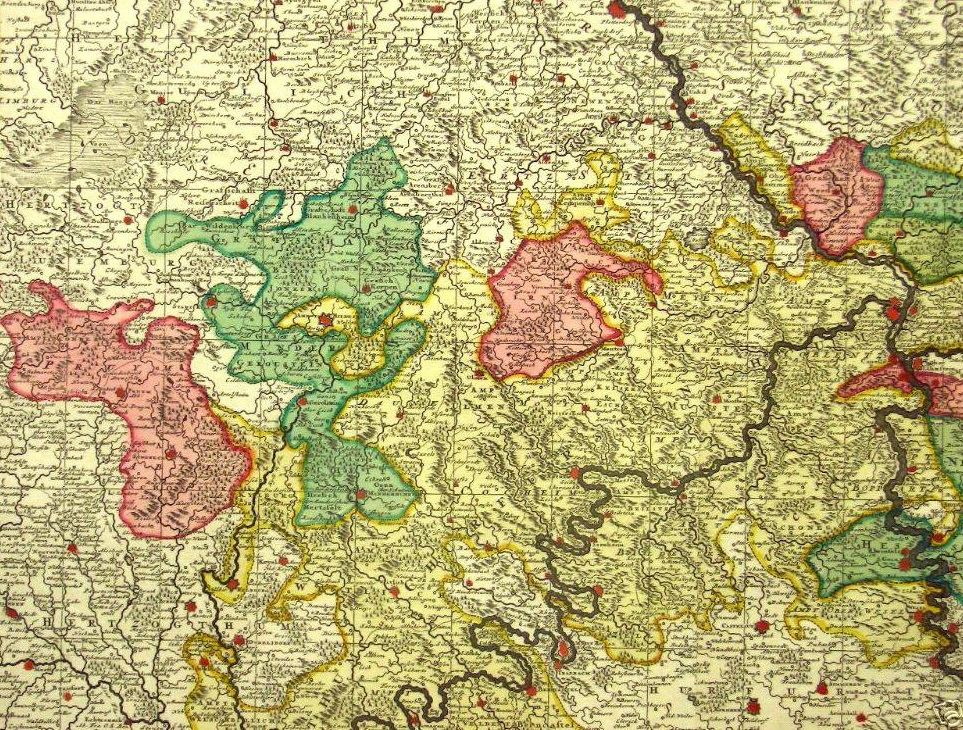
- County of Manderscheid (green) on a map from c. 1720
- Status: County
- Capital: Manderscheid
- Historical era: Middle Ages
  - Established: 10th century
  - Partitioned into three: 1488
Preceded by
West Francia
Succeeded by
County of Manderscheid-Schleiden
County of Manderscheid-Kail
County of Manderscheid-Blankenheim

The House of Manderscheid was the most powerful noble family in the Eifel region of Germany for a considerable period of time in the 15th century. In 1457, Dietrich III von Manderscheid was made a Reichsgraf (Imperial count) by the Emperor (probably Frederick III). When Dietrich died on 20 February 1498, he had appointed his sons Johann, Konrad and Wilhelm as new rulers – the family property had been distributed in 1488. Each of the sons founded a powerful lineage: Johann started the Manderscheid-Blankenheim-Gerolstein line, William the Manderscheid-Kail line, and Konrad (Cuno) the Manderscheid-Schleiden line. Augusta von Manderscheid-Blankenheim was the last countess. She was married to a member of the Bohemian nobility, Count Philipp Christian von Sternberg (1732–1811), whose issue became Counts of Sternberg-Manderscheid.

== Manderscheid-Kail lineage ==
The ancestral seat was the former moated castle in Oberkail, and because of this, Oberkail gained and maintained considerable importance in the Eifel region for several centuries. The moated palace is no longer standing – the last count of Oberkail died without descendants in 1762, the moated castle was destroyed and Oberkail returned to the status of a non-notable Eifel village.

== Witch-hunts and French takeover ==
The Eifel was underdeveloped and troubled by plagues, witch-hunts and feuds in the 17th century. Within the area of the Manderscheider counties, approximately 260 people were executed as witches between 1528 and 1641. In other regions of Germany, reformation and technical inventions had led to great progress.

In 1794, French revolutionary troops took control of the Rhine country and the Eifel region without great bloodshed and eliminated the aristocracy and the feudal system. Taxes such as socage duty, tithes and local customs duties were abolished. French became the official language, the judiciary system was updated and the economy in the Eifel experienced a boost.

== Archives ==
The originals of certificates and documents (such as deeds of ownership and commercial documents) that the family had taken with them on their flight to Bohemia are stored in the National Museum in Prague. After these documents were copied onto microfilm in the 1970s, a copy was stored in an archive in Brauweiler near Cologne. The documents are still awaiting a scientific evaluation.

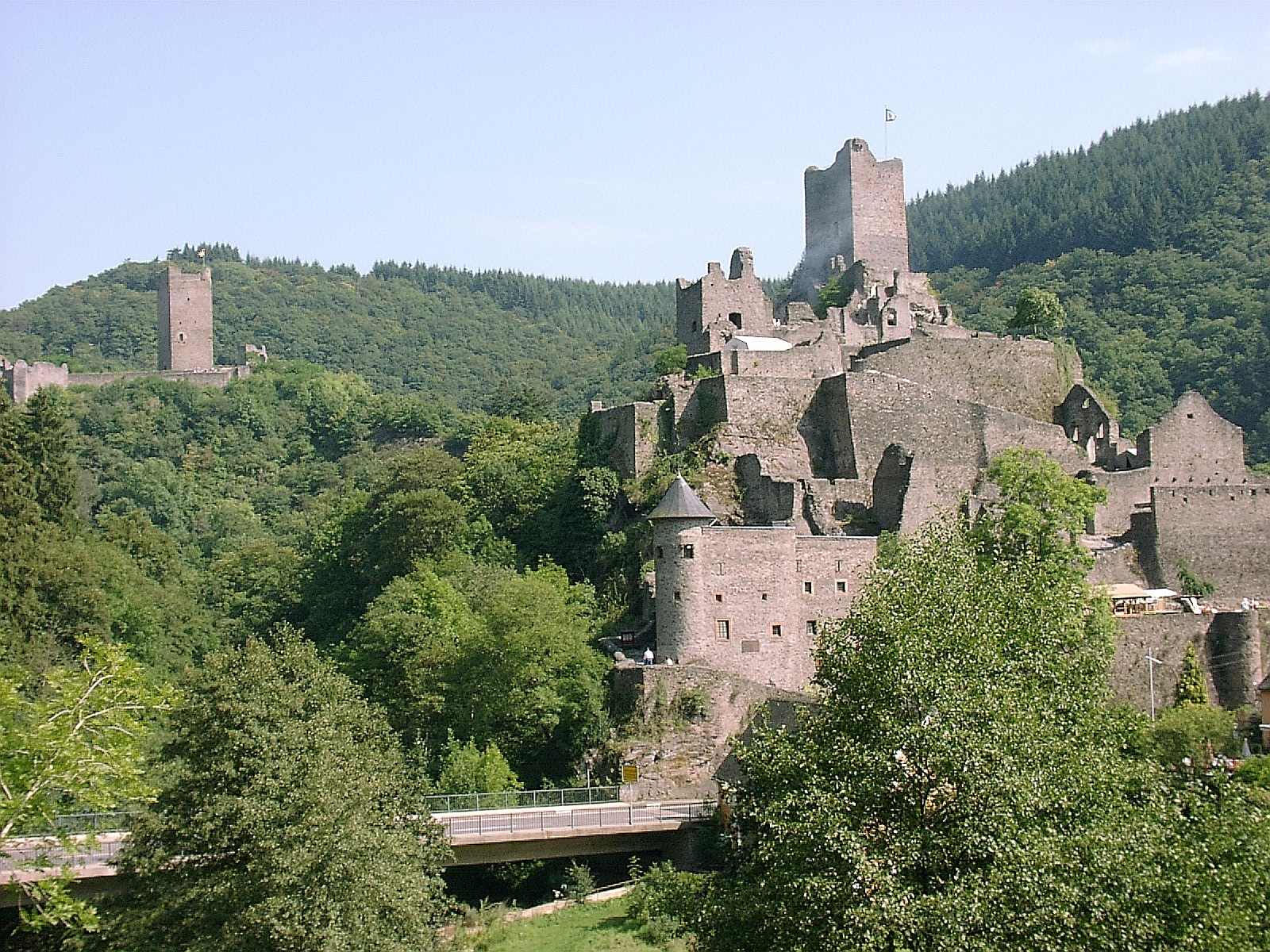
Lower castle at Manderscheid, with the ruin of the upper castle in the background
