= Sayn-Wittgenstein-Sayn =

County of Rhineland-Palatinate, Germany

County of Sayn-Wittgenstein-Sayn Grafschaft Sayn-Wittgenstein-Sayn
- Status: State of the Holy Roman Empire
- Capital: Sayn (in German)
- Government: Principality
- Historical era: Middle Ages
  - Partitioned from Sayn-Wittgenstein: 1607
  - Annexed by Archbishop of Cologne: → 1623
  - Succession resolved: partitioned in twain: 1648
Preceded by	Succeeded by
Sayn-Wittgenstein	Sayn-Wittgenstein-Sayn-Altenkirchen; Sayn-Wittgenstein-Hachenburg

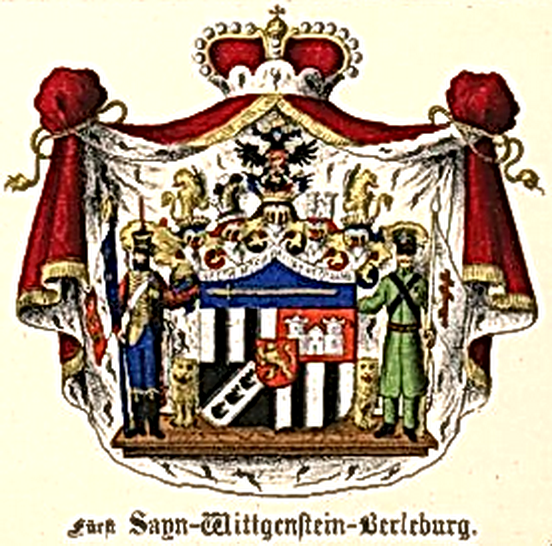
Coat of arms used by the Princes of Sayn-Wittgenstein-Sayn

Sayn-Wittgenstein-Sayn was a county of Rhineland-Palatinate, Germany, comprising the lands of the region of Sayn. It was created as a partition of Sayn-Wittgenstein in 1607, although it was not until the next year that it obtained fully the Countship of Sayn. The succession was never clear, leading to the annexation of the county in 1623 by the Archbishop of Cologne. It was not until a treaty in 1648 (at the end of the Thirty Years' War) that it was decided the county would pass to the sisters Ernestine and Johanette of Sayn-Wittgenstein-Sayn, under the regency of their mother, Countess Louise Juliane von Erbach (1603–1670). They partitioned the county into Sayn-Wittgenstein-Sayn-Altenkirchen and Sayn-Wittgenstein-Hachenburg soon after.

== Count of Sayn-Wittgenstein-Sayn, First Creation ==
- William III (ruled from 1607–1623), third son of Count Louis I; married Countess Anna Elizabeth of Sayn-Sayn (1572-1608), the niece and heiress of Henry IV, Count of Sayn-Sayn.

== Counts of Sayn-Wittgenstein-Sayn, Second Creation ==
Count William III's sons from his second marriage with Countess Anna Ottilie of Nassau-Weilburg (1582-1635) became Counts of Sayn-Wittgenstein-Sayn. The branch became extinct in 1846 with the death of Count Gustaf zu Sayn-Wittgenstein-Sayn (1811-1846).

== Princes of Sayn-Wittgenstein-Sayn ==
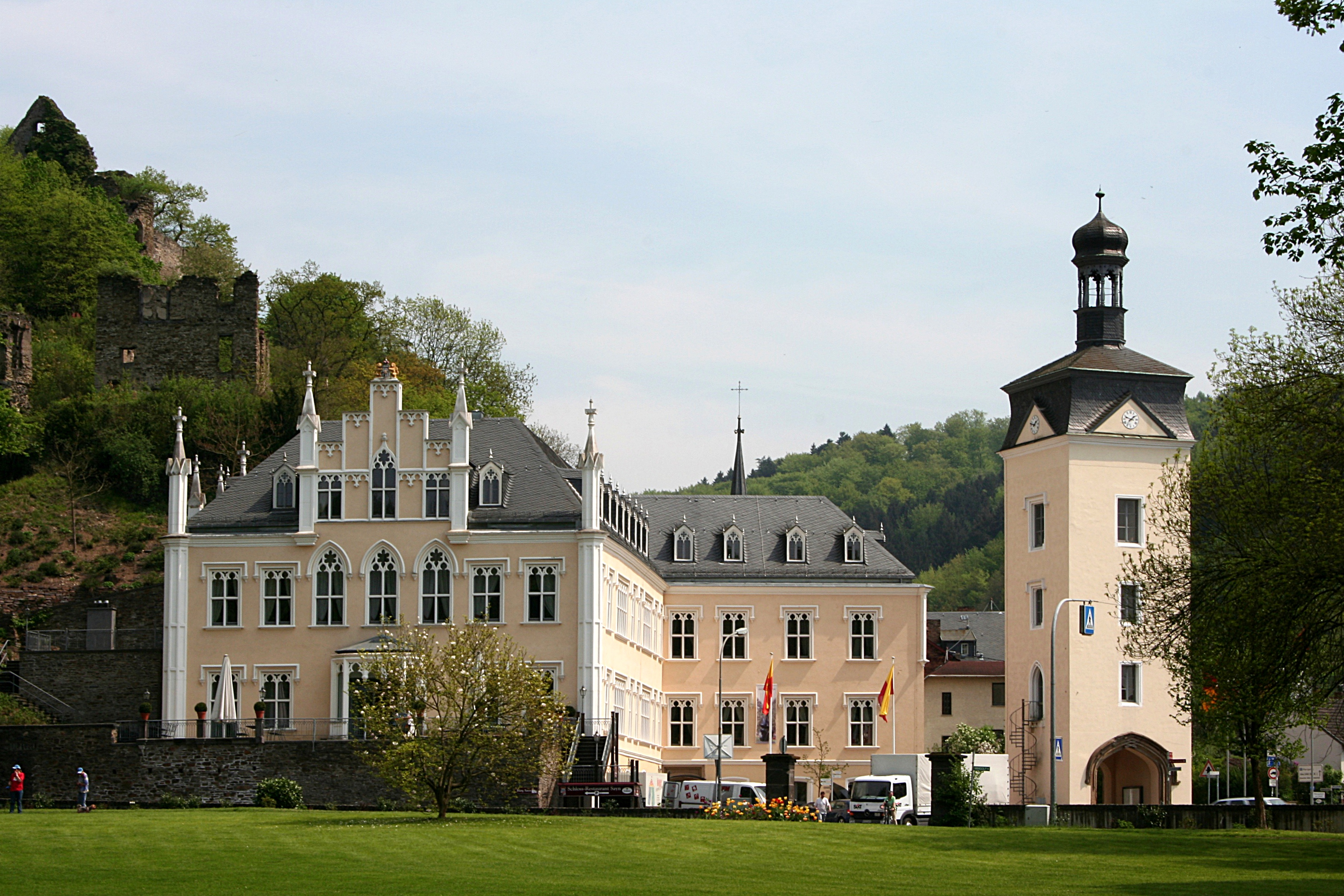
Ruins of an old fortress and the new Sayn palace in Bendorf, Mayen-Koblenz, Rhineland-Palatinate, Germany

Count Ludwig Franz II of Sayn-Wittgenstein-Berleburg-Ludwigsburg (1694–1750) founded a branch which in 1834 became Prussian Princes of Sayn-Wittgenstein-Berleburg-Ludwigsburg and in 1861 Princes of Sayn-Wittgenstein-Sayn. The present head of this branch is Alexander, Prince zu Sayn-Wittgenstein-Sayn (born 1943), the 7th prince.

== Line of succession ==
- Ludwig Franz II, 1st Count of Sayn-Wittgenstein-Berleburg-Ludwigsburg (1694–1750)
  - Christian Ludwig Casimir, 2nd Count of Sayn-Wittgenstein-Berleburg-Ludwigsburg (1725–1797)
    - Ludwig Adolf Peter, 1st Prince of Sayn-Wittgenstein-Berleburg-Ludwigsburg (Prussia) 1834 (1769–1843)
      - Ludwig Adolf Friedrich, succeeded to Prussian titles 1843, 1st Prince of Sayn-Wittgenstein-Sayn 1861–1866 (1799–1866)
        - Peter, succeeded to Prussian titles 1866 (1831–1887)
        - Friedrich, succeeded younger brother Ludwig as 3rd Prince 1876–1879, resigned in favor of younger brother Alexander, succeeded older brother in Prussian titles 1887 (1836–1909)
          - his descendants hold various Prussian and Russian titles
        - Ludwig, 2nd Prince 1866–1876 (1843–1876)
        - Alexander, 4th Prince 1879–1883, resigned in favor of his son (1847–1940)
          - Stanislaus, 5th Prince 1883–1958 (1872–1958)
          - Prince Gustav Alexander of Sayn-Wittgenstein-Sayn (1880–1953)
            - Ludwig Stanislaus, 6th Prince 1953–1962 (1915–1962)
              - Alexander, 7th Prince 1962–present (born 1943)
                - Heinrich, Hereditary Prince of Sayn-Wittgenstein-Sayn (born 1971)
                  - Prince Ludovico of Sayn-Wittgenstein-Sayn (born 2006)
                - Prince Casimir of Sayn-Wittgenstein-Sayn (born 1976)
                  - Prince Alexander of Sayn-Wittgenstein-Sayn (born 2002)
                  - Prince Johann of Sayn-Wittgenstein-Sayn (born 2020)
                  - Prince George of Sayn-Wittgenstein-Sayn (born 2023)
                - Prince Ludwig of Sayn-Wittgenstein-Sayn (born 1982)
                - Prince Peter of Sayn-Wittgenstein-Sayn (born 1992)
              - Prince Peter of Sayn-Wittgenstein-Sayn (born 1954)
                - Prince Constantin of Sayn-Wittgenstein-Sayn (born 1994)
            - Heinrich Prinz zu Sayn-Wittgenstein (1916–1944)
