= Marianne, Princess zu Sayn-Wittgenstein-Sayn =

German noblewoman, socialite and professional photographer (1919–2025)

Marianne
- Princess of Sayn-Wittgenstein-Sayn
- Born: Baroness Maria Anna von Mayr-Melnhof; 9 December 1919; Salzburg, Austria
- Died: 4 May 2025 (aged 105); Munich, Bavaria, Germany
- Spouse: Ludwig, 6th Prince of Sayn-Wittgenstein-Sayn (m. 1942; died 1962)
- Issue: Princess Yvonne, Edle von Kronstätt; Alexander, 7th Fürst of Sayn-Wittgenstein-Sayn; Princess Elisabeth, Baroness Schuler von Senden; Princess Teresa, Countess von Kageneck; Prince Peter zu Sayn-Wittgenstein-Sayn
- House: Sayn-Wittgenstein-Sayn (by marriage)
- Father: Baron Friedrich Adalbert von Mayr-Melnhof
- Mother: Countess Maria-Anna von Meran

Marianne, Princess of Sayn-Wittgenstein-Sayn, (born Baroness Maria Anna Mayr von Melnhof; 9 December 1919 – 4 May 2025) was a German noblewoman, socialite, a professional photographer, member of the House of Sayn-Wittgenstein-Sayn and the mother of Alexander, 7th Prince zu Sayn-Wittgenstein-Sayn (born 1943).

== Early life and ancestry ==
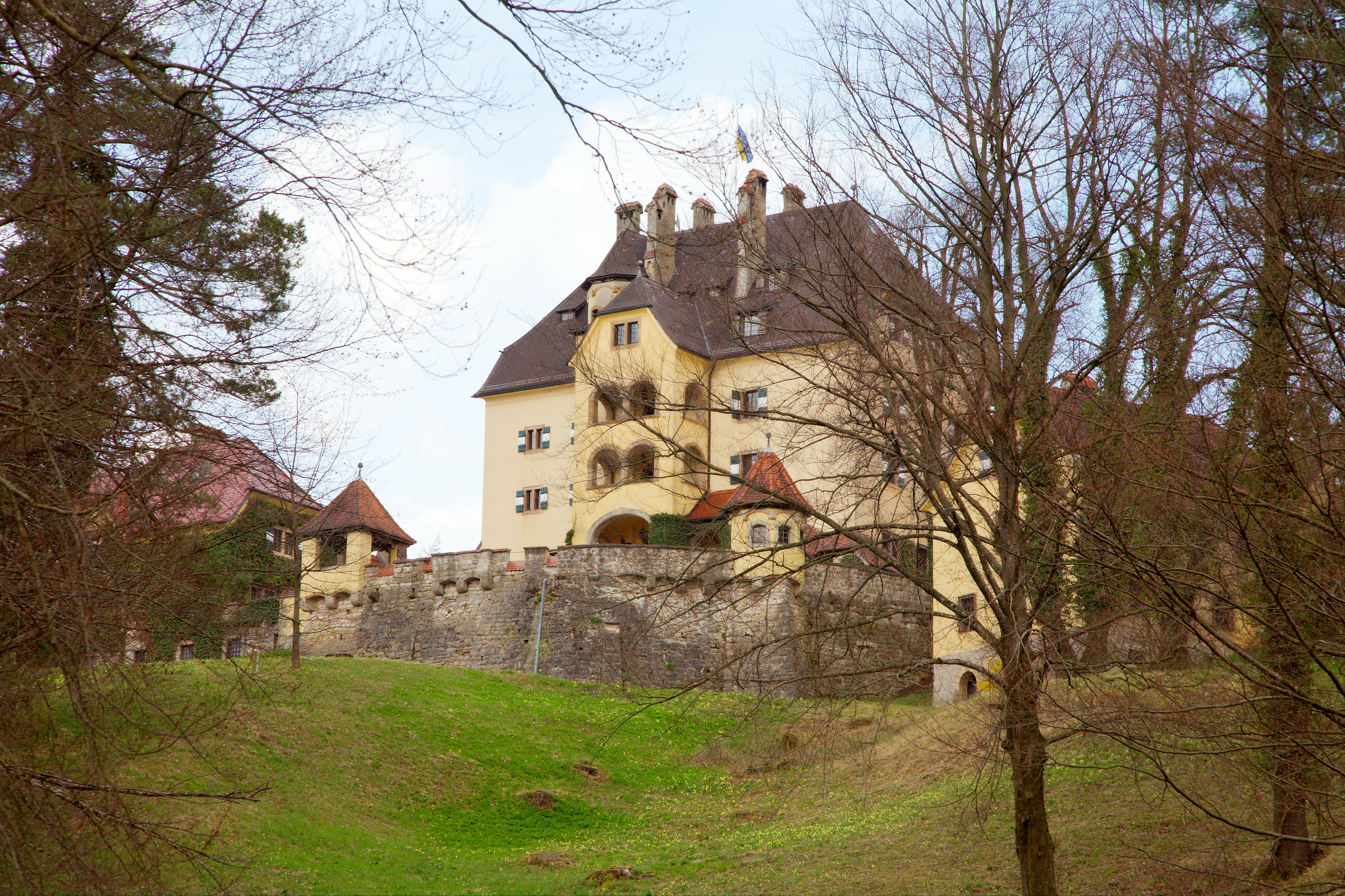
Glanegg castle, near Salzburg, where Marianne spent her childhood, was owned by her father Friedrich Adalbert Baron Mayr von Melnhof (1892–1956)

Maria Anna, commonly known as Marianne or simply Manni, was born on 9 December 1919 in Salzburg, the eldest of nine children of Baron Friedrich Adalbert Mayr von Melnhof (1892–1956), owner of the Glanegg Castle near Salzburg, and his wife, Countess Maria-Anna of Meran (1897–1983), granddaughter of Franz, Count of Meran, head of a morganatic branch of the imperial House of Habsburg-Lorraine. Through her mother Marianne is a direct descendant of Francis I, Holy Roman Emperor and his wife, Empress Maria Theresa. The Mayr von Melnhof family were Catholic Styrians since the 15th century and, having become industrialists, were ennobled in 1859 with the title of Edler von Melnhof. In 1872, they were granted the hereditary title of Baron in Austria by Franz Joseph I of Austria. Apart from Schloss Glanegg, Mayr von Melnhof family owned town palaces in Graz and Vienna, as well as several other castles across Austria, such as Kogl, Neu-Pfannberg, Jagdschloss Hochalm, which served as their country residencies.

== Career ==
She started a career as a professional photographer and archived about 300,000 of her photos until her 100th birthday in December 2019. She photographed celebrities from Maria Callas to Gianni Agnelli to Luciano Pavarotti and published travel reports.

She was given the name "Mamarazza" based on the word "paparazzo" as a nickname from Princess Caroline of Hanover, née Princess of Monaco, who once said to her: "Manni, you are a real Mamarazza." In contrast to paparazzi, she never took indiscreet or derogatory photos: "I always photographed my friends as friends."

== Marriage and children ==
Baroness Marianne married Ludwig, 6th Prince zu Sayn-Wittgenstein-Sayn on 12 March 1942 at Schloss Glanegg, who was born in 1915 and died accidentally at Sayn in 1962. They had five children:

- Princess Yvonne (born 9 December 1942) married firstly in 1962 (divorced in 1970) Alfons, Count von Coreth zu Coredo und Starkenberg (1930-2017), a photographer who served as honorary Thai consul in Salzburg, and married secondly in 1976 (divorced in 2008) a physician Klaus Bolzano, Edler von Kronstätt (1936-2025), and has issue from both marriages;
- Alexander, 7th Prince zu Sayn-Wittgenstein-Sayn (born 22 November 1943) married in 1969 Countess Gabriela von Schönborn-Wiesentheid (born 16 October 1950), an only daughter of Count Rudolf von Schönborn-Wiesentheid (1918–1998) by his first wife, Princess Helene von Thurn und Taxis (1924–1991). They have issue;
- Princess Elisabeth (1 April 1948 - 15 Apr 1997) married bank manager Hasso Eduard Georg Kurt Arthur, Baron Schuler von Senden (born 30 January 1943) in 1970, and they have issue;
- Princess Teresa (born 25 April 1952) married firstly in 1973 (divorced in 1983) Don Luis de Figueroa y Griffith, 12th Count of Quintanilla (born 5 February 1950), son of author Aline Griffith, Dowager Countess of Romanones, and married secondly in 1983 attorney Count Karl-Erbo von Kageneck (born in 1947), and has issue from both marriages;
- Prince Peter (born 22 January 1954) married in 1993 actress Sunnyi Melles (born 7 October 1958), the only daughter of Austrian orchestral conductor Carl Melles and his wife, Judith von Rohonczy (1929–2001). They have issue.

== Death ==
Princess Marianne zu Sayn-Wittgenstein-Sayn died at her home in Munich, Bavaria, on 4 May 2025, at the age of 105.

== Ancestry ==
Ancestors of Marianne, Princess zu Sayn-Wittgenstein-Sayn

8. Baron Franz Bartholomeus Mayr von Melnhof
4. Baron Franz Rudolf Mayr von Melnhof
9. Theodora Hittner, Edle von Hittnern
2. Baron Friedrich Mayr von Melnhof
10. Baron Karl Wilhelm von Tinti
5. Baroness Mathilde von Tinti
11. Baroness Mathilde von Lederer-Trattnern
1. Baroness Marianne von Mayr-Melnhof
12. Franz, Count von Meran
6. Johann, Count von Meran
13. Countess Theresia von Lamberg
3. Countess Maria-Anna von Meran
14. Count Philipp Karl von Lamberg
7. Countess Ladislaja von Lamberg
15. Baroness Marie von Wenckheim
