= Frank van Zanten =

Dutch businessman (born 1967)

- Born: Frank Andre van Zanten; 26 February 1967 (age 59)
- Education: Rotterdam School of Management
- Occupations: CEO, Bunzl
- Predecessor: Michael Roney
- Board member of: Bunzl; Grafton Group

Frank Andre van Zanten (born 26 February 1967) is a Dutch businessman, the CEO of Bunzl since April 2016.

== Early life ==
Frank Andre van Zanten was born on 26 February 1967. He has an MBA degree from the Rotterdam School of Management.

== Career ==
Van Zanten began his career in 1990 as a trainee and then as a product manager at Eli Lilly and Company. He left the following year to work for his family firm, HOPA Disposables, in Amsterdam before it was acquired by Bunzl in the mid 1990s. He went on to be CEO of PontMeyer, the Dutch builders merchants until 2005. van Zanten has worked for Bunzl since 2005, and has been the CEO since April 2016, and a non-executive director of the Grafton Group from May 2013 to April 2020.

== Personal life ==
Van Zanten is married and has a daughter. He lives in the Amsterdam area.
