= Andrew Nisbet =

British businessman

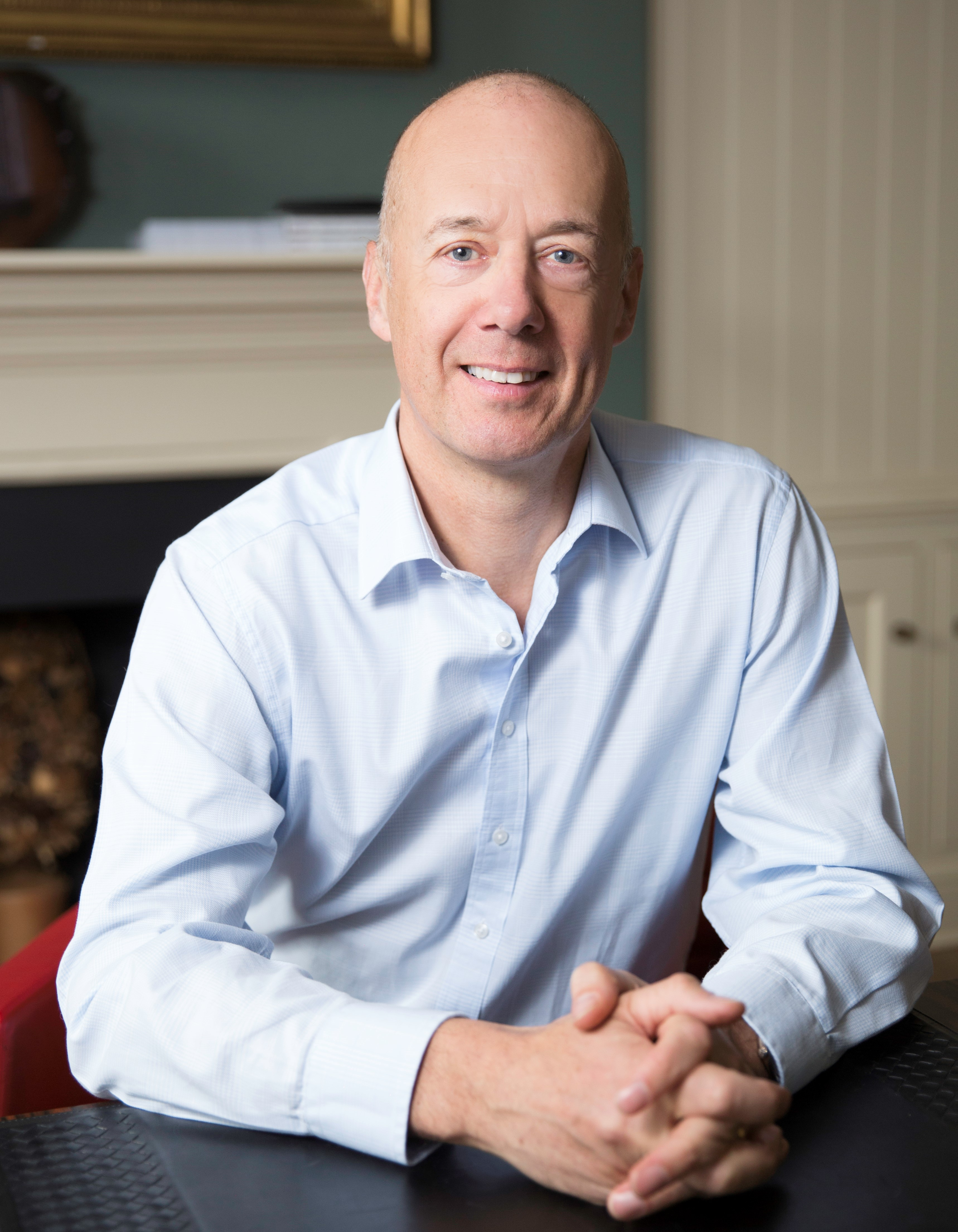
- Born: August 1960 (age 65); United Kingdom
- Occupation: Businessman
- Known for: Founder of Nisbets; Director of Key West Holdings; Founder and Trustee of The Nisbet Trust
- Spouse: Anne Nisbet
- Website: www.keywestholdings.co.uk

Andrew Nisbet (born August 1960) is a British businessman who is a Director of Key West Holdings, which holds his family's business interests and property. He is also founder of catering supplies retailer Nisbets.

Between 2012 and 2013, he was High Sheriff of Bristol.

== Early life ==
After leaving school in 1978, Nisbet joined his father's business, Peter Nisbet & Co. The business distributed catering equipment in South West England.

== Career ==
In 1983, Nisbet founded Nisbets, originally selling knives, catering clothing and textbooks to catering students. The business launched a mail-order catalogue in 1987 and moved into wholesale in 1990.

Between 1995 and 2017 the business expanded internationally. As of 2023, the majority of the company's sales were online.

In 2024, Nisbet sold an 80% stake in the business to Bunzl at a valuation of £500 million.

In 2014, Nisbet became a Director of Key West Holdings, which holds his family's business interests and property.

== Personal life ==
Andrew Nisbet lives in Bristol, UK with his wife Anne.

In 2011, the Nisbet family founded The Nisbet Trust, which provides grants to charitable organisations in the Greater Bristol area.

Between 2012 and 2013, Andrew Nisbet was High Sheriff of Bristol.
