= Rowlett Rutland =

- Formerly: Rowlett Catering Appliances
- Company type: Private company
- Industry: Kitchen appliances
- Founded: January 29, 1965
- Founder: Harold Edward (Ted) Rutland
- Defunct: 2016
- Fate: Acquired
- Successor: Nisbets
- Headquarters: Little Bookham, United Kingdom
- Products: Commercial toasters, catering products
- Owner: Nisbets
- Website: www.rowlett.co.uk Archived January 15, 2019, at the Wayback Machine

Rowlett Rutland was a British company that manufactured commercially oriented toasters and other catering products. It is now a brand owned by Nisbets. The company was not a high-volume operation, making around fifty toasters per day at its peak. It sold to approximately 20 countries, with 38% of products being exported.

== History ==
The first toasters were designed by Harold Edward (Ted) Rutland. It was known as Rowlett Catering Appliances Ltd, being incorporated on 29 January 1965. In January 2002, the company became known as Rowlett Rutland. The company was family-owned until 2016, being latterly owned and run by Ted's son Robert (Bob) Rutland.

Harold Edward Rutland died on 17 August 2004, aged 90.

The company had been in Twickenham from 1957, and previously was at Burnt Oak. In 2002, the company moved its headquartered to Little Bookham in Surrey, near Bookham railway station.

Rowlett hold the record for the World's Longest, Largest Fully Functional Toaster. It's 6ft Long and has 34 slots. It is currently displayed at the National Catering Equipment Centre in Bristol.

In 2016, the company was taken over, and the production was moved to Bristol in December 2017.

== Products ==
- Toasters and Conveyor toasters
- Hot Dog machines
- Hot plates
- Panini grills

== See also ==
- Blue Seal (company) of the West Midlands
- Classeq of Staffordshire
- Dualit of West Sussex
- Star Manufacturing of Smithville, Tennessee
