= Michael Roney =

American businessman (born 1954)

- Born: Michael James Roney; July 13, 1954 (age 72)
- Education: University of Michigan
- Occupation: Businessman
- Years active: 1981–
- Title: former CEO, Bunzl
- Term: 2005–2016
- Successor: Frank van Zanten
- Board member of: Brown-Forman Corporation, Azelis Group, Next plc, Grafton Group

Michael James Roney (born July 13, 1954) is an American businessman. He was the chief executive of Bunzl plc, a British multinational distribution and outsourcing company, from 2005 to 2016. He has been the chairman of Next plc and Grafton Group since 2017.

== Early life ==
Michael Roney was born on July 13, 1954. He was educated in Roman Catholic private schools in Detroit, Michigan. He graduated with an MBA from the Stephen M. Ross School of Business, University of Michigan in 1981.

== Career ==
Roney began his career as an accountant from 1978 to 1980. He worked for the Goodyear Tire and Rubber Company from 1981 to 2005.

Roney became a non-executive director of Bunzl in June 2003. In October 2005 he became CEO. He stood down as CEO in April 2016, and was succeeded by Frank van Zanten.

Roney was a non-executive director of Johnson Matthey plc from 2007 until 2014 and is a non-executive director of Brown-Forman Corporation.

In July 2016, Roney became a non-executive director of Azelis Group, the global speciality chemicals distributor. Roney has been the chairman of Next plc (succeeding John Barton) and Grafton Group since 2017.

== Personal life ==
Roney met his future wife in Argentina. They have four children, and reside in St John's Wood, London.
