= Reid Supply Company =

Global industrial parts supplier

- Company type: Subsidiary
- Industry: Industrial Supply
- Founded: 1948
- Headquarters: Muskegon, Michigan
- Parent: Essentra

Reid Supply Company is a global supplier of industrial parts based in Muskegon, Michigan. It has been one of the major employers in the Muskegon region since its founding in 1948. Reid Supply Company is known for serving industries like medical, alternative energy, oil and gas, engineering, aerospace, packaging, food processing, manufacturing, construction and government. As of December 31, 2013 Reid Supply Company was rebranded Essentra in accordance with their global rebranding.

== History ==
Reid Tool Supply started in 1948 by Mr. Liberty Reid. In about 4 years, Reid Tool Supply moved from Mr. Reid's house and into a newly constructed warehouse. By 2005, Reid Tool Supply was offering a wider range of industrial tools and parts, and changed its name to Reid Supply Company to reflect its expanded offerings. Reid Supply Company (global industrial parts distributor), United SignGraphics (signage, custom and large format printing), Reid Safety (outerwear, workwear, safety products), Total Quality Machining (machining services and customization of Reid Supply stock products) and Professional Parts Warehouse (snow plow parts and accessories) encompass the collection of Reid companies or Reid Entities. In August, 2014 it was announced that Filtrona PLC has purchased Reid Supply Company for $32 million USD.

== Catalog ==
Reid Supply Company's catalog started as a 16-page catalog which was sent to over 5,000 machine shops. Today, the catalog is more than 850 pages.

== Philanthropy ==
Reid Supply Company was amongst the first in the Muskegon area to take a proactive approach on banning smoking in the work place. Reid Entities (the collection of Reid companies) also has a policy of rewarding employees that participate in blood drives.

== Government relations ==
Reid Supply Company has dealt with the government on a regular basis. As a GSA contact holder and small business, Reid Supply Company has been awarded several federal and state contracts.
