= Essentra Packaging =

- Type: Trading Division of Essentra plc
- Industry: Packaging
- Predecessor: Payne, PP Payne, Contego, Dakota Packaging
- Founded: Nottingham, United Kingdom (1911)
- Founder: Percy Philip Payne
- Headquarters: Nottingham, United Kingdom
- Products: Consumer Packaging, Healthcare Packaging
- Revenue: £181.8 million (2013)
- Operating income: £30.2 million (2013)
- Parent: Independent (until 1996); Bunzl (1996–2005); Essentra plc (2005–22); Mayr-Melnhof (2022–present)
- Website: essentrapackaging.com

Essentra Packaging is a multinational manufacturer of pressure-sensitive tear tape, labels, closures and seals for the packaging and labeling industry. Until October 2022, it was part of the Packaging & Securing Solutions division of Essentra. Since then, it has been part of Mayr-Melnhof's Packaging division.

== History ==
P. P. Payne was founded in 1911 by Percy Philip Payne, manufacturing cotton tapes for the local textile industry. In the 1950s, the business developed Rippatape, the first tear tape based on cotton fibres, used for easy opening of boxes and sacks. By 1962, the main company was P. P. Payne & Sons Limited, of Nottingham, “makers of Regal gift wrappings, ribbons, cards, and industrial tapes”. In 1969, the company had subsidiaries called Elegant Stationery Co. Limited and Regal Stationery Limited. It went on to develop self-adhesive tear tapes, which became popular for cigarette packaging, and was acquired by Bunzl in 1996 as a consequence of the group's growing success in filter production. PP Payne was demerged from Bunzl in 2005 and formed part of the Filtrona group, where it was renamed to Payne. In 2010, the company expanded its product portfolio through the acquisition of Cardiff-based BP Labels. In early 2013, Filtrona plc completed the acquisition of Contego Healthcare, which was incorporated into the Coated & Security Products Division of the company.

On 26 June 2013, the parent company, Filtrona PLC formally rebranded to Essentra Plc. As part of this, Payne re-branded to Essentra Packaging on October 14. The company's Coated & Security Products Division in which Payne operated was renamed Essentra Packaging & Securing Solutions.

In November 2013, the company acquired Dakota Packaging, based in Dublin, Ireland, to reinforce the division's product range and customer base in healthcare packaging. It also provides significant additional scale in the Irish market.

In November 2014, the company announced the acquisition of a healthcare carton and labelling company, Clondalkin, for $455m in order to grow its North American business.

== Locations ==
Essentra Packaging is headquartered in Giltbrook, Nottingham and has additional manufacturing facilities in Banbury, Cardiff, Liverpool, Bradford, Newmarket, Fareham, Waterford, Sarreguemines, Bitterfeld-Wolfen, Cervia, Podenzano, County Cork, Richmond, São Paulo, Bangalore and Surabaya, along with offices in Singapore and China from which Essentra Packaging provides its products to customers in over 100 countries.

== Products ==
Essentra Packaging manufactures a range of tear tapes, labels, closures and seals which claim to offer functional aspects to packaged goods. The products can also act as a medium to carry branding and messages, in the form of printed images, text or data. Additionally, these products can also carry brand protection solutions, such as tamper evidence or a range of overt and covert authentication technologies such as holography, colour shift inks and taggants.

The healthcare packaging area of the business manufactures and prints cartons, labels, leaflets, and blister pack foils for use in the healthcare and pharmaceutical industries.

== Awards and nominations ==
Essentra Packaging won an Asian Manufacturing Award in 2012 in the Innovation Solution Category for their Variable Data Print tear tape, which combined digital print technology and gravure printing to deliver over 500 million unique digitally printed codes together with a promotional message. The in-house design department of Essentra Packaging was named Design Team of the Year at the 2013 UK Packaging Awards and was one of four firms shortlisted in the Packaging Company of the Year category.
