= Essentra =

British company

- Type: Public
- Traded as: LSE: ESNT
- Industry: Plastic products
- Founded: 1940s
- Headquarters: Kidlington, Oxfordshire, UK
- Key people: Steve Good, Chairman; Scott Fawcett, CEO
- Revenue: ▼£302.0 million (2025)
- Operating income: ▼£8.5 million (2025)
- Net income: ▼£2.1 million (2025)
- Website: www.essentra.com

Essentra PLC is a supplier of plastic and fibre products. The company operates internationally from headquarters in Kidlington, Oxfordshire. It is listed on the London Stock Exchange.

== History ==
The company was established in Jarrow in the 1940s as the Fibres division of Bunzl. In 1955 it acquired Moss Plastics, a plastic products manufacturer, in 1994 MSI Oilfield Products, a pipe protection business, and in 1996 it bought Payne, a manufacturer of tear tapes.

In 1997 the Bunzl Fibres division bought Filtrona Corporation, a US filter technology specialist which it had demerged in 1984. At this time the Filtrona name was adopted for the enlarged Bunzl Fibres business. The company bought Enitor, a Dutch extruder business, in 1998 and Skiffy Group, a Dutch nylon parts business in 2004.

The company was demerged from Bunzl in 2005. It went on to buy Duraco, a US adhesive coated products business in 2007. In 2008, the company purchased Lendell Manufacturing, a foam manufacturer. The foam and fiber businesses were combined into a new division and named Filtrona Porous Technologies.

On 26 June 2013, the company formally rebranded to Essentra plc. Then-Chief Executive, Colin Day said that the company chose the name Essentra “to capture what each of Filtrona’s businesses manufacture and supply: small but essential key components that play critical roles for our customers”. On 31 October 2016, Essentra announced that Paul Forman would succeed Day as Chief executive, effective 1 January 2017.

== Operations ==
The company is organised as follows:

- Components Solutions
- Specialist Components
