= Plumbworld =

- Company type: Private
- Industry: Retailer
- Founded: 1999 (Evesham)
- Founder: James and Anita Hickman
- Headquarters: Evesham, England, UK
- Key people: James Hickman (CEO)
- Products: Bathroom
- Revenue: £61 Million (2020)
- Number of employees: 128 (2020)
- Website: www.plumbworld.co.uk

Plumbworld is a specialist bathroom retailer based in the market town of Evesham in the United Kingdom. The company was founded by the current CEO James Hickman in 1999 and operates exclusively online. It was owned by the Grafton Group between 2006 and 2019, now back under the control of the original founder after a management buyout.

== History ==
Plumbworld was founded in 1999 by James and Anita Hickman. The company grew into a multi-million pound business within a matter of years. In 2006, James Hickman sold the company to the UK and Irish based company Grafton Group.

== Current ==
In January 2019 a team led by the founder of the business James Hickman bought back the company from Grafton Group plc.

== Awards ==
The company has been recognised nationwide and has claimed various awards over the years including the prestigious 'Top Ten Website' by Hitwise., The eBay "Little to Large Award" in 2020 and was also shortlisted for the Fastrack 100 ones to watch that year.

== Charitable Activities ==
The business has been involved in numerous charitable activities since being founded in 1999 and continues to raise money. Over the years Plumbworld have been involved in raising money for Sport Relief, Evesham's historic Regal Cinema relaunch, and various nationwide community projects. Plumbworld joined forces with The Heart of England Forest Project in order to plant more than one million trees. The ongoing partnership saw 9.11 hectares being used to plant nearly 10,000 trees and the same again the following year. The company have always taken responsibilities to the environment seriously and continues to support this important project.
