= Huws Gray =

Welsh builders merchant

Huws Gray Ltd
- Industry: Builders Merchant
- Founded: 1990; 36 years ago Gaerwen, Wales
- Headquarters: Llangefni, Wales
- Number of locations: 330+ (2025)
- Area served: Great Britain
- Key people: Daksh Gupta, Terry Owen, Dewi Morris, Adrian Wallington, Shaun Allen, Rachel Wheeler, Steve Jones, Andy Wagstaff, Jon White
- Products: Building and home improvement materials
- Number of employees: 4,700+ (2025)
- Website: www.huwsgray.co.uk

Huws Gray is a Welsh building materials and solutions supplier, headquartered in Llangefni, Wales, with over 330 branches across England, Wales, and Scotland.

== History ==
Huws Gray was founded in 1990 in Gaerwen, Anglesey, Wales, starting with just one branch and four employees. Over the years, the company expanded rapidly through organic growth and strategic acquisitions.

A key milestone came in October 2018, when Huws Gray acquired Ridgeons Ltd, a respected merchant with over 40 branches across East Anglia. This move significantly extended Huws Gray’s reach into the southeast of England.

In April 2018, the company secured a minority investment from Inflexion Private Equity, which supported its growth ambitions and helped double its headcount and profits over the following years.

In June 2021, Blackstone Inc. acquired a stake in Huws Gray from Inflexion, valuing the business at around £1 billion. This investment coincided with Huws Gray’s largest acquisition to date: the £520 million purchase of Grafton Group’s merchanting businesses in Great Britain, including Buildbase, Civils & Lintels, PDM Buildbase, The Timber Group, and Bathroom Distribution Group.

These strategic moves have helped Huws Gray Group grow to over 330 branches across England, Wales, and Scotland, solidifying its position as a leader in the building materials sector.

== Operations ==
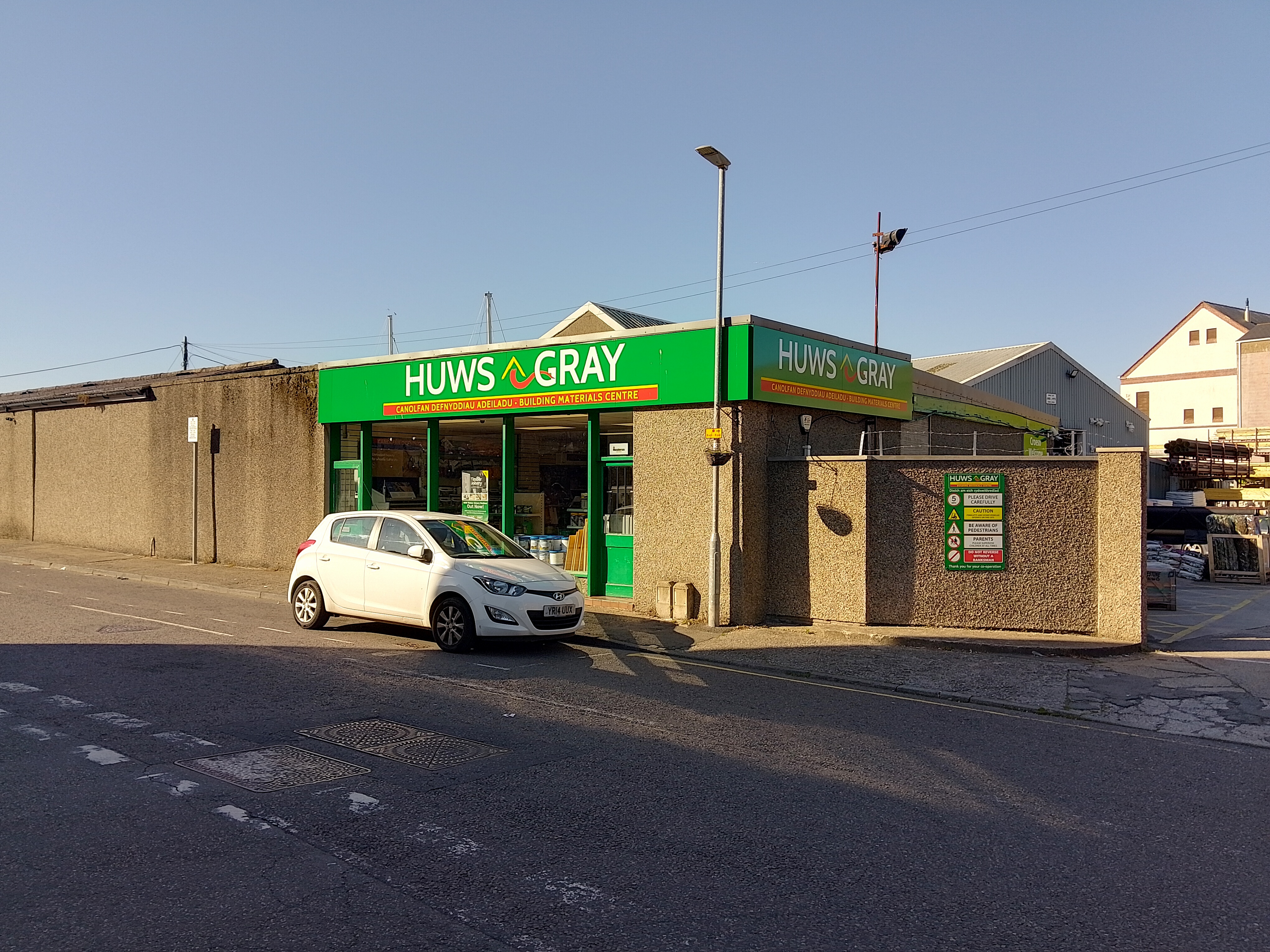
A branch of Huws Gray in Caernarfon

Huws Gray product range includes building materials, plant and tool hire, power tools, doors, windows, kitchens, bathrooms, plumbing and heating supplies, and bespoke manufactured lintels and roof trusses. They also distribute lintels, drainage, civils materials and insulation, as well as imported timber. They serve both trade and corporate customers.

== Sponsorship ==
Huws Gray has a history of supporting football at both regional and national levels. The company previously sponsored the Cymru Alliance, the second tier of Welsh football in north and mid-Wales, which was renamed the Huws Gray Alliance during the sponsorship period. In 2019, Huws Gray was also the principal sponsor of the Inter Games Football Tournament, held on Anglesey and featuring teams from the Island Games.

In 2025, Huws Gray became the official kit sponsor of Professional Game Match Officials Limited (PGMOL) for the 2025–26 football season. The sponsorship includes branding on matchday and training kits worn by referees, assistant referees, and VAR officials across major competitions such as the Premier League, EFL Championship, FA Cup, League Cup, National League, and the Women’s Super League. The partnership provides national exposure for the Huws Gray brand and aligns with its broader support for professionalism and teamwork within the industry.
