= Skin pack =

Type of carded packaging

Skin pack, or skin packaging, is a type of carded packaging where a product (or products) is placed on a piece of paperboard or in trays, and a thin sheet of transparent plastic is placed over the product and paperboard or trays. The printed paperboard/tray usually has a heat-seal coating. The plastic film (LDPE, ionomer, etc.) is softened by heat and draped over the product on the card/tray. Vacuum is used to assist a firm fit. The film bonds to the heat-seal coating on the paperboard.

The substrate can be either made specifically for skin packaging, or converted from other paper stock, such as corrugated board. The specially made sheets Solid Bleached Sulfate (SBS) are porous, and allow the vacuum to flow directly through the paper. Most other stocks need to have the sheet perforated with pinholes to allow airflow.

The skin-packed piece may then need to be cut into individual units. Cuts such as keyslots, round corners and internal die cuts may be added during the cutting process once the skin pack is secured tightly.

Self-adhesive film with an uncoated card is also sometimes used.

Skin packaging somewhat resembles a blister pack, with the major difference being that the plastic surrounding the product is formed over the product instead of being pre-formed.

Types of plastic film:

- Polyethylene
- Ionomer
- PET

== Meat ==
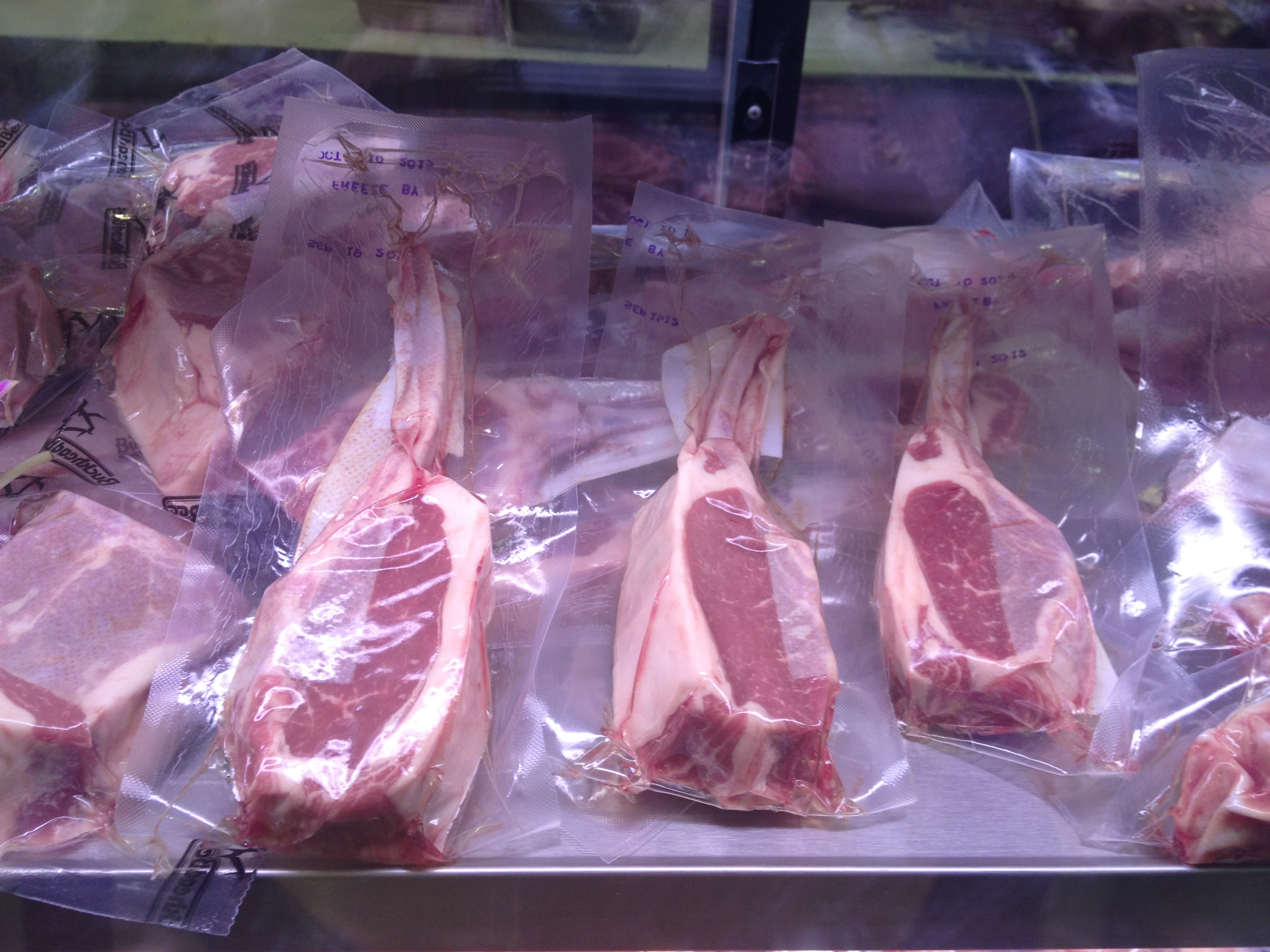
Vacuum- and skin-packed meat

Fresh meat can be vacuum-packed and skin-packed. Specialized packaging operations are needed to maintain product appearance and safety. Temperature control during the cold chain is needed for proper shelf life.
