= Wrap rage =

Intense anger on failing to open packaging

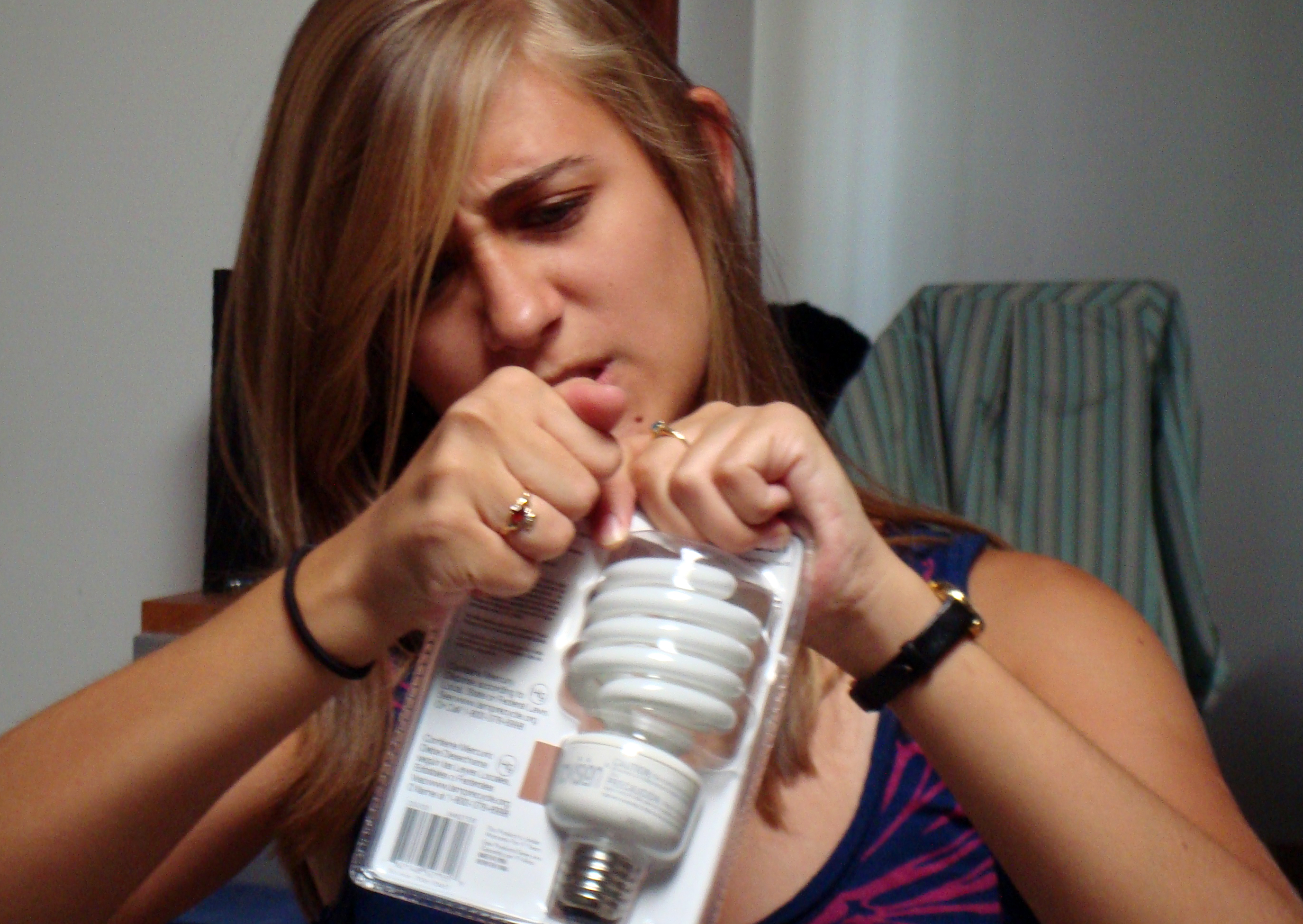
A woman exhibiting wrap rage with a plastic light bulb package.

Wrap rage, also called package rage, is the common name for heightened levels of anger and frustration resulting from the inability to open packaging, particularly some heat-sealed plastic blister packs and clamshells. People can be injured while opening difficult packaging: cutting tools pose a sharp hazard to the person opening the package, as well as to its contents.

== Background ==
Packaging sometimes must be made difficult to open. For example, regulations dictate that some over-the-counter drugs have tamper resistance to deter unauthorized opening before delivery to the intended customer and be in child-resistant packaging. Other packages are intentionally made difficult to open to reduce package pilferage and shoplifting.

Hard plastic blister packs also protect the products while they are being shipped. In addition, using transparent plastic allows customers to view products directly before purchasing them.

The term wrap rage itself came about as a result of media attention to the phenomenon. Although other variants such as packaging rage have been used as early as 1998, Word Spy identifies the earliest use of wrap rage as coming from The Daily Telegraph in 2003. The American Dialect Society identified the term as one of the most useful of 2007.

== Frustration and injuries ==
In 2006, Consumer Reports magazine recognized the wrap rage phenomenon when it created the Oyster Awards for the products with the hardest-to-open packaging. A story in the Pittsburgh Post-Gazette about wrap rage was featured on The Colbert Report when host Stephen Colbert tried to use a knife to remove a new calculator from its plastic packaging, to no avail.

A 2004 survey in Yours, a British magazine aimed at people over 50, found that 99% of the 2,000 respondents said packaging had become harder to open over the last 10 years, 97% said there was "too much excess packaging", and 60% said they had bought a product designed with more easily opened packaging. In a survey conducted at the Cox School of Business, almost 80 percent of households "expressed anger, frustration or outright rage" with plastic packaging. Consumers also tend to use words such as "hate" and "difficult" when describing these products.

Consumers sometimes use potentially unsafe tools such as razor blades, boxcutters, snips and ice picks in their attempts to open packages. This can also result in the packaging itself becoming sharp. In the Yours survey, 71% of respondents said they had been injured while trying to open food packaging. The most common injury respondents had from trying to open packaging was "a cut finger, followed by a cut hand, sprained wrist, bruised hand and strained shoulder muscle." According to a British study, over 60,000 people receive hospital treatment each year due to injuries from opening food packaging. The Consumer Product Safety Commission estimated that attempts to open packaging caused about 6,500 emergency department visits in the U.S. in 2004. A 2009 study conducted by the Institute for Good Medicine found that 17 percent of adults over the age of 21 were either injured at least once or know of someone who was injured while opening a holiday or birthday gift.

== Solutions ==
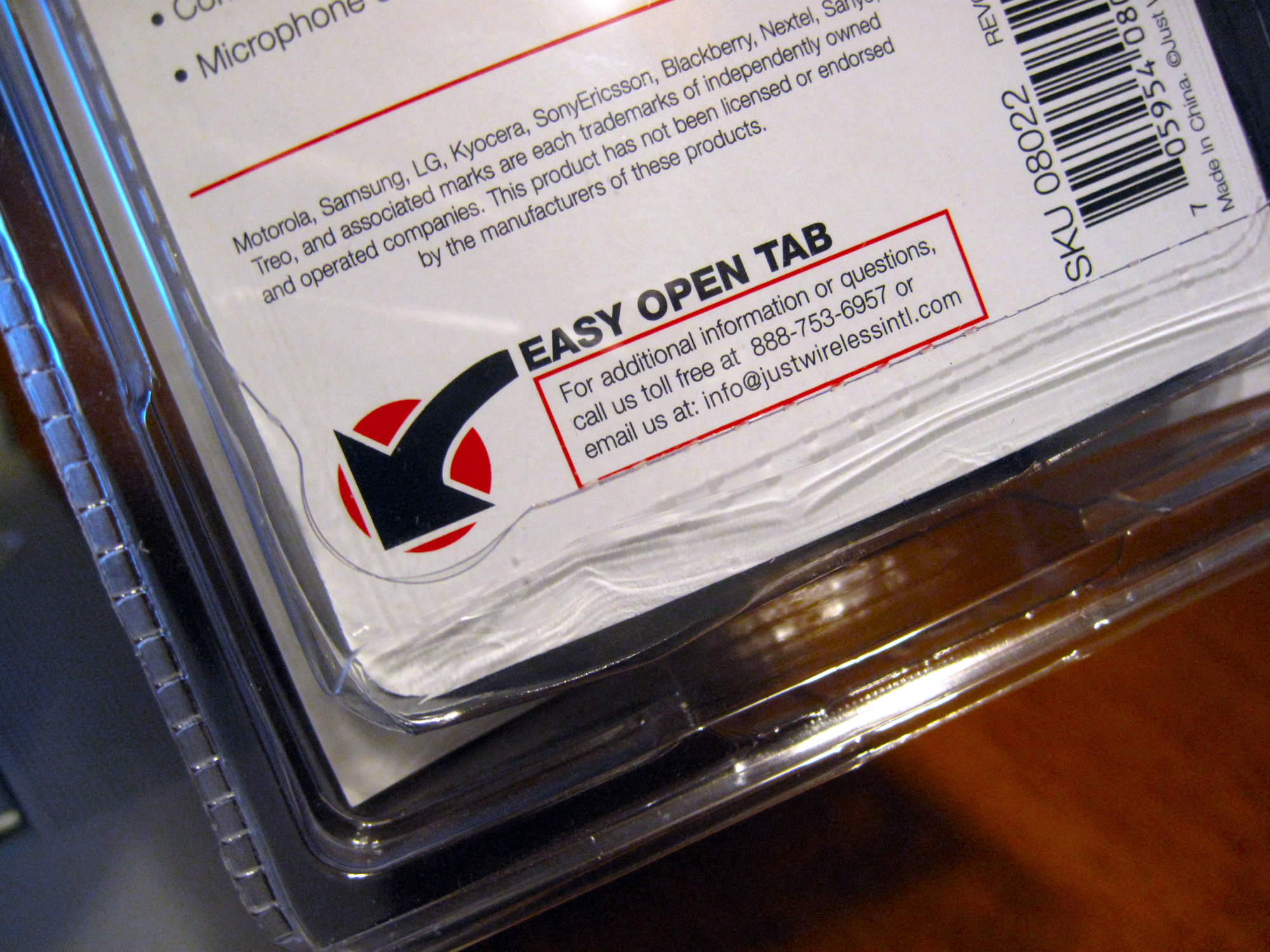
Packages featuring innovations such as easy-open tabs have been made partially in response to customer difficulties with standard clamshell packaging.

=== Packaging design ===
When packagers and retailers are willing, there are many possible solutions to allow easy access to package contents. Easy access, however, can also allow more pilferage and shoplifting.

Some companies are making their packs easier for consumers to open to help reduce frustration. Other companies must keep tamper resistant packages. Forces driving the efforts to improve packaging include pressure from consumers, retailers, and senior citizens who find it increasingly difficult to open packaging as they age.

Several methods of making packages easy to open have long been available. These include perforations, "tear tapes" and break-open components. Some easy-open features can add extra cost to packaging.

=== Opening ===
Household scissors or a utility knife are sometimes used to open difficult packaging. Tin snips are effective for tough plastics; the higher mechanical advantage of compound metal snips make it possible to cut such packages open with little hand strength. Trauma shears are also effective for opening packaging of this type.

== See also ==
- Air rage
- Bike rage
- Computer rage
- Road rage
- Packaging waste
- Tamper resistance
