= Mayr-Melnhof =

Austrian paper and packaging company

Mayr-Melnhof Karton AG
- Type: Aktiengesellschaft
- Traded as: WBAG: MMK
- ISIN: AT0000938204
- Industry: Paper and packaging
- Founded: 1950
- Headquarters: Vienna, Austria
- Key people: Peter Oswald (CEO), Wolfgang Eder (Chairman of the supervisory board)
- Products: Paperboard, cartons
- Revenue: €2 billion (2020)
- Operating income: €231.4 million (2020)
- Net income: €162.2 million (2020)
- Total assets: €2,399.6 million (end 2020)
- Total equity: €1,547.1 million (end 2020)
- Number of employees: 13,593 (end 2025)
- Website: www.mm.group

Mayr-Melnhof Karton AG (MM Group) is a manufacturer in the paper and packaging industry, based in Vienna, Austria. The company is 65% family owned, with the rest free-float, and is listed on the Vienna Stock Exchange (Wiener Börse).

The Group operates through three business divisions:

- MM Board & Paper
- MM Food & Premium Packaging
- MM Pharma & Healthcare Packaging

Mayr-Melnhof packaging is a multi-national company with plants in Austria, Chile, Germany, France, the United Kingdom, Iran, Jordan, the Netherlands, Poland, Romania, Slovenia, Spain, Turkey, Tunisia, Ukraine, and Vietnam.

== History ==
=== Origins ===
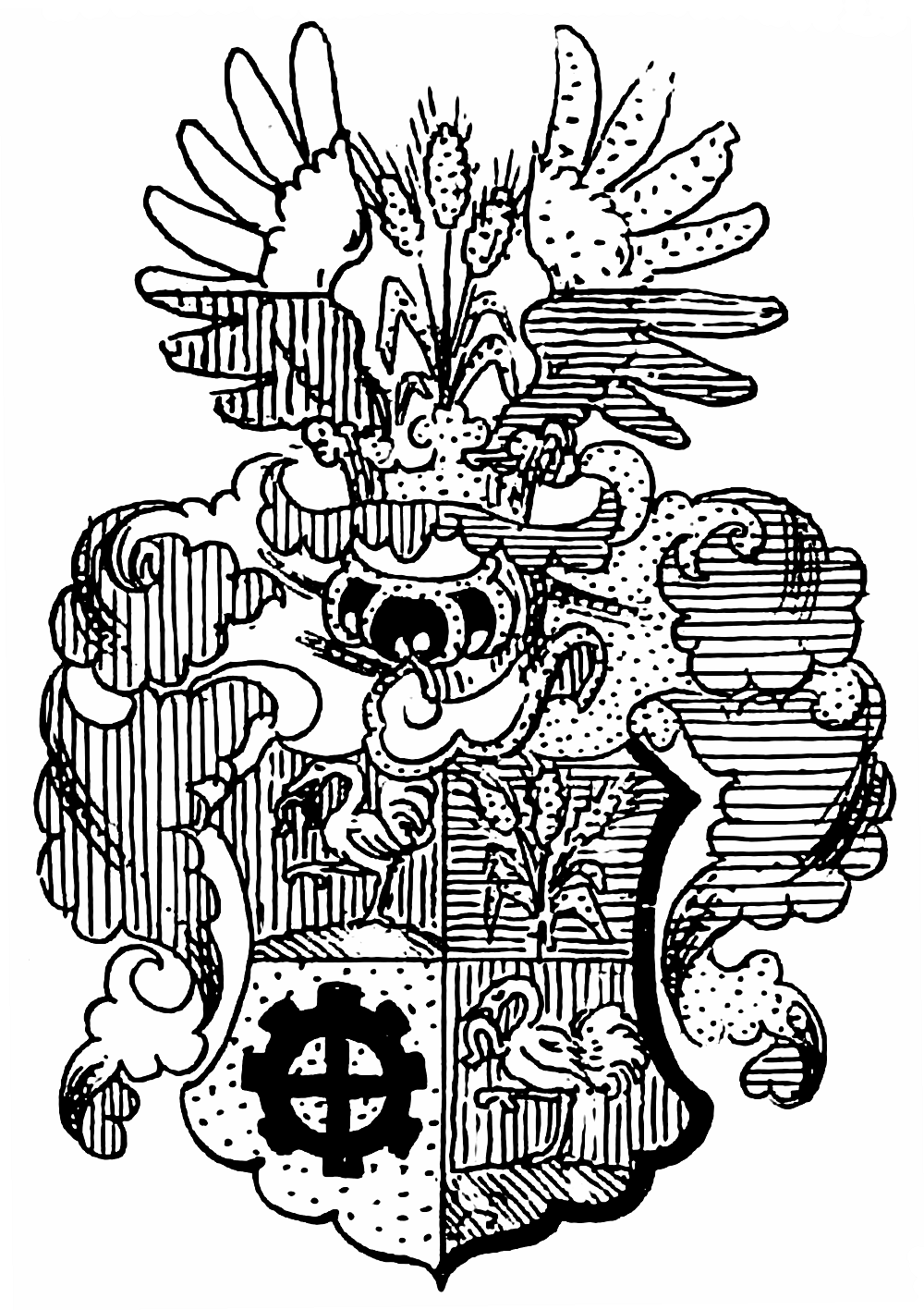
Coat of arms of Mayr von Melnhof family (1904)

The Mayr-Melnhof family hailed from Spielberg, Styria and was first mentioned in a written document from 1423. Industry owner, Franz Mayr (1810–1889) was ennobled in 1859 with the title "Edler of Melnhof". Since then the family was styled Mayr von Melnhof.

In 1872 Franz Mayr, Edler von Melnhof, received the hereditary title of Baron in Austria for him and his legitimate male-line descendants, by Franz Joseph I.

The family owned town palaces in Graz and Vienna, as well as several other castles across Austria, such as Glanegg, Kogl, Neu-Pfannberg, Jagdschloss Hochalm, which served as their country residencies.

The most notable member of the family was Marianne, Princess of Sayn-Wittgenstein-Sayn, a German noblewoman, socialite and a professional photographer.

=== 1950 to 1990s ===
Industrial production of cardboard began in 1950, when the first cardboard machine was installed at the main mill in Frohnleiten, Styria, marking the start of large-scale manufacturing. Over the following decades, the company steadily expanded its operations and influence in the packaging industry. In 1994, the Mayr-Melnhof Group took a significant step in its corporate development by transforming into a stock corporation and securing a listing on the Vienna Stock Exchange. The initial public offering was set at a price of ATS 500 per share, equivalent to roughly EUR 35, symbolizing the company's growing presence in the European market.

=== Early 2000s ===
In 2008, MM Packaging expanded its operations by acquiring 60% of Superpack, a Turkish folding cardboard manufacturer based in İzmir, which employed 120 people and operated two offset printing lines processing 8,000 tonnes of cardboard annually. However, the same year saw the closure of the Nikopol (Bulgaria) cardboard plant, incurring a liquidation cost of EUR 22.6 million.

In 2010, the Mayr-Melnhof Group (MM) closed its cartonboard mill in Deisswil near Stettlen, Switzerland, citing the emissions tax introduced in the country as the reason. However, the Department of the Environment, Transport, Energy and Communications (DETEC) countered this claim, noting that the mill had been exempted from the CO_{2} tax since it had committed to various CO_{2} reduction measures in 2008. Despite producing 112,000 tonnes of cardboard in 2009, MM considered the mill non-competitive. A plan was implemented for the 255 employees affected by the closure, as MM aimed to shift focus towards other more high-performance sites.

In mid-2013, MM Karton acquired the Folla CTMP mill in Norway from Södra, which had been shut down in September 2012 due to unprofitability. MM Karton resumed production at the mill to secure an autonomous raw material supply with semi-chemical pulps (CTMP and TMP) for its own cardboard production. A portion of the mill's annual capacity of 130,000 tonnes was also made available for free trade in the market.

Over the last decade, the main plant in Frohnleiten, Styria, has seen significant investment totaling more than 150 million euros aimed at modernising and expanding its logistics. Notably, in 2014, approximately 50 million euros were invested in developing the ‘Foodboard’ cardboard, a sustainable product designed to replace plastic packaging in the food industry.

=== 2020 to present day ===
In August 2021, MM sold its cardboard mills in Baiersbronn, Germany, and Eerbeek, Netherlands, to the US financial investor Oaktree Capital Management. Additionally, at the beginning of August, the Mayr-Melnhof Group expanded its operations by acquiring the cardboard and paper mills in Kwidzyn, Poland, and Kotkamills, Finland.

In April 2022, MM further diversified its portfolio by acquiring the Nordic pharmaceutical packaging group Eson Pac, headquartered in Veddige, Sweden. This acquisition marked a strategic expansion into the pharmaceutical packaging sector.

In October of the same year, MM continued its expansion in this sector by acquiring Essentra Packaging, a British pharmaceutical folding cardboard producer, along with its US subsidiary.

In 2020, plans were announced to invest about 100 million euros in the Frohnleiten site, focusing not only on the modernisation of the two existing carton machines, KM2 and KM3—handled by Graz-based Andritz AG—but also on enhancing the site's infrastructure and logistics. These upgrades included modernising the boiler house and wastewater treatment plant, as well as expanding parking areas for employees and delivery traffic. The conversion work was successfully completed by mid-2023. However, due to the economic impacts stemming from the Russian war against Ukraine, which led to a decline in global market demand, the plant had to temporarily reduce its production in the summer of 2023 and shut down its cardboard machines. This situation also necessitated a reduction in the short-term profit outlook, although the modernisation measures implemented remain intact.

== MM Board & Paper Production Sites ==
The production facilities of MM Board & Paper are distributed across several countries including the following key locations:

- Austria:
  - Frohnleiten: This is the main plant, employing 570 workers. It serves as a central hub for the company's operations in Austria.
- Germany:
  - Gernsbach
  - Neuss
- Finland:
  - Kotkamills in Kotka: Acquired in 2021, this facility is one of the newer additions to MM Board & Paper's portfolio, enhancing the company's production capabilities in the Nordic region.
- Norway:
  - FollaCell A.S. in Follafoss: This site adds to the company's presence in Scandinavia.
- Poland:
  - Kwidzyn: Another acquisition in 2021, this plant produces both cardboard and paper, and is part of the expansion of MM Board & Paper's operations into Eastern Europe.
- Slovenia:
  - Količevo
- United Kingdom:
  - Bootle, Merseyside: The Bootle plant worked closely with companies including Kellogg Company
  - Deeside, Wales: the operations at Deeside focus mainly upon food and tissue, while manufacturing for companies including Georgia-Pacific and Unilever. Both UK plants run a weekday 3-shift system as well as a dedicated weekend crew. At both UK plants, the company runs mainly Bobst group machinery in the cut-and-crease and finishing department, the Bootle plant operates a fully automated end of line department. In the print department of both, machinery from Koenig & Bauer is used.
