= Alexander, Prince zu Sayn-Wittgenstein-Sayn =

German businessman

Alexander zu Sayn-Wittgenstein-Sayn
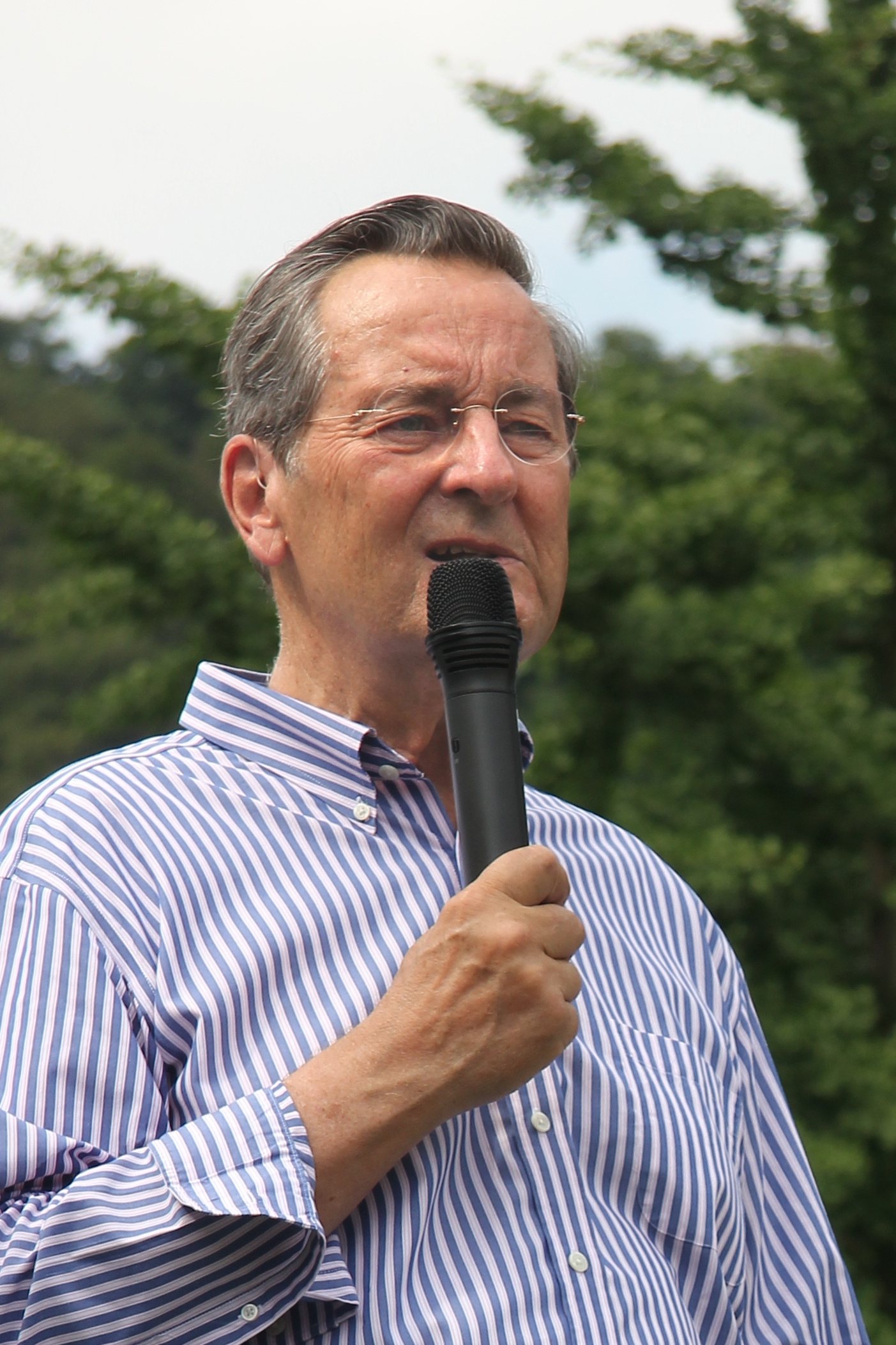
- Born: 22 November 1943 (age 82); Salzburg, Reichsgau Salzburg, Germany
- Spouse: Gabriela of Schönborn-Wiesentheid (m. 1969)
- Issue: Heinrich, Hereditary Prince zu Sayn-Wittgenstein-Sayn; Princess Alexandra; Prince Casimir; Princess Filippa; Prince Ludwig; Princess Sofia; Prince Peter
Names
- German: Alexander Konrad Friedrich Heinrich Fürst zu Sayn-Wittgenstein-Sayn
- House: Sayn-Wittgenstein-Sayn
- Father: Ludwig, 6th Prince zu Sayn-Wittgenstein-Sayn
- Mother: Baroness Marianne von Mayr-Melnhof
- Religion: Roman Catholic

Alexander Konrad Friedrich Heinrich Prinz zu Sayn-Wittgenstein-Sayn (born 22 November 1943) is a German businessman, who is head of the Princely House Sayn-Wittgenstein-Sayn.

== Early life ==
He was born in Salzburg as the first son of Ludwig, 6th Prince zu Sayn-Wittgenstein-Sayn (1915–1962) and his wife Baroness Marianne von Mayr-Melnhof (1919–2025). Following Prince Ludwig's death in 1962, Alexander succeeded as head of the princely house and, by tradition, as the 7th Prince (German: Fürst) zu Sayn-Wittgenstein-Sayn.

Alexander is a descendant of James II of England and his illegitimate son James Fitzjames, 1st Duke of Berwick, through his paternal great-grandmother Marie Auguste Yvonne de Blacas d'Aulps (1851-1881), daughter of Louis, Duke of Blacas.

== Career ==
Prince Alexander is vice president of Europa Nostra and president of Europa Nostra Germany. From 1986 to 2013, he served as president of the German Castles Association, which elected him on 28 April 2013 honorary president as well as president of the "Stiftung der Deutschen Burgenvereinigung" (Foundation of the German Castles Association).

== Personal life ==
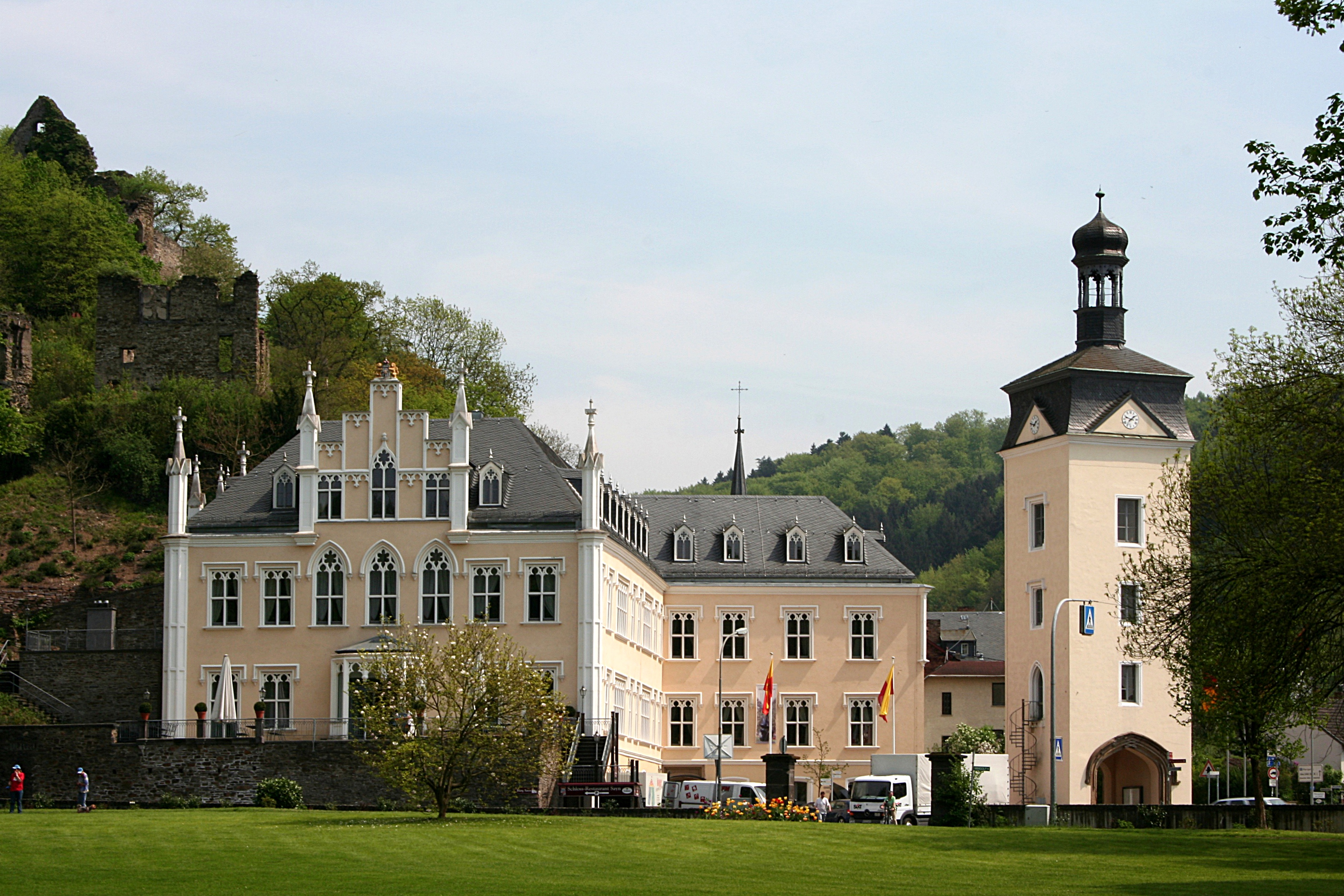
The fortress and the Sayn castle, Bendorf

In 1969, Alexander married Countess Gabriela von Schönborn-Wiesentheid (b. 1950) at Schloss Weißenstein, Pommersfelden.

They have seven children:

- Heinrich, Hereditary Prince zu Sayn-Wittgenstein-Sayn (b. 1971), who married Donna Priscilla Incisa della Rocchetta, daughter of Niccolo, Marchese Incisa della Rocchetta, in 2003, and they have issue.
- Princess Alexandra (b. 1973), who married Hereditary Prince Carl Eugen zu Oettingen-Wallerstein in 1994. They divorced in 2002 and she married Count Stefano Hunyady de Kéthely in 2006, and has issue from both marriages.
- Prince Casimir (b. 1976), who married (civilly) in 1999 Corinna Larsen (divorced in 2004), and married secondly to American model Alana Camille Bunte in 2019, and has issue from both marriages.
- Princess Filippa (1980–2001), who married Count Vittorio Mazzetti d'Albertis in June 2001; she was killed in an automobile accident in England three months later, without issue.
- Prince Ludwig "Louis" (b. 1982), who married in 2011 Countess Philippa Spannocchi, and they have issue.
- Princess Sofia (b. 1986), who married to Archia Akhavan-Kharazian, London based businessman of Iranian and Spanish roots, in 2020.
- Prince Peter (b. 1992), who married in 2025 Yurina Rachael Hattori-Roche, the daughter of entrepreneur and philanthropist Robert W. Roche.

== Patronages ==
- Honorary President of the German Castles Association.

== Honours ==
National honours

- Order of Merit of Rhineland-Palatinate.
- Member of the Order of Merit of the Federal Republic of Germany (2004).
- German Monument Protection Prize [Karl-Friedrich-Schinkel-Ring] (2018).

Foreign honours

- Knight of Honour and Devotion of the Sovereign Military Order of Malta.
