= Blister pack =

Type of packaging

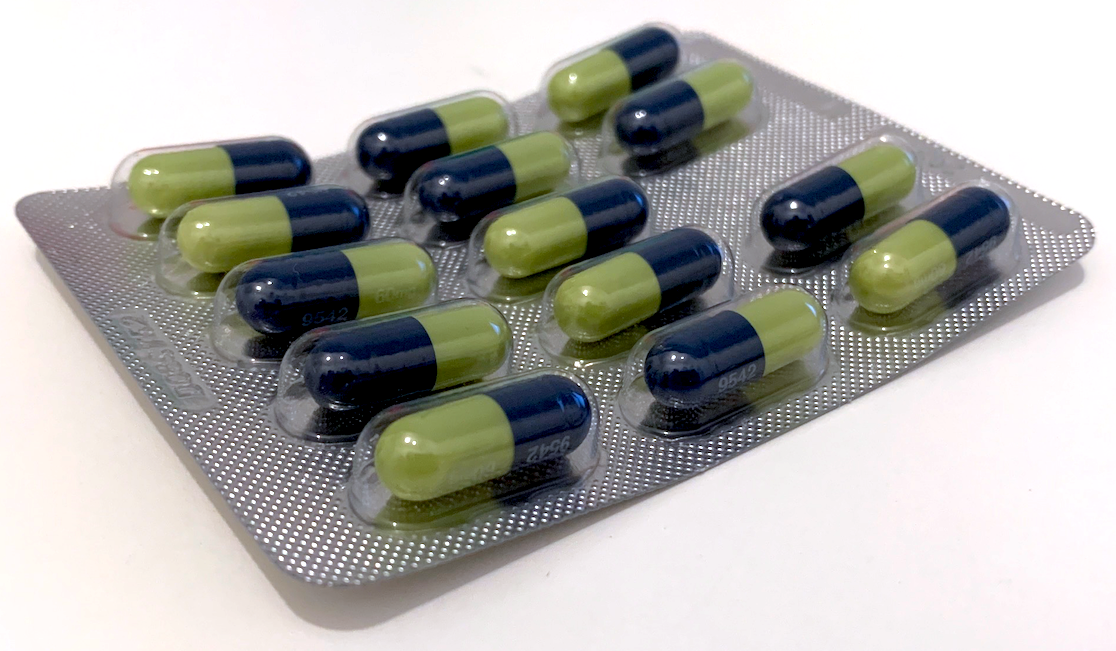
Pharmaceutical blister pack

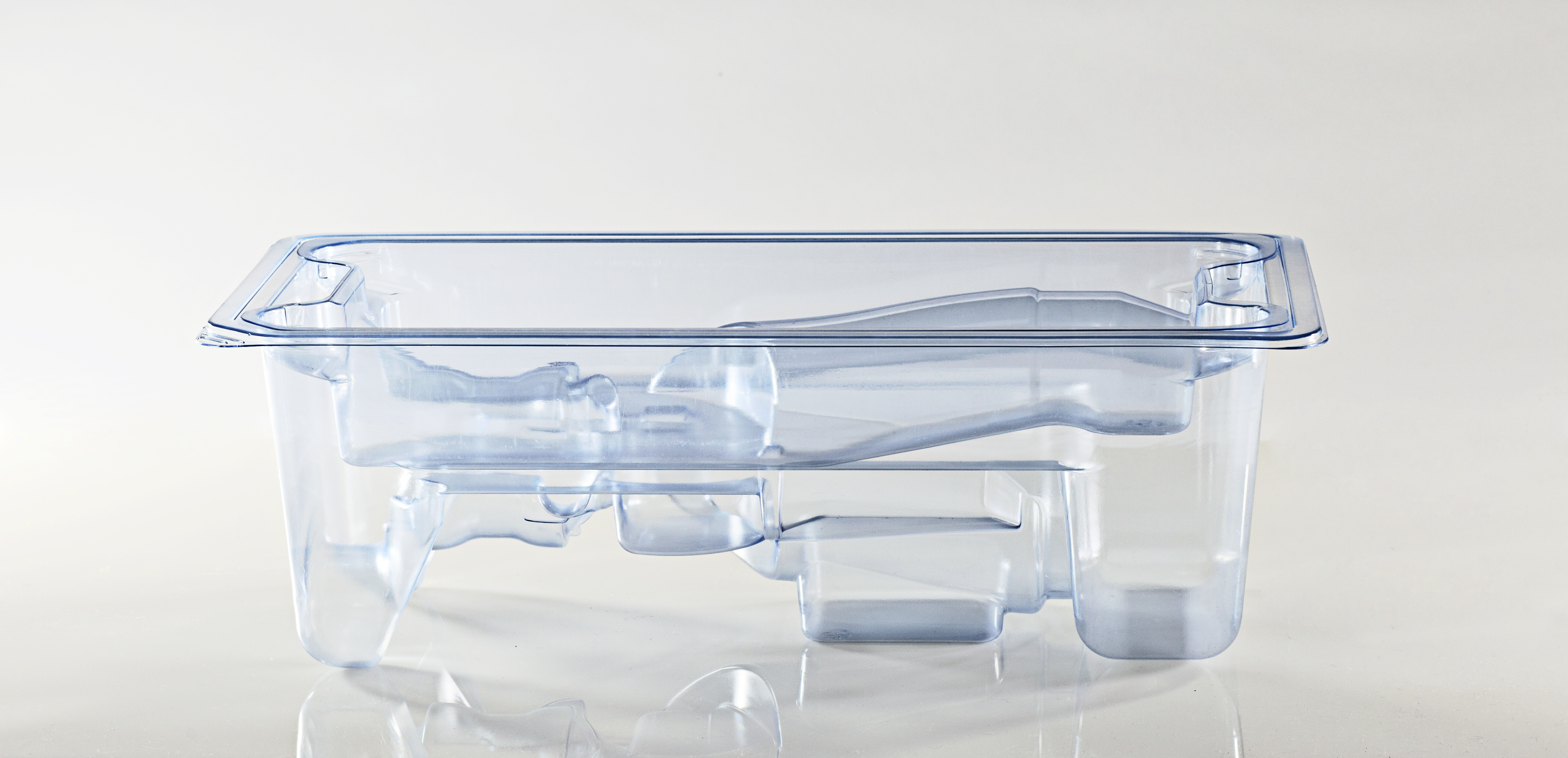
Empty blister pack

A blister pack is any of several types of pre-formed plastic packaging used for small consumer goods, foods, and for pharmaceuticals.

The primary component of a blister pack is a cavity or pocket made from a formable web, usually a thermoformed plastic. This usually has a backing of paperboard or a lidding seal of aluminum foil or plastic. A blister that folds onto itself is often called a clamshell.

Blister packs are useful for protecting products against external factors, such as humidity and contamination for extended periods of time. Opaque blisters also protect light-sensitive products against UV rays.

== Uses ==
Blister packs are used to package products such as toys, hardware, medication, etc. Many blister packaging machines use heat and pressure via a die to form the cavity or pocket from a roll or sheet of plastic. In recent years, improvements in cold forming—specifically allowing steeper depth/angles during forming, which minimizes the amount of material used for each cavity—have helped this technology increase. The main advantages of the plastic-based blister pack are its more compact size compared to cold formed aluminum and its transparency to see the product.

=== Unit dose packaging of pharmaceuticals ===
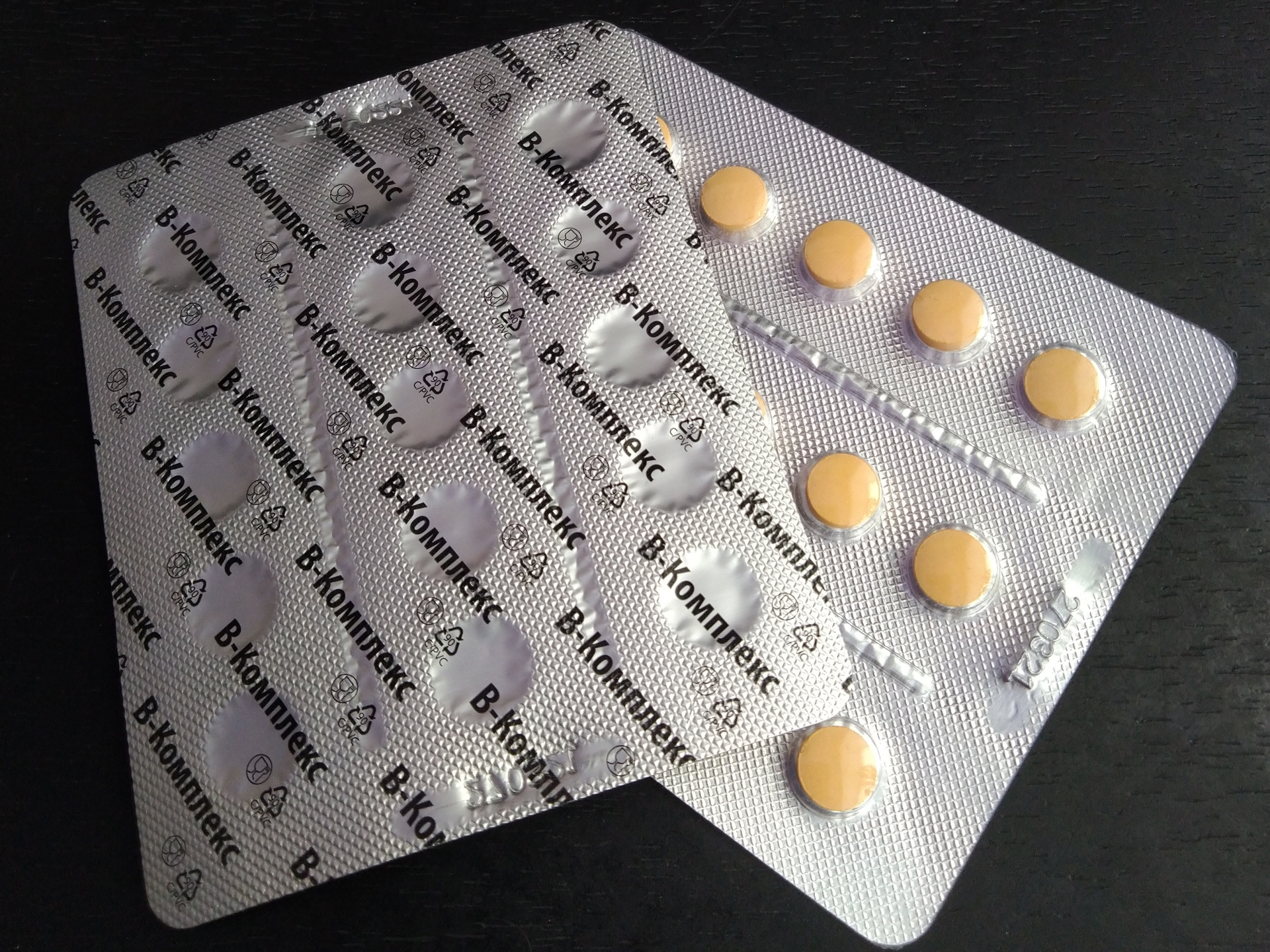
Tablets in a blister

Blister packs are commonly used as unit-dose packaging for pharmaceutical tablets, capsules or lozenges. Blister packs can provide barrier protection for shelf life requirements, and a degree of tamper resistance. In the US, blister packs are mainly used for packing physician samples of drug products or for over-the-counter (OTC) products in the pharmacy. In other parts of the world, blister packs are the main packaging type since pharmacy dispensing and re-packaging are not common. A series of blister cavities is sometimes called a blister card or blister strip as well as blister pack. The difference between a strip pack and blister pack is that a strip pack does not have thermo-formed or cold formed cavities; the strip pack is formed around the tablet at a time when it is dropped to the sealing area between sealing moulds. In some parts of the world the pharmaceutical blister pack is known as a push-through pack (PTP), an accurate description of two key properties (i) the lidding foil is brittle, making it possible to press the product out while breaking the lidding foil and (ii) a semi-rigid formed cavity being sufficiently collapsible to be able to dispense the tablet or capsule by means of pressing it out with the thumb. Breaking the lidding foil with a fingernail for the appropriate tablet will make the pressing out easier.

The main advantages of unit-dose blister packs over other methods of packing pharmaceutical products are the assurance of product/packaging integrity (including shelf-life) of each individual dose and the ability to create a compliance pack or calendar pack by printing the days of the week above each dose.

Blister packs are created by means of a form-fill-seal process at the pharmaceutical company or designated contract packer. A form-fill-seal process means that the blister pack is created from rolls of flat sheet or film, filled with the pharmaceutical product and closed (sealed) on the same equipment. Such equipment is called a blisterline. There are two types of blister machine' design: rotary and flat-plate, depending on the mechanism for sealing the lidding foil.

=== Consumer goods ===
A typical blister-packaged consumer good made by vacuum forming

Other types of blister packs consist of carded packaging where goods such as toys, hardware, and electrical items are contained between a specially made paperboard card and clear pre-formed plastic such as PVC. The consumer can visually examine the product through the transparent plastic. The plastic shell is vacuum-formed around a mold so it can contain the item snugly. The card is colored and designed depending on the item inside, and the PVC is affixed to the card using heat and pressure to activate an adhesive (heat seal coating) on the blister card. The adhesive is strong enough so that the pack may hang on a peg, but weak enough so that the package can be easily opened (in theory). Sometimes, with large items, the card (cold seal card) has a perforated window for access.

=== Clamshell ===
A hinged blister is known as a clamshell, used for a variety of products. It can be used as a security package to deter package pilferage for small high-value items, such as consumer electronics. It consists of one sheet folded over onto itself and sometimes fused at the edges. They can be securely heat sealed, making them difficult to open by hand to deter tampering. A pair of scissors or a sharp knife is often required to open them (although these are often sold in similar packages). Trauma shears are also effective at opening packaging of this type. Care must be used to safely open some of these packages, as opening it without care can result in injury; 6,000 Americans are sent to the emergency room each year by injuries suffered in opening such packages. Wrap rage is sometimes the result.

=== Medical blister trays ===
Medical blister trays differ from pharmaceutical blister packs in that these are not push-through packs. The thermoformed base web is made of a thicker plastic sheet, generally between 500 and 1,000 μg and can not be collapsed, thus forming a solid tray. The lidding film provides a peel-open feature and is generally porous to allow sterilization (such as the Dupont medical Tyvek material). Such medical blister packs are used for sterile medical devices, used in hospitals.

== Methods ==
=== Thermoforming ===
In the case of thermoforming, a plastic film or sheet is unwound from the reel and guided though a pre-heating station on the blister line which will cause the plastic to soften and become pliable. The warm plastic will then arrive in a forming station where a large pressure (4 to 8 bar [400 to 800 kPa; 58 to 116 psi]) will form the blister cavity into a negative mold. The mold is cooled such that the plastic becomes rigid again and maintains its shape when removed from the mold. In case of difficult shapes, the warm film will be physically pushed down partially into the cavity by a "plug-assist" feature. By introducing a rigid or semi-rigid “plug” to guide the heated thermoplastic sheet into the mold, this method addresses common challenges like uneven wall thickness, thinning in critical areas, and incomplete mold filling. It is particularly used for shapes with deep draws, complex geometries, or tight tolerances.

=== Cold forming ===
In the case of cold forming, an aluminum-based laminate film is simply pressed into a mold by means of a stamp. The aluminum will be elongated and maintain the formed shape. In the industry these blisters are called cold form foil (CFF) blisters. The principal advantage of cold form foil blisters is that the use of aluminum offers a near complete barrier for water and oxygen, allowing an extended product expiry date. The principal disadvantages of cold form foil blisters are: the slower speed of production compared to thermoforming; the lack of transparency of the package (a therapy compliance disadvantage); and the larger size of the blister card (aluminum can not be formed with near 90-degree angles).

=== Thermo cold forming ===
In a thermo cold forming process, the first packing is done by thermoforming technique, after which the product is repacked with a cold-formed package.

== Materials ==
=== PVC ===
The most basic material for the forming web is polyvinyl chloride (PVC). The principal advantages of PVC are the low cost and the ease of thermoforming. The main disadvantages are the poor barrier against moisture ingress and oxygen ingress. In the case of blister packaging the PVC sheet does not contain any plasticizer and is sometimes referred to as Rigid PVC or RPVC. In the absence of plasticizers, PVC blisters offer structural rigidity and physical protection for the pharmaceutical dosage form. On the other hand, the blister cavity must remain accessible by the push-through effect and the formed web may not be too hard to collapse when pressed upon; for this reason the PVC sheet thickness is typically chosen between 200 and 300 μm depending on the cavity size and shape. Most PVC sheets for pharmaceutical blisters are 250 μm (0.25 mm) in thickness. Typical values for the Water Vapor Transmission Rate (WVTR or MVTR) of a 250 μm PVC film are around 3.0 g/m^{2} per day measured at 38 °C (100 °F) and 90% RH and the Oxygen Transmission Rate (OTR) is around 20 mL/m per day. In order to overcome the lack of barrier properties of PVC film, it can be coated with PVDC or laminated to PCTFE or COC to increase the protective properties. Multi-layer blister films based on PVC are often used for pharmaceutical blister packaging, whereby the PVC serves as the thermoformable backbone of the structure. Also, the PVC layer can be colored with pigments and/or UV filters. The European Pharmacopoeia (Ph Eur) references the requirements for PVC blister packs for pharmaceutical primary packaging in the monograph EP 3.1.11 "MATERIALS BASED ON NON-PLASTICISED POLY(VINYL CHLORIDE) FOR CONTAINERS FOR DRY DOSAGE FORMS FOR ORAL ADMINISTRATION". In order to be suitable for pharmaceutical blister packs, the PVC formulation also needs to comply with the US Pharmacopoeia <661>; EU food legislation; US 21.CFR and Japanese food contact requirements.

=== PVDC ===
Polyvinylidene chloride (PVDC) can be coated onto a PVC film to obtain very high moisture and oxygen barrier properties depending on the coating weight. PVDC coated blister films are the most common and prevailing barrier films used for pharmaceutical blister packs. PVDC coatings are also the most economical method of adding water barrier and oxygen barrier properties to a PVC film. PVDC blister films are available in 2 or 3 layer specifications, referred to as duplex or triplex. Since the PVDC is applied by a coating process, the coating weight is expressed in grams per square meter (gsm). Duplex structures are typically PVC/PVDC films, ranging from 250μ PVC/40gsm PVDC to 250μ PVC/120gsm PVDC; with WVTR from 0.65 to 0.25 g/m^{2} and OTR from 1 to 0.1 cc/m per day. For very deep draw thermoformed cavities, the triplex specifications are used: PVC/PE/PVDC, where the PE (polyethylene) layer assists when forming deeper cavities. The PE forms a soft intermediate layer between the rigid PVC and PVDC layers. Triplex specifications exist in similar coating weights to duplex specifications: 250μ PVC/25μ PE/40gsm PVDC up to 250μ PVC/25μ PE/120gsm PVDC. In order to obtain high barrier properties, PVDC is always applied using an emulsion coating process using a PVDC resin dispersed in water. The film producer applies the coating in several steps, drying off the water between each coating station.

PVDC grades are available in 2 types of polymer:

- the historic grades offering medium to high barrier properties, and
- a super barrier coating grade offering the highest barrier.

The SBC grade has over twice the barrier to moisture and oxygen per gram coating weight compared to the historic grades. The most common structures using the super barrier PVDC are triplex configurations 250μ PVC/25μ PE/120gsm PVDC up to 250μ PVC/25μ PE/180gsm PVDC, with WVTR of 0.11 to 0.06 g/m^{2} per day and available from various suppliers.

=== PCTFE ===
Polychlorotrifluoroethylene (PCTFE) can be laminated to PVC to obtain very high moisture barrier. Typical constructions used for pharmaceutical products are 250μ PVC film laminated to 15μ-150μ PCTFE film. Duplex structures are PVC/PCTFE and triplex laminates are PVC/PE/PCTFE. Deeper cavities can be formed by using the triplex structures with PE. Typical WVTR values are 0.06–0.40 g/m^{2} per day. PCTFE films have the lowest water vapor permeation compared to all other plastic films used in blister packaging and have thermoforming properties similar to plain PVC though it is also the most expensive. Despite narrow thermoforming temperatures and required cooling steps PP is increasingly popular. This popularity is due in part to it not suffering the environmental liability that PVC suffers in discharging hydrochloric acid during incineration. Unplasticized PVC has good thermoforming properties but may not provide good moisture protection for some products. After the forming process a 250 μm film will have a final thickness of 50 to 100 μm in some deep drawn pockets. The reduction in thickness will result in an increase in WVT.

=== COC ===
Cyclic olefin copolymers (COC) or polymers (COP) can provide moisture barrier to blister packs, typically in multilayered combinations with polypropylene (PP), polyethylene (PE), or glycol-modified polyethylene terephthalate (PETg). Cyclic olefin resins are generally amorphous and are noted for good thermoforming characteristics even in deep cavities, leading some to use COC in blister packaging as a thermoforming enhancer, particularly in combination with semicrystalline resins such as PP or PE. Films can be manufactured via coextrusion or lamination. WVTR values of commercial cyclic olefin-based pharmaceutical blister films typically range from 0.20 to 0.35 g/m^{2} per day at 38 °C (100 °F) and 90% RH. Unlike PVC and other common pharmaceutical barrier resins, cyclic olefin resins do not contain chlorine or other halogens in their molecular structure, being composed solely of carbon and hydrogen. Cyclic olefin resins are available which comply with pharmaceutical packaging guidelines in the US, Europe, and Japan.

=== Cold form foil ===
Cold form foil film (or cold-formed foil) is made of a 3-layer laminate: PVC/Aluminum/Polyamide. The PVC side is on the inside in contact with the product.

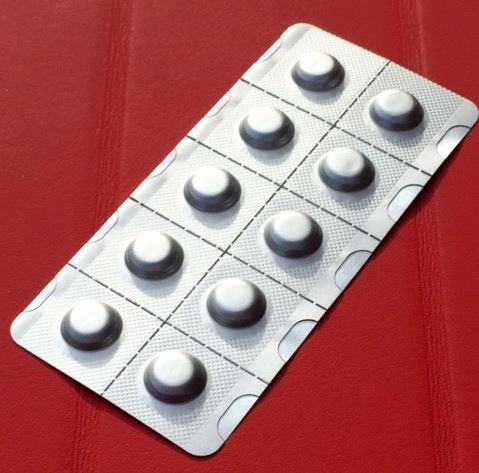
Cold Form Foil blister pack

=== Lidding foils ===
Pharmaceutical blister packs are mostly closed by a push-through or peel-open lidding foil. The most common lidding foil with push-through features is 20 μm hard tamper aluminum, which can be supplied pinhole-free from the producers. The lidding foil is coated with a heat-seal lacquer on the inside and a print primer on the outside.

== See also ==
- Heat sealer
- Pharmacy automation
- Skin pack
- Ultrasonic welding
- Wrap rage
