= Sunnyi Melles =

Swiss actress

- Princess Peter of Sayn-Wittgenstein-Sayn
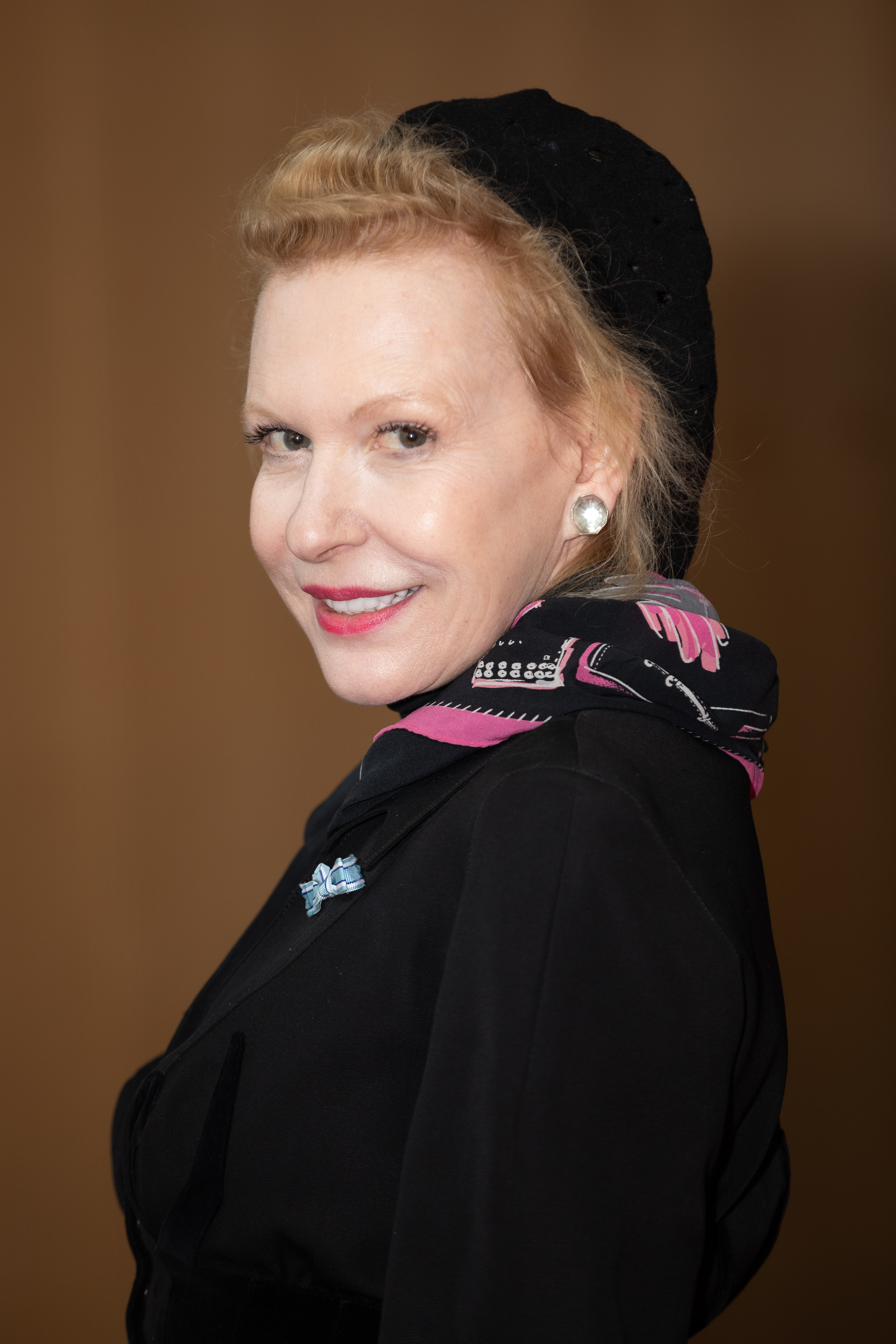
- Melles in 2020
- Born: 7 October 1958 (age 67); Luxembourg, Luxembourg
- Spouse: Prince Peter of Sayn-Wittgenstein-Sayn (m. 1993)
- Issue: Prince Constantin; Princess Leonille
- Occupation: Actress

Princess Sunnyi of Sayn-Wittgenstein-Sayn (née Melles, born 7 October 1958) is a Swiss-Hungarian actress active in Germany and Austria.

== Biography ==
She is the only daughter of Austrian orchestral conductor Carl Melles and Hungarian noblewoman Judith von Rohonczy (1929-2001), an actress, daughter of actress Ila Lóth. Since 1993, she has been married to Prince Peter of Sayn-Wittgenstein-Sayn (b. 1954), son of photographer Marianne, Princess zu Sayn-Wittgenstein-Sayn. They have a son and a daughter:

- Prince Constantin Victor Ludwig of Sayn-Wittgenstein-Sayn (b. 1994);
- Princess Leonille Elisabeth Judith Maria Anna of Sayn-Wittgenstein-Sayn (b. 1996).

== Selected filmography ==
- Derrick - Season 8, Episode 8: "Prozente" (1981, TV series episode), as Alice Hollerer
- Die Leidenschaftlichen (1982, TV film), as Charlotte
- Who's Crazy, Doc? (1982), as Marlene Schulz
- Tatort: Miriam (1983, TV series episode), as Miriam Schultheiss
- The Roaring Fifties (1983), as Bambi
- Rote Erde (1983, TV series), as Sylvia von Kampen
- Paradise (1986), as Angelika
- Maschenka (1987), as Lilli
- '38 – Vienna Before the Fall (1987), as Carola
- Faust (1988), as Gretchen (with Helmut Griem as Faust)
- Money (1989), as Gabriele Gessmann
- Mit den Clowns kamen die Tränen (1990, TV miniseries), as Norma Desmond
- Ich schenk dir die Sterne (1991), as Laura Montesi
- Maigret: Maigret at the Crossroads (1992, TV series episode), as Else
- The Rat (1997, TV film), as Damroka
- Long Hello and Short Goodbye (1999), as Aurelia
- Olgas Sommer (2004), as Ella
- Live Wire (2009), as Sigrid Freesmann
- The Marriage Swindler and His Wife (2012, TV film), as Gabriele Muntz
- Freshly Squeezed (2012), as Franziska Schnidt
- Hotel Adlon: A Family Saga (2013, TV miniseries), as Ottilie Schadt
- The Invention of Love, as Amine von Kirsch
- Altes Geld (2015), as Liane Rauchensteiner
- Der Bauer zu Nathal (2018)
- Kaisersturz as German Empress Augusta Victoria
- The Awakening of Motti Wolkenbruch (2018), as Mrs. Silberzweig
- Enfant Terrible (2020)
- Triangle of Sadness (2022)
- Becoming Karl Lagerfeld (2024), as Marlene Dietrich
- Mr. K (2024)

== Awards ==
=== Deutscher Fernsehpreis ===
- 2024: "Beste Schauspielerin" (best actress) for Die Zweiflers (ARD/Degeto/hr/Turbokultur)
