= Buildbase =

UK company

- Type: Private
- Industry: Construction
- Products: Building Material
- Number of employees: 3000+ (2016)
- Parent: Huws Gray
- Website: www.buildbase.co.uk

Buildbase is a builders’ merchants in the United Kingdom, and is approaching two hundred branches nationwide. Buildbase is part of Huws Gray having been bought from Grafton Group plc in a deal that saw Grafton sell its merchanting business in the UK. It is a member of the Builders Merchants Federation (BMF).

Buildbase sells to the building trade and the general public, with products including general building materials, timber, landscaping materials, drainage products, insulation and plasterboard, kitchens and bathrooms, plumbing and heating, roofing products, doors, windows and stairs and painting and decorating materials. Buildbase operates a specialist tool, plant, and equipment hire business called Hirebase, and an electrical and lighting wholesaler called Electricbase.

== Sponsorship ==
The company was the main sponsor of Oxford United F.C. for nine seasons, culminating in the club's promotion back into the Football League, and as of 2015, had sponsored speedway team Coventry Bees for a number of seasons. Other sponsorship's include the Buildbase BMW Motorrad team in the British Superbike Championship, formerly the Kawasaki team, and TT rider Michael Dunlop.

On 15 June 2015, Tividale Football & Social Club announced that Buildbase would become their principle sponsor until the summer of 2017. Tividale play their football in the Northern Premier League, Division One South, and finished 8th in the campaign for 2014 to 2015.

On 16 August 2016, the Football Association announced that Buildbase are the official title sponsor of The Buildbase FA Trophy and The Buildbase FA Vase for the season of 2016 to 2017. This sponsorship was extended until 2019. The finals of the Buildbase FA Vase and Buildbase FA Trophy competitions are held at Wembley Stadium.
