= Nisbets =

Multinational food-service company

- Company type: Private
- Industry: Commercial Catering
- Founded: 1983; 43 years ago
- Founder: Andrew Nisbet
- Headquarters: Avonmouth, Bristol
- Products: Catering equipment, Own-brand goods, Online, Mail order, Retail
- Owner: Bunzl (2024–present)
- Number of employees: 1,800
- Website: www.nisbets.co.uk

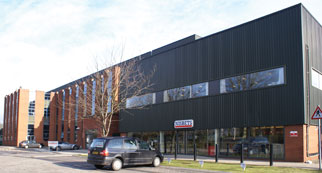
Nisbets' Headquarters, 4th Way, Avonmouth

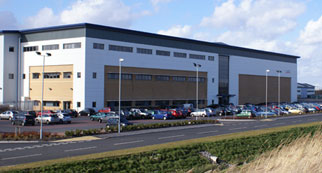
Nisbets new warehouse, Access-18, Avonmouth

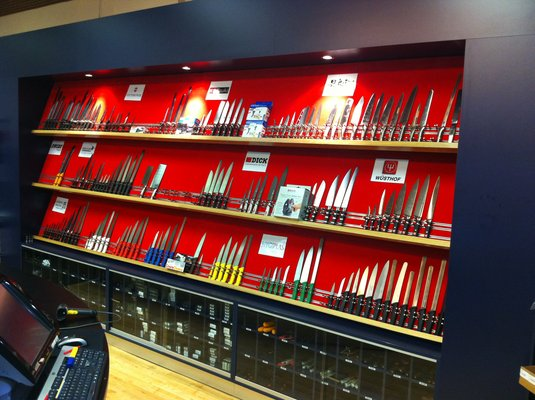
Knife display in Nisbets London store, Covent Garden, London

Nisbets is multinational distributor to the food-service sector. The company develops, retails and distributes commercial kitchen equipment, catering supplies and other hospitality products and services to hotels, restaurants, bars, cafes, schools and colleges. Nisbets is majority owned by Bunzl.

== History ==
Nisbets was founded by Andrew Nisbet in 1983. It started out selling knives, catering clothing and textbooks to catering colleges, building on the business of Nisbet’s father, Peter Nisbet, which provided catering kits to colleges in South West England.

In 1987, the company launched its first mail-order catalogue, selling products to students and trade customers. Nisbets acquired catering wholesaler Red Ball in 1990, which was rebranded as RB Distributors, and enabled the company to start wholesaling to shops and other retailers for the first time.

By 1995, the company stocked 8,000 products for next-day delivery. The business opened its first non-UK office in 1996 in Cork, Ireland.

In 2000, Nisbets opened an office in the Netherlands, the company's first physical presence outside of the British Isles. The new office was responsible for mail-order sales of Nisbet products in Holland and Belgium. Nisbets opened offices in France in 2005 and Spain in 2007 with further offices in Germany, Belgium and Portugal.

In 2010, six years after relocating to new, larger premises in Avonmouth, Bristol, the firm acquired Caterers Warehouse, an established Australian catering retailer, and Pages, a catering retail outlet on Shaftesbury Avenue, London - the company's first retail shop. Between 2010 and 2017, Nisbets opened 29 stores across the UK, focusing on major cities and towns.

In 2016, the firm acquired microwave distributor Bradshaw Microwave, linen manufacturer Mitre Linen and a stake in commercial fit out and restaurant furniture manufacturer Space Group. The following year, it was listed as the 58th fastest growing company in the UK.

In 2017, the year in which it won The Queen's Award for Enterprise and claimed to have 12 retail outlets in Australia, In the same year, it opened its flagship store and showroom, the National Catering Equipment Centre (NCEC), the largest of its kind in the UK.

In 2022 Nisbets acquired three companies - UK Engineers, a specialist in the servicing and repair of catering equipment; Jongor Hire, a provider of temporary catering equipment and furniture and Beaumont, a renowned manufacturer & supplier of barware. Also in 2022, Nisbets appointed three independent non-executive directors to its Board.

On 26 February 2024, the Nisbet family agreed to sell an 80% stake in their catering equipment firm, Nisbets, to Bunzl for £339 million, in a deal valuing the company at over £500 million. On May 28, 2024, it was announced that Bunzl had completed its acquisition of the firm.

== Operations ==
In August 2023, Nisbets is an omnichannel, offering for customers globally, with 17 localised websites. The company has its main European distribution centre in Avonmouth, Bristol and Chepstow, UK, with other centres in Cork, Ireland; Auckland, New Zealand, and Campbelltown, Leppington and New South Wales, Australia. Nisbets also operates two sourcing centres in India and China. There are also four fulfilment warehouses in Avonmouth.
