= Bunzl =

British multinational distribution and outsourcing company

Bunzl Public Limited Company
- Formerly: Bunzl Pulp & Paper Limited (1940–1982)
- Type: Public limited company
- Traded as: LSE: BNZL; FTSE 100 Component
- Industry: Distribution and outsourcing
- Founded: 1854; 172 years ago (Pozsony, Hungary)
- Headquarters: London, England, UK
- Key people: Peter Ventress (Chairman); Frank van Zanten (CEO)
- Products: Distribution of catering equipment, cleaning products, paper and plastic packaging, food processing equipment, medical gloves and disposable hygiene products, personal protective equipment, vending machine supplies
- Revenue: ▲£11,845.4 million (2025)
- Operating income: ▼£735.3 million (2025)
- Net income: ▼£459.8 million (2025)
- Number of employees: 27,000 (2026)
- Website: www.bunzl.com

Bunzl Public Limited Company is a British multinational distribution and outsourcing company headquartered in London, England.

The activities of the company have changed a number of times during its existence, frequently incorporating the disparate business interests of the founding Bunzl family, which trace their history back to a haberdashery opened in Pozsony in 1854. The current company was established in London in 1940 as a manufacturer of cigarette filters, crêpe and tissue paper, and the production of fibres, pulp, paper, building materials and plastics were all brought into the firm – and subsequently sold – over the following decades. Bunzl restructured itself as a company purely focused on distribution through a divestment campaign that began in the early 1990s and ended with the 2005 spin out of Filtrona.

Bunzl has been listed on the London Stock Exchange since 1957 and is a constituent of the FTSE 100 Index.

== History ==
=== 1854–1938 ===
In 1854, Moritz Bunzl registered haberdashery Emanuel Biach's Eidam in Pozsony – then part of the Habsburg monarchy, now part of Slovakia. In 1883, his 3 sons, Max Bunzl, Ludwig Bunzl and Julius Bunzl, changed the name of the company to Bunzl & Biach AG, and moved the headquarters to Vienna, Austria.

From 1888 they began manufacturing paper in Ortmann, and then at Wattens paper mill. From 1925 Hungarian inventor Boris Aivaz, who had patented the process of making cigarette filters from crepe paper, with some variants including cellulose wadding, experimented at the Ortmann plant. Aivaz produced the first cigarette filter from 1927 in co-operation with Bunzl's Filtronic subsidiary, but up take was low due to a lack of machinery to produce cigarettes with the filtered tip.

From 1935, a British company began producing a machine to make cigarettes that incorporated the filter tip, and so the Bunzl family developed their British interests. Following the Anschluss in 1938, with many Jewish assets and companies seized by the Nazi regime, the Bunzl family emigrated from Austria. While some moved to the United States and Switzerland, the majority settled in England to develop their small British operation.

=== 1940–1957 ===
The company now known as Bunzl was established in the UK in 1940 by Austrian immigrants Martin Bunzl, Hugo Bunzl and George Bunzl under the name Tissue Papers Limited, which adopted a similar line of business, manufacturing filters along with tissue and crêpe paper. The firm did not begin to grow substantially until after World War II, when the family reclaimed its assets in Austria. Although the two companies were not merged at this time, Tissue Papers Ltd. became the international distributor of Bunzl & Biach's paper and pulp products and as a result changed its name to Bunzl Pulp & Paper Ltd. in 1952.

International expansion followed throughout the 1950s: a filter production factory was opened in South Africa, while a separately-run company named American Filtrona was set up in the United States in 1954. Use of cigarette filters increased markedly in the 1950s as links between smoking and cancer were established, and Bunzl soon became the exclusive supplier to both Imperial Tobacco and Gallaher Group. Between 1956 and 1964, Bunzl's production of filters increased by a factor of twelve.

=== 1957–1980: Public listing and diversification ===
The company floated around 30% of its shares on the London Stock Exchange in 1957, with the Bunzl family retaining a majority stake for another decade. As the growth in uptake of filter cigarettes began to tail off at the end of the 1960s, the firm's profits followed, experiencing their first fall as a publicly traded company in 1969. Around the same time, Bunzl Pulp & Paper's position in the cigarette filter market was investigated by the Monopolies and Mergers Commission at the request of Courtaulds, which Bunzl had recently dropped as its supplier of cellulose acetate. Although ultimately Bunzl was found to have held but not abused a monopolistic position, the company determined to diversify its products to revive profit growth.

In 1970 the original Austrian business Bunzl & Biach was acquired, meaning that the company was now involved in the manufacture of paper for the first time, and adhesive tape and plastics divisions were also established later in the decade. The strategy failed to stem declining profits in the long term, which were exacerbated by a smaller cigarette filter market as tobacco companies began to manufacture them in-house. A foray into data processing services also proved particularly unsuccessful, losing money for the company.

=== 1980–2005: Distribution ===
At the beginning of the 1980s, the company embarked upon a new strategy to arrest a decline in its fortunes. A new chief executive, James White, was installed, and Bunzl & Biach AG and its associated paper mills were sold only a decade after becoming a part of the company. Bunzl began to move into the distribution sector by acquisition, beginning with the American plastic and paper products reseller Jersey Paper in 1981. Other business lines established included package delivery and foodservice.

The late 1980s and early 90s saw the outsourcing and distribution businesses in the US, Europe and Australia expanded, particularly in the area of disposable food packaging. This growth helped the company enter the FTSE 100 for the first time in October 1986, replacing financial services group British & Commonwealth Holdings. At the same time, the company sold off a number of non-core and underperforming assets, a process accelerated under the guidance of Anthony Habgood, who replaced White as CEO in 1991. Foodservice, paper merchanting and building material supply businesses were all divested by 1994. The company's plastics and fibres interests were also consolidated with the purchase of American Filtrona, the company originally established by the Bunzl family, for $178 million in 1997. Koch Supplies was acquired by Bunzl in 2001.

Bunzl's last link with the paper industry was severed in 2002 with the sale of its fine paper distribution arm. This left the company with just two remaining business divisions: Outsourcing Services and Filtrona (encompassing fibres, cigarette filters and plastics). Three years later, Filtrona was spun off as a stand-alone entity, leaving Bunzl with just its distribution business. The same year, former Goodyear Dunlop executive Michael Roney was appointed CEO, with Habgood becoming chairman.

=== 2006–present: Acquisitions ===
In 2006, Bunzl purchased Keenpac, a supplier of luxury paper-based packaging, high-density polythene bags and jewellery boxes operating in the UK, US, France, Italy, Switzerland, Hong Kong and Australia.

In December 2012 the company acquired McCordick Glove & Safety, a distributor of personal protection equipment, based in Canada. As well as Atlas Health Care, a distributor of medical consumables to the health care sector, based in Australia.

In October 2015, Bunzl bought Planet Clean, a distributor of cleaning and hygiene supplies and equipment, based in Canada.

In 2022, Bunzl expanded their portfolio by acquiring the majority of German cleaning and hygiene B2B onlineshop hygi.de.

In 2023, Bunzl expanded into its 32nd country with the acquisition of the Safety First Group.

In February 2024, the company announced the acquisition of a majority stake in Nisbets, the British distributor to the food-service sector. Bunzl acquired an 80% equity stake for £339 million, valuing the company at £500 million.

== Operations ==
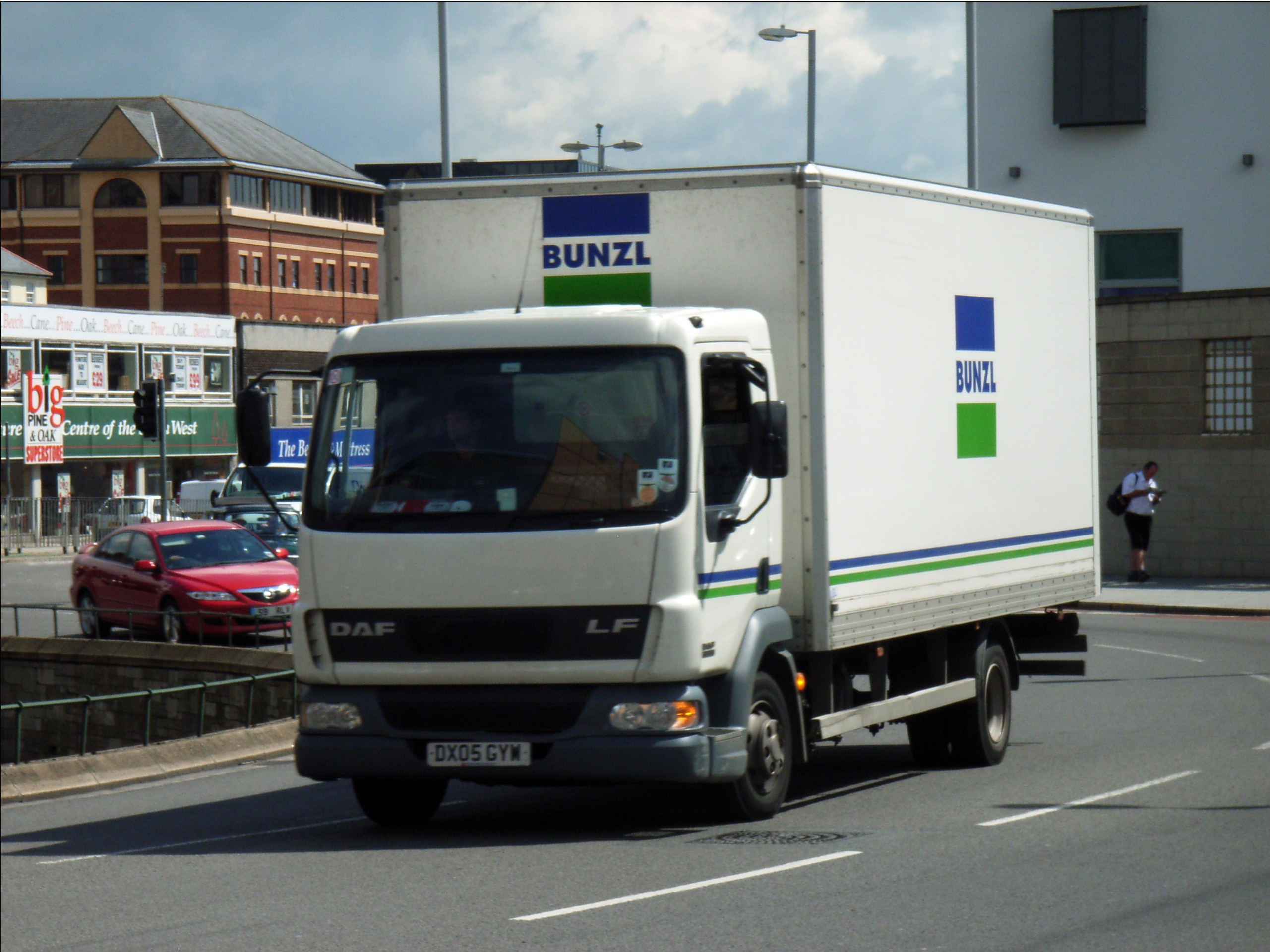
A Bunzl distribution lorry.

The company divides itself geographically into four business units: North America is the largest, followed by the UK and Ireland, Continental Europe and the rest of the world (principally Australasia). Bunzl's largest two markets, generating over half of total business between them, are foodservice and food retail companies. Products distributed include machinery and safety and hygiene equipment for food processors and chemicals, packaging and disposable tableware for caterers and retailers. The company's other markets include cleaning and safety, where personal protective equipment, cleaning machinery and first aid kits are supplied, and convenience stores, to which carrier bags, point of sale displays and packaging and labelling are amongst the major products distributed. In North America, Bunzl is also a major wholesaler of foodservice and janitorial products.

=== Sectors ===
- Supply, repair and maintenance of catering equipment
- Contract cleaning
- Convenience stores
- Food processors (Bunzl Processor Division)
- Healthcare
- Hotel & catering
- Redistributors
- Retail
- Safety
- Vending

=== Countries of operation ===
- Australia
- Austria
- Belgium
- Brazil
- Canada
- Chile
- China
- Colombia
- Czech Republic
- Denmark
- France
- Germany
- Hong Kong
- Hungary
- (Republic of Ireland) Ireland
- Israel
- Italy
- Mexico
- Netherlands
- New Zealand
- Peru
- Poland
- Puerto Rico
- Romania
- Singapore
- Slovakia
- Spain
- Switzerland
- Turkey
- United Kingdom
- United States

== Corporate affairs ==
=== Financial information ===
Bunzl plc financial results.
Year ended	Revenue (£ million)	Profit/(loss) before tax (£m)	Net profit (£m)	Earnings per share (p)
2025	11,845.4	620.5	459.8	141.5
2024	11,776.4	673.6	500.4	149.6
2023	11,797.1	698.6	526.2	157.1
2022	12,039.5	634.6	474.4	141.7
2021	10,285.1	568.7	442.8	132.7
2020	10,111.1	555.7	430.0	128.8
2019	9,326.7	453.3	349.2	104.8
2018	9,079.4	424.8	326.5	98.4
2017	8,580.9	409.3	310.5	94.2
2016	7,429.1	362.9	265.9	80.7
2015	6,489.7	322.7	232.7	71.0
2014	6,157	299.8	210.7	64.5
2013	6,098	332.1	206.8	63.5
2012	5,359	293.8	191.3	58.7
2011	5,110	193.7	123.8	38.2
2010	4,830	225.2	159.0	49.1
2009	4,649	257.8	148.9	46.4
2008	4,177	206.9	142.2	44.5
2007	3,582	191.1	130.1	39.8
2006	3,333	189.7	129.4	37.8
2005	2,924	176.7	124.2	35.4
2004^{[A]}	2,438	158.2	141.4	30.7
2004^{[B]}	2,438	200.9	127.4	28.7
2003^{[C]}	2,276	194.6	124.6	27.4

^{A} Accounts prepared according to International Financial Reporting Standards.
^{B} ^{C} Accounts prepared according to United Kingdom Generally Accepted Accounting Principles.

=== Major shareholders ===
At 22 February 2010, four institutions held a stake of three percent or greater in Bunzl: Invesco (11.9%), Aviva (6.3%), Legal & General (4.0%) and Newton Investment Management (4.0%).

== See also ==
- Filtrona, former Bunzl subsidiary now listed on the London Stock Exchange
- Wattenspapier, company formerly owned by Bunzl & Biach
