= Grafton Group =

Ireland-based builders merchant

Grafton Group plc
- Type: Public limited company
- Traded as: LSE: GFTU; FTSE 250 component
- Industry: Building materials
- Founded: 1902; 124 years ago
- Headquarters: Dublin, Ireland
- Key people: Michael Roney (Chairman); Eric Born (CEO)
- Revenue: ▲€ 2,519.6 million (2025)
- Operating income: ▲€ 174.8 million (2025)
- Net income: ▲€ 136.6 million (2025)
- Website: graftonplc.com

Grafton Group plc is a builders merchants business headquartered in Ireland and operating in the United Kingdom and Ireland. It is listed on the London Stock Exchange, and is a constituent of the FTSE 250 Index.

== History ==
=== Early years (1902–1987) ===
Previous logo

In 1902, William Thomas Chadwick established a builders' merchants and building contractors business in Dublin. It was incorporated as Chadwicks (Dublin) Ltd in 1909.

In 1930, Chadwick acquired a roof tile and concrete block manufacturing business in Dublin. He registered that business as Concrete Products of Ireland Ltd in 1931.

Concrete Products of Ireland Ltd became a public limited company (plc) and incorporated Chadwicks (Dublin) Ltd in 1965, and building materials company Marley increased its holding in the company to 51%. Michael Chadwick bought out Marley and renamed the business Grafton Group in 1987.

=== Expansion in Ireland and the UK (1988–2012) ===
In 1988, Concrete Products of Ireland plc changed its name to Grafton Group plc.

In March 1998, it bought British Dredging, a United Kingdom builders merchants including the Selco Builders Warehouse chain. In February 2003, it bought Jackson Building Centres, another British builders merchants, based in Lincolnshire.

In October 2003, it also bought Plumbline, Scotland's largest independent plumbers merchants. In June 2004, it bought Heiton Group, Ireland’s largest independent plumbers merchants. In December 2006, it then bought Plumbworld, one of the United Kingdom’s largest online bathroom retailers.

=== Recent developments (2013–present) ===
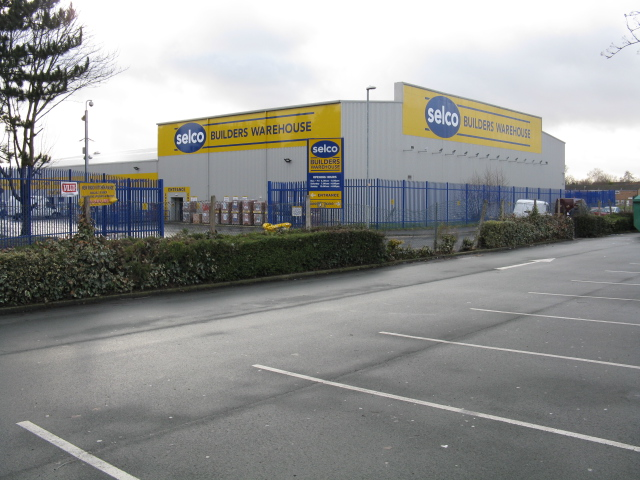
Selco is part of Grafton Group.

In August 2013, it bought Wearside builders' merchant Thompsons, in October 2013, it bought Binje Ackermans, a Brussels based merchanting operation, and in December 2013, Grafton Group opened ten showrooms, and launched a brand new website called Bohen, which focuses on the bathroom, kitchen and bedroom industry.

Then in September 2014, it bought Direct Builders Merchants, a general merchanting business based in Kent and in December 2014, it bought Crescent Building Supplies, a builders' merchant based in Ruislip. In March 2015, it bought TG Lynes, a distributor of mechanical engineering products, in January 2016, it bought T Brewer, a timber distributor based in London, and in March 2016, it bought Allsand Supplies, a general builders' merchant located in Kent.

In January 2022 the company announced the completion of the sale of its merchanting business in the UK to Huws Gray for £520m. Businesses sold include Buildbase, Civils & Lintels, PDM Buildbase, The Timber Group, Bathroom Distribution Group, Frontline and NDI Brands.

== Operations ==
The company currently owns three physical "bricks and mortar" businesses, Woodie's DIY, Selco and Jacksons brands. It also has a number of businesses that trade exclusively online.
