= Carl Melles =

Austrian orchestral conductor

Carl Melles (born Melles Károly; 15 July 1926 – 25 April 2004) was an Austrian orchestral conductor of Hungarian descent.

== Personal life ==
He married Hungarian noblewoman Judith von Rohonczy (1929–2001), daughter of an actress, Ila Lóth. They are parents of an actress Sunnyi Melles, who is married to Prince Peter zu Sayn-Wittgenstein-Sayn.

== Work ==
He conducted Wagner's Tannhauser at the 1966 Bayreuth Festival.

== Sources ==
- Howell, Christopher. "Forgotten Artists. An occasional series by Christopher Howell. 23. Carl Melles (1926–2004)" MusicWeb International July 2017.
