= Azelis Group =

Belgium food ingredient distributor

- ISIN: BE0974400328
- Industry: Chemicals and Food Ingredients
- Founded: 2001
- Headquarters: Antwerp

Azelis Group is a Belgium-based distributor specializing in food ingredients and specialty chemicals, headquartered in Antwerp. It has been listed on Euronext since 2021 and has presence in Europe, the Middle East and Africa, Asia-Pacific, and the Americas.

== History ==
Azelis Group was established by the merger of Novorchem (Italy), and Arnaud (France) in 2001. In 2004, Azelis acquired Benelux companies: Sibeco Group and Sepulchre. In 2005, Azelis acquired a chemical distributor Brøste from Denmark. In December 2006, 3i global finance house bought the Azelis Group from Cognetas (now Motion Equity Partners) for over €300 million.

As of 2011, the company had 36 companies under its brand name. In 2021, Azelis Group was listed on Euronext Brussels through an IPO, having raised €1.77 billion with a market capitalization of €6.08 billion. Bloomberg noted that it was the biggest Belgian IPO since 2007.

In 2022, Azelis Group made 12 acquisitions and exceeded $4 billion in turnover.
