= Tear tape =

Device enabling easy opening of packaging

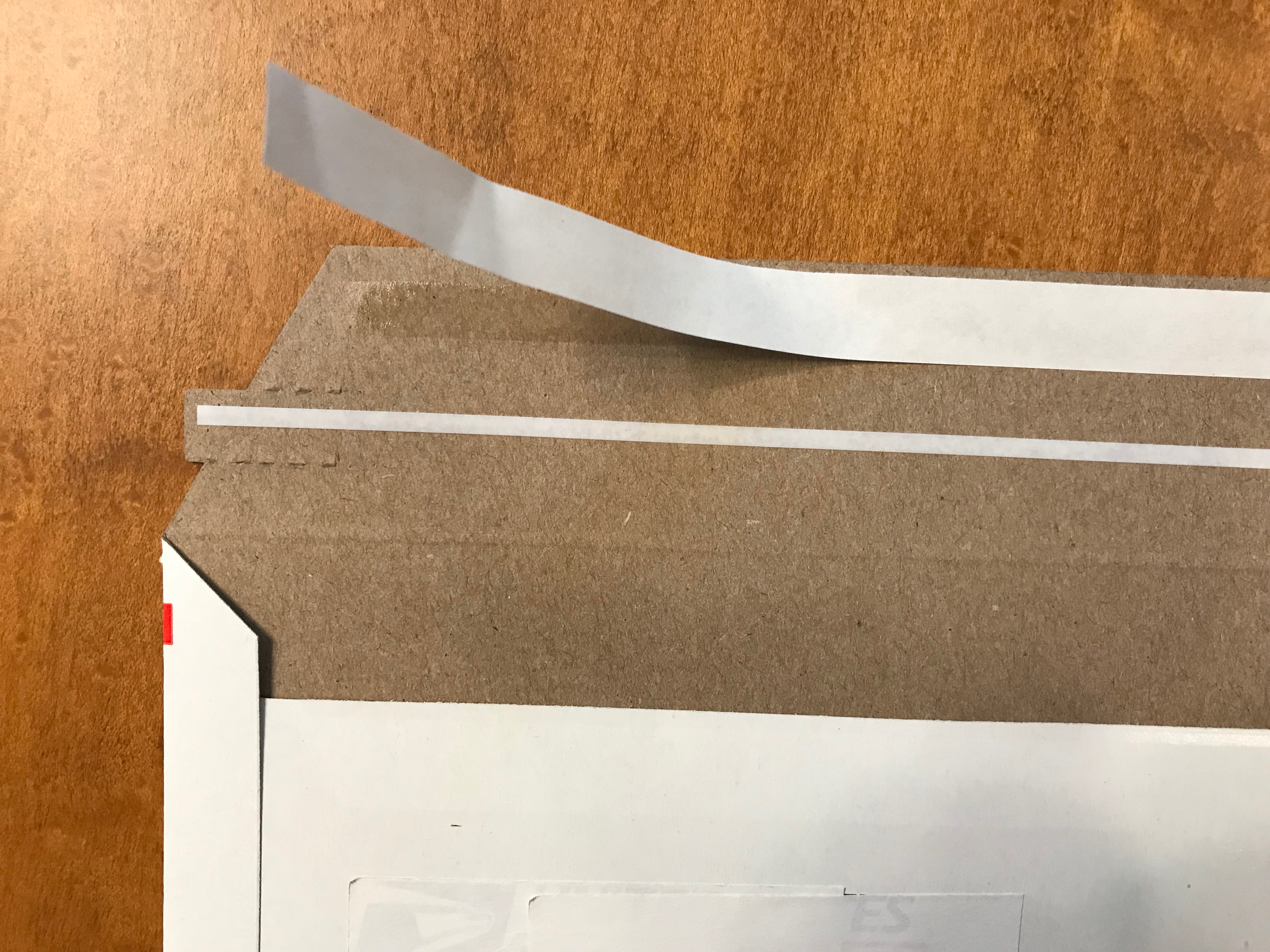
Paperboard mailing envelope showing PSA adhesive with release liner and with tear tape

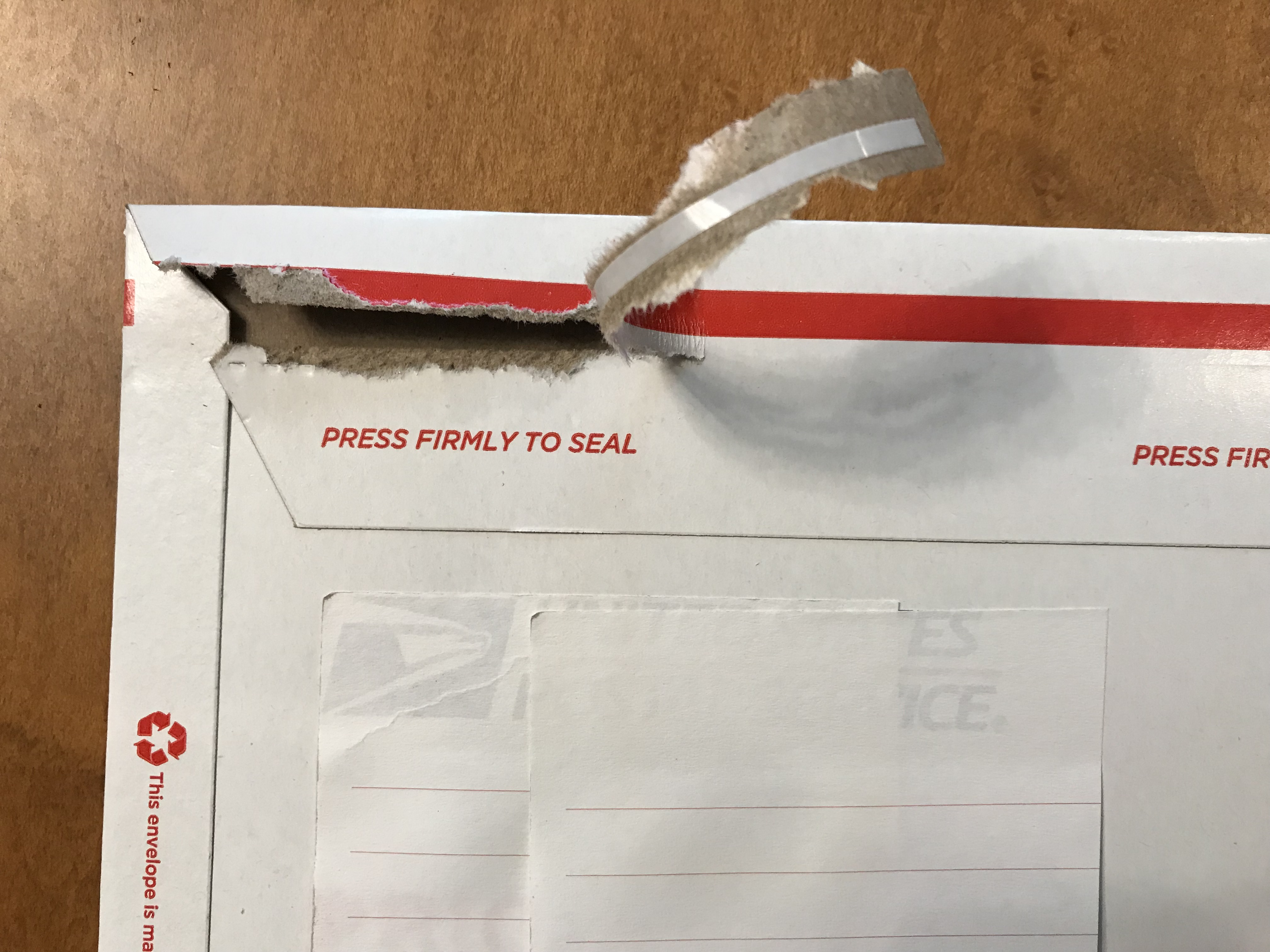
Closed mailer being opened by pulling tear tape

Tear tape, also known as tearstrip or tear-off ribbon, is a narrow adhesive tape used to open packaging. The backing is often a narrow oriented polymer such as polypropylene but other polymers, yarns, and filaments are also used. Many tear tapes use a pressure sensitive adhesive but others have a heat-activated adhesive system.

Tear tape is usually attached to the inner surface of packaging: paper, paperboard, corrugated fiberboard or plastic film. It is used on common non-durable fast-moving consumer goods such as soft drinks, groceries or toiletries, as well as tobacco products such as cigarettes and cigars, to aid the opening of the packaging. It is also used in courier envelopes and corrugated boxes. Tear tape serves as an easy opening device for the consumer, where it obviates the need for opening tools such as scissors or knives, or the use of excessive force. Tear tape provides a guide on the tear area, thereby allowing more precise opening which reduces product spillage.

Tear tape is available in several constructions and has a variety of uses.

== See also ==
- Wrap rage
