= Ancillon =

Ancillon is a surname. Notable persons with that name include:

- Charles Ancillon (1659–1715), French jurist and diplomat
- Friedrich Ancillon (1767–1837), Prussian historian and statesman
- David Ancillon (1617–1692), French Huguenot pastor and author
- Louis Pierre Ancillon de la Sablonnière, French businessman
