= Crown Treaty =

1700 treaty between Brandenburg and Emperor Leopold I

In the Crown Treaty (also called Treaty of the Crown, Krontraktat in German) signed on 16 November 1700, Frederick III, Elector of Brandenburg and Duke of Prussia, had undertaken to provide a body of 8,000 men for the impending Spanish War of Succession for Emperor Leopold I. In return, the emperor promised that Frederick's future self-coronation as "King in Prussia" would be recognised across Europe and the Holy Roman Empire. The relevant negotiations were mainly undertaken by Charles Ancillon. The coronation took place on 18 January 1701 in Königsberg; from April 1701 the now entitled "Royal Prussian Contingent" deployed to the Lower Rhine at Wesel. In April 1702, it took part in hostilities for the first time at the Siege of Kaiserswerth.

== Sources and references ==
- Hamish Scott & Brendan Simms, Cultures of Power in Europe During the Long Eighteenth Century, Cambridge University Press, 05/07/2007
- Peter Wilson, German Armies: War and German Society, 1648-1806, Routledge, 2002
- Thomas Henry Dyer, Modern Europe: 1593-1721, G. Bell & Sons, 1877
