= Queen Sophia =

Queen Sophia or Queen Sophie may refer to:

- Sophia of Minsk, Queen of Denmark
- Sophia of Denmark (1241–1286), Queen of Sweden
- Sophia of Bavaria (1376–1425), Queen of Bohemia
- Sophia of Halshany (1405?–1461), Queen of Poland
- Sophie of Pomerania (1498–1568), Queen of Denmark and Norway
- Sophie Amalie of Brunswick-Calenberg (1628–1685), Queen of Denmark and Norway
- Sophie of Mecklenburg-Güstrow (1557–1631), Queen of Denmark and Norway
- Sophia Charlotte of Hanover (1668–1705), Queen in Prussia
- Sophia Louise of Mecklenburg-Schwerin (1685–1735), Queen in Prussia
- Sophia Dorothea of Hanover (1687–1747), Queen in Prussia
- Sophie Magdalene of Brandenburg-Kulmbach (1700–1770), Queen of Denmark and Norway
- Sophia Magdalena of Denmark (1748–1813), Queen of Sweden
- Sophie of Württemberg (1818–1877), Queen of the Netherlands
- Sophia of Prussia (1870–1932), Queen of Greece
- Queen Sofía of Spain (born 1938), Queen of Spain
