= Johannetta of Sayn-Wittgenstein =

Johannetta of Sayn-Wittgenstein may refer to:

- Johannetta of Sayn-Wittgenstein (1561–1622)
- Johannetta of Sayn-Wittgenstein (1632–1701)
