= Sayn-Wittgenstein =

County of medieval Germany

County of Sayn-Wittgenstein Grafschaft Sayn-Wittgenstein
- 1384–1607
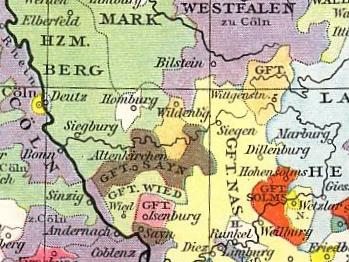
- Sayn and Wittgenstein ca. 1450
- Status: State of the Holy Roman Empire
- Capital: Wittgenstein Castle
- Government: Principality
- Historical era: Middle Ages
  - Count of Sayn-Homburg marries heiress to Wittgenstein: 1345
  - Counties merged: 1384
  - Partitioned to S-W-Sayn, S-W-Berleburg and S-W-Wittgenstein: 1607
  - Mediatised to Berg: 1808
Preceded by
Sayn-Homburg
County of Wittgenstein
Succeeded by
Sayn-Wittgenstein-Berleburg
Sayn-Wittgenstein-Sayn
Sayn-Wittgenstein-Wittgenstein
- Today part of: Germany

Sayn-Wittgenstein was a county of medieval Germany, located in the Sauerland of eastern North Rhine-Westphalia.

== History ==
Sayn-Wittgenstein was created when Count Salentin of Sayn-Homburg (1314-1392), a member of the House of Sponheim, married the heiress Countess Adelheid of Wittgenstein (1320-1357) in 1345. The united counties then became known as Sayn-Wittgenstein, although it only officially became known as such during the reign of Salentin's successor Count John. The territory of Sayn-Wittgenstein was often divided between northern (centered on Bad Berleburg) and southern (centered on Bad Laasphe) divisions, although the border between the two often shifted. Sayn-Wittgenstein was partitioned in 1607 into: Sayn-Wittgenstein-Berleburg, Sayn-Wittgenstein-Sayn (in the originally territories of Sayn), and Sayn-Wittgenstein-Wittgenstein. The area of both former counties is known today as "Wittgenstein", and is part of the district Siegen-Wittgenstein in the state of North Rhine-Westphalia.

== Family today ==
Four dynastic branches of the House of Sayn were extant at the beginning of the 20th century, each possessing its own secundogeniture. In order of seniority of legitimate descent from their progenitor, Ludwig I, Count of Sayn-Wittgenstein (1532-1605), they were the:

1. Princes (Fürsten) zu Sayn-Wittgenstein-Berleburg, descended from Count Georg (1565-1631)
2. Princes (Fürsten) zu Sayn-Wittgenstein-Sayn, descended from Count Christian Ludwig (1725-1797)
3. Counts zu Sayn-Wittgenstein-Berleburg, descended from Count Georg Ernst (1735-1792)
4. Princes (Fürsten) zu Sayn-Wittgenstein-Hohenstein, descended from Count Ludwig (1571-1634)

Some of these lines had junior branches, both dynastic and non-dynastic, the latter including families whose right to the princely title was recognized by the Russian, Prussian, Bavarian or Austrian monarchies, whereas other morganatic branches used lesser titles accorded by German sovereigns (e.g. Baron von Kleydorff, Hesse, 1868; Count von Hachenburg, Prussia, 1883; Baron von Freusburg, Lippe, 1916; Baron von Altenburg, ?, 1909). The last male of the comital line was Ottokar, Count zu Sayn-Wittgenstein-Berleburg (1911-1995).

On the death of Ludwig, 3rd Prince of Sayn-Wittgenstein-Hohenstein in 1912, the eldest of his three sons, Hereditary Prince August (1868-1947), became 4th Prince of Sayn-Wittgenstein-Hohenstein and head of the third branch of the House of Sayn. Being a childless bachelor, the elder of whose two younger brothers, Georg (1873-1960), had married morganatically, while the younger, Wilhelm (1877-1958), was 49 and yet unmarried, August preserved the name and heritage of his branch of the House of Sayn by adopting Christian Heinrich Prinz zu Sayn-Wittgenstein-Berleburg (1908-1953). He was the second son of the late head of the entire House of Sayn, Richard, 4th Prince of Sayn-Wittgenstein-Berleburg (1882-1925), whose eldest son, Gustav Albrecht (1907-1944) had inherited the senior line's fortune and position.

In November 1960, Christian Heinrich, being the divorced father of two daughters by his dynastic marriage to Countess Beatrix von Bismarck-Schönhausen (1921-2006), married Dagmar Prinzessin zu Sayn-Wittgenstein-Hohenstein (1919-2002), elder daughter of his adopted father's younger brother, Georg, who died seven months before the wedding. As Georg's children by his morganatic wife, Marie Rühm (1892-1975), (created Baroness von Freusburg by the reigning Prince of Lippe in 1916) had been de-morganatized by the declaration of their uncle August on 11 February 1947, her marriage to Christian Heinrich was deemed a dynastic match, ensuring that their son Bernhart would be born in compliance with the house laws of his adoptive ancestors, the Sayn-Wittgenstein-Hohensteins, as well as being a grandson of the last dynastic male of that family, Prince Georg.

== Counts of Sayn-Wittgenstein (1354–1607) ==
- Eberhard (1469–1494)
- George I (1427–1469)
- John (1384–1427)
- Louis I (1568–1605)
- Salentin, Count of Sayn-Homburg (1354–84)
- William I (1494–1568)

== Properties ==
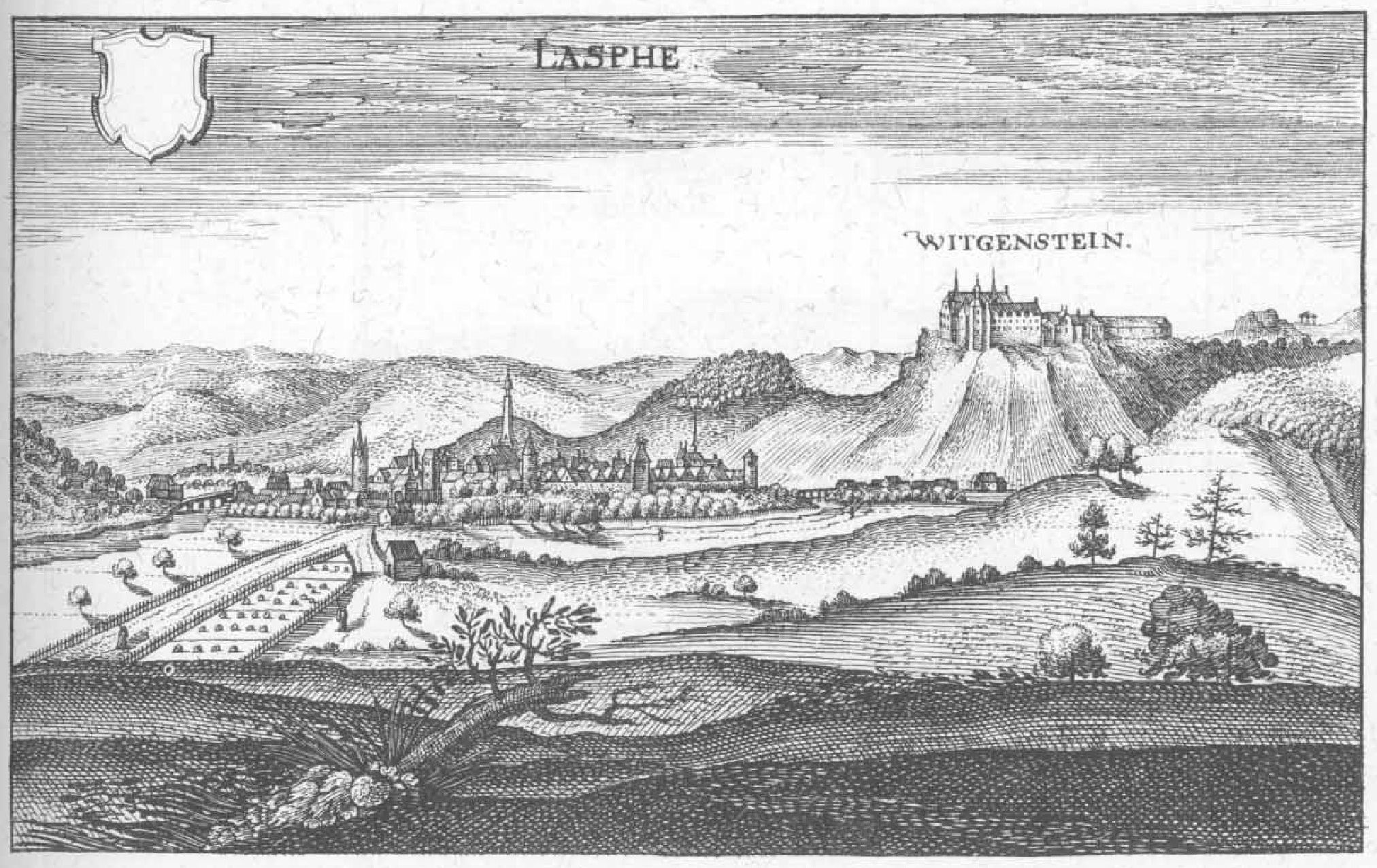
Wittgenstein in 1655

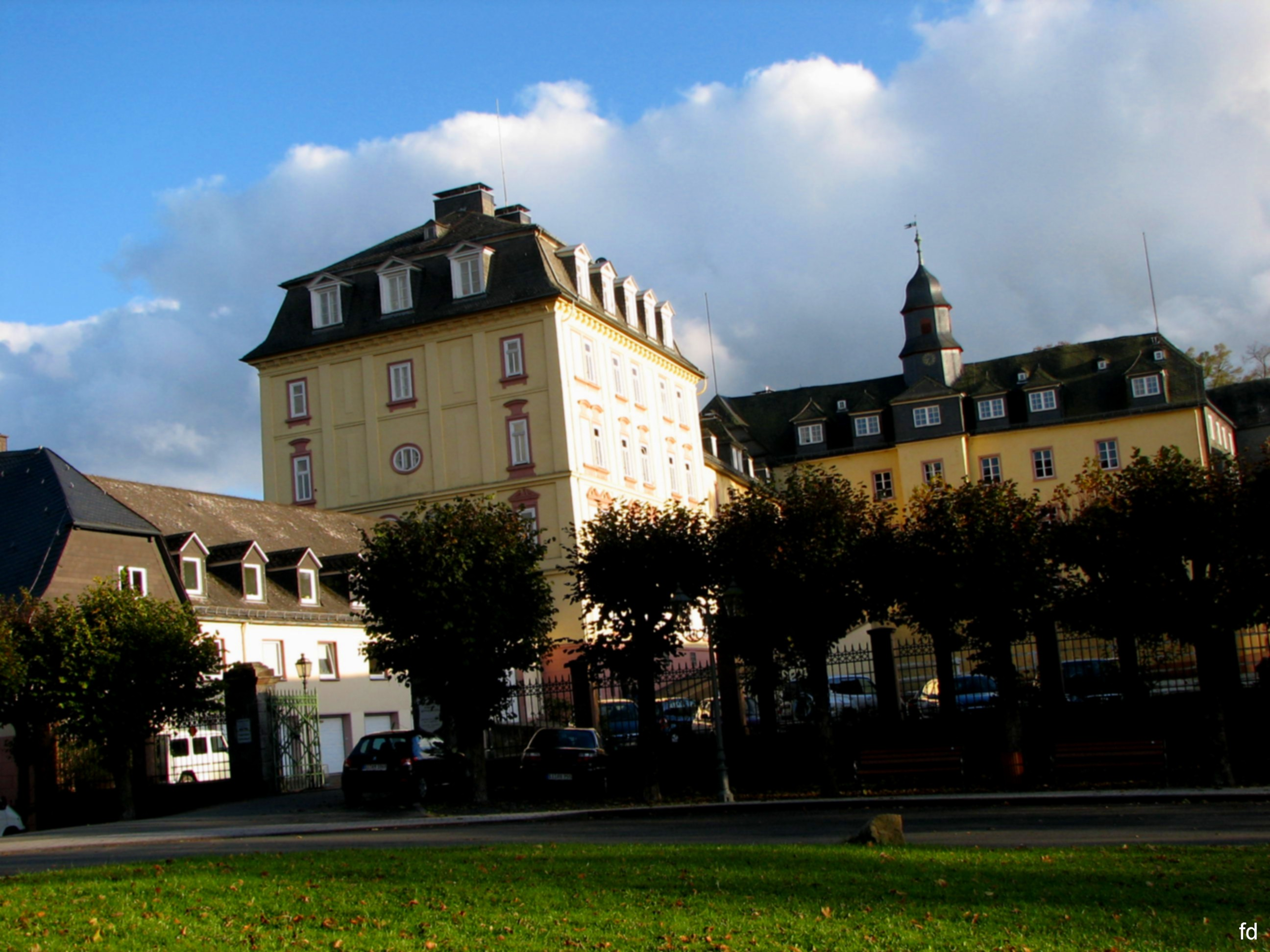
Wittgenstein Castle (near Bad Laasphe) in 1903

The princely castle at Bad Berleburg

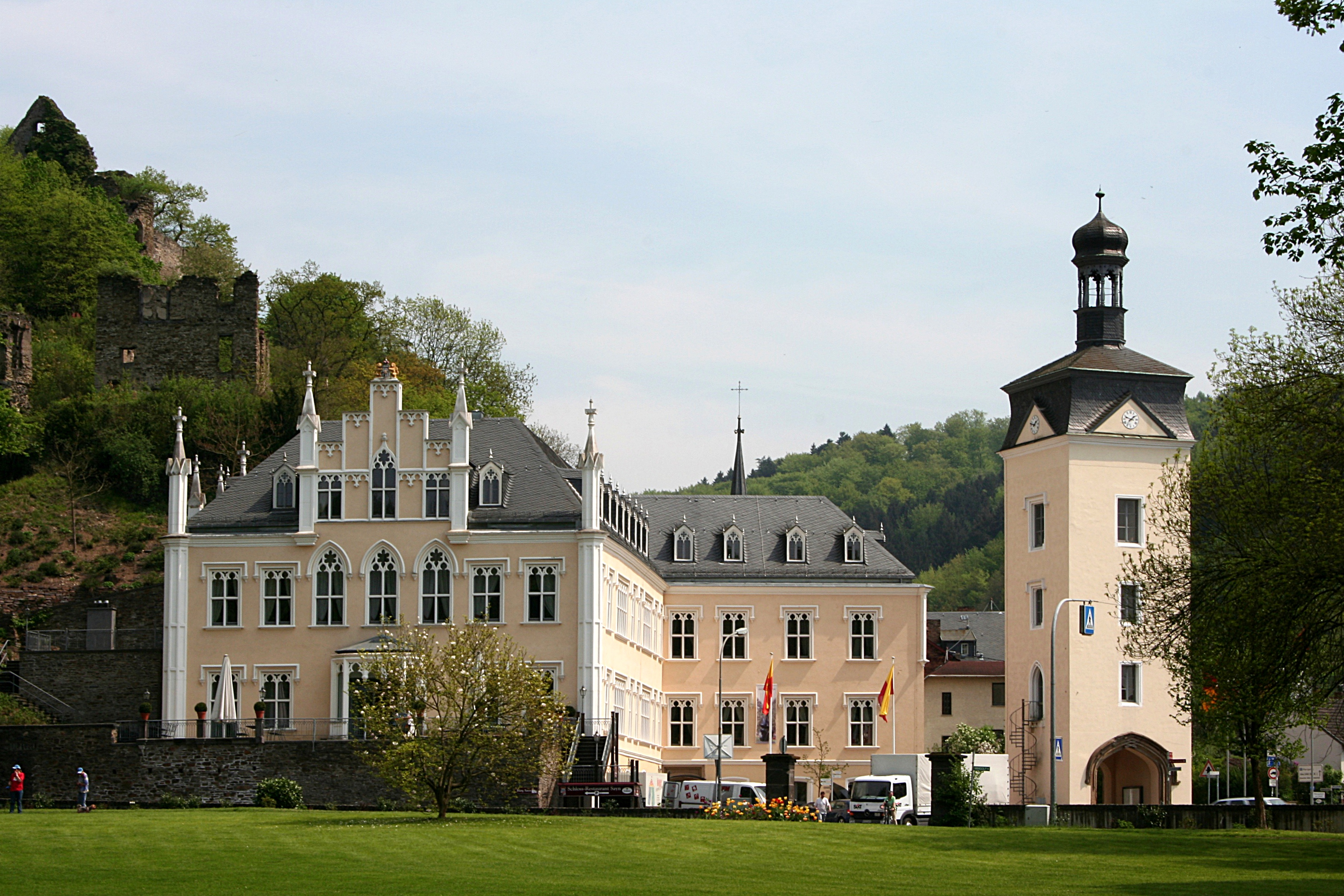
Sayn Castle

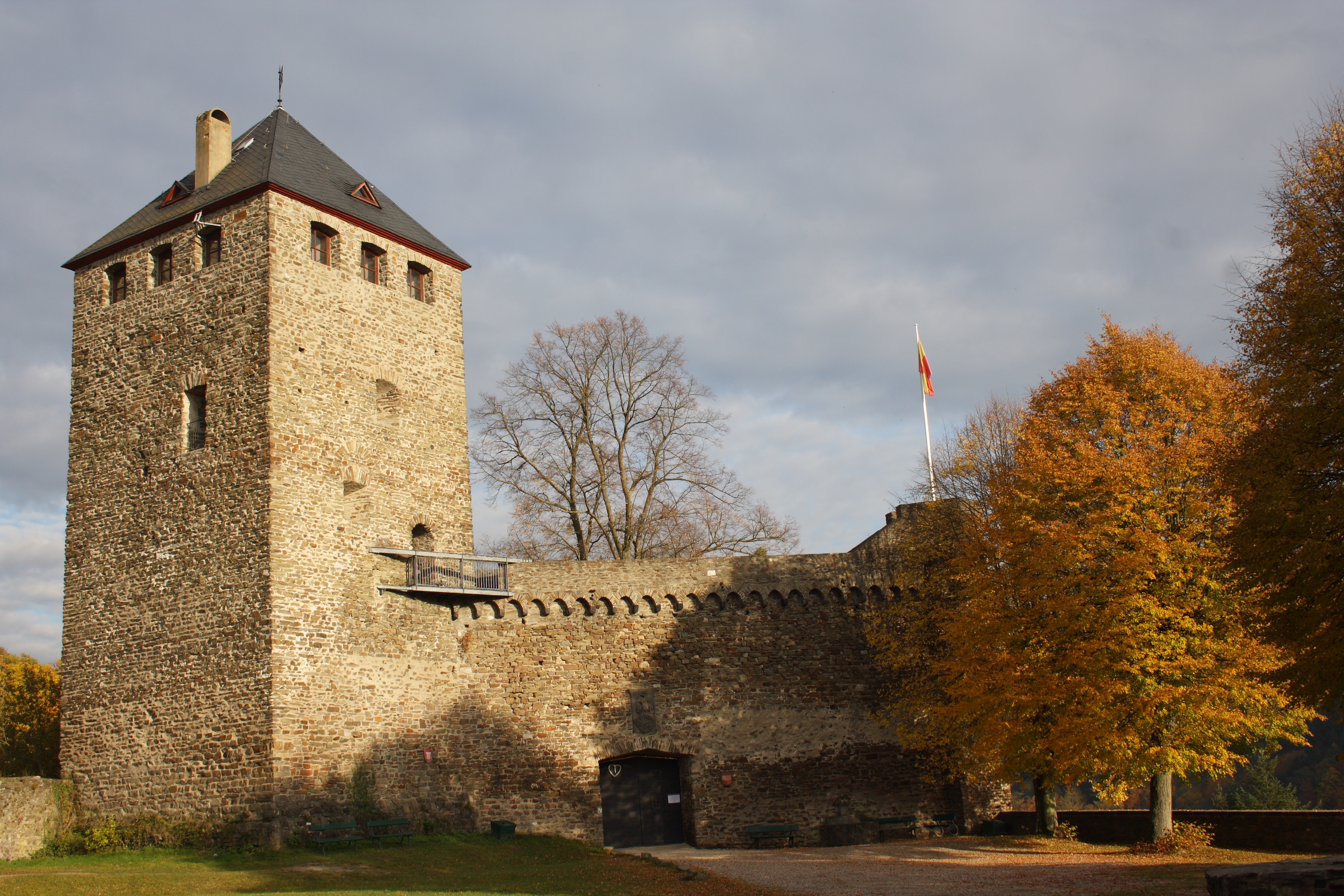
Burg Sayn

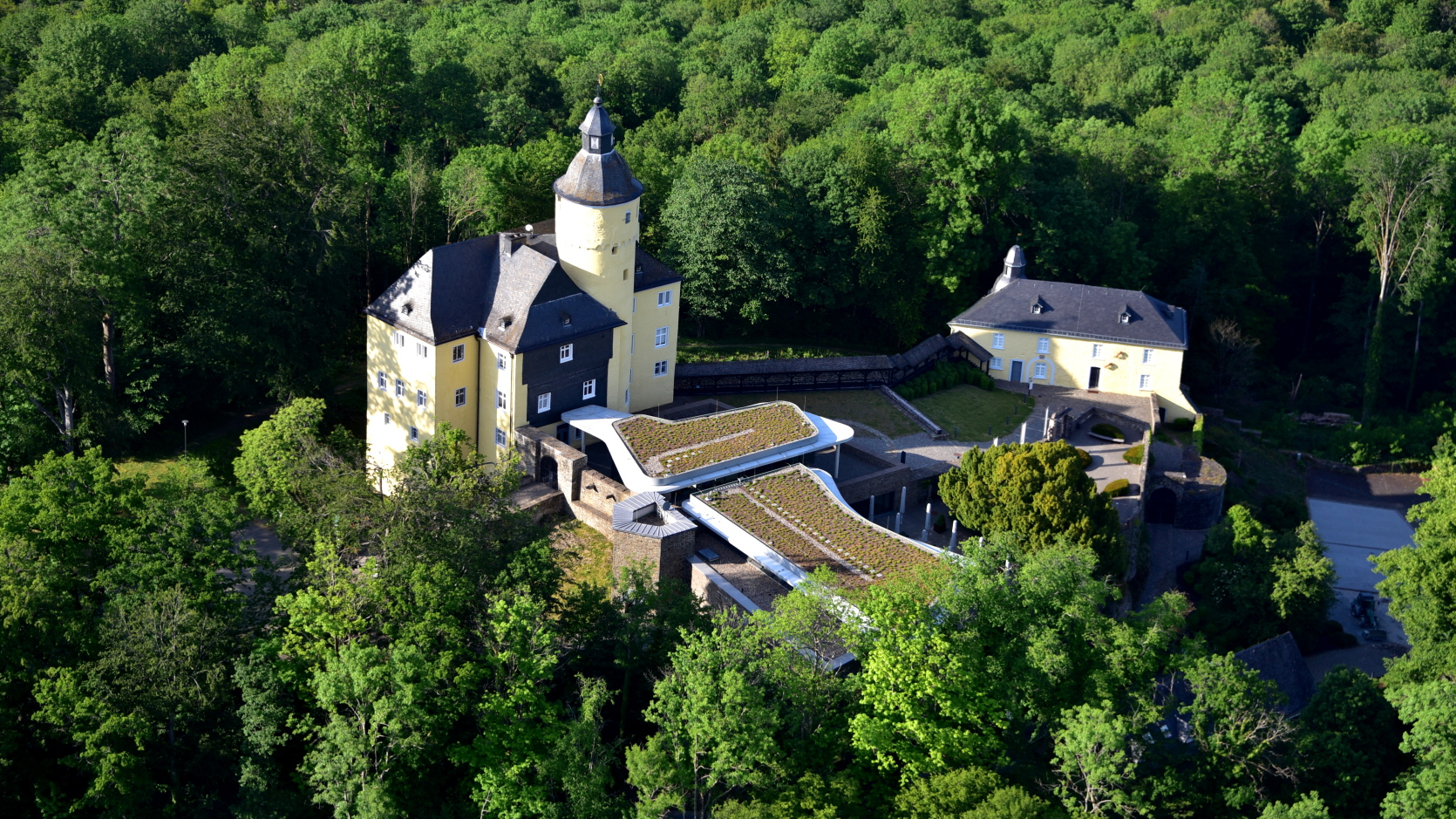
Homburg Castle

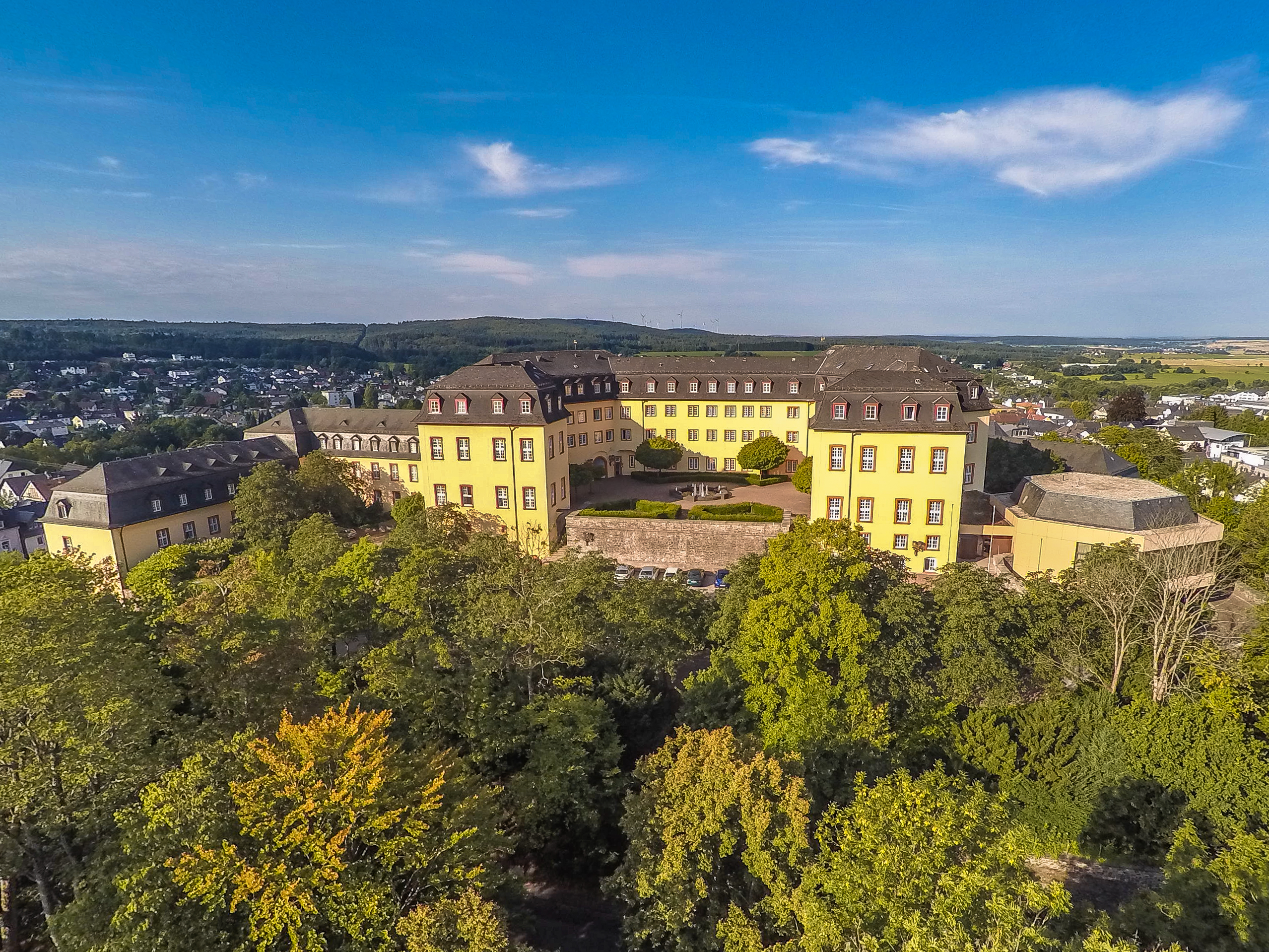
Schloss Hachenburg

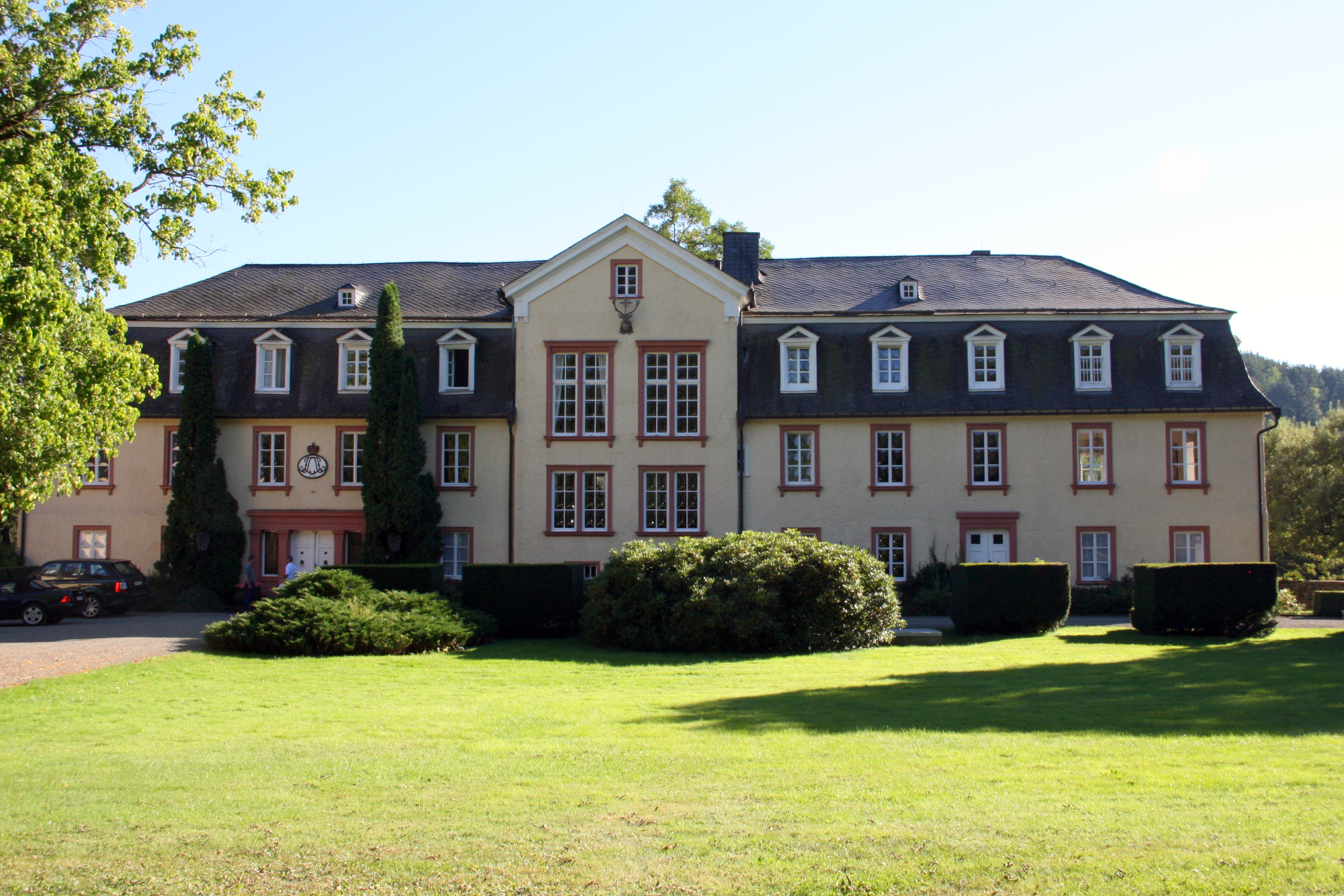
Schwarzenau Castle

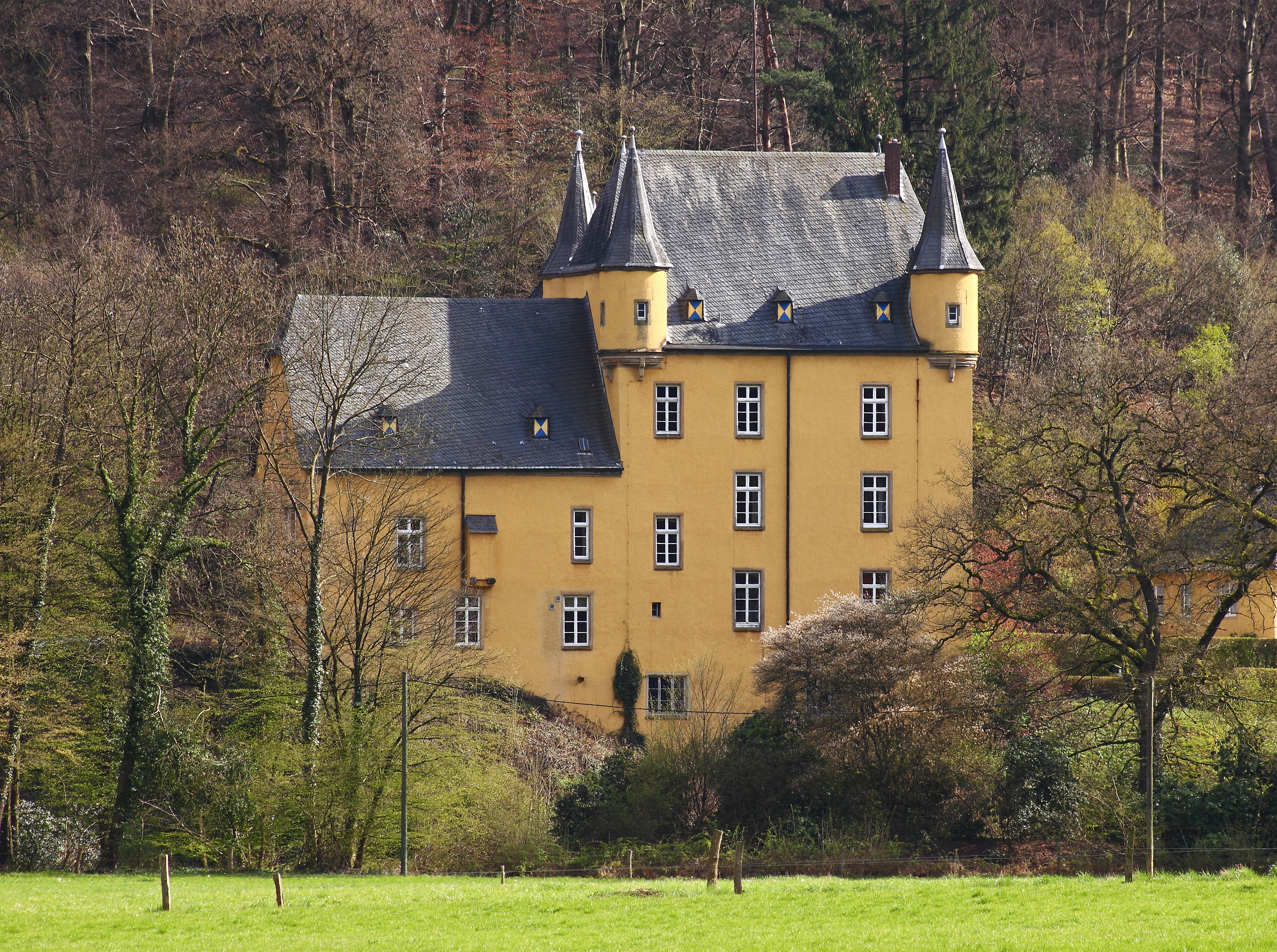
Castle Strauweiler

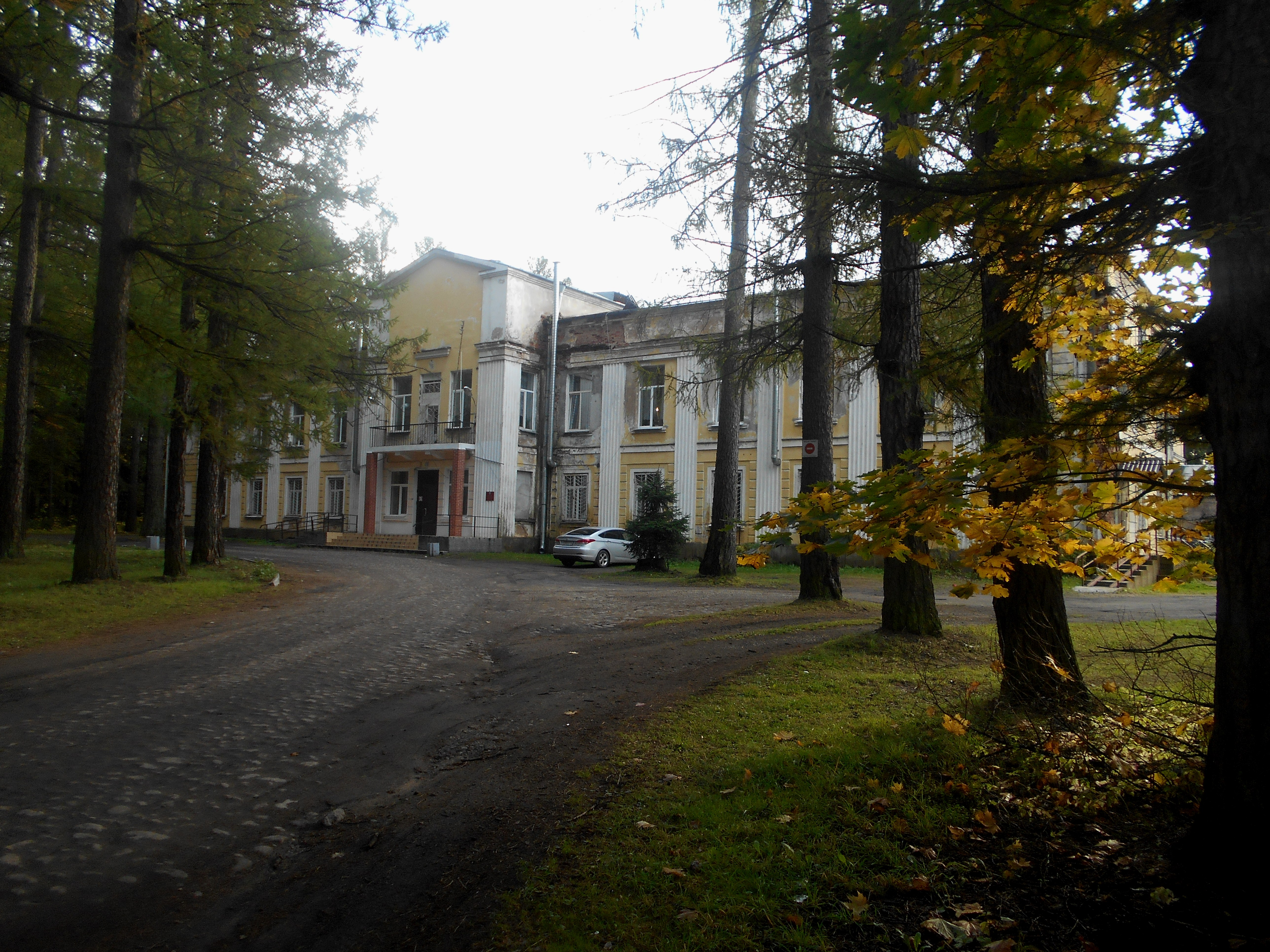
Wittgenstein palace in Druzhnoselye, Gatchinsky District, Russia

== See also ==
- Heinrich Prinz zu Sayn-Wittgenstein
- Sayn-Homburg
- Sayn-Wittgenstein-Wittgenstein
- Sayn-Wittgenstein-Berleburg
- Sayn-Wittgenstein-Hachenburg
- Sayn-Wittgenstein-Hohenstein
- Sayn-Wittgenstein-Karlsburg
- Sayn-Wittgenstein-Ludwigsburg
- Sayn-Wittgenstein-Sayn
- Sayn-Wittgenstein-Sayn-Altenkirchen
- Sayn-Wittgenstein-Vallendar
- Sponheim-Sayn
