= Sophia Louise of Mecklenburg-Schwerin =

Queen in Prussia from 1708 to 1713

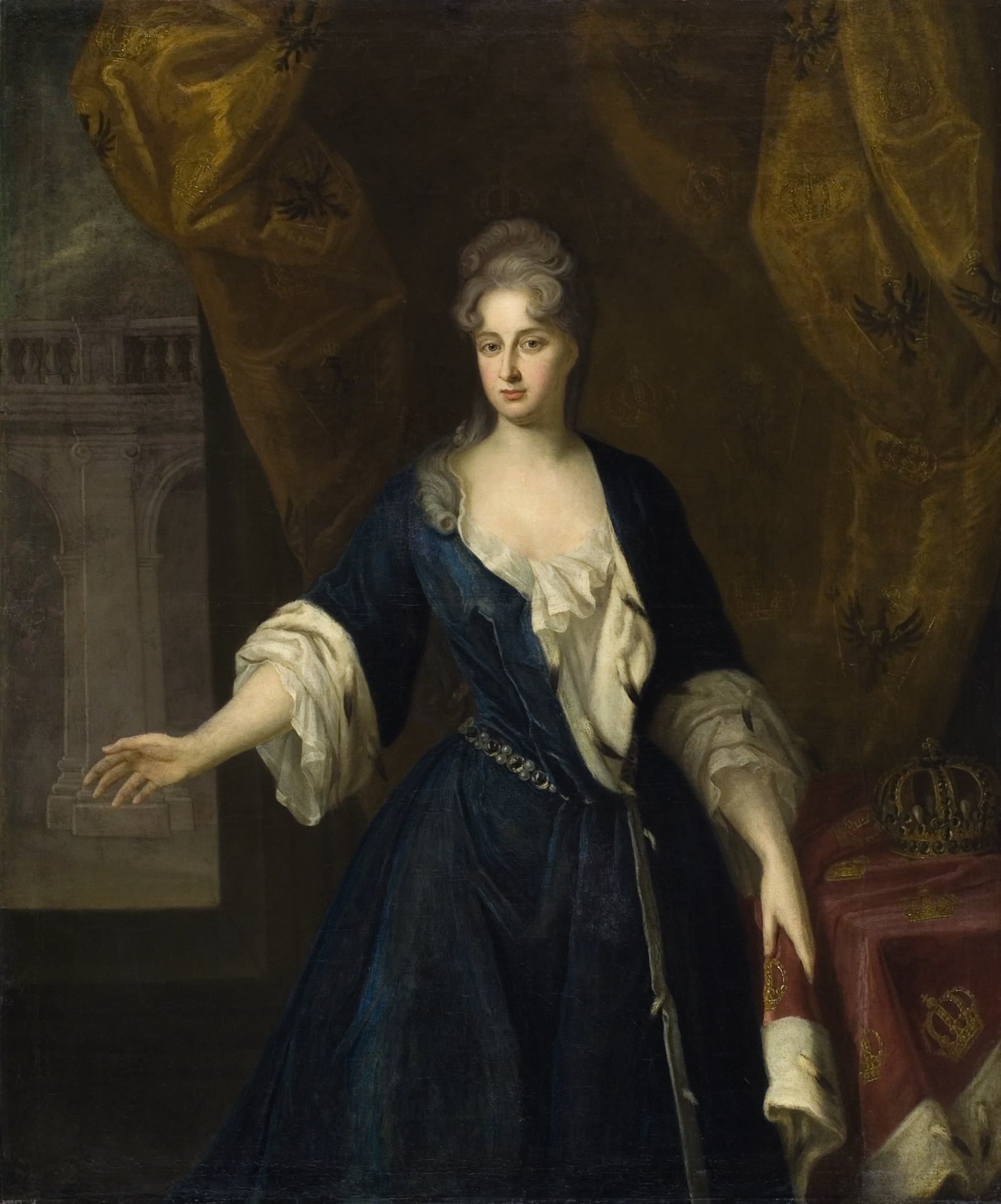
- 1709 portrait

Queen consort in Prussia Electress consort of Brandenburg
- Tenure: 28 November 1708 – 25 February 1713
- Born: 6 May 1685; Grabow Castle
- Died: 29 July 1735 (aged 50); Schwerin Castle, Mecklenburg
- Burial: Schelf Church
- Spouse: Frederick I of Prussia (m. 1708; died 1713)
Names
- Sofie Luise
- House: Mecklenburg-Schwerin
- Father: Frederick I of Mecklenburg-Grabow
- Mother: Christine Wilhelmine of Hesse-Homburg

Sophia Louise of Mecklenburg-Schwerin (Sofie Luise; 6 May 1685 – 29 July 1735) was Queen consort in Prussia by marriage to King Frederick I of Prussia. She was famed for her beauty.

== Life ==
Sophia Louise was the fourth child of Frederick, Duke of Mecklenburg-Grabow, and Princess Christine Wilhelmine of Hesse-Homburg. She was an aunt of Grand Duchess Anna Leopoldovna of Russia, who was herself regent and mother of Emperor Ivan VI of Russia.

Sophia Louise was reportedly of a vivid and extrovert personality and "allowed the utmost liberty as regarded her conduct" by her brother, which had caused some gossip.

Sophia Louise's marriage was arranged by the powerful Prussian Minister President Count Johann Kasimir Kolbe von Wartenberg, who pressured King Frederick to marry for the sake of the succession after he had been widowed for a second time. In 1708, the firstborn son of the crown princess died in infancy, and the physicians expressed doubt that she would be able to conceive again. This was lifted as a reason for the king to marry again, which was successfully suggested to the king during his journey to Karlsbad by his half-sister Maria Amalia, Duchess of Saxe-Zeitz, who had been induced to do so by King's chamberlain Count August David zu Sayn-Wittgenstein-Hohenstein, Foreign minister Heinrich Rüdiger von Ilgen and Cabinet Minister Johann August Marschall von Bieberstein, who wished to balance the growing influence of the crown prince with a queen who owed her position to them.

He was suggested to marry the Princess Wilhelmine of Hessen-Homburg, Princess Charlotte Dorothea of Brandenburg-Bayreuth or the Princess Sofia Hedwig of Nassau-Dietz, later Duchess of Mecklenburg-Schwerin, sister of the Prince of Orange, who was initially favored, but dropped. After this, the king's half sister suggested Duchess Sophia Louise of Mecklenburg-Schwerin, which could strengthen Frederick's claim to the Mecklenburg succession.

A meeting was arranged between Frederick I and Sophia Louise at Ilosenthal, where she was escorted by her mother. The king was pleased with her beauty, and after half an hours conversation, the meeting was discontinued, after which the proposal was formally made to the Duke of Mecklenburg-Schwerin and accepted.

=== Queen ===
In November 1708 she became the third and last spouse of Frederick I of Prussia. The wedding took place by proxy in Mecklenburg with Minister Count August zu Sayn-Wittgenstein-Hohenstein acting in place of the king. The next day she was escorted to the border in the company of her family, and greeted by Frederick I outside Berlin. On the 27th she made her state entry to the capital, followed the next day by the wedding. The wedding was described as magnificent, with the king dressed in gold brocade and the queen with a crown escorted by the crown prince, her brother-in-law and the princesses dressed in silver brocade with streets covered in crimson carpeting. However, shortly before, the king had been informed that his daughter-in-law was pregnant, and answered that had he been aware of this, he would not have married again, which put a damp on the celebrations.

Queen Sophia Louise was not regarded to play her role as queen well at a court where ceremony and representation was given a great part. She had received no education except in French and music, and was not able to replace her brilliantly cultivated predecessor at court, Queen Sophia Charlotte. Her staff was regarded to be ill composed and dominated by the king's Court chamberlain Count August zu Sayn-Wittgenstein-Hohenstein. He selected his wife's sister-in-law, Countess Marie Anna zu Sayn-Wittgenstein-Vallendar, nee Countess von Wiser as Chief of her Maids of honour, and his mother-in-law the Countess Charlotte Luise of Sayn-Wittgenstein-Vallendar, nee Countess zu Leiningen-Dagsburg-Hardenburg as Chief Lady-in-waiting, which was regarded a bad choice. According to Pollnitz her Chief Lady in waiting Charlotte Luise "had never left the depths of Wetterau, save to go to the fair of Frankfurt, where she had contracted all the pride of the Imperial Countesses of the Holy Roman Empire, and though she had the best will in the world to act her part, she was far better fitted to figure at Wetzlar (at the Reichskammergericht), than at Prussian Court". Also, the Queen's chamberlain Count Kurt Christoph von Schwerin was not regarded to be a suitable adviser. Due to all this, Sophia Louise made no friends in her new court and her only confidante was the Lady-in-waiting she brought with her from Mecklenburg, Eleonore von Grävenitz, sister of Wilhelmine von Grävenitz, who became her influential favorite and adviser.

Sophia Louise was not equal to the intrigues of the Berlin court. She came in conflict with Countess Catharina von Wartenberg, who was both wife of Count Johann Kasimir Kolbe von Wartenberg, the first Minister President of Prussia and the king's mistress. One incident was particularly known. During an absence by the king at the Jahr Markt at Leipzig in 1710, the queen summoned the ladies at court to assist her embroidering a gift for the king, among them Countess Catharina. During this, they were interrupted by the valet of Catharina, bringing her coffee, which was a great offence to etiquette, and when the queen commanded Catharina to leave, she commented: "I think I see myself doing so", with a laugh, which added to the etiquette offence and infuriated the queen so that she ordered Catharina to be thrown out of the window; before anyone could be found to do so, she hastily left. The queen complained to the king, who ordered Countess von Wartenberg to apologize, which she consented to, though she managed to avoid doing so.

Sophia Louise made a great impression upon her marriage and became known as the "Venus of Mecklenburg", and initially, the king was charmed by her beauty and her original extrovert vivacity. However, aware of the fact that the liberty she had enjoyed at her brother's court had caused gossip about her, she took the advice from Eleonore von Gravenitz to take on a dignified gravity of manner and adherence to religion, which repelled the king, who was himself of an extrovert character and saw her behavior as coldness. Her Lutheran confessor Porst introduced her to Pietist August Hermann Francke, under whose guidance Sophie Louise grew more serious and strict in her manner, spending her time in a routine of prayers and sermons, managed a court which according to Pollnitz likened to a convent, and was regarded to neglect her representational and social duties as the first lady of the court and female role model. Sophia Louise, along with Eleonore von Graevenitz, made attempts to convince Frederick to convert from Calvinism to the Lutheran faith. The king regularly paid her attention during the first years and did not object to her religious obsessions, but during a heated religious discussion she openly stated that none of the Reformed faith could hope for salvation, upon which the king asked: "Then after my death you could not speak of me as the Late King of blessed memory?", upon which she answered: "I would say, 'the dear departed King.'" This incident caused the king to exile Mademoiselle von Gravenitz, Francke and admonish Porst, and after this, he seldom visited her in her apartments and seldom saw her as she preferred not to participate in court life and lived in retirement in her rooms. After this de facto separation from the king, loss of her closest friends and her retirement from court life, Sophia Louisa reportedly became obsessed by religious theology to the point of mania and fell in to depression and mental derangement. Eventually, she periodically lost her ability to control herself and, experienced violent fits, a circumstance her attendants long concealed from the king.

During the long illness of the king, which after months eventually caused his death, an incident occurred which made the king aware of the queen's mental state. One night the queen, dressed only in her white nightclothes and with loose hair, rushed through the gallery which connected her apartments with those of the king, burst through the glass door in to his room and, covered in blood from the wounds inflicted by the broken glass door, attacked the king and screamed reproaches at him. The suddenly awakened king, who suffered from fever, imagined in his confusion that she was the legendary "White Lady" who would foretell his death, and screamed until his attendants appeared, causing a scene. Sophia Louise was reportedly not aware of what she had done.

=== Later life ===
In January 1713, only a few weeks before his death, Frederick sent her back to her family in Mecklenburg-Schwerin. Sophia Louise was described as "helpless, mindless, and melancholy, but once more gentle and calm".

From then on she lived in the residence of her widowed mother at Grabow castle. On her death she was buried in the Schelfkirche St. Nikolai in Schwerin.

== Legacy ==
The Sophienkirche in Berlin is named after her.

Sophia Louise of Mecklenburg-Schwerin House of Mecklenburg-Schwerin Cadet branch of the House of Mecklenburg Born: 6 May 1685 Died: 21 January 1735
German royalty
Vacant Title last held by Sophia Charlotte of Hanover	Queen consort in Prussia; 28 November 1708 – 25 February 1713	Succeeded by Sophia Dorothea of Hanover
Vacant Title last held by Sophia Charlotte of Hanover	Electress consort of Brandenburg; 28 November 1708 – 25 February 1713	Succeeded by Sophia Dorothea of Hanover
Vacant Title last held by Anne Geneviève de Bourbon	Princess consort of Neuchâtel; 28 November 1708 – 25 February 1713	Succeeded by Sophia Dorothea of Hanover
Vacant Title last held by Sophia Charlotte of Hanover	Princess consort of Orange (disputed); 28 November 1708 – 25 February 1713	Succeeded by Sophia Dorothea of Hanover
