= Johannetta of Sayn-Wittgenstein (1561–1622) =

German countess

- Born: 15 February 1561
- Died: 13 April 1622 (aged 61)
- Noble family: House of Sayn
- Spouse: John VI, Count of Nassau-Dillenburg
- Father: Louis I, Count of Sayn-Wittgenstein
- Mother: Anna of Solms-Braunfels

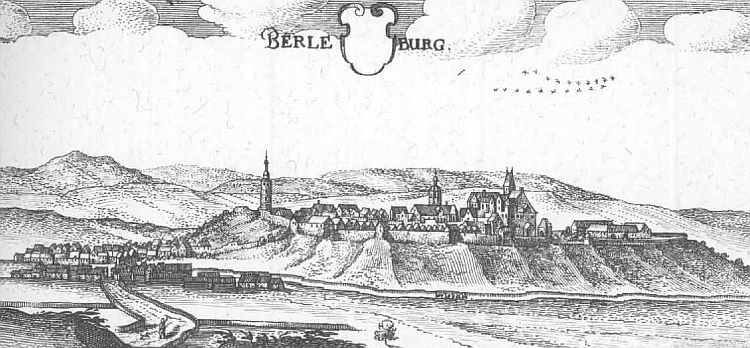
Berleburg in 17th century.

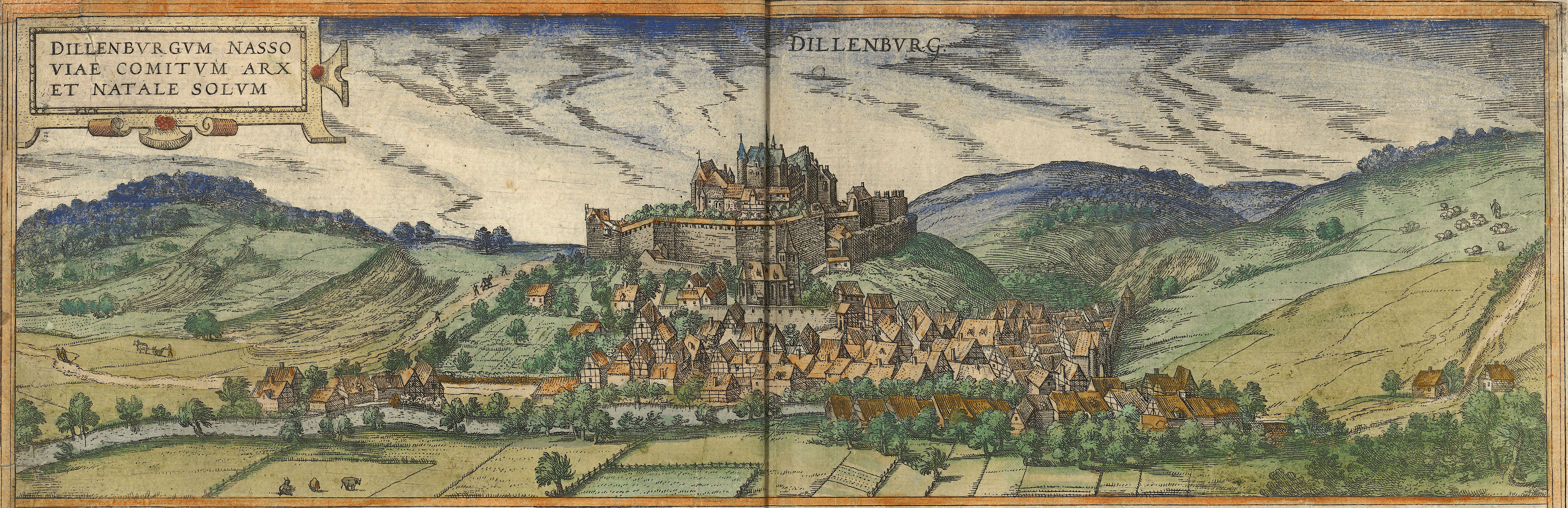
Dillenburg in 1575, showing the old castle at the top of the hill and the St. Johanniskirche below it

Johanetta of Sayn-Wittgenstein (15 February 1561 – 13 April 1622) was a German countess of the house of Sayn-Wittgenstein, who became the third wife of Count John VI, Count of Nassau-Dillenburg.

== Live ==
Johanetta was born in 1561, the first child of Count Louis I, Count of Sayn-Wittgenstein (1532–1605) and his first wife, Anna of Solms-Braunfels (1538–1565). Anna was a relative of the later Amalia of Solms-Braunfels (1602–1675). She was most likely named after her grandmother Johannetta of Isenburg-Neumagen (1500–1563), daughter of Salentin VII, lord of Isenburg and Neumagen (1462–1533).

Her father was raised in Wittgenstein Castle, near Bad Laasphe. After his marriage he and his family settled in a Castle in the country near the city of Berleburg. Her mother gave birth to two more children, Juliana in 1562 and George II in 1565, before she died in 1565.

Her father Louis I remarried Elisabeth of Solms-Laubach (1549–1599), daughter of Frederick Magnus I, Count of Solms-Laubach. She gave birth to another 19 children, of which some died young. They grew up at the ancestral Wittgenstein Castle on a hilltop overlooking Bad Laasphe to a former hunting lodge near Berleburg.

In 1586 at the 14th of June at Dillenburg Castle at the age of 25 she married Count John VI, the eldest son of William the Rich and Juliana of Stolberg, who was 50 years old by then.

=== Family ===
John and Johanetta had the following children:

1. George Louis (12 April 1588 – 16 April 1588).
2. Prince John Louis of Nassau-Hadamar (6 August 1590 – 10 March 1653).
3. Johannette Elisabeth (13 February 1593 – 13 September 1654), married on 16 December 1616 to Count Conrad Gumprecht of Bentheim-Limburg.
4. Anna (24 November 1594 – 11 February 1660), married on 19 June 1619 to Count Philip Ernest of Isenburg-Birstein.
5. Magdalene (13 November 1595 – 31 July 1633), married on 29 May 1624 to Count George Albert I of Erbach.
6. Anna Amalie (19 July 1599 – 4 May 1667), married on 25 November 1648 to Count William Otto of Isenburg-Birstein.
7. Juliane (9 June 1602 – 26 August 1602).
