= Frederick I of Prussia =

Ruler of Brandenburg–Prussia from 1688 to 1713

Frederick I
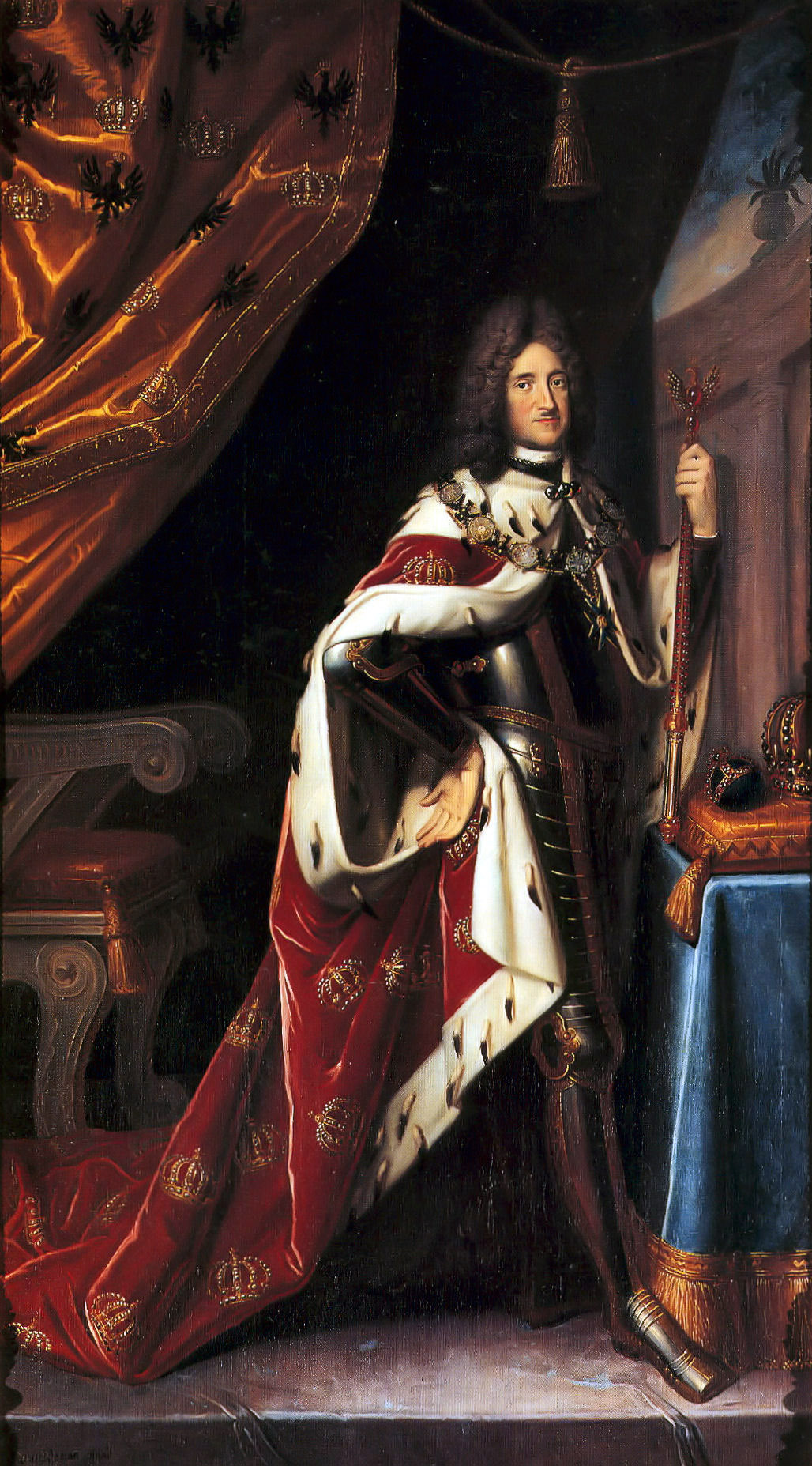

King in Prussia Elector of Brandenburg
- Reign: 18 January 1701 – 25 February 1713
- Coronation: 18 January 1701; Schlosskirche, Königsberg
- Successor: Frederick William I

Duke of Prussia Elector of Brandenburg
- Reign: 29 April 1688 – 18 January 1701
- Predecessor: Frederick William
- Born: 11 July 1657; Königsberg, Brandenburg–Prussia
- Died: 25 February 1713 (aged 55); Berlin, Kingdom of Prussia, Holy Roman Empire
- Burial: Berlin Cathedral
- Spouses: Elizabeth Henrietta of Hesse-Kassel (m. 1679; died 1683) Sophia Charlotte of Hanover (m. 1684; died 1705) Sophia Louise of Mecklenburg-Schwerin (m. 1708)
- Issue: Luise, Hereditary Princess of Hesse-Kassel; Prince Frederick August; Frederick William I
- House: Hohenzollern
- Father: Frederick William, Elector of Brandenburg
- Mother: Louise Henriette of Orange-Nassau
- Religion: Calvinist

Frederick I (German: Friedrich I.; 11 July 1657 – 25 February 1713), of the Hohenzollern dynasty, was (as Frederick III) Elector of Brandenburg (1688–1713) and Duke of Prussia in personal union (Brandenburg–Prussia). The latter function he upgraded to royalty, becoming the first King in Prussia (1701–1713). From 1707 he was also Prince of Neuchâtel.

== Early life ==
Born in Königsberg, Frederick was the third son of Frederick William, Elector of Brandenburg by his father's first marriage to Louise Henriette of Orange-Nassau, eldest daughter of Frederick Henry, Prince of Orange and Amalia of Solms-Braunfels. His maternal cousin was King William III of England. Upon the death of his father on 29 April 1688, Frederick became Elector Frederick III of Brandenburg and Duke of Prussia. Right after ascending the throne Frederick founded a new city southerly adjacent to Dorotheenstadt and named it after himself, the Friedrichstadt.

== Military career ==
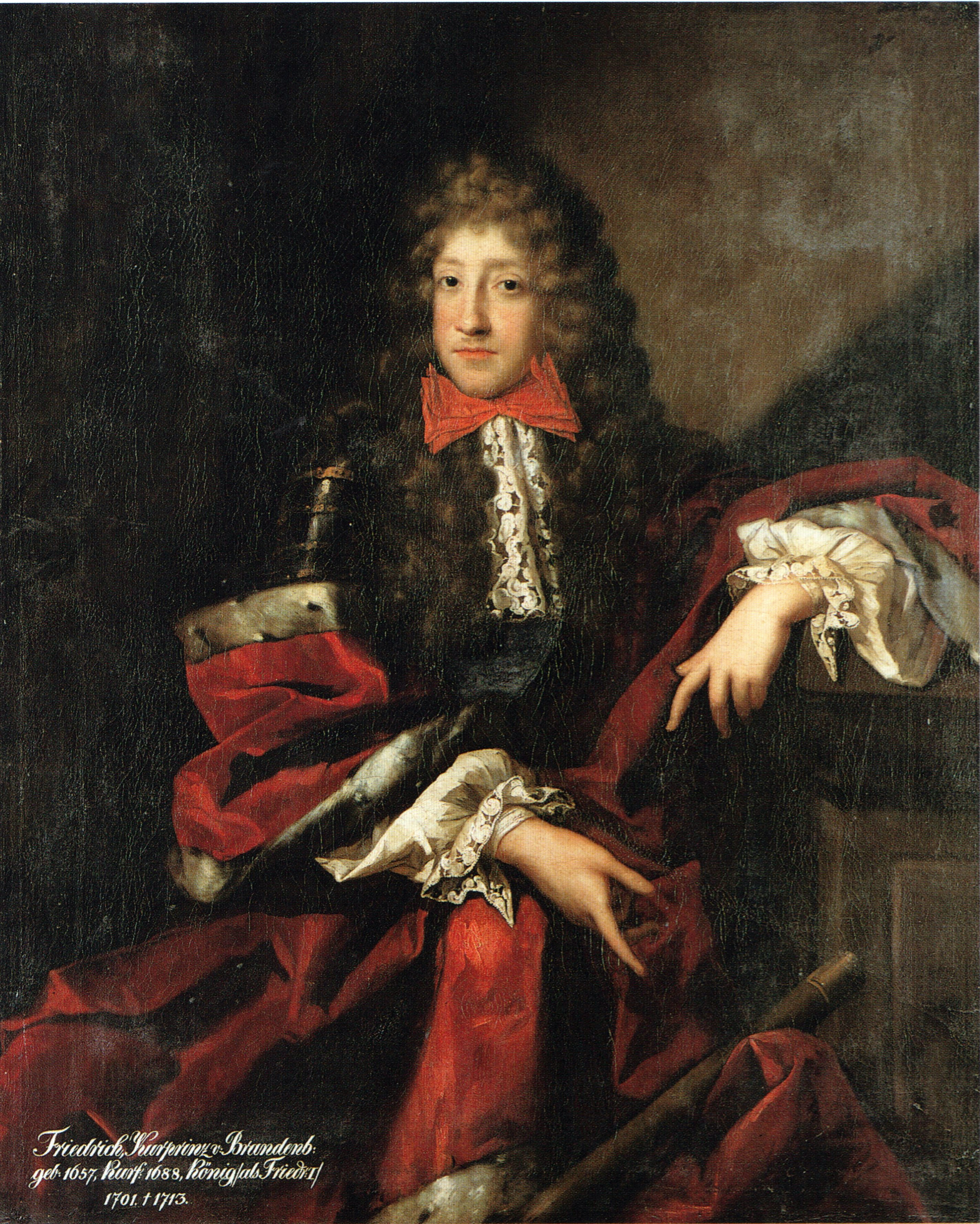
Portrait by Adam de Clerck, 1685

Frederick was noted for his opposition to France, in contrast to his father who had sought an alliance with Louis XIV. Frederick took Brandenburg into the League of Augsburg against France and in 1689 led military forces into the field as part of the allied coalition. That year an army under his command besieged and captured Bonn. Despite this opposition to France (a characteristic that was even more prominent in his son and heir) he was fond of French culture, and styled his court in imitation of that of Louis XIV.

== Reign as king ==
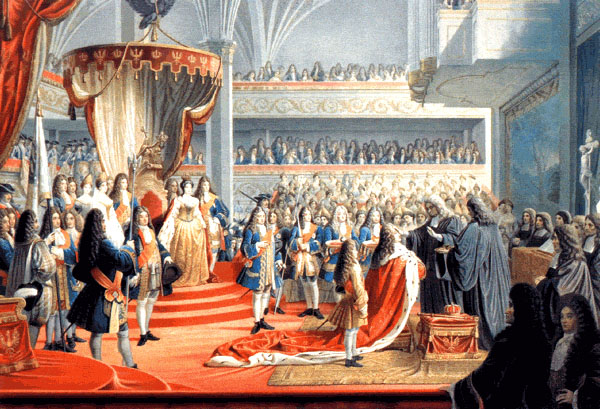
Coronation of Frederick as King in Prussia at Königsberg Castle in 1701

The Hohenzollern state was then known as Brandenburg-Prussia. The family's main possessions were the Margraviate of Brandenburg within the Holy Roman Empire and the Duchy of Prussia outside of the Empire, ruled as a personal union. Although he was the Margrave and Prince-elector of Brandenburg and the Duke of Prussia, Frederick desired the more prestigious title of king. However, according to Germanic law at that time, no kingdoms could exist within the Holy Roman Empire, with the exception of the Kingdom of Bohemia which belonged to the Holy Roman Emperor.

Frederick persuaded Emperor Leopold I to allow Prussia to be elevated to a kingdom by the Crown Treaty of 16 November 1700. This agreement was ostensibly given in exchange for an alliance against King Louis XIV in the War of the Spanish Succession and the provision of 8,000 Prussian troops to Leopold's service. Frederick argued that Prussia had never been part of the Holy Roman Empire, and he ruled over it with full sovereignty. Therefore, he said, there was no legal or political barrier to letting him rule it as a kingdom. Frederick was aided in the negotiations by Charles Ancillon.

Frederick crowned himself on 18 January 1701 in Königsberg. Although he did so with the Emperor's consent, and also with formal acknowledgement from Augustus II the Strong, Elector of Saxony, who held the title of King of Poland, the Sejm of the Polish–Lithuanian Commonwealth raised objections, and viewed the coronation as illegal. In fact, according to the terms of the Treaty of Wehlau and Bromberg, the House of Hohenzollern's sovereignty over the Duchy of Prussia was not absolute but contingent on the continuation of the male line (in the absence of which the duchy would revert to the Polish crown). Therefore, out of deference to the region's historic ties to the Polish crown, Frederick made the symbolic concession of calling himself "King in Prussia" instead of "King of Prussia".

Frederick leveraged the recognizance of other nations to attempt to construct the legitimacy of his assumed royal title. In this, the English were his most willing diplomatic allies. They first sent an envoy to Berlin, who conformed to the new royal protocol. Thereafter, they sent an ambassador to Berlin, who ceremonially recognised Frederick as king. In exchange, Frederick provided England with troops during the War of the Spanish Succession, though he often withheld these until he received the ceremonial concessions he desired.

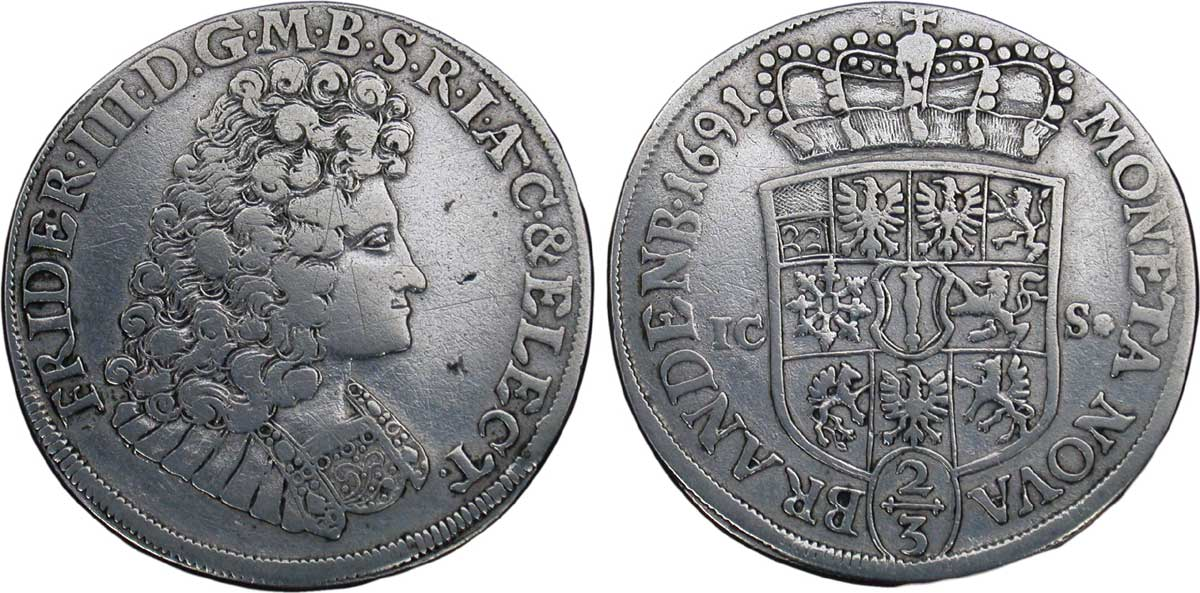
Frederick I on a coin from 1691

His royalty was, in any case, limited to Prussia and did not reduce the rights of the Emperor in the portions of his domains that were still part of the Holy Roman Empire. In other words, while he was a king in Prussia, he was still only an elector under the suzerainty of the Holy Roman Emperor in Brandenburg. Legally, the Hohenzollern state was still a personal union between Brandenburg and Prussia. However, by the time Frederick crowned himself as king, the emperor's authority over Brandenburg (and the rest of the empire) was only nominal, and in practice it soon came to be treated as part of the Prussian kingdom rather than as a separate entity. His grandson, Frederick the Great, was the first Prussian king formally to style himself "King of Prussia" (from 1772 onwards).

Frederick was a patron of the arts and learning. The Prussian Academy of Arts in Berlin was founded by Frederick in 1696, as was the Academy of Sciences in 1700, though the latter was closed down by his son as an economic measure; it was reopened in 1740 by his grandson, Frederick II. Frederick also appointed Jacob Paul von Gundling as Professor of History and Law at the Berlin Knights Academy in 1705, and as historian at the Higher Herald's Office in 1706.

Frederick died in Berlin in 1713 and is entombed in the Berlin Cathedral.

His grandson, Frederick the Great, referred to Frederick I as "the mercenary king", due to the fact that he greatly profited from the hiring of his Prussian troops to defend other territories, such as in northern Italy against the French. "All in all," he wrote of his grandfather, "he was great in small matters, and small in great matters."

== Marriages and children ==
Frederick was married three times:

First, in 1679, to Elizabeth Henrietta of Hesse-Kassel (1661–1683), with whom he had one child,

- Louise Dorothea, born 1680, who died without issue at age 25.

Then to Sophia Charlotte of Hanover (1668–1705), with whom he had

- Frederick August (6 October 1685 – 31 January 1686) died in infancy.
- Frederick William I, born in 1688, who succeeded him.

In 1708, he married Sophia Louise of Mecklenburg-Schwerin, who survived him but had no children with him.

He also had an official mistress, Catharina von Wartenberg, between 1696 and 1711. However, he was never known to make use of her services, being deeply in love with his second wife.

== Ancestry ==
Ancestors of Frederick I of Prussia

8. John Sigismund, Elector of Brandenburg
4. George William, Elector of Brandenburg
9. Anna of Prussia
2. Frederick William, Elector of Brandenburg
10. Frederick IV, Elector Palatine
5. Elizabeth Charlotte of the Palatinate
11. Louise Juliana of Orange-Nassau
1. Frederick I of Prussia
12. William I, Prince of Orange
6. Frederick Henry, Prince of Orange
13. Louise de Coligny
3. Louise Henriette of Orange-Nassau
14. Johann Albrecht I, Count of Solms-Braunfels
7. Amalia of Solms-Braunfels
15. Agnes of Sayn-Wittgenstein

== Notes ==
Frederick I of Prussia House of Hohenzollern Born: 11 July 1657 Died: 25 February 1713
Regnal titles
Preceded by Frederick William	Duke of Prussia; 1688–1701	Elevation to Kingdom
Preceded by Frederick William	Elector of Brandenburg as Frederick III; 1688–1713	Succeeded by Frederick William I
New title	King in Prussia; 1701–1713	Succeeded by Frederick William I
Preceded by Marie	Prince of Neuchâtel as Frederick I 1707–1713	Succeeded by Frederick William I
Preceded by William III	Prince of Orange (disputed); 1702–1713	Succeeded by Frederick William I
