= Sayn-Wittgenstein-Wittgenstein =

European polity

Coordinates: 50°55′N 8°24′E

County of Sayn-Wittgenstein-Wittgenstein Grafschaft Sayn-Wittgenstein-Wittgenstein
- 1607–1657
- Coat of arms
- Status: State of the Holy Roman Empire
- Capital: Wittgenstein Castle
- Government: Principality
- Historical era: Middle Ages
  - Partitioned from Sayn-Wittgenstein: 1607
  - Partitioned in twain: 1657
Preceded by	Succeeded by
Sayn-Wittgenstein	Sayn-Wittgenstein-Hohenstein; Sayn-Wittgenstein-Vallendar

Coat of arms of the County of Sayn-Wittgenstein-Wittgenstein

Sayn-Wittgenstein-Wittgenstein was a county of the Sauerland of Germany. Sayn-Wittgenstein-Wittgenstein was a partition of Sayn-Wittgenstein, comprising the southern portion of the Wittgenstein County. It came into existence after the death of count Louis the Elder in 1605. In 1657, it was partitioned into Sayn-Wittgenstein-Hohenstein and Sayn-Wittgenstein-Vallendar.

== Counts of Sayn-Wittgenstein-Wittgenstein (1607–1657) ==
- Louis II (1607–34)
- John (1634–57)

== Properties ==
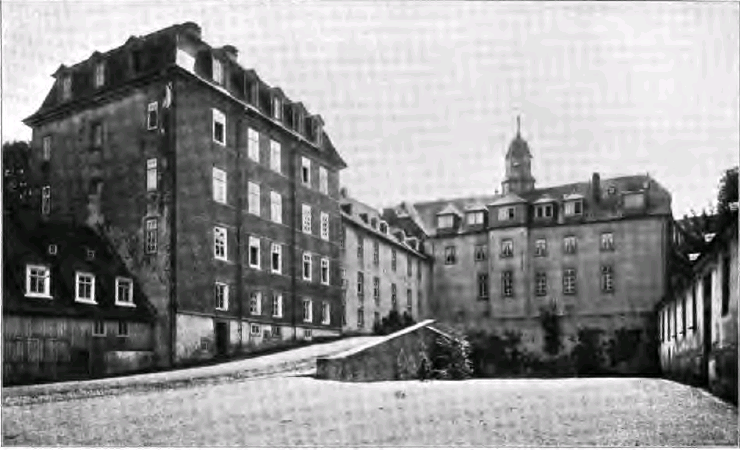
Wittgenstein Castle (near Bad Laasphe) in 1903

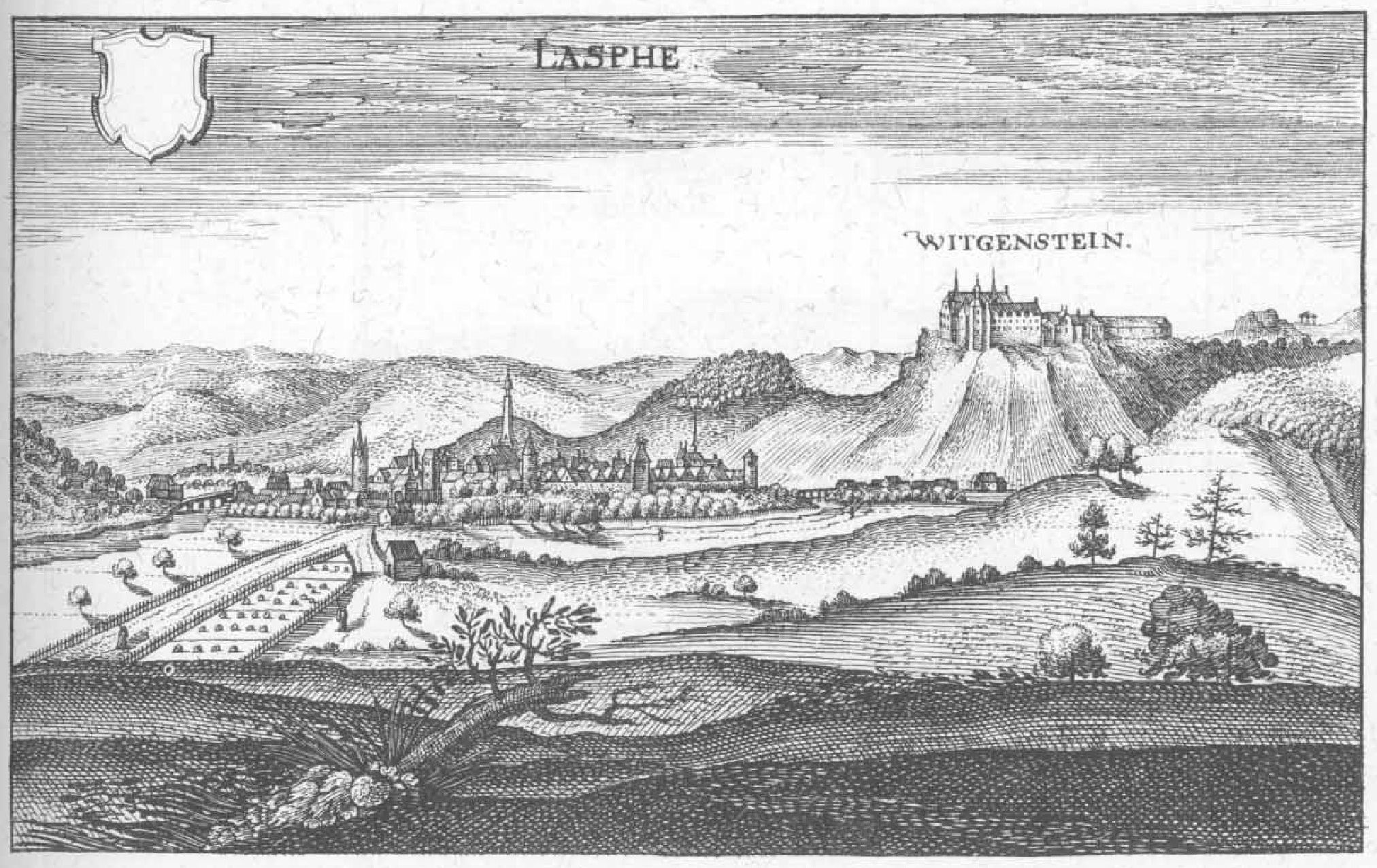
Laasphe and Wittgenstein Castle in 1655
