= David Ancillon =

French Huguenot theologian

David Ancillon (17 March 1617 in Metz – 3 September 1692) was a French Huguenot pastor and author.

At sixteen, he went to Geneva to study theology and, in 1641, was appointed minister of Meaux. In 1653, he accepted a post in his native Metz. The revocation of the Edict of Nantes in 1685 compelled him to move to Frankfort. He then moved to Hanau and then Berlin, where he died on 3 September 1692. He was the father of Charles Ancillon.

== Biography ==
Son of a lawyer, David Ancillon was born in Metz. This French city was under the protection of the King of France Louis XIII. He came from a line of notable Protestants, who were established in the Lorraine region.

When he was only 9 years old, young David was sent to Jesuits's college. The Jesuits quickly noticed the oratorical and erudite qualities of the boy and tried several times, though without success, to convert him to Catholicism.

David Ancillon left to study Protestant theology in Geneva in 1633. In 1641, at the synod of Charenton, he was received as a minister and installed in Meaux.
