= Charles Ancillon =

French jurist and diplomat

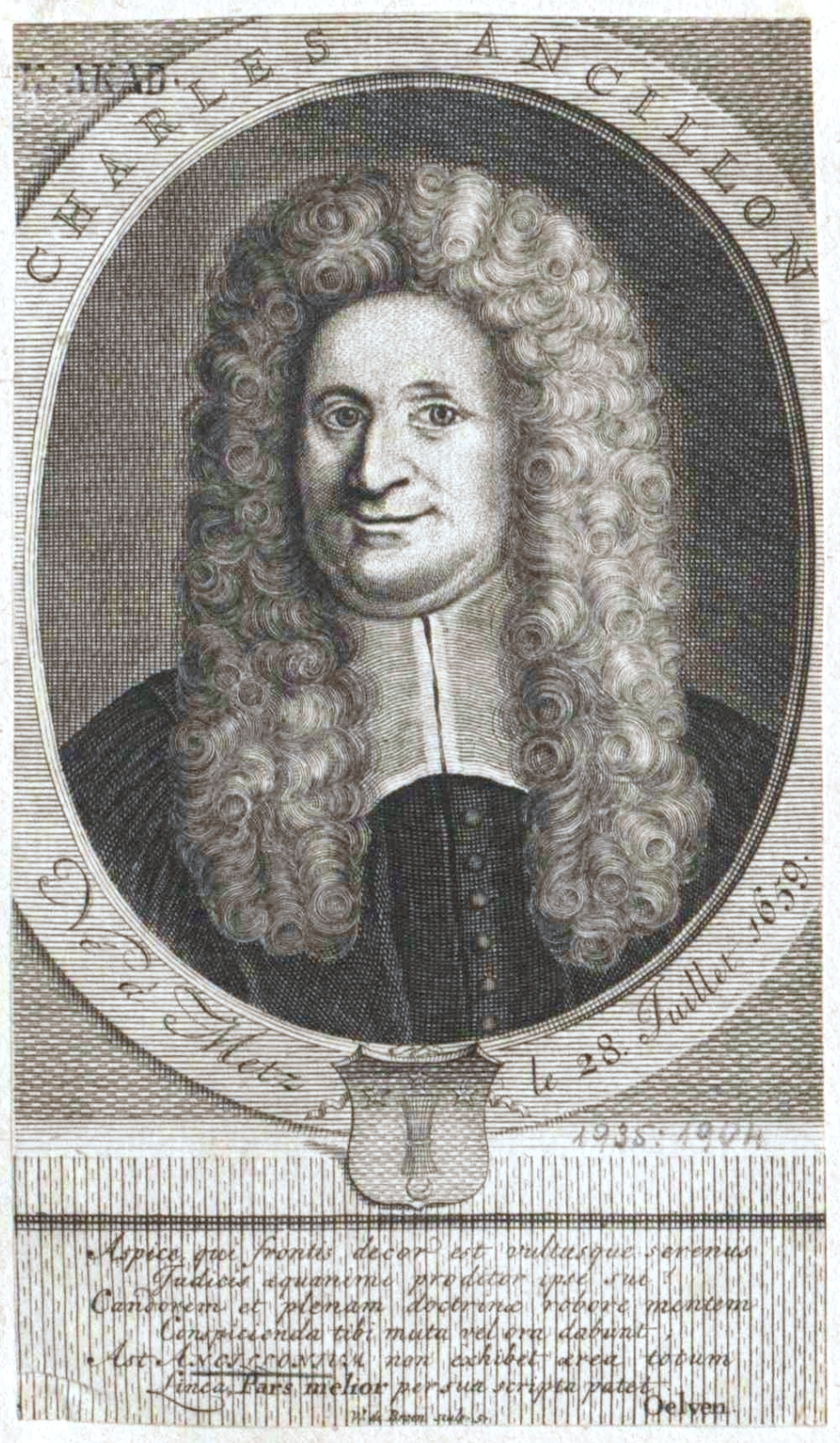
- Born: 28 July 1659; Metz, Three Bishoprics, France
- Died: 5 July 1715 (aged 55); Berlin, Kingdom of Prussia
- Occupations: Diplomat; Jurist; Educator

Charles Ancillon (28 July 1659 – 5 July 1715) was a French jurist and diplomat.

== Life ==
Ancillon was born in Metz into a distinguished family of Huguenots. His father, David Ancillon (1617–1692), was obliged to leave France on the revocation of the Edict of Nantes, and became pastor of the French Protestant community in Berlin.

Ancillon studied law at Marburg, Geneva and Paris, where he was called to the bar. At the request of the Huguenots at Metz, he pleaded its cause at the court of King Louis XIV, urging that it should be excepted in the revocation of the Edict of Nantes, but his efforts were unsuccessful, and he joined his father in Berlin. He was at once appointed by Elector Frederick III "juge et directeur de colonie de Berlin." He also became the first headmaster of Französisches Gymnasium Berlin. Before this, he had published several works on the revocation of the Edict of Nantes and its consequences, but his literary capacity was mediocre, his style stiff and cold, and it was his personal character rather than his reputation as a writer that earned him the confidence of the elector.

In 1687 Ancillon was appointed head of the so-called Academie des nobles, the principal educational establishment of the state; later on, as councillor of embassy, he took part in the negotiations which led to the assumption of the title of "King in Prussia" by the elector. In 1699 he succeeded Samuel Pufendorf as historiographer to the elector, and the same year replaced his uncle Joseph Ancillon as judge of all the French refugees in the Margraviate of Brandenburg.

Ancillon is mainly remembered for what he did for education in Brandenburg-Prussia, and the share he took, in co-operation with Gottfried Leibniz, in founding the Academy of Berlin. Of his fairly numerous works the most valued is the "Histoire de l'etablissement des Francais refugies dans les etats de Brandebourg" published in Berlin in 1690.

== Family ==
- Friedrich Ancillon, his grandson, a Prussian historian and statesman
