= Friedrich Ancillon =

Prussian statesman (1767–1837)

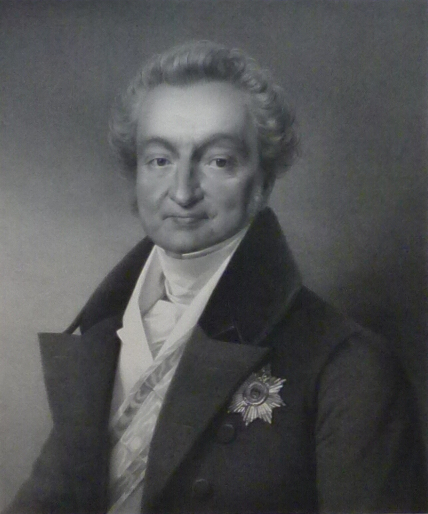

Foreign minister of Prussia
- In office 10 May 1832 – 19 April 1837
- Monarch: Frederick William III
- Preceded by: Christian Günther von Bernstorff
- Succeeded by: Heinrich Wilhelm von Werther

Personal details
- Born: 30 April 1767 Berlin, Kingdom of Prussia
- Died: 19 April 1837 (aged 69) Berlin, Kingdom of Prussia

Johann Peter Friedrich Ancillon (30 April 1767 – 19 April 1837) was a Prussian historian and statesman. He provided Frederick William III of Prussia with strong ideological support against political reforms that might restrain monarchical power.

He was appointed extraordinary member of the Philosophy Class at the Prussian Academy in 1803. He tutored the Crown Prince who became Frederick William IV of Prussia. 1813 till 1837 Ancillon worked as Minister of Foreign Affairs of Prussia, and he tended to support Klemens von Metternich.

== Early life ==
Ancillon was born in Berlin, Kingdom of Prussia, and was the great-grandson of French jurist and diplomat Charles Ancillon. After studying theology at Geneva University, he was appointed minister to the French community in Berlin.

== Career ==
At the same time, his reputation as a historical scholar secured him the post of professor of history at the military academy. In 1793, he visited Switzerland, and in 1796 France, publishing the impressions gathered during his travels in a series of articles which he afterwards collected under the title of Mélanges de littérature et de philosophie (1801).

Ancillon took rank among the most famous historians of his day by his next work, Tableau des révolutions du système politique de l'Europe depuis le XV^{e} siècle (1803, 4 volumes), which gained him the praise of the Institute of France, and admission to the Military Academy of Berlin. It was the first attempt to recognize psychological factors in historical movements, but otherwise its importance was exaggerated. Its "sugary optimism, unctuous phraseology and pulpit logic" appealed, however, to the reviving pietism of the age succeeding the Revolution, and these qualities, as well as his eloquence as a preacher, brought Ancillon to the notice of the court. In 1808 he was appointed tutor to the royal princes, in 1809 councillor of state in the department of religion, and in 1810 tutor of the crown prince (afterwards Frederick William IV of Prussia), on whose sensitive and dreamy nature he was to exercise a powerful but far from wholesome influence.

In October 1814, when his pupil came of age, Ancillon was included by Karl August von Hardenberg in the ministry, as privy councillor of legation in the department of foreign affairs, with a view to utilizing his supposed gifts as a philosophical historian in the preparation of the projected Prussian constitution. But Ancillon's reputed liberalism was of too invertebrate a type to survive the trial of actual contact with affairs. The practical difficulty of the constitutional problem gave the "court parson", as August von Gneisenau had contemptuously called him, excuse enough for a change of front which, incidentally, would please his exalted patrons. He covered his defection from Hardenberg's liberal constitutionalism by a series of "philosophical" treatises on the nature of the state and of man, and became the soul of the reactionary movement at the Berlin court, and the faithful henchman of Klemens von Metternich in the general politics of Germany and of Europe.

In 1817 Ancillon became a councillor of state, and in 1818 director of the political section of the ministry for foreign affairs under Count Bernstorff. In his chief's most important work, the establishment of the Prussian Zollverein, Ancillon had no share, while the entirely subordinate role played by Prussia in Europe during this period, together with the personal part taken by the sovereign in the various congresses, gave him little scope for the display of any diplomatic talents he may have possessed. During this time he found plentiful leisure to write a series of works on political philosophy, such as the Nouveaux essais de politique et de philosophie published in Paris 1824.

In 1828 Ancillon published in Berlin Zur Vermittlung der Extreme in den Meinungen and passed judgement on the English constitution. His contemporary Friedrich Christoph Dahlmann was a German liberal and reckoned that all "new European states" should aspire to the English constitution. Ancillon was a German conservative and published a more balanced opinion. He regarded the English constitution as a historic document and wrote "the power of England, as well as the perfection of commerce and of the mechanism of productive work in this country' by other elements as the English constitution like in particular the strong importance of self-government and the weak presence of state officials."

In May 1831 Ancillon was made an active privy councillor, was appointed chief of the department for the Principality of Neuchâtel, in July became secretary of state for foreign affairs, and in the spring of 1832, on Bernstorff's retirement, succeeded him as head of the ministry.

By the German public, to whom Ancillon was known only through his earlier writings and some isolated protests against the "demagogue-hunting" in fashion at Berlin, his advent to power was hailed as a triumph of liberalism. They were soon undeceived. Ancillon had convinced himself that the rigid social class distinctions of the Prussian system were the philosophically ideal basis of the state, and that representation "by estates" was the only sound constitutional principle.

His last and indeed only act of importance as minister was his collaboration with Klemens von Metternich in the Vienna Final Act of 12 June 1834, the object of which was to rivet this system upon Germany forever. When he died, he was the last of his family. His historical importance lies neither in his writings nor in his political activity, but in his personal influence at the Prussian court, and especially in its lasting effect on the character of Frederick William IV.

== Philosophy ==
The political philosophy of Ancillon moves in an area of tension between the Enlightenment, Romanticism and Christianity. Ancillon's philosophy, using an eclectic method, is based primarily on Edmund Burke and Charles de Montesquieu. Ancillon's political and philosophical development was significantly influenced by his experience of the French Revolution as an eyewitness. Ancillon's goal is always the harmony of domestic and foreign policy, the avoidance of conflicts, and the organic development of the state and society.

Without developing a complete and systematic political philosophy, Ancillon starts from basic Enlightenment assumptions such as the perfectibility of humans and the comprehensive influence of understanding and reason on human actions. At the same time, however, only that society is desirable which is not constructed solely according to rational principles, but has grown organically over the course of history and the succession of generations. Ancillon therefore rejects both the radical Enlightenment, which he holds responsible for the French Revolution, and mere romanticism, which he denies the ability of a practical state construction that opens up developmental opportunities for people. The aim of Ancillon's political philosophy is the synthesis of Enlightenment and Romanticism under conservative auspices, namely in a corporate state that satisfies the demands of reason.

== Honours ==
- Knight Grand Cross in the Order of the Red Eagle, 1st Class.
- Knight in the Order Of The Iron Cross (1st Class).
- Knight Grand Cross in the Order of Fidelity, Baden.
- Knight Grand Cross in the Order of the Crown of Bavaria
- Knight Grand Cross in the Legion of Honour.
- Knight Grand Cross in the Order of the Lion of Hesse.
- Knight Grand Cross in the Order of Saint Stephen of Hungary.
- Knight Grand Cross in the Order of Alexander Nevsky
- Knight Grand Cross in the Order of Saint Anna
- Knight Grand Cross in the Order of Merit of Saxony-Anhalt
- Knight Grand Cross in the Order of Saints Maurice and Lazarus
- Knight Grand Cross in the House Order of Saxe-Ernestine
- Commander of the Order of the Polar Star
