= King in Prussia =

Title used by the Prussian kings from 1701 to 1772

King in Prussia (German: König in Preußen) was a title used by the Prussian kings (also in personal union Electors of Brandenburg) from 1701 to 1772. Subsequently, they used the title King of Prussia (König von Preußen).

The House of Hohenzollern ruled Brandenburg as Prince-Electors, and were subjects of the Holy Roman Emperor. Since 1618, the Electors of Brandenburg had also ruled the Duchy of Prussia, which lay outside the empire, in a personal union. The dual state was known unofficially as Brandenburg-Prussia. Originally the dukes of Prussia held the fief as vassals of the King of Poland, until the Treaties of Labiau (1656) and Bromberg (1657), with which Frederick William, the Great Elector, achieved full sovereignty from the Polish Crown. His son, Elector Frederick III, then sought to show his greatness by adopting the title king.

At the time, the only royal titles within the Holy Roman Empire were those of King of the Romans (held by the Holy Roman Emperor or his heir apparent) and King of Bohemia (held more or less continuously since the 16th century by the Holy Roman Emperors in a de facto personal union). However, Prussia lay outside the empire, and the Hohenzollerns were fully sovereign over it. Frederick thus argued that German law of the time allowed him to rule Prussia as a kingdom, outside the borders of the Holy Roman Empire.

In the Crown Treaty of 16 November 1700, in return for Hohenzollern assistance in the War of the Spanish Succession and support for the Habsburg candidate in the subsequent imperial election, Emperor Leopold I allowed Frederick to crown himself "King in Prussia". The title "King in Prussia" reflected the legal fiction that Frederick was sovereign only over his, formerly Polish, Duchy of Prussia. In Brandenburg and other Hohenzollern domains within the borders of the empire, he was legally still an elector under the ultimate overlordship of the emperor. By this time, however, the emperor's authority had become purely nominal. The rulers of the empire's member states acted largely as rulers of sovereign states, and only acknowledged the emperor's suzerainty in a formal way. Hence, even though Brandenburg was still legally part of the empire and ruled in personal union with Prussia, the two states came to be treated as one de facto. Although Prussia's royal title gave the Hohenzollern rulers higher status, Brandenburg was the wealthier and more populous portion of the combined realm, and Brandenburg's capital Berlin remained the primary residence of the King and his administration. In addition, the Duchy was only the eastern bulk of the region of Prussia; the westernmost fragment constituted the part of Royal Prussia east of the Vistula, held along with the title King of Prussia by the King of Poland.

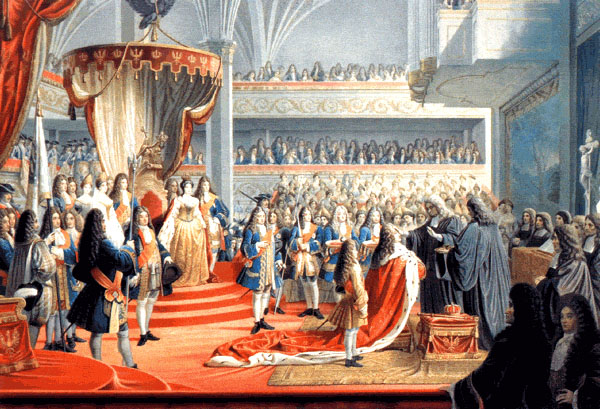
Anointing of Frederick I in Königsberg Castle

On 17 January 1701, Frederick dedicated the royal coat of arms, the Prussian black eagle with the motto "suum cuique" imprinted. On 18 January, he crowned himself and his wife Sophie Charlotte in a baroque ceremony in Königsberg Castle. Frederick's move was controversial, and only became widely accepted after the Treaty of Utrecht in 1713. Throughout the 18th century, the Hohenzollerns increased their power. They were victorious over the Austrian Habsburg monarchy in the three Silesian Wars, greatly increasing their power through the acquisition of Silesia.

King Frederick II adopted the title King of Prussia in 1772, the same year he annexed most of Royal Prussia in the First Partition of Poland. The Hohenzollerns continued to be both Kings of Prussia and Electors of Brandenburg until the empire's dissolution in 1806. At that point, the entire realm was formally unified as the Kingdom of Prussia, with Brandenburg one of its provinces and Berlin the kingdom's capital, though the two parts became partially distinct again during the existence of the German Confederation (1815–1866).

== See also ==
- List of monarchs of Prussia
