= Sayn-Wittgenstein-Vallendar =

Holy Roman Empire county in Germany

County of Sayn-Wittgenstein-Vallendar Grafschaft Sayn-Wittgenstein-Vallendar
- 1657–1775
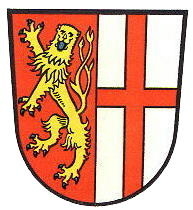
- Coat of arms
- Status: State of the Holy Roman Empire
- Capital: Vallendar
- Government: Principality
- Historical era: Middle Ages
  - Partitioned from S-W-Wittgenstein: 1657
  - Inherited by S-W-Hohnstein: 1775
Preceded by	Succeeded by
Sayn-Wittgenstein-Wittgenstein	Sayn-Wittgenstein-Hohnstein

Sayn-Wittgenstein-Vallendar was a County of the Holy Roman Empire. It was created as a partition of Sayn-Wittgenstein-Wittgenstein, and was inherited by Sayn-Wittgenstein-Hohenstein in 1775.

== Counts of Sayn-Wittgenstein-Vallendar (1657–1775) ==
- Friedrich Wilhelm (1657–1685|85)
- Johann Friedrich (1685–1718)
- Franz Friedrich Hugo (1718–1769)
- Johann Wilhelm (1718–1775)
