= Sayn-Wittgenstein-Hohenstein =

Coordinates: 50°55′N 8°24′E

County of Sayn-Wittgenstein-Hohenstein Grafschaft Sayn-Wittgenstein-Hohenstein
- 1657–1806
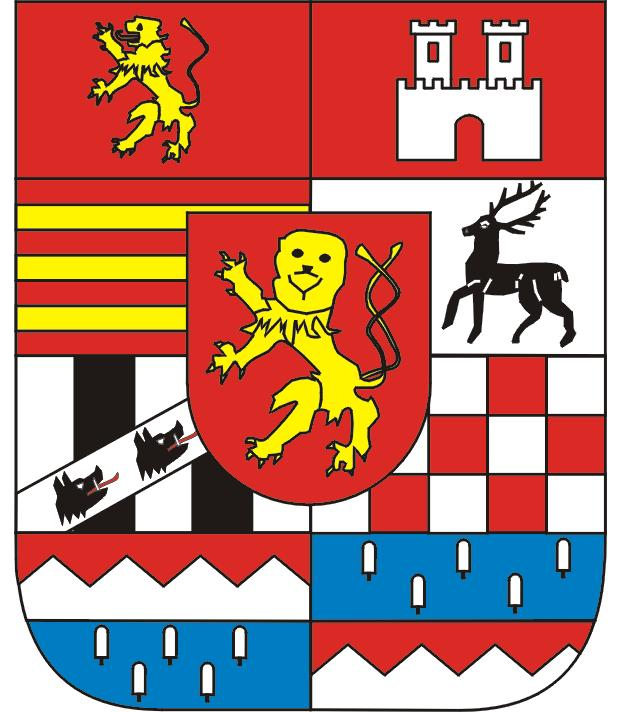
- Coat of arms
- Status: State of the Holy Roman Empire
- Capital: Laasphe
- Government: Principality
- Historical era: Middle Ages
  - Partitioned from S-W-Wittgenstein: 1657
  - Raised to principality: 1801
  - Mediatised to Hesse: 1806
  - Annexed by Prussia: 1816
Preceded by	Succeeded by
Image missing / Sayn-Wittgenstein-Wittgenstein	Grand Duchy of Hesse

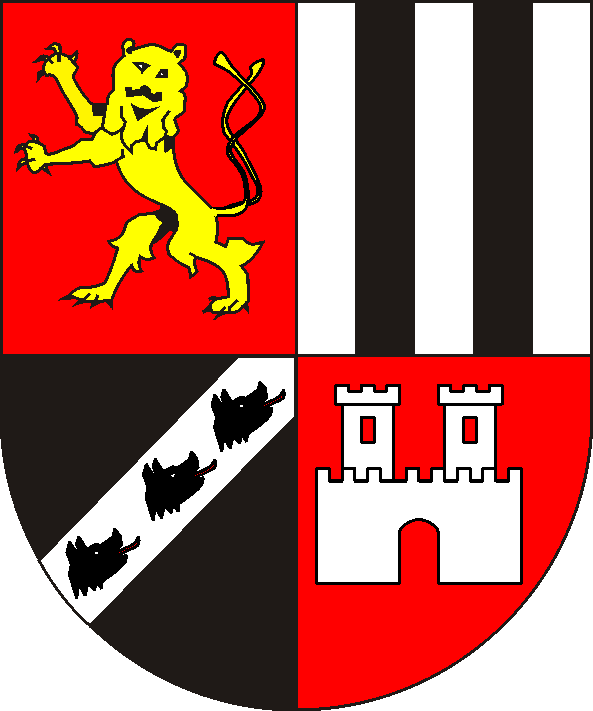
Coat of arms of the Counts of Sayn-Wittgenstein-Hohenstein (1657)

Sayn-Wittgenstein-Hohenstein was a county and later principality between Hesse-Darmstadt and Westphalia.

== History ==
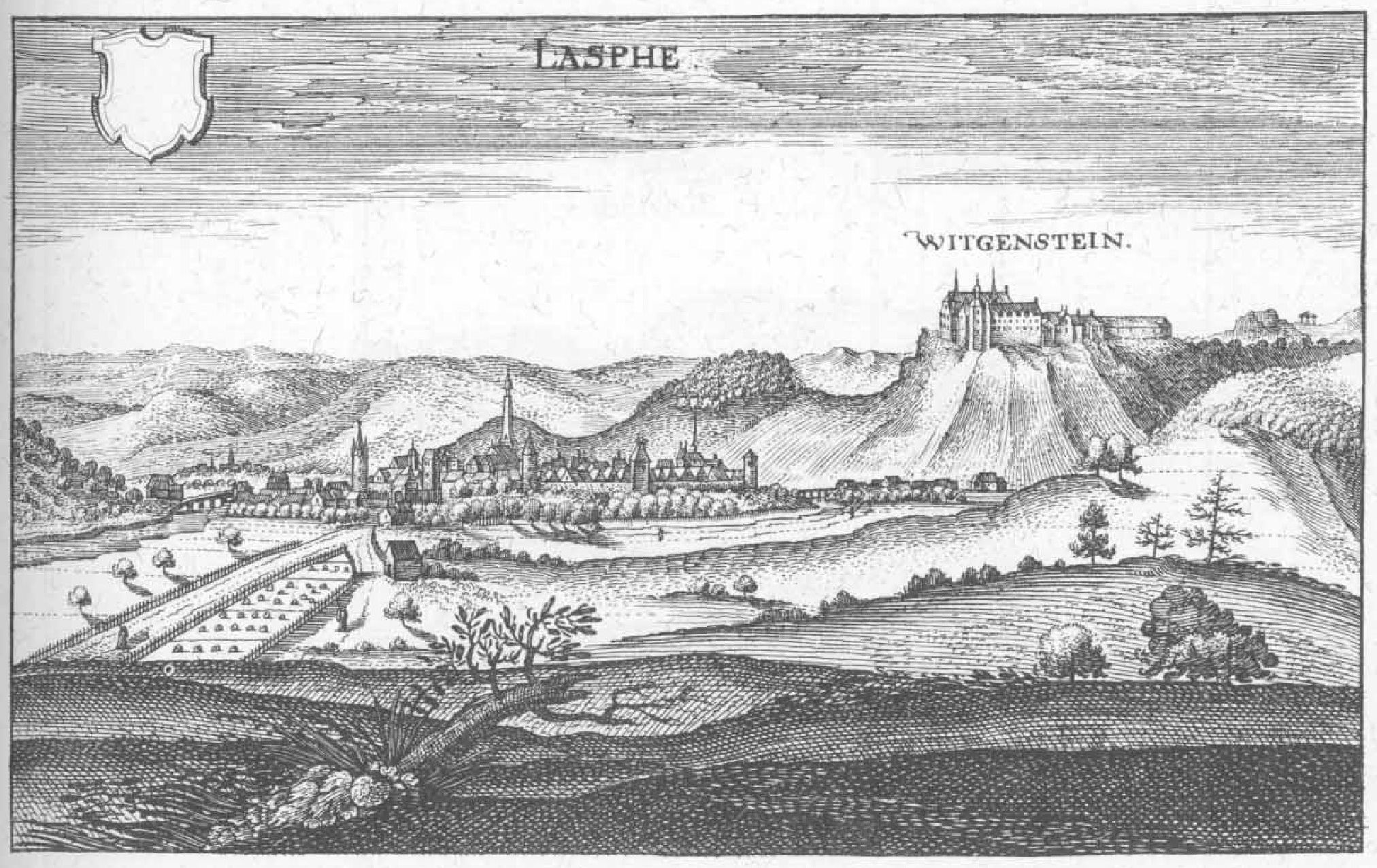
Laasphe and Wittgenstein Castle in 1655

The county with imperial immediacy was formed by the 1657 partition of Sayn-Wittgenstein-Wittgenstein and raised from a county to a principality of the Holy Roman Empire in 1801. It belonged from 1806 to 1815 to the Grand Duchy of Hesse and after 1816 to Prussia. The capital was Laasphe. The family line belongs to the house of Sayn-Wittgenstein-Berleburg.

== Current Prince of Sayn-Wittgenstein-Hohenstein ==
The current head of this branch of the House of Sayn is Bernhart, 6th Prince zu Sayn-Wittgenstein-Hohenstein. He is the son of Christian Heinrich, 5th Prince zu Sayn-Wittgenstein-Hohenstein (1908-1983) and of Princess Dagmar zu Sayn-Wittgenstein-Hohenstein (1919-2002)

== Succession to the Hohenstein secundogeniture ==
Four dynastic branches of the House of Sayn were extant at the beginning of the 20th century, each possessing its own secundogeniture. In order of seniority of legitimate descent from their progenitor, Ludwig I, Count of Sayn-Wittgenstein (1532-1605), they were the:

1. Princes (Fürsten) zu Sayn-Wittgenstein-Berleburg, descended from Count Georg (1565-1631)
2. Princes (Fürsten) zu Sayn-Wittgenstein-Sayn, descended from Count Christian Ludwig (1725-1797)
3. Counts zu Sayn-Wittgenstein-Berleburg, descended from Count Georg Ernst (1735-1792)
4. Princes (Fürsten) zu Sayn-Wittgenstein-Hohenstein, descended from Count Ludwig (1571-1634)

Some of these lines had junior branches, both dynastic and non-dynastic, the latter including families whose right to the princely title was recognized by the Russian, Prussian and Bavarian monarchies, whereas other morganatic branches used lesser titles in Germany.

On the death of Ludwig, 3rd Prince of Sayn-Wittgenstein-Hohenstein in 1912, the eldest of his three sons, Hereditary Prince August (1868-1947), became 4th Prince of Sayn-Wittgenstein-Hohenstein and head of the third branch of the House of Sayn. Being a childless bachelor, the elder of whose two younger brothers, Georg (1873-1960), had married morganatically, while the younger, Wilhelm (1877-1958), was 49 and yet unmarried, August preserved the name and heritage of his branch of the House of Sayn by adopting Christian Heinrich Prinz zu Sayn-Wittgenstein-Berleburg (1908-1953). He was the second son of the late head of the entire House of Sayn, Richard, 4th Prince of Sayn-Wittgenstein-Berleburg (1882-1925), whose eldest son, Gustav Albrecht (1907-1944) had inherited the senior line's fortune and position.

In November 1960, Christian Heinrich, being the divorced father of three daughters by his dynastic marriage to Beatrix Gräfin von Bismarck-Schönhausen (1921-2006), married Dagmar Prinzessin zu Sayn-Wittgenstein-Hohenstein (1919-2002), elder daughter of his adopted father's younger brother, Georg, who died seven months before the wedding. As Georg's children by his morganatic wife, Marie Rühm, (created Baroness von Freusburg by the reigning Prince of Lippe in 1916) had been de-morganatized by declaration of their uncle August on 11 February 1947, her marriage to Christian Heinrich was deemed a dynastic match, ensuring that their son Bernhart would be born in compliance with the house laws of his adoptive ancestors, the Sayn-Wittgenstein-Hohensteins, as well as being a grandson of the last dynastic male of that family, Prince Georg.

=== Counts of Sayn-Wittgenstein-Hohenstein (1657–1801) ===
- Gustav (1657–1701)
- Heinrich Albert (1701–23)
- Augustus (1723–35)
- Friedrich I (1735–56)
- Johann Ludwig (1756–96)
- Friedrich II (1796–1801)

=== Prince of Sayn-Wittgenstein-Hohenstein (1801–1806) ===
- Friedrich II (1801–06)
- Wilhelm Ludwig (1804-1806)
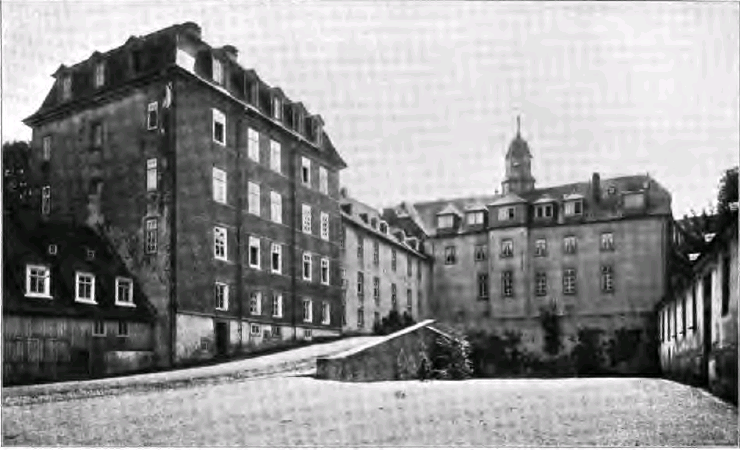
Wittgenstein Castle near Bad Laasphe, until 1950 seat of the princes of Sayn-Wittgenstein-Hohenstein

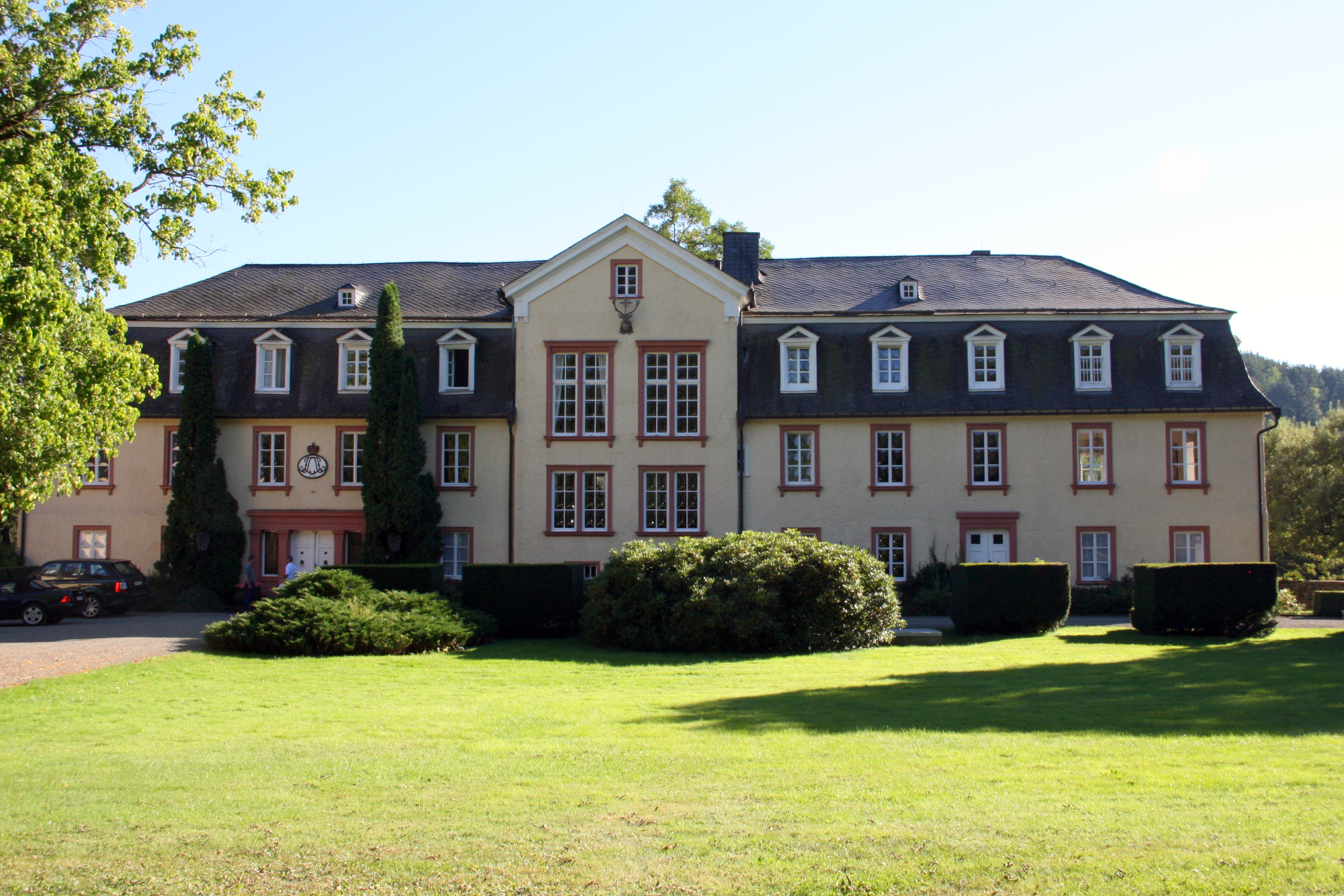
Schwarzenau Castle, actual family seat
