= List of states in the Holy Roman Empire (S) =

This is a list of states in the Holy Roman Empire beginning with the letter S. Some historians mark the beginning of the Empire as 800, with the coronation of Frankish king Charlemagne ("Charles the Great").

Name	Type	Imperial circle	Imperial diet	History
Saarbrücken	County	n/a	n/a	1080: Saargau invested on Sigebert I, founder of the line of Saarbrücken; 1118: First use of the title Count of Saarbrücken; 1125: Partitioned into Alsace and itself c. 1182: Partitioned into itself, Saarbrücken-Hardenburg and Zweibrücken; 1227: Parts made fief of Metz; 1274: Extinct; to Saarbrücken-Commercy
Saarbrücken-Commercy	County	n/a	n/a	1274: Title assumed by Commercy after inheritance of Saarbrücken; 1341: Partitioned into itself and a Lordship (see below); 1381: Extinct; to Nassau-Weilburg
Saarbrücken-Commercy	Lordship	n/a	n/a	1341: Partitioned as a Lordship from the County above 1459: Acquired Braine; 1465: Partitioned into Saarbrücken-Commercy-Rouen and Saarbrücken-Commercy-Braine
Saarbrücken-Commercy-Braine	Lordship	n/a	n/a	1465: Partitioned from Saarbrücken-Commercy (Lordship); 1525: Extinct in male line 1526: To Mark-Sedan by marriage
Saarbrücken-Commercy-Rouen	Lordship	n/a	n/a	1465: Partitioned from Saarbrücken-Commercy (Lordship); 1497: Extinct; to Saarbrücken-Commercy-Braine
Saarbrücken-Hardenburg	County	n/a	n/a	c. 1182: Partitioned from Saarbrücken; 1212: Inherited Leiningen and assumed that name
Saarburg; See: Sarrebourg	Imperial City			
Saarwerden	County	n/a	n/a	1125: Partitioned from Blieskastel; 1212: Partitioned into itself and Kirkel; 1397: Extinct; succession dispute between Moers and Metz; 1399: To Moers; 1417: To Moers-Saarwerden; 1527: Extinct; to Nassau-Saarbrücken; 1574: To Nassau-Neuweilnau; 1602: Returned to Nassau-Saarbrücken; 1629: To Lorraine; 1648: Returned to Nassau-Saarbrücken except Bockenheim; 1794: To France
Sachsen; See: Electorate of Saxony	Duchy; 1356: Electorate			
Sagan (Żagań)	Duchy	n/a	n/a	1278: Partitioned from Silesia-Glogau; part of Poland; 1329: Under suzerainty of Bohemia; 1478: To Saxony as fief of Bohemia; 1549: To Bohemia directly 1628: To Albrecht von Wallenstein as fief of Bohemia; 1634: To Bohemia directly 1646: To Lobkowicz as fief of Bohemia; 1742: To Lobkowicz as fief of Prussia; 1786: To Biron as fief of Prussia
Mark an der Sann (AKA Sannmark, Mark an der Sawe, Sann-Gft., Sann-Mgft., Mgft. Soun(e), Gft Soun(e), Sanntal, Saunien)	Margraviate	n/a		Before 980: Formed; 1137 or 1144: Last Margrave dies; margravial title no longer held 1147: Territory of the former march becomes part of Styria; attested as a Styrian Amt from 1182: Formed; 1269: Seized by Ottokar II of Bohemia; united with Windischgraz, Carniola and the Windic March to form a single march c. 1300: Acquired by the Counts of Heunburg as the lordship of Cilli; 1323: Territory passes to the Counts of Pfannberg; 1341: Rulers now known as the Counts of Cilli (see also County of Cilli); 1460: Territory passes to the Habsburgs. Later integrated into Styria
St Ägidien; See: St Giles	Abbacy			
St Blaise (St Blasien)	Abbacy	Swab	SC	10th Century? 1609: HRE Counts of Bonndorf; imperial immediacy 1803: To Order of St John; 1805: To Württemberg; 1806: To Baden
St Emmeram	Abbacy	Bav	RP	c. 739: Formed; 1295: Imperial immediacy 1731: HRE Prince of the Empire; 1803: To Regensburg; buildings to Thurn and Taxis
St Gall (St Gallen)	Abbacy	Swab	SP	613: Formed; 1207: HRE Prince of the Empire; imperial immediacy 1270: Acquired Neuravensburg; 1401: Lost Appenzell; 1415: Lost City of St Gall; 1451: Protectorate of the Swiss Confederation; 1468: Acquired Toggenburg; 1648: Left the Empire as part of Switzerland (except Neuravensburg); 1803: Neuravensburg to Dietrichstein
St Gall (St Gallen)	Imperial City	Swab	SW	1415: Free Imperial City; 1454: Associate of the Swiss Confederacy; 1648: Left the Empire as part of Switzerland; 1798: new Canton of Säntis in the Helvetic Republic; 1803: Canton of St. Gallen
St George (St Georg; in Isny)	Abbacy	Swab	SP	1096: Formed; 1781: Imperial immediacy 1803: To Quadt-Isny
St George (St Georg; in Stein)	Abbacy	Swab	SP	10th Century: Formed; 1007: Relocated to Stein; 15th Century: Imperial immediacy 1521: To Zürich
St Giles (St Ägidien)	Abbacy	Franc	RP	1140: Established with imperial immediacy 1525: To Nuremberg
St Hubert	Abbacy	n/a	n/a	687: Formed; 1522: Imperial immediacy 1797: To France; 1815: To the Netherlands; 1830: To Belgium
St John (St Johann; in the Thurtal)	Abbacy	Swab	SP	before 1152: Formed; 1227/8: Imperial immediacy 1555: To St Gall
St John (St Johann)	Order of Chivalry	n/a	RP / PR	c. 1099: Formed; In possession of numerous territories across Germany; 1546: Bench of Spiritual Princes; 1805: All territories annexed by various states
St Kornelimünster; See: Kornelimünster	Abbacy			
St Ludger (Helmstedt)	Abbacy	Low Rhen	RP	c. 800: Formed; Always in personal union with Werden Abbey by 13th Century: Imperial immediacy 1490: Helmstedt sold to Brunswick-Wolfenbüttel; 1802: To Brunswick-Wolfenbüttel
St. Mang	Abbacy	n/a	n/a	748: Formed; 1268: Imperial immediacy 1313: To the Bishopric of Augsburg; 1803: To Oettingen-Wallerstein; 1806: To Bavaria
St Maximin	Abbacy	Low Rhen	RP	4th Century: Formed; By 12th Century: Imperial immediacy 1669: To Trier
St Peter	Abbacy	Swab	SP	Before 1073: Formed; 1093: Imperial immediacy 1526: To Austria
St Ulrich and St Afra in Augsburg	Abbacy	Swab	SP	10th Century: Formed; 1577: Imperial immediacy (challenged until 1643); 1802: Divided between Augsburg and Bavaria
St Ulrich and St Afra in Neresheim; See: Neresheim	Abbacy			
Salem (Salmannsweiler)	Abbacy	Swab	SP	1136: Formed; 1138: Imperial immediacy 1803: To Baden
Salm	County	n/a	n/a	1036: First mentioned; to Luxembourg; 1059: Partitioned from Luxembourg; 1163: Partitioned into Salm in the Vosges (Upper Salm) and Salm in the Ardennes (Lower Salm)
Salm	Wild- and Rhinegraviate	Upp Rhen	n/a	1475: Renamed from Stein after inheritance of Salm in the Vosges; 1499: Partitioned into Salm-Dhaun-Neufviller and Salm-Kyrburg
Salm in the Ardennes (Lower Salm; Niedersalm)	County	n/a	n/a	1163: Partitioned from Salm; to Vianden; 1175: Partitioned from Vianden; 1416: Extinct; to Altenbaumberg in succession dispute with Reifferscheid-Bedburg; 1456: To Reifferscheid-Bedburg; 1460: Reifferscheid-Bedburg took the name Salm-Reifferscheid
Salm in the Vosges (Upper Salm; Obersalm)	County	n/a	n/a	1163: Partitioned from Salm; 1225: Partitioned into itself and Salm-Blâmont; 1337: Partitioned into itself and Salm-Püttlingen; 1431: Partitioned into itself and Salm-Badonviller; 1475: Extinct; to Stein by marriage who took the name Salm
Salm-Badonviller (Salm-Badenweiler)	County	n/a	n/a	1431: Partitioned from Salm in the Vosges; 1528: Side line Salm-Neuburg created 1600: Extinct; divided between Wild- and Rhinegraviate of Salm and Lorraine; 1738: Left the Empire; made part of France; 1789: To France directly
Salm-Blâmont (Salm-Blankenberg)	Lordship	n/a	n/a	1225: Partitioned from Salm in the Vosges; 1247: Made fief of Metz; 1499: Half sold to Lorraine; 1506: Extinct; remainder to Lorraine
Salm-Dhaun	Wild- and Rhinegraviate	Upp Rhen	n/a	1574: Partitioned from Salm-Dhaun-Neufviller; 1697: Partitioned into itself and Salm-Püttlingen; 1748: Extinct; to Salm-Püttlingen
Salm-Dhaun-Neufviller	Wild- and Rhinegraviate	Upp Rhen	n/a	1499: Partitioned from Salm; 1574: Partitioned into Salm-Salm-Neufviller, Salm-Grumbach and Salm-Dhaun
Salm-Grumbach; Forest and Rhine Count of Salm in Horstmar	Wild- and Rhinegraviate	Upp Rhen	WT	1574: Partitioned from Salm-Dhaun-Neufviller; 1668: Partitioned into itself and Salm-Rheingrafenstein and Gaugrehweiler; 1793: To France; 1803: Compensated with Horstmar; renamed to Salm-Horstmar; 1816: To Lichtenberg
Salm-Horstmar	Wild- and Rhinegraviate	Upp Rhen	WT	1803: Renamed from Salm-Grumbach; 1806: To Berg; 1810: To France; 1815: To Prussia
Salm-Kyrburg	Wild- and Rhinegraviate; 1743: Principality	Upp Rhen	WE	1499: Partitioned from Salm; 1607: Partitioned into Salm-Kyrburg-Mörchingen, Salm-Kyrburg-Kyrburg and Salm-Kyrburg-Dhronecken; 1743: Renamed from Salm-Neufviller-Leuze; HRE Prince; 1794: To France; 1803: Compensated with Ahaus and Bocholt; Bench of Princes; 1810: To France; 1815: To Prussia
Salm-Kyrburg-Dhronecken (Salm-Tronecken)	Wild- and Rhinegraviate	Upp Rhen	n/a	1607: Partitioned from Salm; 1637: Extinct; divided between Salm-Kyrburg-Mörchingen and Salm-Kyrburg-Kyrburg
Salm-Kyrburg-Kyrburg	Wild- and Rhinegraviate	Upp Rhen	n/a	1607: Partitioned from Salm; 1681: Extinct; to Salm-Kyrburg-Mörchingen
Salm-Kyrburg-Mörchingen	Wild- and Rhinegraviate	Upp Rhen	n/a	1607: Partitioned from Salm; 1688: Extinct; to Salm-Neufviller
Salm-Neuburg	County; 1529: County Palatine	n/a	n/a	1528: Created when Nicholas I purchased Neuburg; fief of Austria; 1529: HRE Count Palatine; 1654: Neuburg sold to Sinzendorf; 1784: Extinct
Salm-Neufviller (Salm-Neuweiler)	Wild- and Rhinegraviate	n/a	n/a	1610: Partitioned from Salm-Salm-Neufviller; 1696: Partitioned into Salm-Neufviller-Hoogstraten and Salm-Neufviller-Leuze
Salm-Neufviller-Hoogstraten	Wild- and Rhinegraviate	n/a	n/a	1696: Partitioned from Salm-Neufviller; 1709: Acquired Hoogstraten as fief of Brabant; 1738: Inherited and renamed to Salm-Salm
Salm-Neufviller-Leuze	Wild- and Rhinegraviate	n/a	n/a	1696: Partitioned from Salm-Neufviller; 1743: Renamed to Salm-Kyrburg
Salm-Püttlingen	Lordship	n/a	n/a	1337: Partitioned from Salm in the Vosges; 1368: Extinct; to Salm in the Vosges
Salm-Püttlingen	Wild- and Rhinegraviate	Upp Rhen	n/a	1697: Partitioned from Salm-Dhaun; 1750: Extinct; to Salm-Grumbach
Salm-Reifferscheid	County; 1628: Altgraviate	n/a	n/a	1460: Renamed from Reifferscheid-Bedburg; 1628: HRE Altgrave; 1639: Partitioned into Salm-Reifferscheid-Bedburg and Salm-Reifferscheid-Dyck
Salm-Reifferscheid-Bedburg	Altgraviate	n/a	n/a	1639: Partitioned from Salm-Reifferscheid; 1734: Partitioned into itself, Salm-Reifferscheid-Hainspach and Salm-Reifferscheid-Raitz; 1794: To France; 1803: Compensated with Krautheim; renamed to Salm-Reifferscheid-Krautheim
Salm-Reifferscheid-Dyck	Altgraviate	n/a	n/a	1639: Partitioned from Salm-Reifferscheid-Bedburg; 1806: Divided between Baden and Württemberg
Salm-Reifferscheid-Hainspach	Altgraviate	n/a	n/a	1734: Partitioned from Salm-Reifferscheid-Bedburg in fiefs of Austria
Salm-Reifferscheid-Krautheim	Altgraviate; 1804: Principality	n/a	n/a	1803: Renamed from Salm-Reifferscheid-Bedburg; 1804: HRE Prince; 1806: Divided between Baden and Württemberg
Salm-Reifferscheid-Raitz	Altgraviate	n/a	n/a	1734: Partitioned from Salm-Reifferscheid-Bedburg in fiefs of Austria
Salm-Rheingrafenstein and Gaugrehweiler	Wild- and Rhinegraviate	Upp Rhen	WT	1668: Partitioned from Salm-Grumbach; 1750: Extinct; to Salm-Grumbach
Salm-Salm	Wild- and Rhinegraviate; 1623: Principality	Upp Rhen	WT	1610: Partitioned from Salm-Salm-Neufviller; 1623: HRE Prince; 1654: Bench of Secular Princes; 1738: Inherited by Salm-Neufviller-Hoogstaten; 1793: To France; 1803: Compensated with Ahaus and Bocholt; 1810: To France; 1815: To Prussia
Salm-Salm-Neufviller	Wild- and Rhinegraviate	Upp Rhen	WT	1574: Partitioned from Salm-Dhaun-Neufviller; 1610: Partitioned into Salm-Salm and Salm-Neufviller
Salmannsweiler; See: Salem	Abbacy			
Salzburg	Bishopric; 798: Archbishopric	Bav	EC	c. 543: Formed; 798: Raised to Archbishopric; 1278: HRE Prince of the Empire; 1803: Secularised as an Electorate for Ferdinand III of Tuscany
Salzburg	Electorate	n/a	n/a	1803: Salzburg, Eichstätt, Berchtesgaden and 1/2 of Passau secularised as an Electoral Grand Duchy for Ferdinand III of Tuscany; 1805: Divided between Austria and Bavaria. Ferdinand III compensated with Würzburg
Sargans	County	n/a	n/a	1258: To Werdenberg-Sargans; 1342: To Werdenberg-Sargans-Sargans; 1396: To Austria; 1436: To Werdenberg-Sargans-Sargans; 1483: Condominium of the Old Swiss Confederacy; 1648: Left the Empire as part of Switzerland
Sarrebourg	Imperial City	Upp Rhen	RC	1171: To Dagsburg as a fief of Metz; 1225: To Metz directly 1476: Free Imperial City; 1661: To France
Savoy	Duchy	Upp Rhen	PR	1003: Humbert I made count of Savoy; 1218: Acquired Zähringen Vaud; 1313: Imperial immediacy 1388: Acquired Nice; 1401: Acquired Geneva; 1416: HRE Duke; 1419: Acquired Piedmont; 1536: To France; 1559: Restored; 1713: Acquired the Kingdom of Sicily; 1720: Traded Sicily for Sardinia; 1792: To France; 1815: Restored; 1860: To France
Sax	Barony	n/a	n/a	1137/9: First mentioned 1248: Partitioned into Sax-Misox and Hohensax
Sax-Misox	Barony; 1413: County	n/a	n/a	1248: Partitioned from Sax; 1413: HRE Count; 1424: Joined the Grey League; 1483: Most sold to Brandis; 1485: Remainder sold to Lucerne; 1540: Extinct
Saxony	County Palatine	n/a	n/a	965: Adalbero appointed Count Palatine of Saxony; 1003: To Goseck; 1097: To Sommerschenburg; 1180: To Thuringia; 1247: To Meissen; 1291: Northern part sold to Brandenburg; southern part known as County Palatine of Thuringia; 1347: Sold to Meissen
Saxony	Margraviate; 888: Stem Duchy	n/a	n/a	c. 850: Formed; 888: Duchy; 1180: Henry the Lion deposed; the old duchy of Saxony was broken up and former fiefs were granted imperial immediacy. Remaining unconnected territory around Hadeln, Lauenburg and Wittenberg to the House of Ascania; see below.
Saxony	Duchy; 1356: Electorate; 1806: Kingdom	Upp Sax	EL	1180: Remainder of the stem duchy to the House of Ascania; 1212: Partitioned into Anhalt and itself 1296: Partitioned into Saxe-Lauenburg and Saxe-Wittenberg; 1356: Saxe-Wittenberg made Electorate of Saxony; 1422: Extinct; succession dispute between Saxe-Lauenburg, Anhalt and Meissen; 1423: Sold to Meissen, henceforth Electors of Saxony; 1445: Partitioned into itself and Saxe-Thuringia; 1485: Partitioned into itself (Electorate - Ernestine line) and a Duchy (Albertine Line); 1542: Partitioned into itself and Saxe-Coburg; 1547: Capitulation of Wittenberg; Electorate to the Ducal (Albertine) line and the Electoral (Ernestine) relegated to a much reduced Duchy; see below 1559: Acquired Vogtland; 1580: Acquired Mansfeld; 1657: Partitioned into itself, Saxe-Weissenfels-Querfurt, Saxe-Merseburg and Saxe-Zeitz; 1806: Kingdom
Saxony	Duchy; The Electorate of Saxony and Duchy of Saxony were separate entities 1485 - 1572	Upp Sax	PR	1485: Partitioned from the Electorate of Saxony; 1547: Capitulation of Wittenberg; Electorate to the Ducal (Albertine) line and the Electoral (Ernestine) relegated to a much reduced Duchy; see above 1554: Partitioned into Saxe-Coburg, Saxe-Weimar and Saxe-Gotha; 1566: Reunited by Saxe-Weimar; 1572: Partitioned into Saxe-Coburg-Eisenach and Saxe-Weimar
Saxe-Altenburg	Duchy	Upp Sax	PR	1603: Partitioned from Saxe-Weimar; 1826: Partitioned from Saxe-Hildburghausen; 1660: Acquired Themar and Meiningen; 1672: Extinct; divided between Saxe-Gotha and Saxe-Weimar
Saxe-Bergedorf-Lauenburg	Duchy	n/a	n/a	1303: Partitioned from Saxe-Lauenburg; 1321: Acquired Saxe-Ratzeburg. Ceded Bergedorf to Saxe-Mölln. Renamed to Saxe-Ratzeburg-Lauenburg
Saxe-Bergedorf-Mölln	Duchy	n/a	n/a	1321: Renamed from Saxe-Mölln; 1359: Sold Mölln to Lübeck; 1370: Sold remainder of the country to Lübeck; 1401: Extinct; to Saxe-Ratzeburg-Lauenburg
Saxe-Coburg	Duchy	Upp Sax	PR	1542: Partitioned from the Electorate of Saxony (Ernestine line); 1553: Extinct; to the Duchy of Saxony (Ernestine line); 1554: Partitioned from the Duchy of Saxony (Ernestine line); 1566: Under Imperial Ban; country to Saxe-Weimar; 1596: Partitioned from Saxe-Coburg-Eisenach; 1633: Extinct; to Saxe-Eisenach; 1680: Partitioned from Saxe-Gotha; 1699: Extinct; to Saxe-Saalfeld
Saxe-Coburg-Eisenach	Duchy	Upp Sax	PR	1572: Partitioned from the Electorate of Saxony (Ernestine line); 1596: Partitioned into Saxe-Coburg and Saxe-Eisenach
Saxe-Coburg-Saalfeld	Duchy	Upp Sax	PR	1699: Renamed from Saxe-Saalfeld; 1826: Renamed to Saxe-Coburg and Gotha
Saxe-Eisenach	Duchy	Upp Sax	PR	1596: Partitioned from the Saxe-Coburg-Eisenach; 1638: Extinct; divided between Saxe-Altenburg and Saxe-Weimar; 1640: Partitioned from Saxe-Weimar; 1644: Extinct; to Saxe-Weimar; 1662: Partitioned from Saxe-Weimar; 1671: Extinct; to Saxe-Weimar; 1672: Partitioned from Saxe-Weimar; 1741: Extinct; to Saxe-Weimar in personal union
Saxe-Eisenberg	Duchy	Upp Sax	PR	1680: Partitioned from Saxe-Gotha; 1707: Extinct; divided between Saxe-Gotha-Altenburg, Saxe-Meiningen, Saxe-Römhild, Saxe-Hildburghausen and Saxe-Coburg-Saalfeld
Saxe-Gotha	Duchy	Upp Sax	PR	1554: Appanage created from Duchy of Saxony (Ernestine line); 1565: Extinct; to Saxe-Coburg; 1640: Partitioned from Saxe-Weimar; 1680: Partitioned into Saxe-Gotha-Altenburg, Saxe-Coburg, Saxe-Meiningen, Saxe-Römhild, Saxe-Eisenberg, Saxe-Hildburghausen and Saxe-Saalfeld
Saxe-Gotha-Altenburg	Duchy	Upp Sax	PR	1680: Partitioned from Saxe-Gotha; 1826: Extinct; Partitioned into Saxe-Coburg and Gotha and Saxe-Hildburghausen
Saxe-Hildburghausen	Duchy	Upp Sax	PR	1680: Partitioned from Saxe-Gotha; 1826: Partitioned into Saxe-Altenburg, Saxe-Coburg and Gotha and Saxe-Meiningen
Saxe-Jena	Duchy	Upp Sax	PR	1672: Partitioned from the Saxe-Weimar; 1690: Extinct; divided between Saxe-Weimar and Saxe-Eisenach
Saxe-Lauenburg	Duchy, Electorate in opposition to Saxe-Wittenberg until 1356	Low Sax	PR	1296: Partitioned from Saxony; 1303: Partitioned into Saxe-Mölln, Saxe-Bergedorf-Lauenburg and Saxe-Ratzeburg; 1401: Reunited by Saxe-Ratzeburg-Lauenburg; 1689: Extinct in male line; annexed by Brunswick-Lüneburg after exiling heiress Anna Maria and despite large succession dispute 1803: To France; 1806: To Prussia; 1807: To Westphalia; 1811: To France; 1813: To Hanover
Saxe-Meiningen	Duchy	Upp Sax	PR	1680: Partitioned from Saxe-Gotha
Saxe-Merseburg	Duchy	Upp Sax	PR	1657: Partitioned from Electorate of Saxony; 1668: Acquired Forst; 1684: Appanages Saxe-Merseburg-Zörbig, Saxe-Merseburg-Lauchstädt and Saxe-Merseburg-Spremberg created 1731: Inherited by Saxe-Merseburg-Spremberg; 1738: Extinct; to Electorate of Saxony
Saxe-Merseburg-Lauchstädt	Duchy	n/a	n/a	1684: Appanage created within Saxe-Merseburg; 1690: Extinct; appanage abolished
Saxe-Merseburg-Spremberg	Duchy	n/a	n/a	1684: Appanage created within Saxe-Merseburg; 1731: Inherited Saxe-Merseburg; appanage abolished
Saxe-Merseburg-Zörbig	Duchy	n/a	n/a	1684: Appanage created within Saxe-Merseburg; 1751: Extinct; appanage abolished
Saxe-Mölln	Duchy	n/a	n/a	1303: Partitioned from Saxe-Lauenburg; 1321: Acquired Bergedorf; renamed to Saxe-Bergedorf-Mölln
Saxe-Ratzeburg	Duchy	n/a	n/a	1303: Partitioned from Saxe-Lauenburg; 1308: Extinct in male line; half to Saxe-Bergedorf-Lauenburg; 1321: Extinct; rest to Saxe-Bergedorf-Lauenburg
Saxe-Ratzeburg-Lauenburg	Duchy	n/a	n/a	1321: Renamed from Saxe-Bergedorf-Lauenburg; 1401: Renamed to Saxe-Lauenburg
Saxe-Römhild	Duchy	Upp Sax	PR	1680: Partitioned from Saxe-Gotha; 1710: Extinct; to Saxe-Coburg-Saalfeld
Saxe-Saalfeld	Duchy	Upp Sax	PR	1680: Partitioned from Saxe-Gotha; 1699: Acquired Coburg; renamed to Saxe-Coburg-Saalfeld
Saxe-Thuringia	Duchy	n/a	n/a	1445: Partitioned from Saxony; 1482: Extinct; to Saxony
Saxe-Weimar	Duchy	Upp Sax	PR	1554: Partitioned from Duchy of Saxony (Ernestine line); 1566: Renamed to Duchy of Saxony (Ernestine line); 1572: Partitioned from Duchy of Saxony (Ernestine line); 1603: Partitioned into Saxe-Altenburg and itself 1633: Bernard named Duke of Franconia; 1640: Partitioned into itself, Saxe-Eisenach and Saxe-Gotha; 1662: Partitioned into itself and Saxe-Eisenach; 1672: Partitioned into itself, Saxe-Eisenach and Saxe-Jena; 1741: Renamed to Saxe-Weimar-Eisenach
Saxe-Weimar-Eisenach	Duchy; 1815: Grand Duchy	Upp Sax	PR	1741: Renamed from Saxe-Weimar; led Saxe-Eisenach in personal union 1815: Grand Duke
Saxe-Wittenberg	Duchy, Electorate in opposition to Saxe-Lauenburg	n/a	n/a	1296: Partitioned from Saxony; 1290: Acquired Brehna; 1356: Renamed to Electorate of Saxony
Saxe-Weissenfels-Barby	Duchy	n/a	n/a	1680: Appanage created within Saxe-Weissenfels-Querfurt; 1739: Extinct; appanage abolished
Saxe-Weissenfels-Dahme	Duchy	n/a	n/a	1711: Appanage created within Saxe-Weissenfels-Querfurt; 1715: Extinct; appanage abolished
Saxe-Weissenfels-Querfurt	Duchy	Upp Sax	PR	1657: Partitioned from Electorate of Saxony; 1680: Appanage Saxe-Weissenfels-Barby created 1711: Appanage Saxe-Weissenfels-Dahme created 1746: Extinct; to Electorate of Saxony
Saxe-Zeitz	Duchy	Upp Sax	PR	1657: Partitioned from Electorate of Saxony; 1699: Appanage Saxe-Zeitz-Pegau-Neustadt created 1718: Extinct; to Electorate of Saxony
Saxe-Zeitz-Pegau-Neustadt	Duchy	n/a	n/a	1699: Appanage created within Saxe-Zeitz; 1713: Extinct; appanage abolished
Sayn	County	n/a	n/a	1139: First mentioned 1247: Extinct in male line 1263: Extinct; to Sponheim-Starkenburg; 1266: Partitioned from Sponheim-Starkenburg; 1294: Partitioned into Sayn-Sayn and Sayn-Homburg
Sayn-Altenkirchen	County	Low Rhen	WE	1652: Partitioned from Sayn-Wittgenstein-Sayn; 1701: Extinct; to Saxe-Eisenach; 1741: To Brandenburg-Ansbach; 1791: To Prussia; 1803: To Nassau-Usingen; 1806: To Duchy of Nassau; 1815: To Prussia
Sayn-Hachenburg	County	Low Rhen	WE	1652: Partitioned from Sayn-Wittgenstein-Sayn; 1714: Extinct; to Kirchberg; 1799: To Nassau-Weilburg; 1806: To Duchy of Nassau; 1815: Parts ceded to Prussia
Sayn-Homburg	County	n/a	n/a	1294: Partitioned from Sayn; 1361: Acquired Wittgenstein; renamed to Sayn-Wittgenstein
Sayn-Sayn	County	Low Rhen	WE	1294: Partitioned from Sayn; 1608: Extinct; succession dispute between Cologne and Sayn-Wittgenstein-Sayn. Annexed by Cologne
Sayn-Wittgenstein	County	Upp Rhen	WT	1361: Renamed from Sayn-Homburg; 1605: Partitioned into Sayn-Wittgenstein-Berleburg, Sayn-Wittgenstein-Wittgenstein and Sayn-Wittgenstein-Sayn
Sayn-Wittgenstein-Berleburg	County; 1792: Principality	Upp Rhen	WT	1605: Partitioned from Sayn-Wittgenstein; 1694: Appanages Sayn-Wittgenstein-Karlsburg and Sayn-Wittgenstein-Ludwigsburg founded 1792: HRE Prince; 1806: To Berg and Hesse-Darmstadt; 1815: To Prussia
Sayn-Wittgenstein-Hohnstein	County; 1801: Principality	Upp Rhen	WT	1647: Renamed from Sayn-Wittgenstein-Wittgenstein; 1657: Partitioned into itself and Sayn-Wittgenstein-Vallendar; 1801: HRE Prince; 1806: To Hesse-Darmstadt; 1816: To Prussia
Sayn-Wittgenstein-Karlsburg	County	n/a	n/a	1694: Appanage created within Sayn-Wittgenstein-Berleburg; 1806: To Grand Duchy of Hesse
Sayn-Wittgenstein-Ludwigsburg	County	n/a	n/a	1694: Appanage created within Sayn-Wittgenstein-Berleburg
Sayn-Wittgenstein-Sayn	County	Low Rhen	WE	1605: Partitioned from Sayn-Wittgenstein; William III acquired rights to Sayn-Sayn by marriage, however Sayn-Sayn was annexed by Cologne; 1636: Extinct in male line 1648: Acquired Sayn-Sayn; 1652: Partitioned into Sayn-Altenkirchen and Sayn-Hachenburg
Sayn-Wittgenstein-Vallendar	County	n/a	n/a	1657: Partitioned from Sayn-Wittgenstein-Hohnstein; 1775: Extinct; to Sayn-Wittgenstein-Hohnstein
Sayn-Wittgenstein-Wittgenstein	County	Upp Rhen	WT	1605: Partitioned from Sayn-Wittgenstein; 1647: Acquired Hohnstein; renamed to Sayn-Wittgenstein-Hohnstein
Schaffhausen; See: All Saints	Abbacy			
Schaffhausen	Imperial City	Swab	SC	1190: Free Imperial City; 1330: To Austria; 1415: Free Imperial City; 1454: Ally of the Swiss Confederation; 1501: Joined the Swiss Confederation; 1648: Left the Empire as part of Switzerland
Schaesberg	Lordship; 1637: Barony; 1706: County	Low Rhen	WE	1239: First mentioned; branch of Wassenberg; 1410: Extinct; to Retersbeck who soon adopted the name Schaesberg; 1618: Imperial immediacy around Schaesberg Palace; 1637: HRE Baron; 1706: HRE Count; 1712: Acquired Kerpen and Lommersum as fief of the Palatinate; 1786: Imperial immediacy in Kerpen and Lommersum; joined the Westphalian Counts; 1795: To France; 1803: Compensated with Tannheim; 1806: To Württemberg
Schaumburg	Lordship; 1295: County	Low Rhen	WE	1110: Formed; 1227: Acquired Holstein; 1261: To Holstein-Itzehoe; 1290: To Holstein-Schaumburg; 1640: 1/2 to Hesse-Cassel, 1/2 to Lippe-Alverdissen
Schaumburg-Lippe; Prince of Schaumburg-Lippe, Noble Lord of Lippe, Count of Schwalenberg and Sternberg, etc.	County	Low Rhen	WE	1647: Renamed from Lippe-Alverdissen
Schaunberg	Lordship by 1316: County	Aust	WE	c. 1160: First mentioned By 1316: HRE Count; 1367: Acquired Eferding; 1390: Made fief of Austria; 1548: Lost voting rights and representation in the Diet and Austrian Circle; 1559: Extinct; to Austria
Scheer (Scheer and Friedberg)	Lordship; 1463: County; 1785: Princely County	Swab	n/a	1076: First mentioned; to Ruck; 1181: To Montfort; 1258: To Montfort-Tettnang; 1354: To Montfort-Tettnang-Tettnang; 1414: To Zillenhard; 1433: To Waldburg-Sonnenberg; 1447: To Stein; 1452: To Waldburg-Sonnenberg; 1480: To Waldburg-Sonnenberg-Friedberg; 1511: To Waldburg-Trauchburg; 1580: To Waldburg-Friedberg and Scheer; 1696: Placed under Imperial administration 1717: To Waldburg-Friedberg and Scheer; 1764: To Waldburg-Trauchburg; 1775: To Waldburg-Zeil-Trauchburg; 1785: To Thurn and Taxis; 1806: To Württemberg
Schellenberg	Lordship (mediate)	-	-	1137: First mentioned; vassals of Freising; 12th Century: Relocated to modern location 1317: Sold to Werdenberg-Heiligenberg; 1377/8: To Werdenberg-Bludenz; 1412: Sold to Montfort-Tettnang-Tettnang; 1434: Sold to Brandis; 1510: Sold to Sulz; 1613: To Hohenems; 1646: To Hohenems-Vaduz; 1699: Sold to Liechtenstein
Scheuerberg	Lordship	n/a	n/a	1325: Partitioned from Weinsberg; 1335: Sold to Mainz; 1484: To the Teutonic Order; 1806: To Württemberg
Schillingen	Lordship	n/a	n/a	To the Cathedral of Trier; 1794: To France; 1815: To Prussia
Schleiden	Lordship	n/a	n/a	1104: First mentioned 1149: Partitioned into itself and Blankenheim; 1445: Extinct; to Manderscheid; 1488: To Manderscheid-Schleiden; 1560: To Manderscheid-Schleiden-Kerpen; 1593: Divided between Manderscheid-Kail and Mark-Schleiden; 1774: Mark portion to Arenberg; 1794: All to France; 1815: To Prussia
Schlettstadt (Sélestat)	Imperial City	Upp Rhen	RH	1216: Free Imperial City; 1648: To France; 1679: Left the Empire; annexed to France
Schliengen	Lordship	n/a	n/a	1170: To Üsenberg; 1238: To Schaler; 1337: To Neuenfels; 1343: To Basel; 1803: To Baden
Schlitz genannt von Görtz	Lordship; 1677: Barony; 1726: County	Franc	WT	1116: First mentioned as Schlitz; ministerialis of Fulda; 1404: Renamed to Schlitz genannt von Görtz; 1563: Acquired Pfarrstellen; 1656: Imperial immediacy 1804: Seat in the Counts of the Wetterau; 1806: To Hesse-Darmstadt
Schmalkalden	Lordship	n/a	n/a	874: First mentioned; to Thuringia; 1247: To Henneberg-Schleusingen; 1360: Half to Hesse; 1584: All to Hesse
Schmidtburg	Wildgraviate	n/a	n/a	1284: Partitioned from Kyrburg; 1330: Extinct; to Trier
Schönborn	Lordship	n/a	n/a	1275: First mentioned; ministerialis in the Rheingau, possibly vassals of Schaumburg, Diez and Katzenelnbogen; 13th Century?: Partitioned into Schönborn-Burgschwalbach and Schönborn-Westerburg
Schönborn-Buchheim	County	Franc	FR	1711: Renamed from Schönborn-Eschbach; 1717: Partitioned into Schönborn-Wiesentheid and Schönborn-Heusenstamm
Schönborn-Burgschwalbach	Lordship	n/a	n/a	13th Century?: Partitioned from Schönborn c. 1350: Partitioned into itself and Schönborn-Stroß; 15th Century: Partitioned into itself and Schönborn-Hahnstetten ?: Extinct; to Schönborn-Hahnstetten
Schönborn-Eschbach	Lordship; 1663: Barony; 1701: County	Franc	FR	1571: Partitioned from Schönborn-Westerburg; 1650: Acquired Taibach; 1661: Acquired Heusenstamm; 1663: HRE Baron; 1671: Joined the Franconian Counts; 1701: HRE County; 1710: Acquired Puchheim; 1711: Renamed to Schönborn-Buchheim
Schönborn-Freienfels	Lordship; 1663: Barony	Franc	FR	1571: Partitioned from Schönborn-Westerburg; 1654: Extinct; to Schönborn-Eschbach
Schönborn-Hahnstetten	Lordship	n/a	n/a	15th Century: Partitioned from Schönborn-Burgschwalbach; 1640: Extinct
Schönborn-Heusenstamm	County	Franc	FR	1717: Partitioned from Schönborn-Buchheim; 1801: Extinct; to Schönborn-Wiesentheid
Schönborn-Stroß	Lordship	n/a	n/a	c. 1350: Partitioned from Schönborn-Burgschwalbach c. 1400: Extinct
Schönborn-Westerburg	Lordship	n/a	n/a	13th Century?: Partitioned from Schönborn; 1466: Acquired Freienfels as fief of Katzenelnbogen; 1571: Partitioned into Schönborn-Eschbach and Schönborn-Freienfels
Schönborn-Wiesentheid	County	Franc	FR	1717: Partitioned from Schönborn-Buchheim; 1806: To Bavaria
Schönburg	Lordship	n/a	n/a	1130: First mentioned 1182: Acquired Geringswalde; 1256: Acquired Glauchau; 1270: Acquired Crimmitschau; 1286: Acquired Lichtenstein c. 1300: Partitioned into Schönburg-Glauchau and Schönburg-Crimmitschau
Schönburg-Crimmitschau	Lordship	n/a	n/a	c. 1300: Partitioned from Schönburg; 1307: Made fief of Meissen; 1405: Extinct; to Meissen
Schönburg-Forderglauchau	Lordship	Upp Sax	WE	1612: Partitioned from Schönburg-Penig; 1656: Extinct; to Schönburg-Wechselburg
Schönburg-Hartenstein	County	Upp Sax	WE	1701: Partitioned from Schönburg-Waldenburg; 1740: Mediatised to Saxony; 1786: Extinct; to Schönburg-Stein
Schönburg-Glauchau	Lordship	Upp Sax	WE	c. 1300: Partitioned from Schönburg; 1352: Partitioned into itself and Schönburg-Pürschenstein; 1378: Acquired Waldenburg; 1406: Acquired Hartenstein; 1543: Acquired Penig and Wechselburg as fiefs of Saxony; 1548: Acquired Rochsburg as fief of Saxony; 1566: Partitioned into itself, Schönburg-Waldenburg and Schönburg-Penig; 1610: Extinct; to Schönburg-Penig
Schönburg-Hinterglauchau	Lordship; 1700: County	Upp Sax	WE	1612: Partitioned from Schönburg-Penig; 1679: Partitioned into itself and Schönburg-Rochsburg; 1700: HRE Count; 1740: Mediatised to Saxony; 1746: Partitioned into Schönburg-Remse, Schönburg-Rochsburg and itself
Schönburg-Hoyerswerda	Lordship	Upp Sax	WE	1437: Renamed from Schönburg-Neuschönburg; fief of Upper Lusatia (in Bohemia); 1448: Annexed by Saxony; 1554: Restored; 1582: Sold to Promnitz; 1584: Extinct
Schönburg-Lichtenstein	Lordship; 1701: County	Upp Sax	WE	1614: Partitioned from Schönburg-Waldenburg; 1664: Extinct; to Schönburg-Waldenburg; 1701: Partitioned from Schönburg-Waldenburg; 1740: Extinct; to Schönburg-Hartenstein, Schönburg-Stein and Schönburg-Waldenburg
Schönburg-Neuschönburg	Lordship	n/a	n/a	c. 1400: Partitioned from Schönburg-Pürschenstein; 1437: Acquired Hoyerswerda; renamed to Schönburg-Hoyerswerda
Schönburg-Penig	Lordship; 1700: County	Upp Sax	WE	1566: Partitioned from Schönburg-Glauchau; 1612: Partitioned into Schönburg-Hinterglauchau, Schönburg-Rochsburg, Schönburg-Remse, Schönburg-Forderglauchau, Schönburg-Zschillen and Schönburg-Wechselburg
Schönburg-Pürschenstein	Lordship	Upp Sax	WE	1352: Partitioned from Schönburg-Glauchau c. 1400: Partitioned into itself and Schönburg-Neuschönburg; 1538: Extinct; to Schönburg-Hoyerswerda
Schönburg-Remse	Lordship; 1746: County	Upp Sax	WE	1612: Partitioned from Schönburg-Penig; 1640: Extinct; to Schönburg-Hinterglauchau; 1746: Partitioned from Schönburg-Hinterglauchau; mediate to Saxony; 1747: Extinct; to Schönburg-Waldenburg
Schönburg-Rochsburg	Lordship; 1700: County	Upp Sax	WE	1612: Partitioned from Schönburg-Penig; 1636: Extinct; to Schönburg-Hinterglauchau; 1679: Partitioned from Schönburg-Hinterglauchau; 1700: HRE Count; 1729: Extinct; to Schönburg-Hinterglauchau; 1746: Partitioned from Schönburg-Hinterglauchau; mediate to Saxony
Schönburg-Stein (Schönburg-Schwarzenbach)	County	Upp Sax	WE	1701: Partitioned from Schönburg-Waldenburg; 1740: Mediatised to Saxony; 1790: HRE Prince; renamed to Schönburg-Waldenburg
Schönburg-Waldenburg	Lordship; 1700: County; 1790: Principality	Upp Sax	WE	1566: Partitioned from Schönburg-Glauchau; 1614: Partitioned into itself and Schönburg-Lichtenstein; 1700: HRE Count; 1701: Partitioned into Schönburg-Hartenstein, Schönburg-Lichtenstein, Schönburg-Stein and itself 1740: Mediatised to Saxony; 1754: Extinct; to Schönburg-Hartenstein and Schönburg-Stein; 1790: Renamed from Schönburg-Stein; 1800: Partitioned into itself and Schönburg-Hartenstein
Schönburg-Wechselburg	Lordship; 1764: County	Upp Sax	WE	1612: Partitioned from Schönburg-Penig c. 1670: Partitioned into Schönburg-Wechselburg-Wechselburg and Schönburg-Wechselburg-Penig; 1764: Reunited by Schönburg-Wechselburg-Wechselburg; mediate to Saxony
Schönburg-Wechselburg-Penig	Lordship; 1700: County	Upp Sax	WE	c. 1670: Partitioned from Schönburg-Wechselburg; 1700: HRE Count; 1740: Mediatised to Saxony; 1764: Extinct; to Schönburg-Wechselburg-Wechselburg
Schönburg-Wechselburg-Wechselburg	Lordship; 1700: County	Upp Sax	WE	c. 1670: Partitioned from Schönburg-Wechselburg; 1700: HRE Count; 1740: Mediatised to Saxony; 1764: Renamed to Schönburg-Wechselburg
Schönburg-Zschillen	Lordship	Upp Sax	WE	1612: Partitioned from Schönburg-Penig; 1664: Extinct; to Schönburg-Remsa
Schönecken	Lordship	n/a	n/a	1264: Partitioned from Vianden; 1370: Extinct; 1384: To Trier
Schönstein	Lordship	n/a	n/a	1250: To Burgdorf; 1281: To Cologne; 1589: To Hatzfeld-Wildenburg-Werther; 1600: To Hatzfeld-Merthen-Schönstein; 1681: To Hatzfeld-Wildenburg; 1803: To Nassau; 1815: To Prussia
Schöntal	Abbacy	n/a	n/a	1153: Formed; 1157/63: Imperial immediacy 1418: Imperial abbey 1495: Status revoked 1802: Secularised; to Württemberg
Schussenried	Abbacy	Swab	SP	1183: Formed; 1211: Acquired secular territory 1440: Imperial immediacy 1803: To Sternberg-Manderscheid; 1806: To Württemberg
Schwabegg (Schwabeck)	Lordship	n/a	n/a	1110: First mentioned 1167: Extinct; to Hohenstaufen; 1268: To Bavaria
Schwäbisch Gmünd	Imperial City	Swab	SW	1162: First mentioned; to Hohenstaufen; 1268: Free Imperial City; 1802: To Württemberg
Schwäbisch Hall	Imperial City	Swab	SW	1063: First mentioned; to Comburg-Rothenburg c. 1116: To Hohenstaufen; 1280: Free Imperial City; 1802: To Württemberg
Schwäbisch Wörth (Donauwörth)	Imperial City	Swab	SW	11th Century: First mentioned; to Bavaria; 1308: Free Imperial City; 1607: To Bavaria; 1705: Free Imperial City; 1714: To Bavaria
Schwalenberg	County	n/a	n/a	1127: First mentioned 1180: Acquired Pyrmont; 1194: Partitioned into itself and Pyrmont; 1219: Partitioned into itself and Waldeck; 1243: Partitioned into Sternberg and itself 1365: Extinct; to Lippe
Schwarzburg	County	n/a	n/a	11th Century: First mentioned 1160: Partitioned into itself and Käfernburg; 1184: Extinct; to Käfernburg; 1236: Partitioned into Schwarzburg-Leutenberg and Schwarzburg-Blankenburg; 1379: Sold Saalfeld to Meissen; 1599: Division into Schwarzburg-Sondershausen and Schwarzburg-Rudolstadt; 1754: HRE Council of Princes
Schwarzburg-Arnstadt	County; 1697: Principality	Upp Sax	WT	1326: Partitioned from Schwarzburg-Blankenburg; 1334: Acquired Rudolstadt; 1340: Acquired Frankenhausen; 1356: Acquired Sondershausen; partitioned into itself and Schwarzburg-Rudolstadt; 1374: Partitioned into Schwarzburg-Blankenburg and Schwarzburg-Ranis; 1583: Partitioned from Schwarzburg-Blankenburg; 1599: Renamed to Schwarzburg-Sondershausen; 1651: Partitioned from Schwarzburg-Sondershausen; 1669: Extinct; to Schwarzburg-Sondershausen; 1781: Partitioned from Schwarzburg-Sondershausen; 1697: HRE Prince; 1718: Extinct; to Schwarzburg-Sondershausen
Schwarzburg-Arnstadt	Principality	n/a	n/a	1713: Appanage created within Schwarzburg-Sondershausen; 1762: Extinct; appanage abolished
Schwarzburg-Blankenburg	County	Upp Sax	WT	1236: Partitioned from Schwarzburg; 1274: Partitioned into Schwarzburg-Schwarzburg and itself 1306: Acquired Arnstadt; 1326: Partitioned into Schwarzburg-Arnstadt and itself 1357: Extinct; to Schwarzburg-Arnstadt; 1374: Partitioned from Schwarzburg-Arnstadt; 1385: Extinct; to Schwarzburg-Ranis; 1438: Renamed from Schwarzburg-Rudolstadt; 1503: Partitioned into itself and Schwarzburg-Rudolstadt; 1528: Partitioned into itself and Schwarzburg-Frankenhausen; 1583: Partitioned into Schwarzburg-Arnstadt, Schwarzburg-Frankenhausen and Schwarzburg-Rudolstadt
Schwarzburg-Ebeleben	County	Upp Sax	WT	1651: Renamed from Schwarzburg-Sondershausen; 1681: Extinct; divided between Schwarzburg-Arnstadt and Schwarzburg-Sondershausen
Schwarzburg-Ebeleben	Principality	n/a	n/a	1713: Appanage created within Schwarzburg-Sondershausen
Schwarzburg-Frankenhausen	County	Upp Sax	WT	1528: Partitioned from Schwarzburg-Blankenburg; 1537: Extinct; to Schwarzburg-Blankenburg; 1583: Partitioned from Schwarzburg-Blankenburg; 1598: Extinct; to Schwarzburg-Rudolstadt; 1612: Partitioned from Schwarzburg-Rudolstadt; 1624: Traded territory with Count of Schwarzburg-Stadtilm; 1634: Extinct; to Schwarzburg-Rudolstadt
Schwarzburg-Keula	Principality	n/a	n/a	1713: Appanage created within Schwarzburg-Sondershausen; 1740: Inherited Schwarzburg-Sondershausen; appanage abolished
Schwarzburg-Leutenberg	County	Upp Sax	WT	1236: Partitioned from Schwarzburg; 1259: Extinct; to Schwarzburg-Blankenburg; 1362: Partitioned from Schwarzburg-Schwarzburg; 1564: Extinct; to Schwarzburg-Rudolstadt
Schwarzburg-Neustadt	Principality	n/a	n/a	1713: Appanage created within Schwarzburg-Sondershausen; 1749: Extinct; appanage abolished
Schwarzburg-Ranis	County	n/a	n/a	1374: Partitioned from Schwarzburg-Arnstadt; 1418: Extinct; to Schwarzburg-Rudolstadt
Schwarzburg-Rudolstadt; Prince of Schwarzburg (-Rudolstadt), Count of Hohenstein, Lord of Arnstadt, Sondershausen, Leutenberg, Blankenburg, etc.	County; 1710: Principality	Upp Sax	WT / PR	1356: Partitioned from Schwarzburg-Arnstadt; 1438: Renamed to Schwarzburg-Blankenburg; 1503: Partitioned from Schwarzburg-Rudolstadt; 1567: Extinct; to Schwarzburg-Blankenburg; 1583: Partitioned from Schwarzburg-Blankenburg; 1612: Partitioned into itself, Schwarzburg-Frankenhausen and Schwarzburg-Stadtilm; 1710: HRE Prince; 1754: Bench of Secular Princes
Schwarzburg-Schwarzburg	County	n/a	n/a	1274: Partitioned from Schwarzburg-Blankenburg; 1327: Partitioned into itself and Schwarzburg-Wachsenburg; 1362: Partitioned into itself and Schwarzburg-Leutenberg; 1399: Extinct; to Schwarzburg-Leutenberg
Schwarzburg-Sondershausen; HRE Prince of Schwarzburg-Sonderhausen, Count of Hohenstein, Lord of Arnstadt, Sondershausen, Leutenberg	County; 1697: Principality	Upp Sax	WT / PR	1599: Renamed from Schwarzburg-Arnstadt; 1651: Partitioned into Schwarzburg-Arnstadt, itself and Schwarzburg-Ebeleben; 1681: Partitioned into itself and Schwarzburg-Arnstadt; 1697: HRE Prince; 1713: Appanages Schwarzburg-Keula, created 1754: Bench of Secular Princes
Schwarzburg-Stadtilm	County	Upp Sax	WT	1612: Partitioned from Schwarzburg-Rudolstadt; 1624: Traded territory with Count of Schwarzburg-Frankenhausen; 1630: Inherited and renamed to Schwarzburg-Rudolstadt
Schwarzburg-Wachsenburg	County	n/a	n/a	1327: Partitioned from Schwarzburg-Schwarzburg; 1360: Sold Spremberg to Bohemia; 1369: Sold Wachsenburg to Thuringia; 1450: Extinct; to Schwarzburg-Leutenberg
Schwarzenberg; HRE Prince of Schwarzenberg, Princely Landgrave of Klettgau, Count of Sulz, Duke of Krummau, Lord of Gimborn)	Barony; 1670: Principality	Franc	FR / PR	1429: Renamed from Seinsheim-Stephansberg; 1435: Acquired Hohenlandsberg; 1437: Partitioned into Schwarzenberg Franconian Line and Schwarzenberg-Hohenlandsberg; 1670: HRE Prince; Renamed from Schwarzenberg Franconian Line; 1674: Bench of Secular Princes; 1689: Acquired Klettgau; 1806: Klettgau to Baden, rest to Bavaria
Schwarzenberg Bavarian Line	Barony	Franc	FR	1528: Partitioned from Schwarzenberg-Hohenlandsberg; 1538: Partitioned into Schwarzenberg Elder Bavarian Line and Schwarzenberg Elder Bavarian Line
Schwarzenberg-Bierset and Champlon	Barony	n/a	n/a	c. 1510: Edmund I of Schwarzenberg Franconian Line created side line; fief of Liège; 1678: Extinct
Schwarzenberg Elder Bavarian Line	Barony; 1566: County	Franc	FR	1538: Partitioned from Schwarzenberg Bavarian Line; 1566: HRE Count; 1646: Extinct; to Schwarzenberg Franconian Line
Schwarzenberg Franconian Line; HRE Prince of Schwarzenberg, Princely Landgrave of Klettgau, Count of Sulz, Duke of Krummau, Lord of Gimborn)	Barony; 1599: County	Franc	FR	1437: Renamed from Schwarzenberg c. 1510: Side line Schwarzenberg-Bierset and Champlon created 1550: Acquired Gimborn; 1599: HRE Count; 1670: HRE Prince; renamed to Schwarzenberg
Schwarzenberg-Hohenlandsberg	Barony; 1566: County	Franc	FR	1437: Partitioned from Schwarzenberg; 1528: Partitioned into Schwarzburg Bavarian Line and itself 1566: HRE Count; 1588: Extinct; to Schwarzenberg Franconian Line
Schwarzenberg Younger Bavarian Line	Barony; 1566: County	Franc	FR	1538: Partitioned from Schwarzenberg Bavarian Line; 1566: HRE Count; 1618: Extinct; to Schwarzenberg Elder Bavarian Line
Schweidnitz (Świdnica)	Duchy	n/a	n/a	1308: Partitioned from Jauer; 1346: Inherited Jauer, renamed to Schweidnitz-Jauer
Schweidnitz-Jauer	Duchy	n/a	n/a	1346: Renamed from Schweidnitz after inheritance of Jauer; 1368: Extinct in male line; to Agnes of Austria; 1392: Extinct; to Bohemia; 1742: To Prussia
Schweinfurt	County; 941: Margraviate	n/a	n/a	9th Century?: First mentioned 941: HRE Margrave; 1003: Lost Nordgau to Bamberg; 1057: Extinct in male line 1104: Extinct; sold to Eichstätt
Schweinfurt	Imperial City	Franc	SW	1233: Imperial Free City; 1802: To Bavaria; 1810: To Würzburg; 1814: To Bavaria
Schwerin	Bishopric	Low Sax	EC	1053: Diocese established at Mecklenburg; 1162: Relocated to Schwerin; 1171: Acquired Bützow; 1181: HRE Prince of the Empire; 1648: Secularised as Principality for Mecklenburg-Schwerin, see below
Schwerin	Principality	Low Sax	PR	1648: Bishopric secularised as principality for Mecklenburg-Schwerin
Schwerin	County	n/a	n/a	1161: To Saxony; 1167: Gunzelin I of Hagen; fief of Saxony; 1180: Imperial immediacy 1203: Acquired Wittenburg and Boizenburg; 1279: Partitioned into Schwerin-Schwerin and Schwerin-Wittenburg
Schwerin-Boizenburg	County	n/a	n/a	1323: Partitioned from Schwerin-Wittenburg; 1349: Extinct; to Schwerin-Wittenburg
Schwerin-Schwerin	County	n/a	n/a	1279: Partitioned from Schwerin; 1344: Extinct; to Schwerin-Wittenburg
Schwerin-Wittenburg	County	n/a	n/a	1279: Partitioned from Schwerin; 1323: Partitioned into itself and Schwerin-Boizenburg; 1356: Side line Tecklenburg established 1357: Extinct; to Tecklenburg; 1358: Sold to Mecklenburg-Schwerin
Schwyz	Imperial Valley	Swab	n/a	972: To Lenzburg; 1173: To Habsburg; 1240: Free Imperial Valley; 1291: Joined the Swiss Confederation; 1648: Left the Empire as part of Switzerland
Seckau	Bishopric	Aust	EC	1218: Established; HRE Prince of the Empire; 16th Century: Removed from the Austrian Circle and Bench of Spiritual Princes as it did not possess immediate territory
Seeburg	County	n/a	n/a	c. 1036: Partitioned from Querfurt; 1182: Sold to Magdeburg; 1192: Extinct; 1287: Sold to Mansfeld Elder Line
Seinsheim	Lordship; 1580: Barony	Franc	FR	c. 1200: First mentioned c. 1260: Partitioned into Seinsheim-Stephansberg and Seinsheim-Erlach; Renamed from Seinsheim-Hohenkottenheim; HRE Baron c. 1590: Joined the Franconian Counts; 1591: Extinct; to Schwarzenberg
Seinsheim-Erlach	Lordship	n/a	n/a	c. 1260: Partitioned from Seinsheim c. 1360: Partitioned into itself and Seinsheim-Hohenkottenheim; 1433: Extinct; to Seinheim-Hohenkottenheim
Seinsheim-Hohenkottenheim	Lordship	n/a	n/a	c. 1360: Partitioned from Seinsheim-Erlach; 1580: Renamed to Seinsheim
Seinsheim-Stephansberg	Lordship	n/a	n/a	c. 1260: Partitioned from Seinsheim; 1420: Acquired Schwarzenberg; 1429: Renamed to Schwarzenberg
Sélestat; See: Schlettstadt	Imperial City			
Selz (Seltz)	Abbacy	El Rhin	n/a	991: Founded; 992: Imperial immediacy 1481: To the Palatinate; 1680: To France; 1692: Suppressed
Selz (Seltz)	Imperial City	n/a	n/a	1358: Free Imperial City; 1418: To the Palatinate; 1680: To France
Sickingen	Lordship	n/a	n/a	1289: First mentioned 1466: Acquired Merxheim; 1525: Acquired Schallodenbach; 1574: Partitioned into Sickingen-Schallodenbach, Sickingen-Landstuhl, Sickingen-Sickingen, Sickingen-Ebernburg and Sickingen-Hohenburg
Sickingen-Ebernburg	Lordship	n/a	n/a	1574: Partitioned from Sickingen; 1750: Sold to the Palatinate; 1768: Extinct
Sickingen-Hohenburg	County	Swab	SC	1574: Partitioned from Sickingen; 1606: HRE Baron; 1784: HRE Count; 1791: Joined the Swabian Counts; 1794: Left-bank territory to France; 1806: Remaining territory to Baden
Sickingen-Landstuhl	Lordship	n/a	n/a	1574: Partitioned from Sickingen; 1680: Extinct; divided between Sickingen-Hohenburg and Sickingen-Sickingen
Sickingen-Schallodenbach	Lordship	n/a	n/a	1574: Partitioned from Sickingen; 1684: Extinct
Sickingen-Sickingen	Lordship	n/a	n/a	1574: Partitioned from Sickingen; 1794: To France; 1834: Extinct
Siegburg; See: Michaelsberg	Abbacy			
Sigmaringen	County	n/a	n/a	1077: First mentioned 1083: Acquired Spitzenberg; 1147: To Helfenstein; 1200: To Helfenstein-Sigmaringen; 1258: To Helfenstein-Helfenstein; 1272: To Montfort-Bregenz; 1290: Sold to Austria; 1325: To Württemberg; 1399: To Werdenberg-Trochtelfingen; 1445: To Werdenberg-Heiligenberg; 1460: Made fief of Austria; 1471: To Werdenberg-Sigmaringen; 1508: To Werdenberg-Heiligenberg; 1534: To Hohenzollern-Hechingen; 1575: To Hohenzollern-Sigmaringen
Sinzendorf	Lordship	n/a	n/a	13th Century: First mentioned; ministerialis of Kremsmünster Abbey in Austria; 1404: Acquired Feyregg c. 1450: Partitioned into Sinzendorf-Feyregg and Sinzendorf-Fridau-Neuburg
Sinzendorf-Ernstbrunn; HRE Prince of Sinzendorf & Thannhausen, Burgrave of Winterrieden, Baron of Ernstbrunn	Lordship; 1610: Barony; 1653: County; 1803: Principality	El Rhin	WE	1592: Renamed from Sinzendorf-Feyregg; 1610: HRE Baron; 1653: Acquired Rheineck; HRE Count; 1796: Rheineck to France; 1803: Compensated with Winterrieden; HRE Prince; 1806: To Bavaria
Sinzendorf-Feyregg	Lordship	n/a	n/a	c. 1450: Partitioned from Sinzendorf; 1566: Sold Feyregg; 1592: Acquired Ernstbrunn; renamed to Sinzendorf-Ernstbrunn
Sinzendorf-Fridau-Neuburg	Lordship; 1610: Barony; 1654: County	Swab	SC	c. 1450: Partitioned from Sinzendorf; 1497: Acquired Fridau; 1610: HRE Baron; 1654: Acquired Neuburg; HRE Count; 1677: Acquired Thannhausen; Swabian Counts; 1680: Lost Neuburg to Austria; 1708: Sold Thannhausen to Stadion; 1767: Extinct
Sion (Sitten)	Bishopric	n/a	n/a	4th Century: Established at Martigny; 589: Relocated to Sion; 999: Acquired Valais; 1648: Left the Empire as an ally of Switzerland
Soest	Imperial City	Low Rhen	RH	1252: Free Imperial City; 1609: Awarded to Brandenburg, city refused 1616: To Brandenburg
Söflingen (Söfflingen)	Abbacy	Swab	SP	1258: Formed; 1773: Imperial immediacy 1803: To Bavaria; 1810: To Württemberg
Solms	County	n/a	n/a	1212: First mentioned 1258: Partitioned into Solms-Braunfels, Solms-Burg-Solms and Solms-Königsberg
Solms-Assenheim	County	Upp Rhen	WT	1699: Partitioned from Solms-Rödelheim; 1806: To the Grand Duchy of Hesse (Hesse-Darmstadt)
Solms-Baruth	County	Upp Rhen	WT	1627: Partitioned from Solms-Laubach c. 1676: Renamed to Solms-Rödelheim; appanages Solms-Laubach, Solms-Baruth and Solms-Wildenfels created
Solms-Baruth	County	n/a	n/a	c. 1676: Appanage created within Solms-Rödelheim; 1696: Appanage Solms-Baruth in Klitschdorf created
Solms-Baruth in Klitschdorf	County	n/a	n/a	1696: Appanage created within Solms-Rödelheim from Solms-Baruth
Solms-Braunfels	County; 1742: Principality	Upp Rhen	WT / PR	1258: Partitioned from Solms; 1324: Side line Solms-Ottenstein founded 1418: Acquired Münzenberg, Hungen, Lich and Laubach; 1420: Partitioned into itself and Solms-Lich; 1607: Partitioned into itself, Solms-Greifenstein and Solms-Hungen; 1693: Inherited by Solms-Greifenstein; 1696: Acquired Tecklenburg; 1707: Sold Tecklenburg to Prussia; 1742: HRE Prince; 1803: Bench of Princes; 1806: Braunfels and Greifenstein to Nassau, share of Limpurg to Württemberg, rest to Hesse-Darmstadt
Solms-Burg-Solms (Solms-Burgsolms)	County	n/a	n/a	1258: Partitioned from Solms; 1415: Extinct; to Solms-Braunfels
Solms-Greifenstein	County	Upp Rhen	WT	1607: Partitioned from Solms-Braunfels; 1693: Inherited and renamed to Solms-Braunfels
Solms-Hohensolms	County	Upp Rhen	WT	1562: Partitioned from Solms-Lich; 1718: Renamed to Solms-Hohensolms-Lich
Solms-Hohensolms-Lich	County; 1792: Principality	Upp Rhen	WT	1562: Partitioned from Solms-Lich; 1718: Renamed to Solms-Hohensolms-Lich; 1792: HRE Prince; 1806: To the Grand Duchy of Hesse (Hesse-Darmstadt)
Solms-Hungen	County	Upp Rhen	WT	1607: Partitioned from Solms-Braunfels; 1678: Extinct; to Solms-Greifenstein
Solms-Königsberg	County	n/a	n/a	1258: Partitioned from Solms; 1350: Königsberg to Hesse; 1364: Extinct; to Solms-Burg-Solms by marriage
Solms-Königstein	County	n/a	n/a	1741: Appanage created within Solms-Rödelheim from Solms-Wildenfels; 1792: Extinct; appanage abolished
Solms-Laubach	County	Upp Rhen	WT	1548: Partitioned from Solms-Lich; 1581: Partitioned into itself and Solms-Sonnewalde; 1627: Partitioned into Solms-Rödelheim, itself, Solms-Sonnewalde and Solms-Baruth; 1676: Extinct; to Solms-Baruth
Solms-Laubach	County	n/a	n/a	c. 1676: Appanage created within Solms-Rödelheim; 1696: Appanages Solms-Utphe and Solms-Wildenfels created
Solms-Lich	County	Upp Rhen	WT	1420: Partitioned from Solms-Braunfels; 1461: Acquired Assenheim and Rödelheim; 1537: Acquired Sonnewalde as fief of Lusatia; 1548: Partitioned into itself and Solms-Laubach; 1562: Partitioned into itself and Solms-Hohensolms; 1718: Extinct; to Solms-Hohensolms
Solms-Ottenstein	County	n/a	n/a	1324: Established by Henry V of Solms-Braunfels after acquisition of Ottenstein; 1408: To Münster; 1424: Extinct
Solms-Rödelheim	County	Upp Rhen	WT	1627: Partitioned from Solms-Laubach; 1635: Extinct; to Solms-Baruth c. 1676: Renamed from Solms-Baruth; 1699: Partitioned into itself and Solms-Assenheim; 1716: Extinct; to Solms-Assenheim
Solms-Sachsenfeld	County	n/a	n/a	1741: Appanage created within Solms-Rödelheim from Solms-Wildenfels
Solms-Sonnewalde	County	n/a	n/a	1581: Partitioned from Solms-Laubach; fief of Saxony; 1615: Extinct; to Solms-Laubach; 1627: Partitioned from Solms-Laubach; 1688: Partitioned into Solms-Sonnewalde-Pouch and Solms-Sonnewalde-Hillmersdorf
Solms-Sonnewalde-Pouch	County	n/a	n/a	1688: Partitioned from Solms-Sonnewalde; 1728: Partitioned into Solms-Sonnewalde-Wendisch Sohland, Solms-Sonnewalde-Kropstädt, itself and Solms-Sonnewalde-Rösa
Solms-Sonnewalde-Hillmersdorf	County	n/a	n/a	1688: Partitioned from Solms-Sonnewalde; 1718: Extinct; to Solms-Sonnewalde-Pouch
Solms-Sonnewalde-Kropstädt	County	n/a	n/a	1728: Partitioned from Solms-Sonnewalde-Pouch
Solms-Sonnewalde-Rösa	County	n/a	n/a	1728: Partitioned from Solms-Sonnewalde-Pouch
Solms-Sonnewalde-Wendisch Sohland	County	n/a	n/a	1728: Partitioned from Solms-Sonnewalde-Pouch
Solms-Utphe	County	n/a	n/a	1696: Appanage created within Solms-Rödelheim from Solms-Laubach; 1762: Extinct; appanage abolished
Solms-Wildenfels	County	n/a	n/a	c. 1676: Appanage created within Solms-Rödelheim; 1690: Extinct; appanage abolished 1696: Recreated as appanage within Solms-Rödelheim from Solms-Laubach; 1741: Appanages Solms-Sachsenfeld and Solms-Königstein split off
Solothurn	Imperial City	Swab	SW	1127: To Zähringen; 1218: Free Imperial City; 1353: Ally of the Swiss Confederation; 1481: Joined the Swiss Confederation; 1648: Left the Empire as part of Switzerland
Sombreffe (Sombreff, Someruff, Zimerauff)	Lordship	Low Rhen	WE	13th Century: First mentioned; to Orbais as fief of Brabant; 1397: Acquired Reken; 1446: To Vernembourg; 1501: Rekem to Pirmont; 1506: Acquired Reichenstein; 1523: Sold Reichenstein to Wied; 1543: To Culembourg
Sonnenberg	Lordship; 1463: County	n/a	n/a	1242: First mentioned; to Montfort; 1258: To Werdenberg-Sargans; 1342: To Werdenberg-Sargans-Sargans; 1455: Sold to Waldburg-Sonnenberg; 1474: Sold to Austria
Speyer	Bishopric	Upp Rhen	EC	614: First mentioned 7th Century: Acquired territory in the Speyergau; 1086: Acquired remainder of the Speyergau; 1792: Left-bank territory to France; 1803: Right-bank territory to Baden; 1816: Left-bank territory to Bavaria
Speyer	Imperial City	Upp Rhen	RH	1294: Free Imperial City; 1792: To France; 1816: To Bavaria
Spiegelberg	County	Low Rhen	WE	1200: First mentioned; to Poppenburg; 1217: Renamed from Poppenburg; 1225: Lost Spiegelberg to Homburg; 1300: Moved to Coppenbrügge; 1494: Acquired Pyrmont; 1568: To Lippe-Spiegelberg-Pyrmont; 1583: To Gleichen-Tonna; 1631: To Brunswick-Calenberg
Spoleto	Duchy	n/a	n/a	842: Invested on Guy of Nantes; 880: Partitioned into itself and Camerino; 1201: To the Papal States
Sponheim	County	n/a	n/a	1045: First mentioned c. 1234: Partitioned into Sponheim-Starkenburg, Sponheim-Heinsberg and Sponheim-Kreuznach
Sponheim-Bolanden	County	n/a	n/a	1277: Partitioned from Sponheim-Kreuznach; 1410: Extinct; to Nassau-Weilburg by marriage
Sponheim-Castellaun (Sponheim-Kastellaun)	County	n/a	n/a	1300: Partitioned from Sponheim-Kreuznach; 1340: Inherited and renamed to Sponheim-Kreuznach
Sponheim-Heinsberg	County	n/a	n/a	c. 1234: Partitioned from Sponheim; 1269: Partitioned into Heinsberg and Löwenburg
Sponheim-Kreuznach (Hither Sponheim; Vordere Sponheim)	County	n/a	n/a	c. 1234: Partitioned from Sponheim; 1277: Partitioned into itself, Sponheim-Bolanden and Sponheim-Neef; 1300: Partitioned into Sponheim-Castellaun and itself 1340: Inherited by Sponheim-Castellaun; 1417: Extinct; to Sponheim-Starkenburg
Sponheim-Neef	County	n/a	n/a	1277: Partitioned from Sponheim-Kreuznach; 1303: Extinct; to Metz-Scharfeneck
Sponheim-Sayn; See: Sayn	County			
Sponheim-Starkenburg (Farther Sponheim; Hintere Sponheim)	County	n/a	n/a	c. 1234: Partitioned from Sponheim; 1247: Acquired Sayn by marriage 1266: Partitioned into Sayn and itself 1437: Extinct; to Veldenz and Baden in condominium
Stadion	Lordship			1197: First mentioned; branch of Stain; 1392: Partitioned into Stadion Swabian Line and Stadion Alsatian Line
Stadion Alsatian Line	Lordship; 1686: Barony; 1705: County	Swab	SC	1392: Partitioned from Stadion; 1686: HRE Baron; 1696: Acquired Warthausen; 1705: Acquired Thannhausen; HRE Count; 1708: Joined the Swabian Counts; 1741: Partitioned into Stadion-Warthausen and Stadion-Thannhausen
Stadion Swabian Line	Lordship	n/a	n/a	1392: Partitioned from Stadion; 1585: Acquired Alberweiler; 1693: Extinct; to Stadion Alsatian Line
Stadion-Thannhausen	County	Swab	SC	1741: Partitioned from Stadion Alsatian Line; 1806: To Bavaria
Stadion-Warthausen	County	Swab	SC	1741: Partitioned from Stadion Alsatian Line; 1806: To Württemberg
Stain	Lordship; 1611: Barony; 1779: County	n/a	n/a	922: First mentioned 1611: HRE Baron; 1779: HRE Count; 1806: To Württemberg
Stargard	Lordship	n/a	n/a	1130: To Pomerania; 1236: To Brandenburg; 1304: To Mecklenburg as fief of Brandenburg; 1347: To Mecklenburg directly 1352: To Mecklenburg-Stargard; 1471: To Mecklenburg-Schwerin; 1520: To Mecklenburg-Güstrow; 1701: To Mecklenburg-Strelitz
Starhemberg	1679: HRE Count (Personalist); 1765: HRE Prince (Personalist)	n/a	FR	1679: Formed; 12th century: Family 1st mentioned
Starhemberg-Schaumburg-Wachsenberg; Prince of Starhemberg, Count of Schaumburg-Wachsenberg, etc.	1705: HRE Prince			Acquired County of Schaumburg-Wachsenberg
Stauf-Ehrenfels	Lordship; 1465: Barony; County	Bav	SC	1138: First mentioned; ministerialis of Regensburg; 1328: Lost Stauf to Nuremberg; 1385: Acquired Heimhof; 1427: Traded Heimhof for Köfering; 1432: Acquired Ehrenfels; 1448: Acquired Sünching and Triftlfing; 1465: HRE Baron; 1500: Acquired Schrotzhofen; 1552: First appearance at the Imperial Diet; 1568: Sold Ehrenfels to Palatinate-Neuburg; 1598: Extinct; remainder to Palatinate-Neuburg
Staufen	Lordship; 14th Century: Barony	Swab	SC	12th Century: First mentioned 13th Century: Imperial immediacy 1346: Acquired Werrach; Late 14th Century: HRE Baron; 1602: Extinct; to Austria
Principality of Stavelot-Malmedy (Stablo-Malmedy)	RA	Low Rhen	EC	648: Malmedy Abbey established 651: Stavelot Abbey established; ruled in union 747: Acquired territory from Carloman; 882: Acquired Blendef; 1793: To France; 1816: To the Netherlands; 1830: To Belgium
Stein	County; 1194: Rhinegraviate; 1350: Wild- and Rhinegraviate	n/a	n/a	1126: First mentioned; branch of Petra; 1194: Acquired 1/2 of the Rhinegraviate; 1220: Partitioned into Stein-Rheingrafenstein and Stein-Rheinberg; 1305/6: Reunited by Stein-Rheingrafenstein; 1350: Acquired Dhaun; 1419: Acquired Kyrburg; 1475: Acquired Salm in the Vosges, renamed to Salm
Stein-Rheinberg	Rhinegraviate	n/a	n/a	1220: Partitioned from Stein; 1305/6: Extinct; to Stein-Rheingrafenstein
Stein-Rheingrafenstein	Rhinegraviate	n/a	n/a	1220: Partitioned from Stein; 1223: Acquired remainder of the Rhinegraviate; 1281: Rhinegraviate to Mainz; 1305/6: Renamed to Stein
Stein am Rhein; See: St George in Stein	Abbacy			
Stein am Rhein	Imperial City	n/a	n/a	1457: Free Imperial City; 1484: To Zürich; 1648: Left the Empire as part of Switzerland
Stein zu Nassau	Lordship; 15th Century: Barony	n/a	n/a	1195: First mentioned; fief of Nassau; 1361: Acquired Schweighausen; 15th Century: HRE Baron; 1804: To Nassau
Steinfurt	Lordship; 1495: County	Low Rhen	WE	1129: First mentioned 1343: To Bishopric of Münster; 1357: Acquired Laer and part of their former territory 1421: To Bentheim; 1454: To Bentheim-Steinfurt; 1804: To Bentheim and Steinfurt; 1806: To Berg; 1811: To France; 1815: To Prussia
Sternberg	County	n/a	n/a	1243: Partitioned from Schwalenberg; 1377: Sold to Schaumburg; 1400: Half sold to Lippe; 1402: Extinct; rest sold to Lippe
Sternberg-Manderscheid	County	Low Rhen	WF	1780: Franz Joseph of Sternberg acquired Manderscheid-Blankenheim by marriage 1794: To France; 1803: Compensated with Schussenried and Weissenau; 1806: To Württemberg
Sternstein; See: Störnstein	Princely County			
Stetten	Lordship	n/a	n/a	1098: First mentioned; ministerialis of Comburg Abbey; 1336: Acquired Buchenbach; 1387: Acquired Tierburg; 1806: To Baden, Württemberg and Bavaria
Stolberg	County	Upp Sax	WT	1200: First mentioned at Artern; 1210: First mentioned at Stolberg; 1231: Partitioned into itself and Bockstädt; 1429: Acquired Wernigerode; 1535: Side line Stolberg-Königstein founded 1544: Partitioned into Stolberg-Stolberg and Stolberg-Wernigerode
Stolberg-Gedern	County; 1742: Principality	Upp Rhen	WT	1672: Partitioned from Stolberg-Wernigerode; 1710: Partitioned into itself, Stolberg-Wernigerode and Stolberg-Schwarza; 1742: HRE Prince; 1804: Extinct; to Stolberg-Wernigerode
Stolberg-Königstein	County	Upp Rhen	WT	1535: Established when Louis of Stolberg acquired Eppstein-Königstein; 1544: Acquired Rochefort; 1574: Rochefort to Löwenstein-Wertheim; 1581: Extinct; Königstein to Mainz; rest to Stolberg-Wernigerode
Stolberg-Schwarza	County	Upp Rhen	WT	1710: Partitioned from Stolberg-Gedern; 1743: Extinct; to Stolberg-Wernigerode
Stolberg-Stolberg	County	Upp Rhen	WT	1544: Partitioned from Stolberg; 1549: Acquired Schwarza; 1631: Extinct; to Stolberg-Wernigerode; 1645: Partitioned from Stolberg-Wernigerode; 1706: Partitioned into itself and Stolberg-Rossla; 1806: To Saxony
Stolberg-Rossla (Stolberg-Roßla)	County	Upp Rhen	WT	1572: Partitioned from Stolberg-Wernigerode; 1641: Extinct; to Stolberg-Wernigerode; 1706: Partitioned from Stolberg-Stolberg; 1730: Mediatised to Saxony
Stolberg-Wernigerode	County	Upp Rhen	WT	1544: Partitioned from Stolberg; 1572: Partitioned into itself and Stolberg-Rossla; 1581: Acquired Gedern and Baldern; 1645: Partitioned into itself and Stolberg-Stolberg; 1672: Partitioned into itself and Stolberg-Gedern; 1710: Extinct; to and partitioned from Stolberg-Gedern; 1714: Mediatised to Prussia; 1804: Inherited Gedern; 1806: Gedern to the Grand Duchy of Hesse (Hesse-Darmstadt)
Stolzenberg	Raugraviate	n/a	n/a	1172: Partitioned from Baumburg; 1358: Extinct; to Bolanden
Storkow	Lordship	n/a	n/a	1136: First mentioned; to Lusatia / Meissen; 1202: To Strele as fief of Landsberg; 1384: To Biberstein; 1518: To Lebus; 1556: To Brandenburg-Küstrin; 1575: To Brandenburg
Störnstein (Sternstein)	Lordship; 1641: Princely County	Bav	n/a	12th Century: First mentioned; to Stöhr; 14th Century: To Pflugk; To Heideck; 1355: Made fief of Bohemia c. 1548: Confiscated by Austria; 1562: To Lobkowitz as fief of Bohemia; 1641: HRE Princely Count; imperial immediacy; Bavarian Circle; 1806: To Bavaria
Strasbourg	Bishopric	Upp Rhen	EC	Before 343: Diocese established 775: Acquired territory 982: Imperial immediacy 1681: Left bank to France; 1803: Right bank to Baden
Strasbourg	Imperial City	n/a	n/a	1262: Free Imperial City (Strassburg; Straßburg); 1681: To France
Stühlingen	County; 1120: Landgraviate	Swab	SC	1084: First mentioned 1120: Lenzburg made HRE Landgraves; 1127: To Küssenberg; 1251: To Lupfen; 1584: To Pappenheim-Stühlingen; 1639: To Fürstenberg-Stühlingen; 1806: To Baden
Styria (Steiermark)	Duchy	Aust	n/a	970: First mentioned; Carinthian March under Carinthia; 1180: Margraviate to HRE Duke; 1192: To Austria; 1254: To Hungary; 1260: To Bohemia; 1276: To Austria; 1379: To Inner Austria; 1436: To Austria; 1564: To Inner Austria; 1619: To Austria
Sulz	County	Swab	SC	910: First mentioned 1252: Lost Sulz to Gerolseck; 1283: Lost Baar to Fürstenberg; 1410: Acquired Klettgau; 1482: Acquired Tiengen and Küssaburg; 1510: Acquired Vaduz, Blumenegg and Schellenberg; 1572: Partitioned into Sulz-Klettgau and Sulz-Vaduz
Sulz-Klettgau	County	Swab	SC	1572: Partitioned from Sulz; 1651: Sold Rafzerfeld to Zürich; 1698: Extinct; to Schwarzenberg by marriage
Sulz-Vaduz	County	Swab	SC	1572: Partitioned from Sulz; 1613: Sold Vaduz and Schellenberg to Hohenems; 1616: Sold Blumenegg to Weingarten Abbey; 1617: Extinct
Sulzbach	Imperial Village	n/a	n/a	1035: To Limburg Abbey; 1339: Free Imperial Village; 1450: Sold to Frankfurt; 1613: Free Imperial Village; 1804: To Nassau
Sulzbürg	Lordship	n/a	n/a	1217: First mentioned 1290: Renamed to Wolfstein
Sulzbürg and Pyrbaum (Sulzbürg-Pyrbaum)	Barony; 1673: County	Bav	FR	1522: Lords of Wolfstein raised to barons in their immediate territories of Sulzbürg and Pyrbaum; Bavarian Circle; 1673: HRE Count; Bench of Counts of Franconia; 1740: Succession dispute between Hohenlohe-Kirchberg and Giech, and Bavaria; 1768: To Bavaria
Sundgau; See Upper Alsace	Landgraviate			
Swabia	Duchy	n/a	n/a	c. 911: Formed from the former Stem Duchy of Alemannia; 1079: To Hohenstaufen; 1268: Discontinued with the extinction of Hohenstaufen; former fiefs granted immediacy 1289: Reestablished for Habsburgs; 1313: Discontinued
Swabia	Landvogtei	n/a	n/a	1541: Created from imperial and Austrian fiefs in Upper and Lower Swabia; 1740: Renamed to Altdorf; 1805: Gebrahofen to Bavaria, rest to Württemberg; 1810: Gebrahofen to Württemberg
Swabian Austria; See: Further Austria	Landgraviate			
Świdnica; See: Schweidnitz	Duchy			
