= Stöhr =

Stöhr is a German surname and it may refer to:

- Adolph Stöhr, German professor of philosophy
- Franz Stöhr, German politician
- Georg Stöhr, German fencer
- Henry Stöhr, German judoka
- Joachim Stöhr, German physicist
- Richard Stöhr, Austrian composer
- Willi Stöhr, German NSDAP official
- Wolfgang Stöhr, German ski jumper

== See also ==
- Stohr (disambiguation)
- Stoehr surname page
