= Stoehr =

Stoehr may refer to:

- Anna Stoehr (1900–2014), American supercentenarian
- Brooke Stoehr (born 1980), American basketball player and coach
- Isabelle Stoehr (born 1979), French squash player
- Nicole Stoehr of Devo 2.0, a quintet created for Walt Disney Records
- Taylor Stoehr (1931–2013), American literature professor

== See also ==
- Stoer
- Stohr (disambiguation)
