= Stohr =

Stohr is a German surname. Notable people with the surname include:

- Albert Stohr (1890–1961), German bishop
- Carlos Stohr (1931–2017), Czech-born Venezuelan painter
- Donald J. Stohr (1934–2015), American jurist
- Siegfried Stohr (born 1952), Italian racing driver

== Other ==
- Stohr Cars, American racing car manufacturer

== See also ==
- Stöhr
