= Stolberg-Stolberg =

German polity

County of Stolberg-Stolberg Grafschaft Stolberg-Stolberg
- 1548–1803
- Coat of arms
- Status: State of the Holy Roman Empire
- Capital: Stolberg
- Government: Principality
- Historical era: Middle Ages
  - Division of Stolberg: 19 March 1548
  - Creation of Stolberg-Wernigerode: 31 May 1645
  - Creation of Stolberg-Rossla: 1706
  - Under Vogterei of the Electorate of Saxony: 1730–38
  - Mediatised to Saxony: 1803
  - Awarded to Prussia: 1815
Preceded by
County of Stolberg
County of Wernigerode
Succeeded by
Stolberg-Wernigerode
Stolberg-Rossla
Electorate of Saxony

Coat of arms

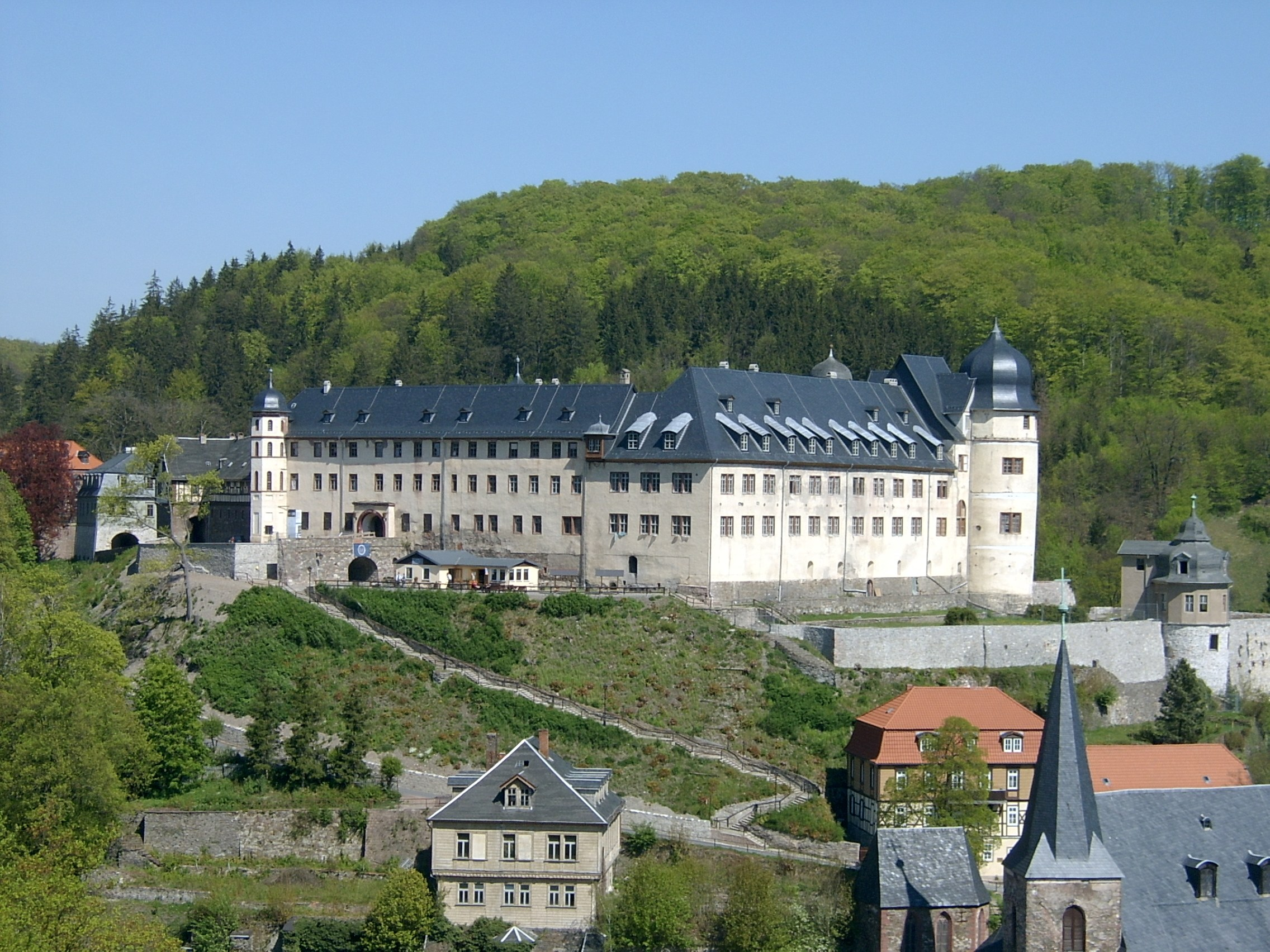
Stolberg Castle

Stolberg-Stolberg was a county of the Holy Roman Empire located in the southern Harz region. Its capital was the town of Stolberg, now in Saxony-Anhalt, Germany. It was ruled by a branch of the House of Stolberg.

In 1429, the County of Wernigerode passed to the Counts of Stolberg, who ruled Wernigerode through a personal union. In 1548, the line was split between a Harz line (Stolberg-Stolberg) and a Rhenish line which had possessions in Rochefort (Stolberg-Rochefort) and Königstein im Taunus (Stolberg-Königstein).

With the death of Count Wolf Georg zu Stolberg in 1631, Stolberg-Stolberg was inherited by members of the Rhenish line. On 31 May 1645, Stolberg-Stolberg was divided between a senior Stolberg-Wernigerode line and a junior Stolberg-Stolberg line. In 1706, Stolberg-Stolberg divided again, with Stolberg-Rossla being created.

Stolberg-Stolberg was forced to recognize the suzerainty of the Electorate of Saxony in 1738. It was awarded to the Kingdom of Prussia in the 1815 Congress of Vienna.

The children of Fürsten and Erbprinzen zu Stolberg-Wernigerode bore the title of Prince[ss] (Prinz[essin]) zu Stolberg-Wernigerode and were styled Serene Highness. Other members of this line bore the title of Count[ess] (Graf/Gräfin) zu Stolberg-Wernigerode, with the style of Illustrious Highness.

== Rulers of Stolberg-Stolberg ==
=== Counts of Stolberg-Stolberg ===
- Christoph Friedrich (1704-1738)
- Christoph Ludwig II (1738-1761), son
- Karl Ludwig (1761-1815), son, mediatised in 1803
- Joseph (1815-1839), son
- Alfred (1839-1903), Fürst from 1893 on

=== Princes of Stolberg-Stolberg ===
- Alfred, 1st Prince 1893-1903 (1820-1903)
  - Wolffgang, 2nd Prince 1903 (1849-1903)
    - Wolff-Heinrich, 3rd Prince 1903-1972 (1903-1972)
      - Jost-Christian, 4th Prince 1972-present (b.1940)
        - Christoph, Hereditary Prince of Stolberg-Stolberg (b.1982)
        - Prince Heinrich-Victor (b.1986)
