= Stolberg-Rossla =

County in the Holy Roman Empire

County of Stolberg-Rossla Grafschaft Stolberg-Rossla
- 1706–1803
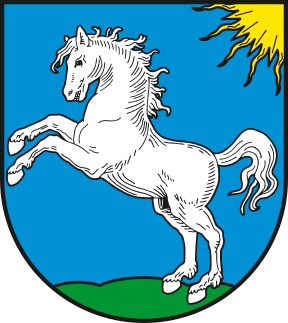
- Coat of arms
- Status: State of the Holy Roman Empire
- Capital: Rossla
- Government: Principality
- Historical era: Early Modern era
  - Partitioned from Stolberg-Stolberg: 1706
  - Under Vogterei of the Electorate of Saxony: 1738
  - Mediatised to Saxony: 1803
  - Awarded to Prussia: 1815
Preceded by	Succeeded by
Stolberg-Stolberg	Electorate of Saxony

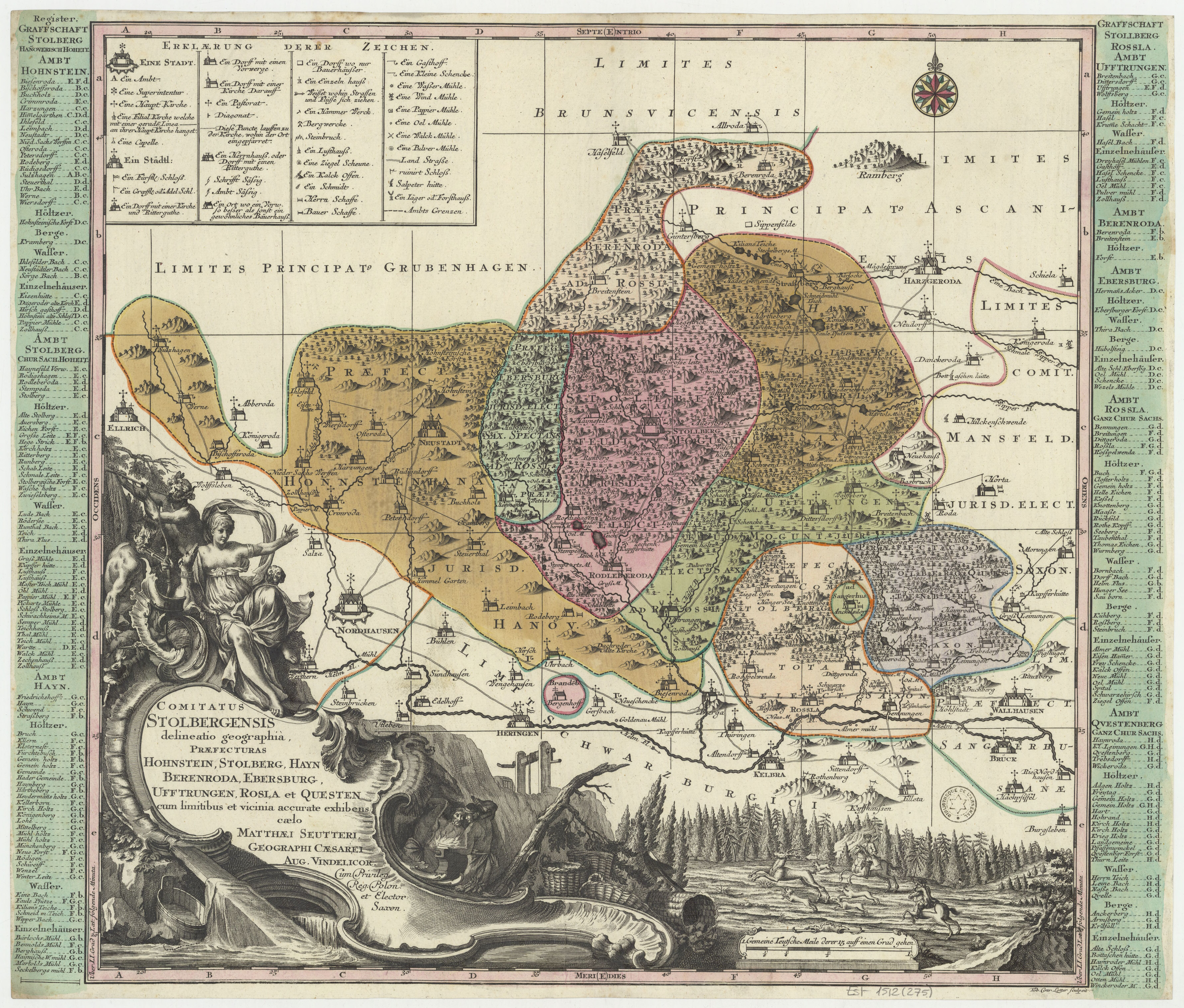
Rossla, among other Stolberg territories

The County of Stolberg-Rossla (German: Grafschaft Stolberg-Roßla) was a county of the Holy Roman Empire. Its capital was Rossla, now in Saxony-Anhalt, Germany. The territory was owned and ruled by a branch of the House of Stolberg from 1341 until 1803, when the county became mediatised by the Electorate of Saxony.

Stolberg-Rossla emerged as a partition of Stolberg-Stolberg in 1706. It was forced to recognize the suzerainty of the Electorate of Saxony in 1738. Stolberg-Rossla was mediatised to Saxony in 1803, but passed to the Kingdom of Prussia in 1815. Although the territory was subsequently administered within the Province of Saxony, the counts retained their possessions until 1945. In 1893 they were raised to the rank of Princes of Stolberg-Rossla.

== Rulers of Stolberg-Rossla ==
=== Counts of Stolberg-Rossla ===
- Christoph Ludwig I, Count of Stolberg-Stolberg (1634–1704)
  - Christoph Friedrich, Count of Stolberg-Stolberg (1672–1736)
  - Jost Christian, 1st Count of Stolberg-Roßla 1706–1739 (1676–1739)
    - Friedrich Botho, 2nd Count 1739–1768 (1714–1768)
      - Heinrich Christian Friedrich, 3rd Count 1768–1778 (1747–1810)
      - Johann Wilhelm Christoph, 4th Count 1778–1826 (1748–1826)
      - August, 5th Count 1826–1846 (1768–1846)
        - Karl Martin, 6th Count 1846–1870 (1822–1870)
          - Botho, 7th Count 1870–1893 (1850–1893)

=== Princes of Stolberg-Rossla ===
- Botho, 1st Prince 1893 (1850–1893)
  - Jost Christian, 2nd Prince 1893–1916 (1886–1916)
  - Christoph Martin, 3rd Prince 1916–1949 (1888–1949)
    - Johann Martin, 4th Prince 1949–1982 (1917–1982)

== Stolberg-Wernigerode Heir ==
Prince Alexander of Stolberg-Wernigerode (b.1967), the only son of Prince Elger of Stolberg-Wernigerode (b. 1935) and his wife, Baroness Karin von Düring (b. 1934), was adopted by his distant cousin, Prince Johann Martin of Stolberg-Roßla (1917–1982) and upon his death became the 5th Prince of Stolberg-Rossla. Alexander is married to Caroline Jansen (b. 1968) and has a son, Prince Ludwig Botho Elgar Wilhelm Martin (b.2008), and three daughters: Princess Juliana (2002), Princess Auguste (b. 2004) and Princess Emilia (b. 2006).

== See also ==
- House of Stolberg
