= Burgraviate of Rheineck =

State in the Holy Roman Empire

- Coat of arms
- Status: State of the Holy Roman Empire
- Government: Burgraviate
- Burgrave
- Historical era: Medieval & Early modern

The Burgraviate of Rheineck was a burgraviate of the Holy Roman Empire. It was a member of the Upper Rhenish Circle.
