= Scheuerberg =

Coordinates: 49°11′50″N 9°15′10″E

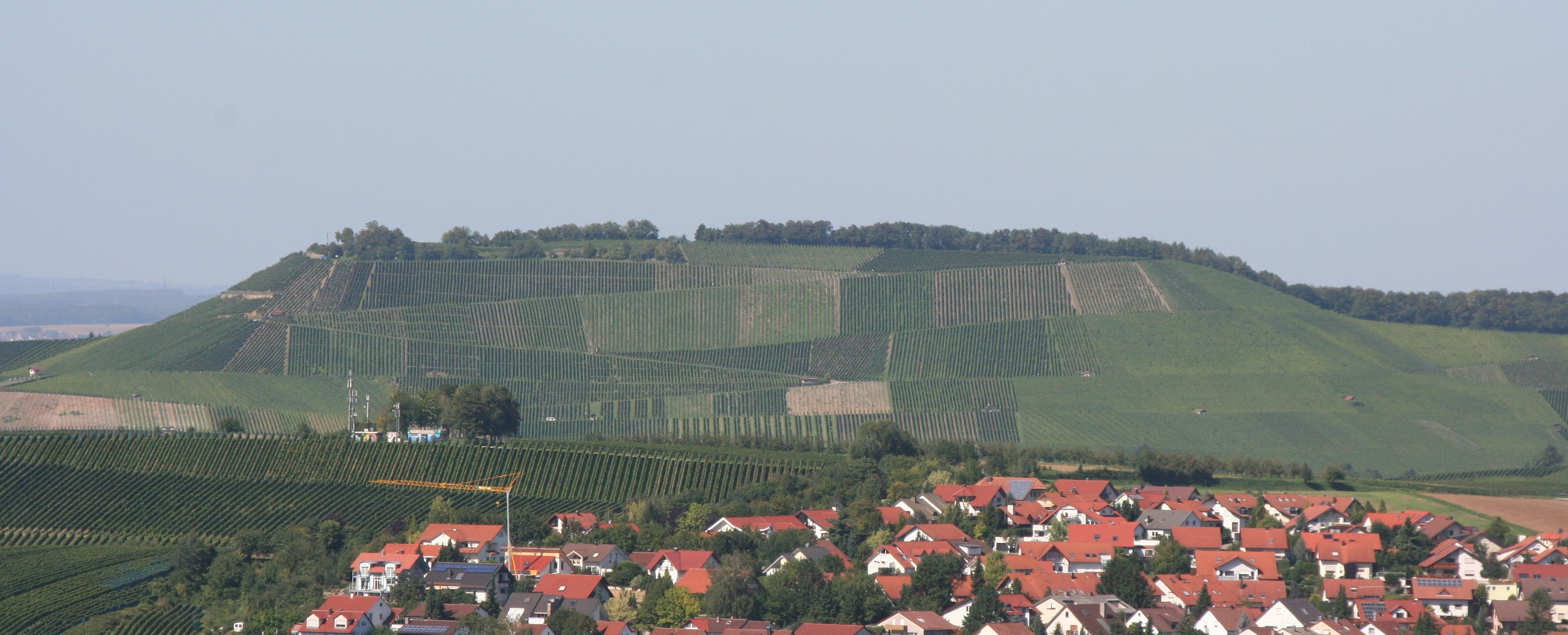
- The Scheuerberg from the southeast; in the foreground Erlenbach.

Highest point
- Elevation: 310.2 m (1,018 ft)

Geography
- Location: Baden-Württemberg, Germany

Scheuerberg is a mountain of Baden-Württemberg, Germany.
