= St. George's Abbey, Stein am Rhein =

Church and former Benedictine monastery in Switzerland

Coordinates: 47.66°N 8.86°E

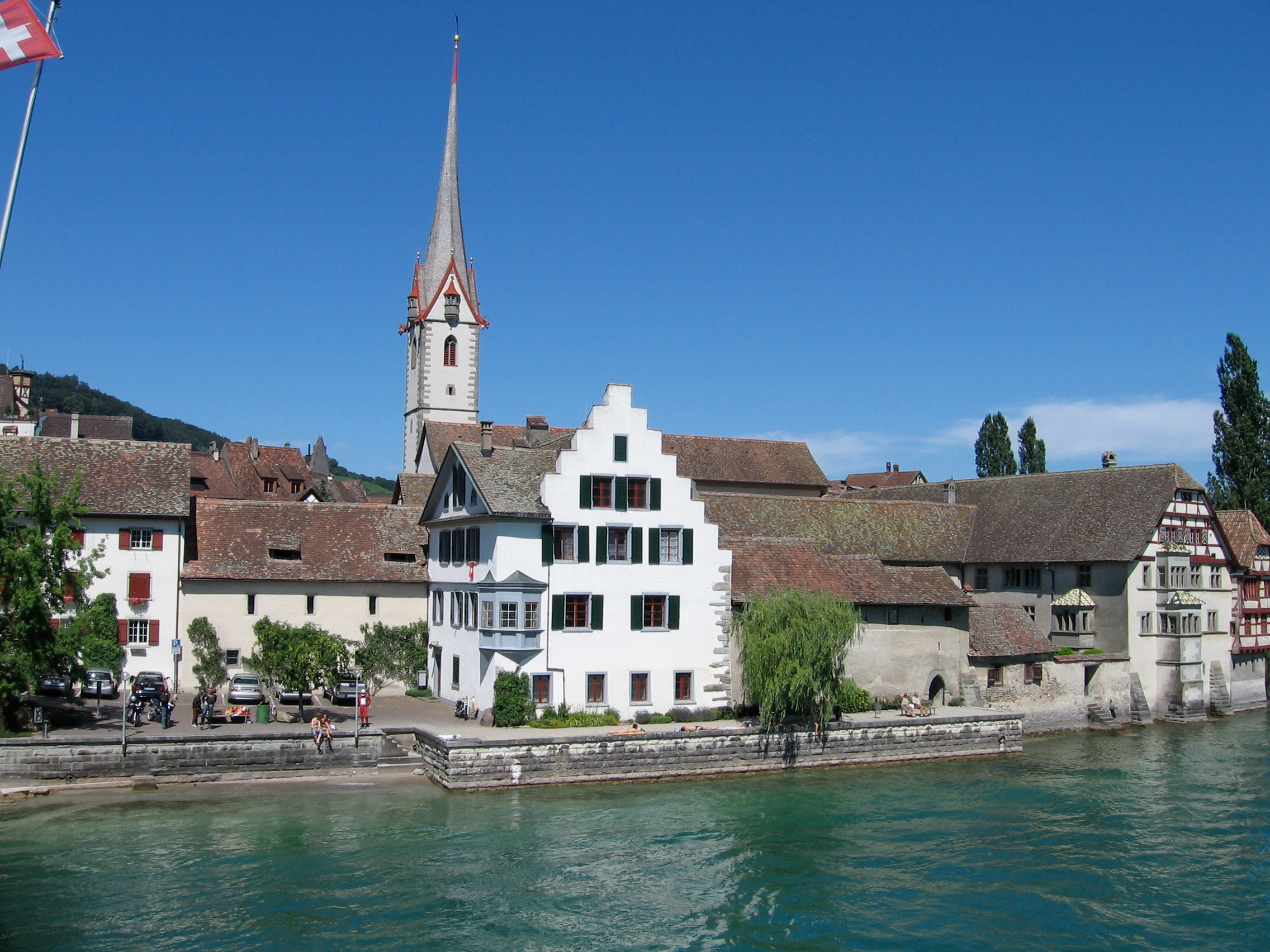
St. George's Abbey

St. George's Abbey, Stein am Rhein (Kloster Sankt Georgen, Stein am Rhein) was a Benedictine monastery in Stein am Rhein, Switzerland.

== History ==
In or around 1007, Emperor Henry II moved St. George's Abbey from its former location on the Hohentwiel in Singen to Stein am Rhein — at that time, little more than a small fishing village on the Rhine. The move was a means to strengthen his presence at this strategic point, where major roads and river routes intersected. He gave the abbots extensive rights over Stein and its trade so that they could develop it commercially. In this, they were very successful and Stein am Rhein rapidly became a flourishing and prosperous town which, in the 15th century, was itself (if briefly) granted reichsfrei status.

The abbey also prospered and, in the 15th century, completely rebuilt its premises, which remain a significant example of late Gothic architecture in the region.

The last and greatest abbot, David von Winkelsheim, who came to power in 1499, completed the building works and added a spectacular suite of Renaissance frescoes that are among the earliest known in Northern Europe.

Under the Reformation however, the abbey was secularised and its assets taken over by Zürich. Abbot von Winkelsheim negotiated a settlement with the Zürich authorities, whereby, although control of the abbey was handed over to them, he and the remaining monks would be allowed to remain on the premises until their deaths. Zürich, however, suspected the abbot of collusion with the Habsburgs and locked him up in his new rooms. He was able to escape to Radolfzell, but died shortly after, in 1526.

The Gottfried Keller Foundation aims in the acquisition of major works from Switzerland and abroad, to entrust them as loans to Swiss museums or to return them to their original locations. Among other, the foundation acquired the St. Georgen Abbey. The collection comprises more than 8,500 paintings, sculptures and other art objects in around 110 museums respectively locations in Switzerland.

== Buildings ==
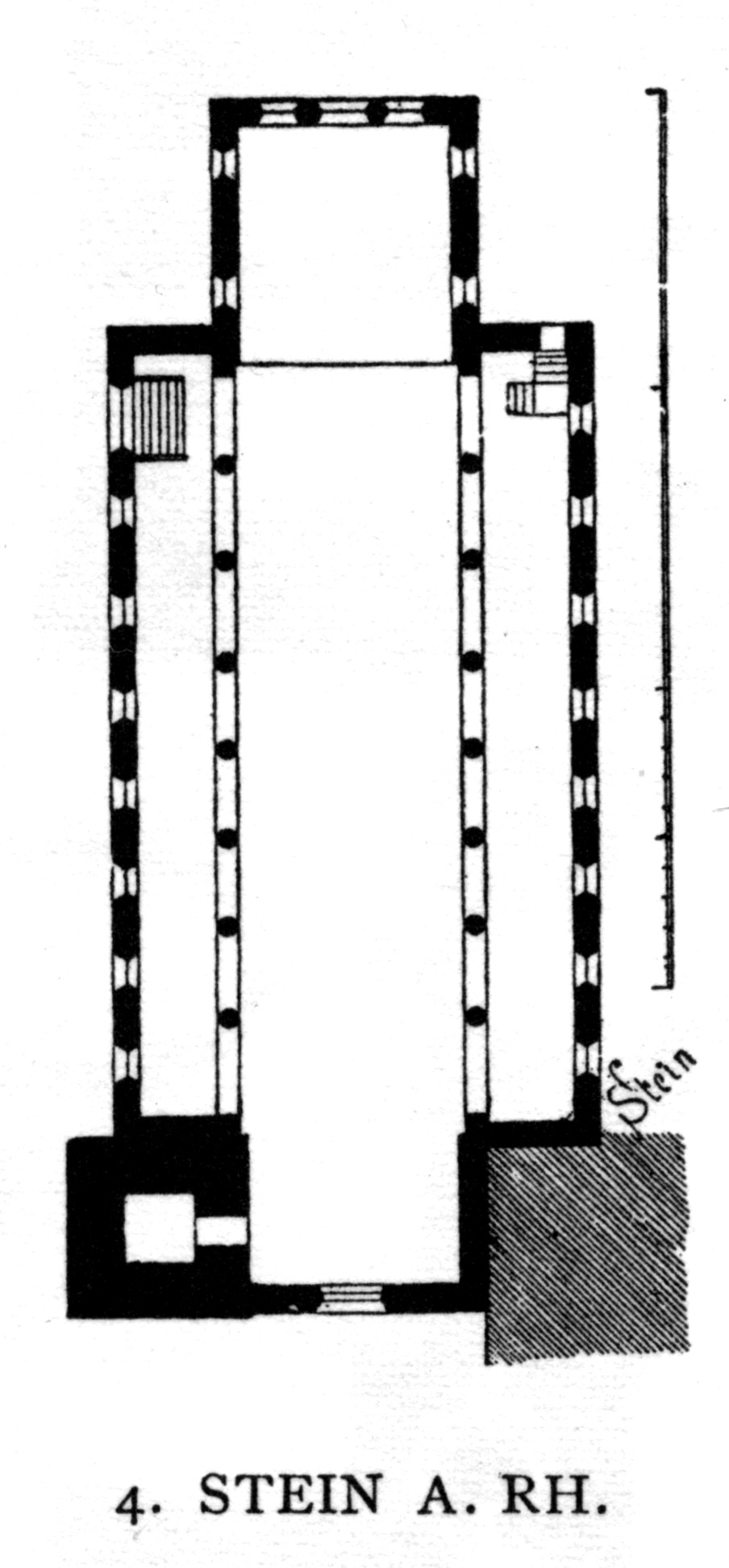
Church plan

The buildings remained unharmed until the 19th century, when they were used by their owners for a number of industrial purposes, during which they suffered considerable damage. A Protestant pastor acquired them, and left them in trust for the community, thus saving them. Since 1945, they have accommodated a museum.

The banqueting hall, or Festsaal, containing the frescoes commissioned by David von Winkelsheim, and the cloisters are of especial interest in a building complex.

The abbey church, which dates predominantly from the 12th century, has also survived intact, and is now the (Protestant) parish church.

== Abbots ==
List of Catholic Abbots of St. George's Abbey

- 1005-???? Trudewingus?
- 1125-1141 Otto de Almundishart
- ????-1170 Burcardus
- ????-1194 Lütoldus
- c.1200 Radulphus
- c.1251 Heinricus
- c.1255 Rudolphus I
- ????-1291 Eberhardus
- ????-1296 Conradus I
- ????-1315 Friedrich I
- ????-1341 Rudolf II
- 1343-1379 Friedrich von Bohlingen
- 1383-1412 Konrad II Goldast
- 1413-1444 Johannes I Send
- 1444-1460 Johannes II Singer
- 1461-1490 Jodocus Krum
- 1490-1499 Johannes III Martin
- 1499-1525 David von Winkelsheim

== Sources ==
- Stein am Rhein municipal website
- Private travel site
- Digital Library for the Decorative Arts and Material Culture: "The Craftsman" (Feb 1910), Hugo Erichson on the abbey buildings at Stein am Rhein
