= Von Klingen family =

Medieval baronial family from Thurgau, Switzerland

von Klingen von Altenklingen, von Hohenklingen
- Baronial family
- Country: Holy Roman Empire
- Current region: Thurgau, Switzerland
- Founded: 12th century
- Founder: Walter von Klingen
- Final ruler: Ulrich von Hohenklingen
- Estates: Altenklingen Castle, Hohenklingen Castle, Klingnau
- Dissolution: 1444/1445
- Cadet branches: Altenklingen branch, Hohenklingen branch, Klingnau branch

The von Klingen family (and its two main lineages of von Altenklingen and von Hohenklingen) were a baronial family from Thurgau documented from the 12th to the 15th centuries. Their possessions were scattered across a wide radius around Altenklingen Castle (in Wigoltingen) northwest of the Ottenberg, along Lower Lake Constance and around Hohenklingen Castle near Stein am Rhein. The family inhabited the latter castle until the 15th century as bailiffs of the town and advocates of St. George's Abbey.

== History ==
=== Origins ===
The first known representative of the family was Walter, who according to uncertain tradition may have been advocate of St. George's Abbey around 1150. He appears in 1169 as a witness of the Bishop of Constance, from whom the von Klingen held numerous fiefs. Ulrich and Walther, probably his sons, are also mentioned as advocates of St. Georgen in 1170. The lineages of Altenklingen and Hohenklingen, whose distinction only becomes apparent after 1250, apparently trace back to them.

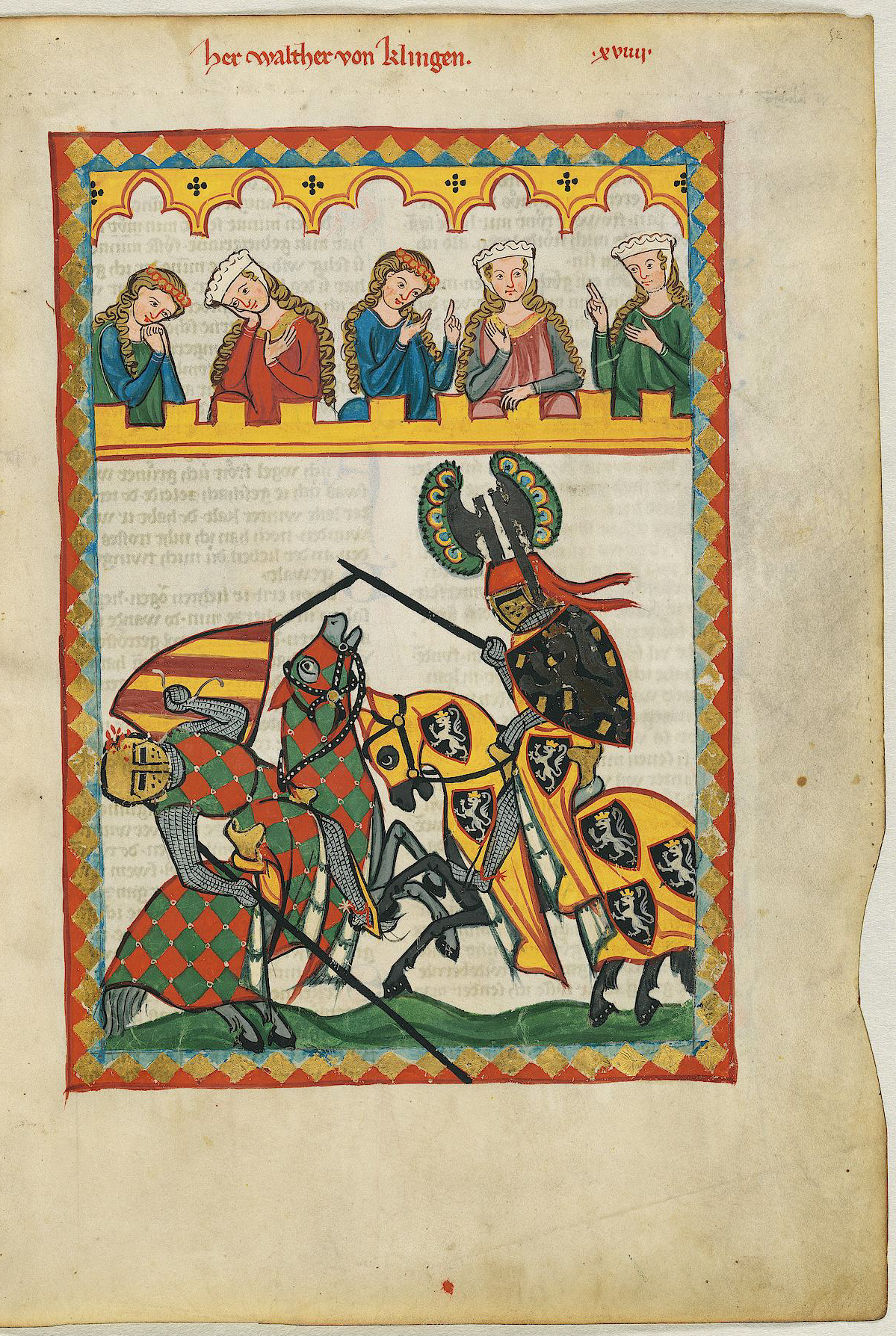
Walther von Klingen in the Codex Manesse, c. 1304

The thesis defended by Johann Adam Pupikofer regarding the kinship of the von Klingen with the lords of Märstetten, who lived at the end of the 11th century, remains controversial due to lack of sources. Before 1300, the family's genealogy presents uncertainties, due notably to the almost exclusive use of the names Ulrich and Walther.

=== Foundation of Klingnau ===
Ulrich, son of the aforementioned Ulrich, founded the town of Klingnau in 1239 on lands along the Aare river that he had partly inherited through his wife Ita from his father-in-law Walter von Tegernfeld, and partly obtained through an exchange with St. Blaise Abbey in the Black Forest. His sons Ulrich and Walter divided the family's goods before 1253, with the first taking the Thurgau possessions and rights as well as Altenklingen, and the second taking the Tegernfeld properties and Klingnau.

The Klingnau branch could not maintain itself. Walter sold the town to the Bishop of Constance in 1269, disposed of the rest of his Aargau goods (notably in favor of St. Blaise) before 1271, and settled in Basel, where he is often mentioned in the entourage of Rudolf I of Habsburg. The family drew closer to the Habsburgs from the 1280s onward, but managed to maintain a relatively independent position until the mid-14th century, thanks to their situation on the margins of Habsburg influence.

=== Later medieval period and extinction ===
The Altenklingen lineage was able to maintain a certain comfort until its disappearance in 1394. The most important sale at the beginning of the 14th century included the castles of Mammern and Neuburg (St. Gall Abbey fiefs), ceded to the lords von Kastell. In contrast, the Hohenklingen lineage, which had divided before 1347 into two branches - the Hohenklingen-Bechburg and the Hohenklingen-Brandis - had to abandon a major part of its goods in the second half of the 14th century due to economic and political pressures.

Ulrich, judge at the supreme court of Thurgau (a position frequently held on behalf of Austria by representatives of this branch from 1318), and his brother Walter sold to Austria their rights over half of Stein am Rhein and St. Georgen, as well as the castle and lordship of Hohenklingen. They took back the castle and town as pledges and entered Habsburg service.

The Altenklingen lineage only joined the Austrian administration with Walter, its last representative, who was Habsburg bailiff in Aargau, Thurgau, the Black Forest, and Sundgau (1381-1385). His own goods returned after his death in 1394 to the Bussnang family, and to a lesser extent to the Bürglen, Landenberg, and Enne families. His coat of arms and the imperial fiefs he held, notably the lordship of Matzingen inherited in 1350, and the bailiwicks of Oberwinterthur and Wiesendangen, passed to Walter von Hohenklingen.

Walters' daughter Fides became abbess of Fraumünster, later followed by her sister Anastasia. During the 15th century, Ulrich, son of Walter and brother of Anastasia, experienced increasing financial difficulties and had to cede in 1433 the other half of the lordship of Hohenklingen and Stein am Rhein to Kaspar von Klingenberg. Ulrich, the last representative of the family, died in 1444/1445. The Counts of Fürstenberg were his principal heirs.

== Coat of arms ==
The heraldic description (blazon) of the family's original coat of arms shows: Sable, semé of argent shingles, a lion rampant argent crowned or and langued gules; for a crest, on a helm with argent and sable mantling, a demi-lion argent crowned or and langued gules, behind which is placed a notched red mantlet whose points are decorated with peacock feathers.

The coat of arms of the von Klingen in the Codex Manesse also shows on sable the argent lion, but the shingles are or; on the helm with gules mantling two outward-facing argent (iron) axes; the cutting edges of the axe blades are decorated with peacock feathers.

After the division of the family around 1225, the Hohenklingen branch chose its own coat of arms, showing a five-leaved oak branch on an or field and a gules disc framed with argent scales as the helm ornament.

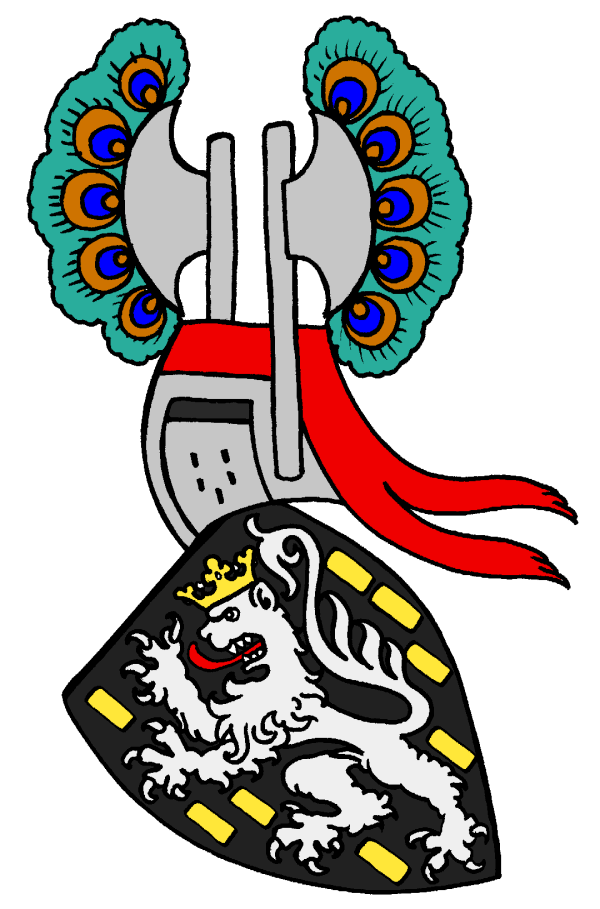
Coat of arms of Walter von Klingen in the Codex Manesse (c. 1300–1340)

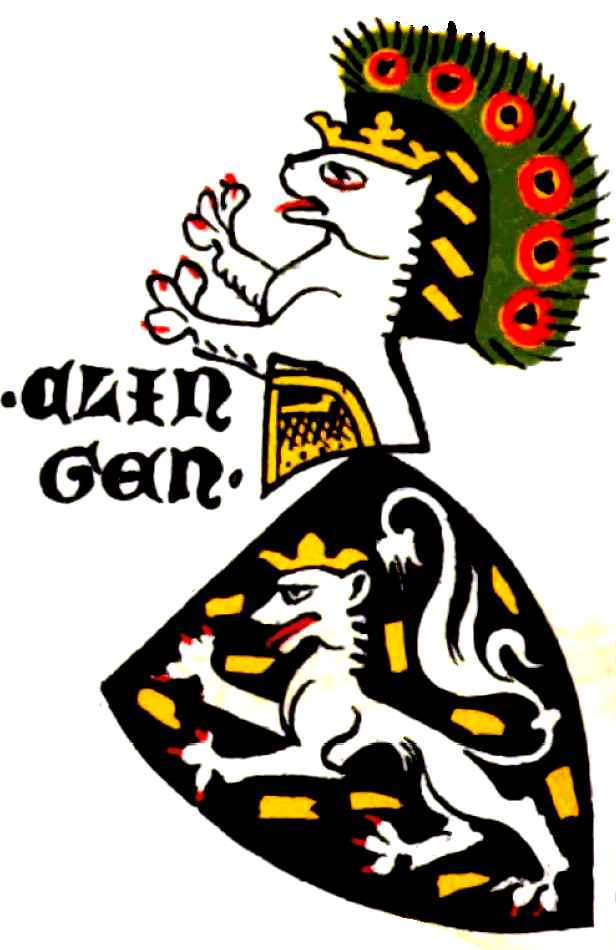
Coat of arms of the von Klingen in the Zürich armorial (c. 1340)

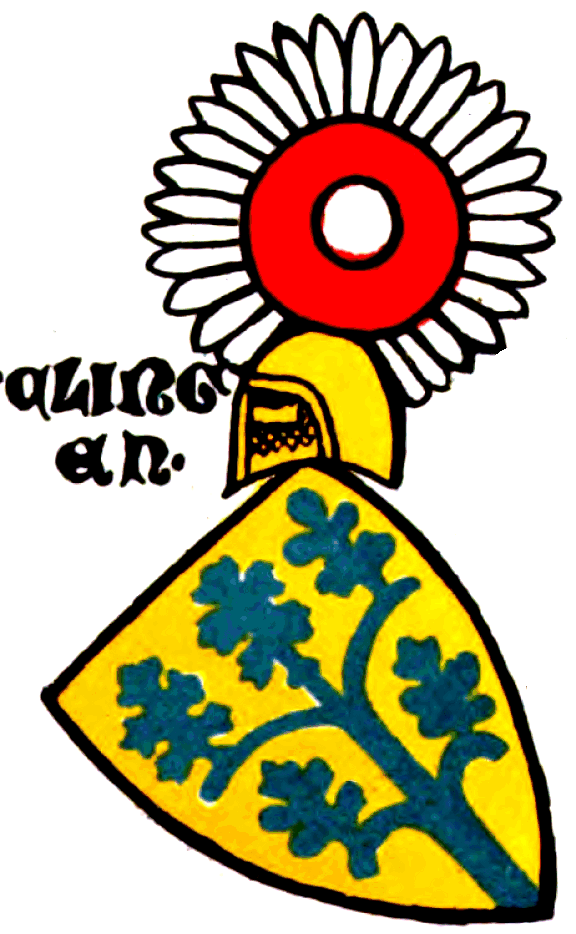
Coat of arms of the (Hohen-)Klingen (1225) in the Zürich armorial (c. 1340)

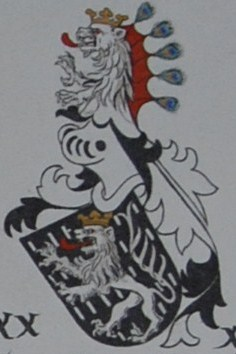
Barons von Klingen, Battle of Sempach Chapel

== Bibliography ==
- J.A. Pupikofer, Geschichte der Freiherren von Klingen zu Altenklingen, Klingnau und Hohenklingen, 1869
- O. Stiefel, Geschichte der Burg Hohenklingen und ihrer Besitzer, 1921
- W. Merz, F. Hegi, ed., Die Wappenrolle von Zürich, 1930, 28-29
- O. Mittler, Geschichte der Stadt Klingnau, 1239-1939, 1947 (2nd ed. 1967)
- Sablonier, Adel
- GHS, 4, 169-170
