= Hohenklingen Castle =

Castle in Stein am Rhein, Switzerland

- Schloss Hohenklingen
- Stein am Rhein
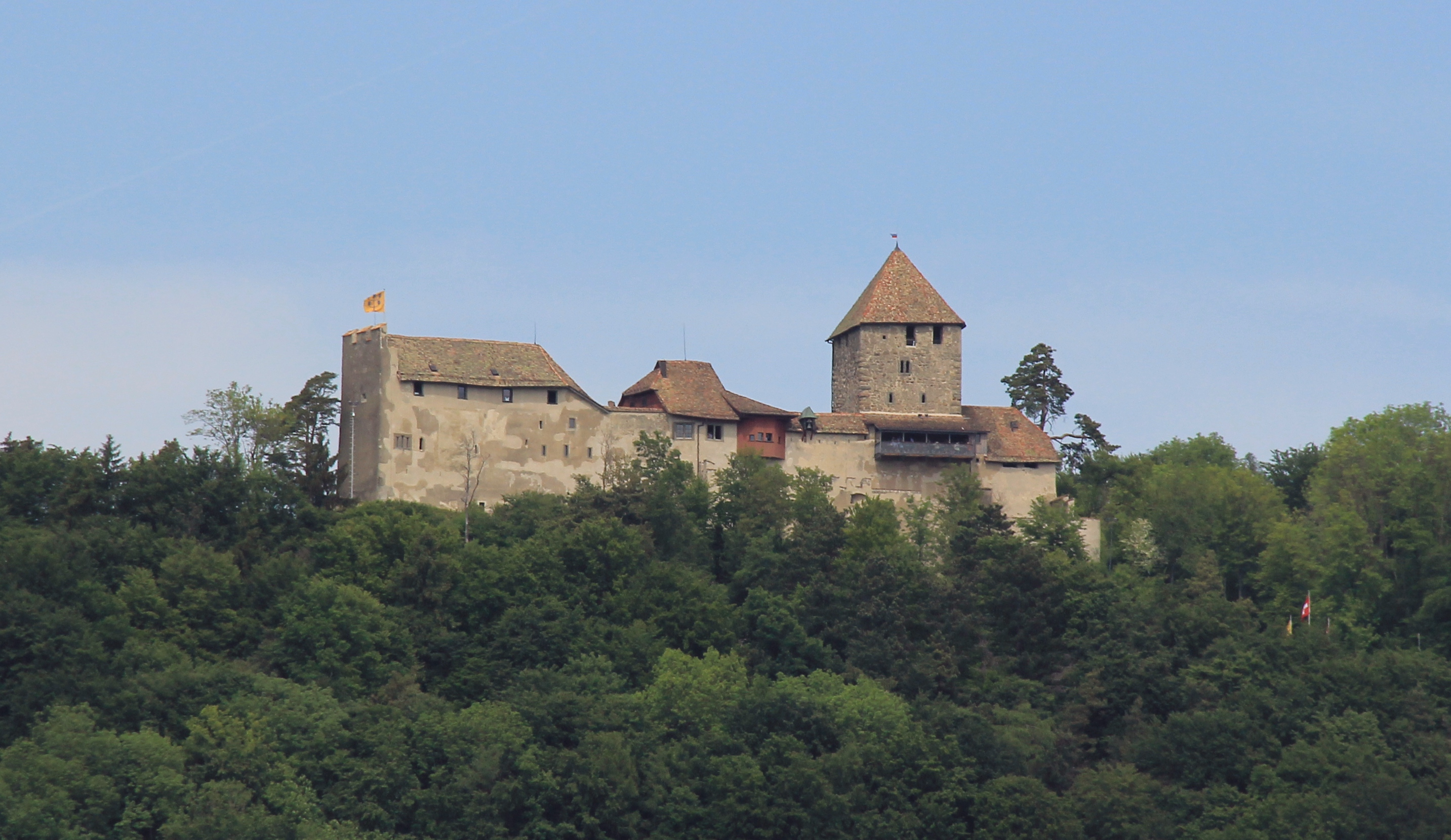
- Hohenklingen Castle, after 2008 renovation

Site information
- Type: hill castle, spur castle
- Code: CH-SH
- Condition: Generally preserved

Location
- Coordinates: 47°40′0″N 8°51′30″E

Site history
- Built: 1225

Garrison information
- Occupants: Freiherren

Airfield information
- Elevation: 594 m above the sea AMSL

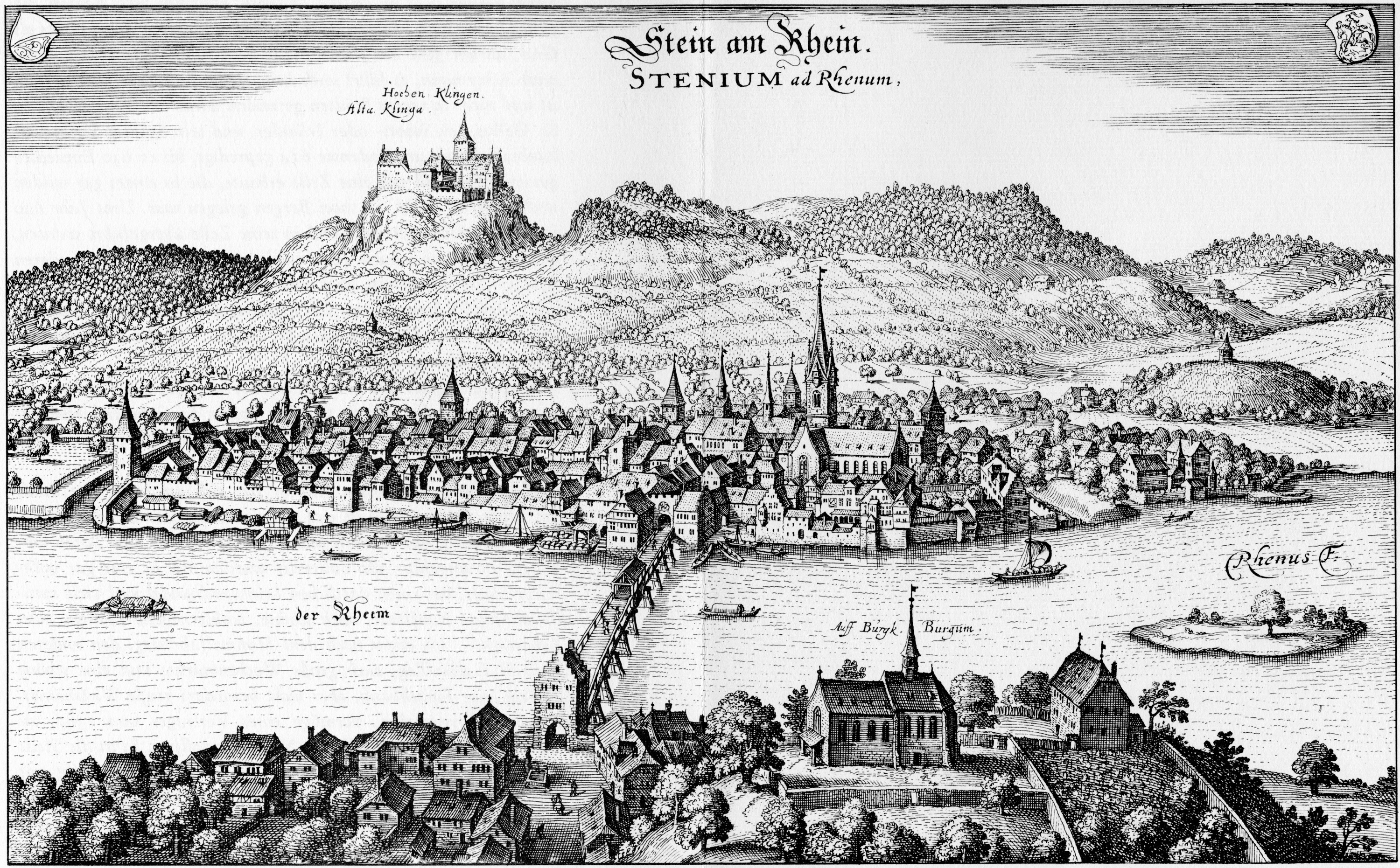
Stein am Rhein 1642

Hohenklingen Castle is a castle in the municipality of Stein am Rhein of the Canton of Schaffhausen in Switzerland.

It is a Swiss heritage site of national significance.

Hohenklingen is nominated for the Swiss Location Award 2021.

The Castle has been spared from war damage in the course of its history. Its silhouette with walls and roofs still corresponds to the medieval appearance from 1200 to 1422.

Hohenklingen was the first toll castle at the river Rhine and is about 5 miles away from the Rhine Falls. Stein am Rhein is also the last town before the German Border. Lake Constance ends here and is part of the border between Switzerland and Germany, with Germany on the north bank and Switzerland on the south, except both sides are Swiss in Stein am Rhein, where the High Rhine flows out of the lake.

== See also ==
- List of castles in Switzerland
