= Ottenberg =

Mountain in Bavaria, Germany

- Location within Bavaria

Highest point
- Elevation: 588 m (1,929 ft)
- Coordinates: 49°19′N 11°29′E

Geography
- Location: Bavaria, Germany

The Ottenberg is a hill in the Franconian Jura in Bavaria, Germany.
