= Stein am Rhein =

- Municipality
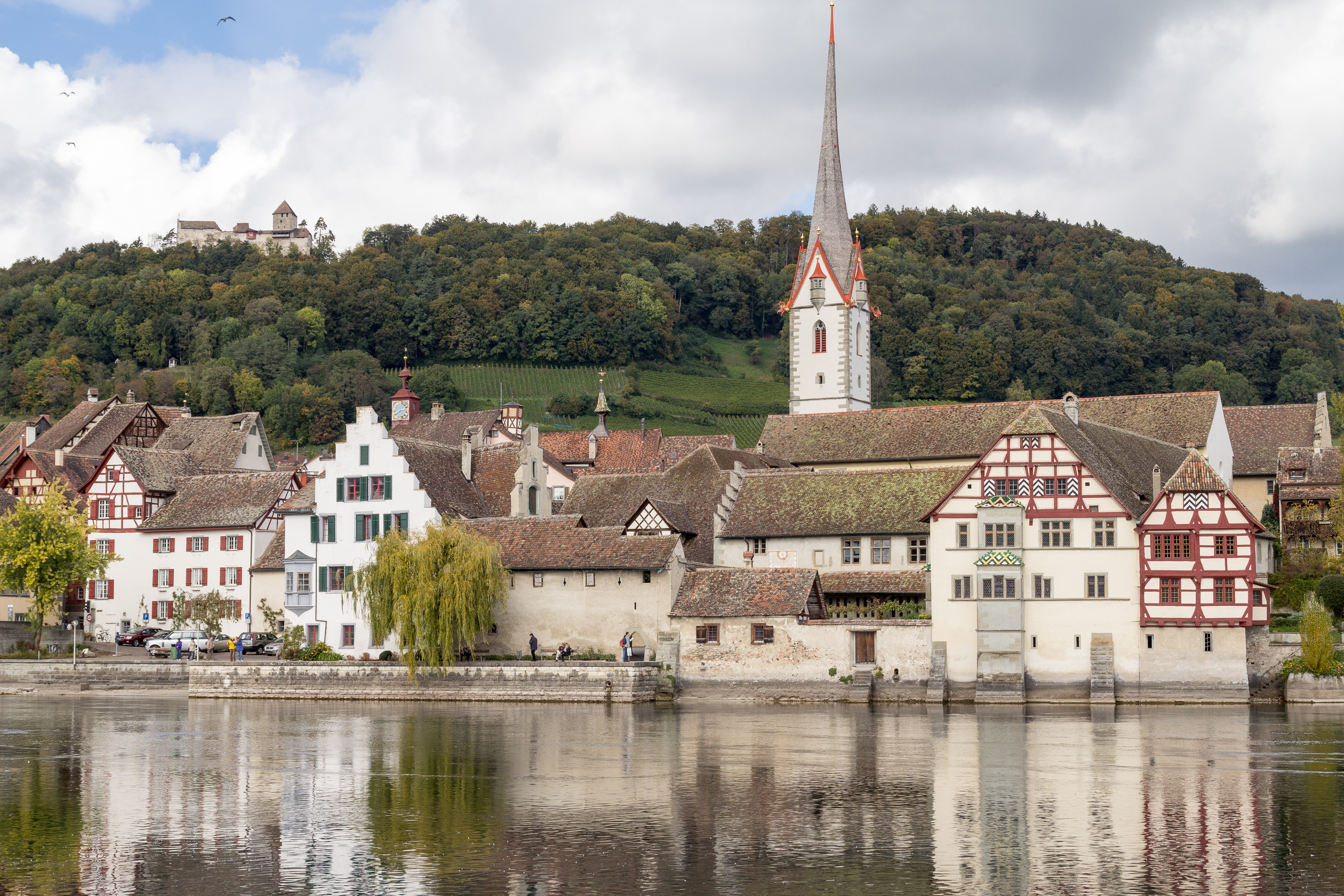
- Stein am Rhein with St. Georgen Monastery and Hohenklingen Castle

- Flag Coat of arms
- Location of Stein am Rhein
- Location within Switzerland Location within Canton of Schaffhausen
- Coordinates: 47°40′N 8°51′E
- Country: Switzerland
- Canton: Schaffhausen
- District: n.a.

Government
  - Executive: Stadtrat with 5 members
  - Mayor: Stadtpräsident (list); Sönke Bandixen Ind. (as of September 2017)
  - Parliament: Einwohnerrat with 15 members

Area
  - Total: 6.05 km^{2} (2.34 sq mi)
- Elevation (Ehem. Benedektinerkloster St. Georgen): 401 m (1,316 ft)

Population (December 2020)
  - Total: 3,561
  - Density: 589/km^{2} (1,520/sq mi)
- Time zone: UTC+01:00 (CET)
  - Summer (DST): UTC+02:00 (CEST)
- Postal code: 8260
- SFOS number: 2964
- ISO 3166 code: CH-SH
- Surrounded by: Eschenz (TG), Hemishofen, Öhningen (DE-BW), Wagenhausen (TG)
- Website: www.steinamrhein.ch

Stein am Rhein (Swiss Standard German pronunciation: [ˈʃtaɪn am ˈraɪn], lit. 'Stein on the Rhine'; abbreviated as Stein a. R.) is a historic town and a municipality in the canton of Schaffhausen in Switzerland. It is located at the outfall of Lower Lake Constance on the High Rhine river, about halfway between the town of Schaffhausen and the city of Konstanz.

The town's medieval centre retains the ancient street plan. The site of the city wall, and the city gates are preserved, though the former city wall now consists of houses. The medieval part of the town has been pedestrianised and many of the medieval buildings are painted with frescoes.

== History ==
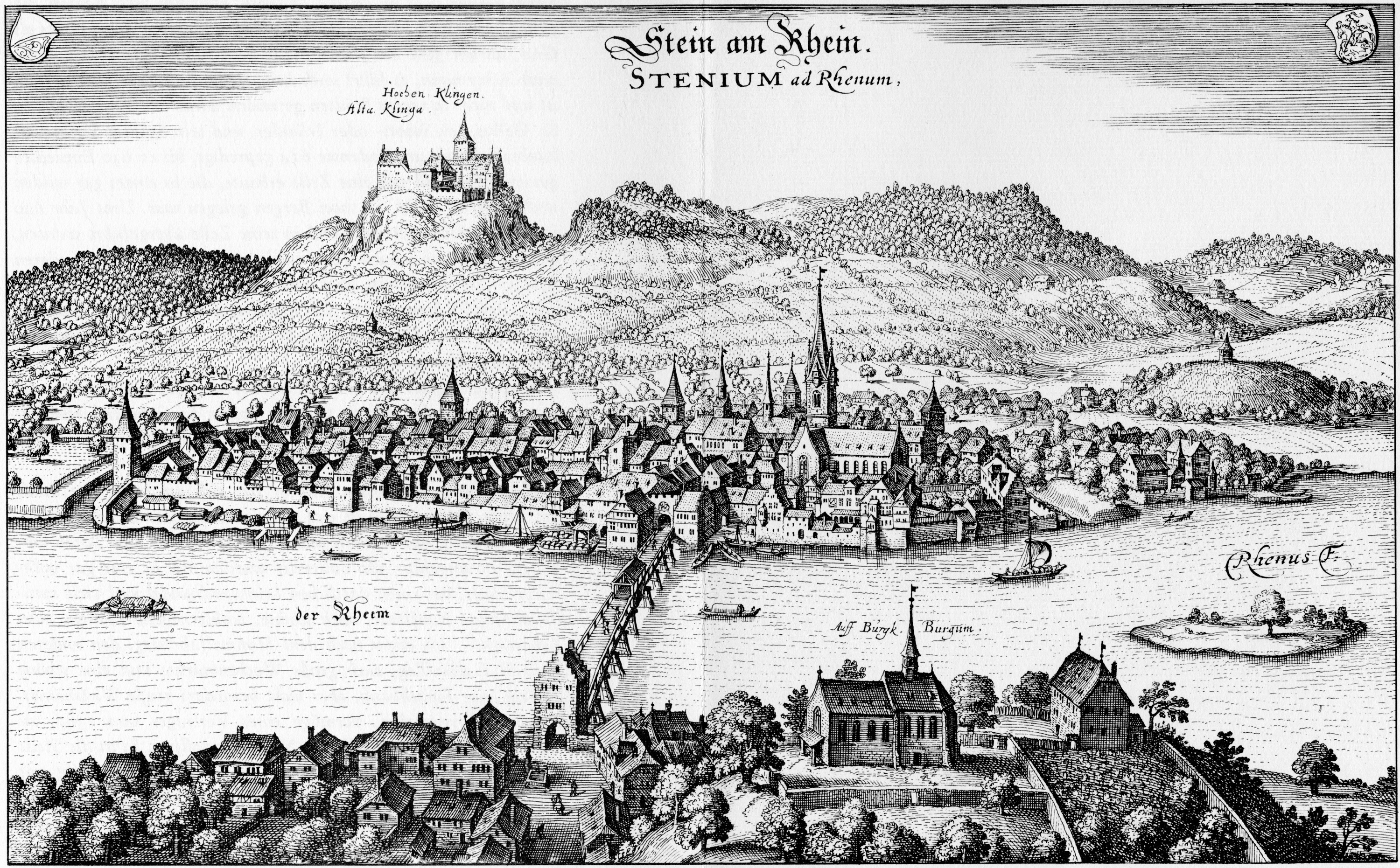
Stein am Rhein 1642

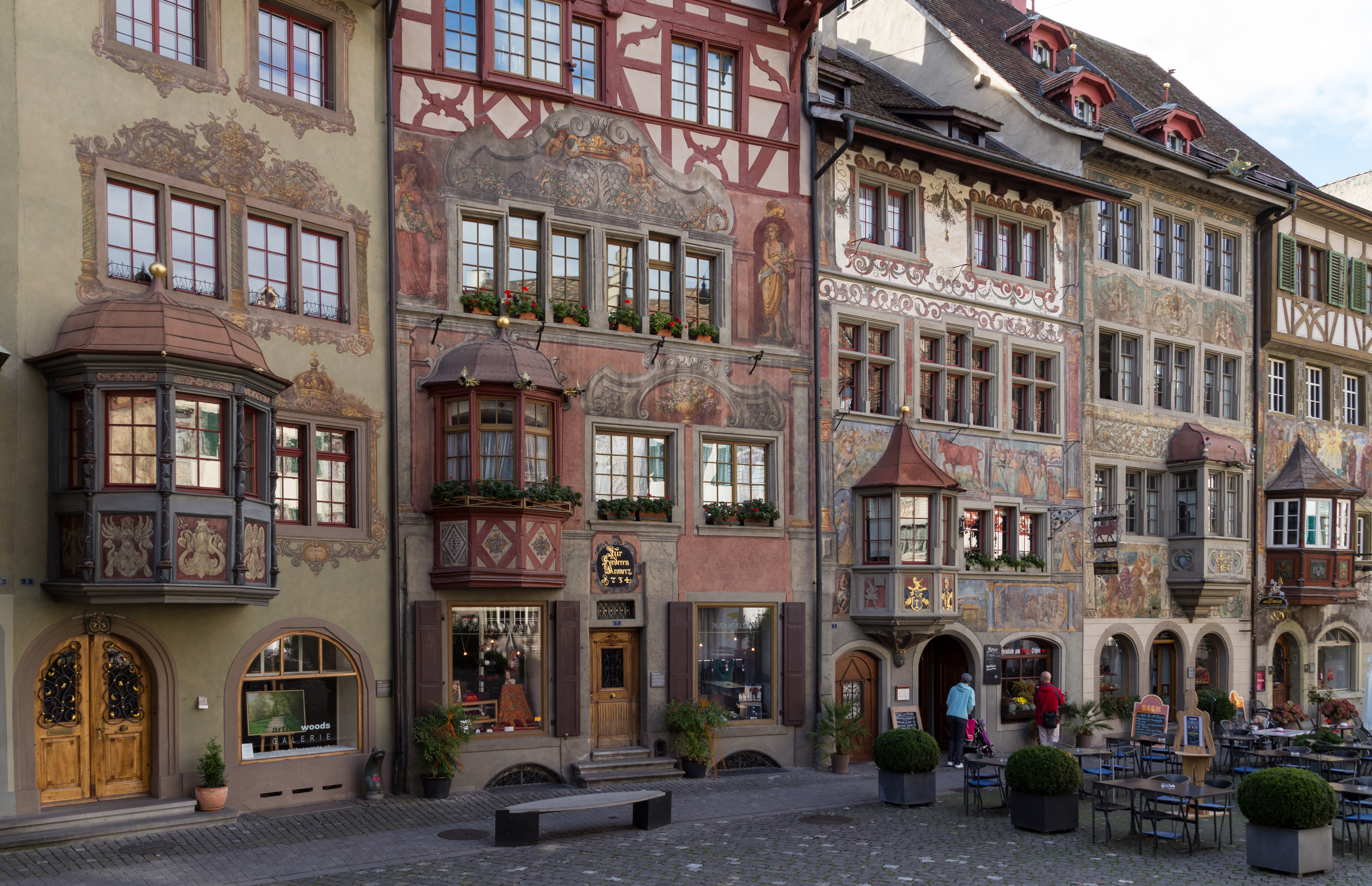
Painted houses with bay windows in the Old Town

Aerial view by Walter Mittelholzer (1919)

In or around 1007 Emperor Henry II moved St George's Abbey from its former location on the Hohentwiel in Singen to Stein am Rhein, at that time little more than a small fishing village on the Rhine. This was in order to strengthen his presence at this strategic point where major road and river routes intersected. He gave the abbots extensive rights over Stein and its trade so that they could develop it commercially. In this they were very successful, and Stein am Rhein rapidly became a prosperous town which in the 15th century was briefly granted reichsfrei status.

The Imperial abbey also prospered and in the 15th century completely rebuilt its premises, which remain as a significant example of late Gothic architecture in the region.

Under the Reformation, the abbey was secularised and its assets taken over by Zürich. Abbot von Winkelsheim negotiated a settlement with the Zürich authorities, whereby, although control of the abbey was handed over to them, he and the remaining monks would be allowed to remain on the premises until their deaths. However, Zürich suspected the abbot of collusion with the Habsburgs and locked him up in his new rooms. He was able to escape to Radolfzell, but died shortly after, in 1526.

On February 22, 1945, the town was bombed by the United States Air Force.

== Coat of arms ==
The blazon of the municipal coat of arms is Gules St. George armoured Azure mulleted, haired and haloed Or riding a Horse Argent to sinister holding in sinister an escutcheon Argent cross Gules and in dexter a lance Or killing a Dragon Vert. This is a reference to the monastery of St. George in the town. The coat of arms bears similarity to the coats of arms of Kaltbrunn (Switzerland), Sankt Georgen im Schwarzwald (Germany) and Sankt Georgen an der Gusen (Austria), Moscow (Russia), Holstebro (Denmark) and Georgia, among others.

== Geography ==
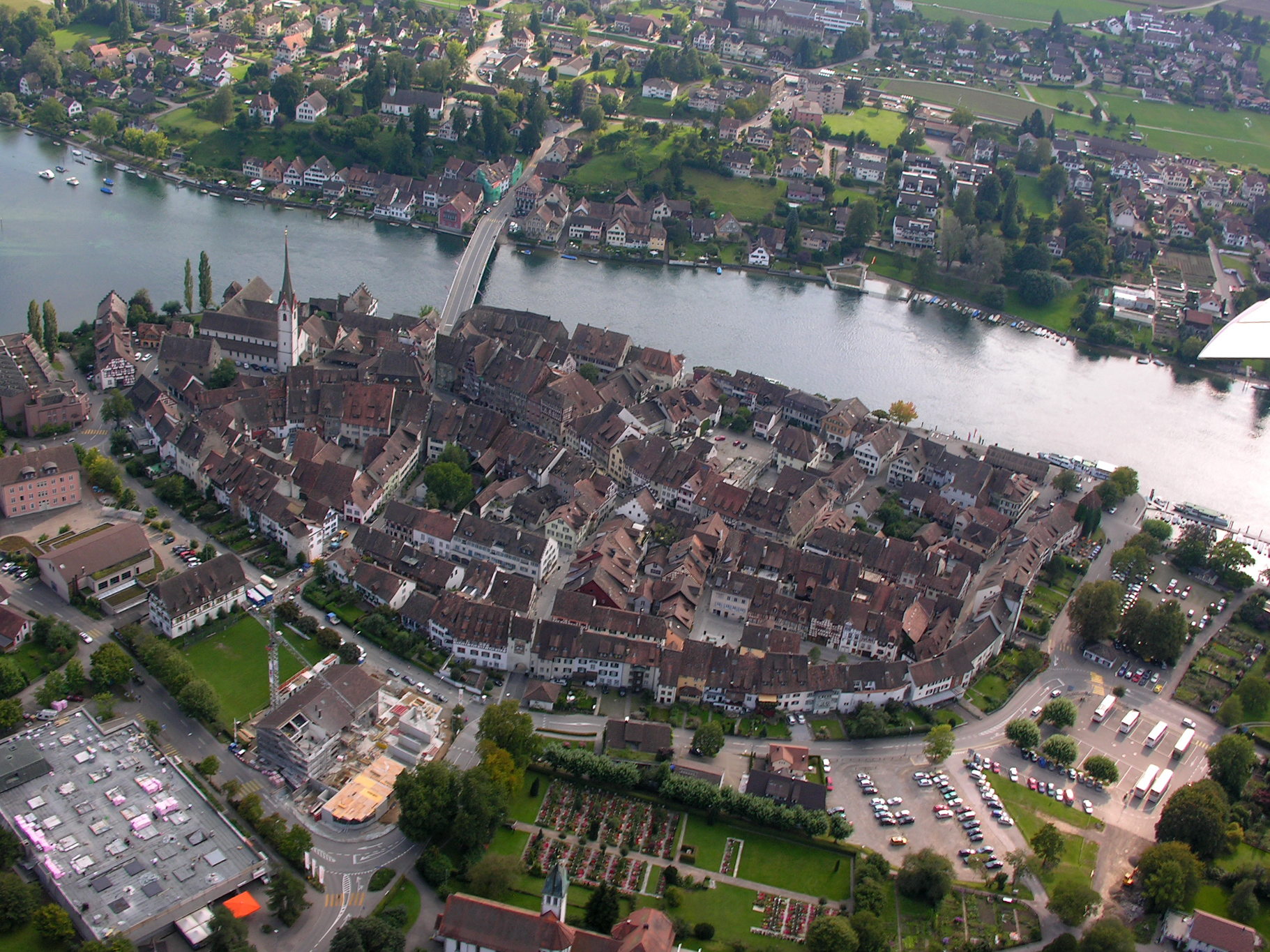
Aerial view of Stein am Rhein, showing the Rhine and the compact medieval town

Stein am Rhein is located in the eastern part of the Swiss canton of Schaffhausen, where the Rhine flows out of the Untersee (lit. 'lower lake'), the western part of Lake Constance (Bodensee). It is adjacent to the Hegau region of southern Germany, known for its extinct volcanoes and castles.

Stein am Rhein has an area, as of 2018, of 6.05 km^{2} (2.34 sq mi). Of this area, 29.9% is used for agricultural purposes, while 42.4% is forested. Of the rest of the land, 22% is settled (buildings or roads) and the remainder (5.7%) is non-productive (rivers or lakes).

== Demographics ==
Stein am Rhein has a population (as of 31 December 2020) of 3,561. In 2008 a total of 20.6% of the population were foreign nationals. Of the foreign population, (as of 2008), 38.6% are from Germany, 6.9% are from Italy, 3.2% are from Croatia, 12.8% are from Serbia, 10.8% are from North-Macedonia, 1.8% are from Turkey, and 25.8% are from other countries. Most of the population (as of 2000) speaks German (89.2%), with Serbo-Croatian being second most common (2.5%) and Albanian being third (1.4%).

As of 2008 children and teenagers (0–19 years old) make up 19.2% of the population, while adults (20–64 years old) make up 59.2% and seniors (over 64 years old) make up 21.5%.

In the 2007 federal election the most popular party was the Swiss People's Party, which received 42% of the vote. The next two most popular parties were the Social Democratic Party of Switzerland (33%) and the Free Democratic Party of Switzerland (24.9%).

About 75% of the population (between ages 25–64) have completed either non-mandatory upper secondary education or additional higher education (either university or a Fachhochschule). As of 2007, 1.65% of the population attend kindergarten or another pre-school, 5.66% attend a primary school, 3.08% attend a lower level secondary school, and 2.13% attend a higher level secondary school.

As of 2000, 25.1% of the population belonged to the Roman Catholic Church and 50.6% belonged to the Swiss Reformed Church.

The historical population is given in the following table:

Year	Population
1990	2,815
2000	2,995

== Economy ==
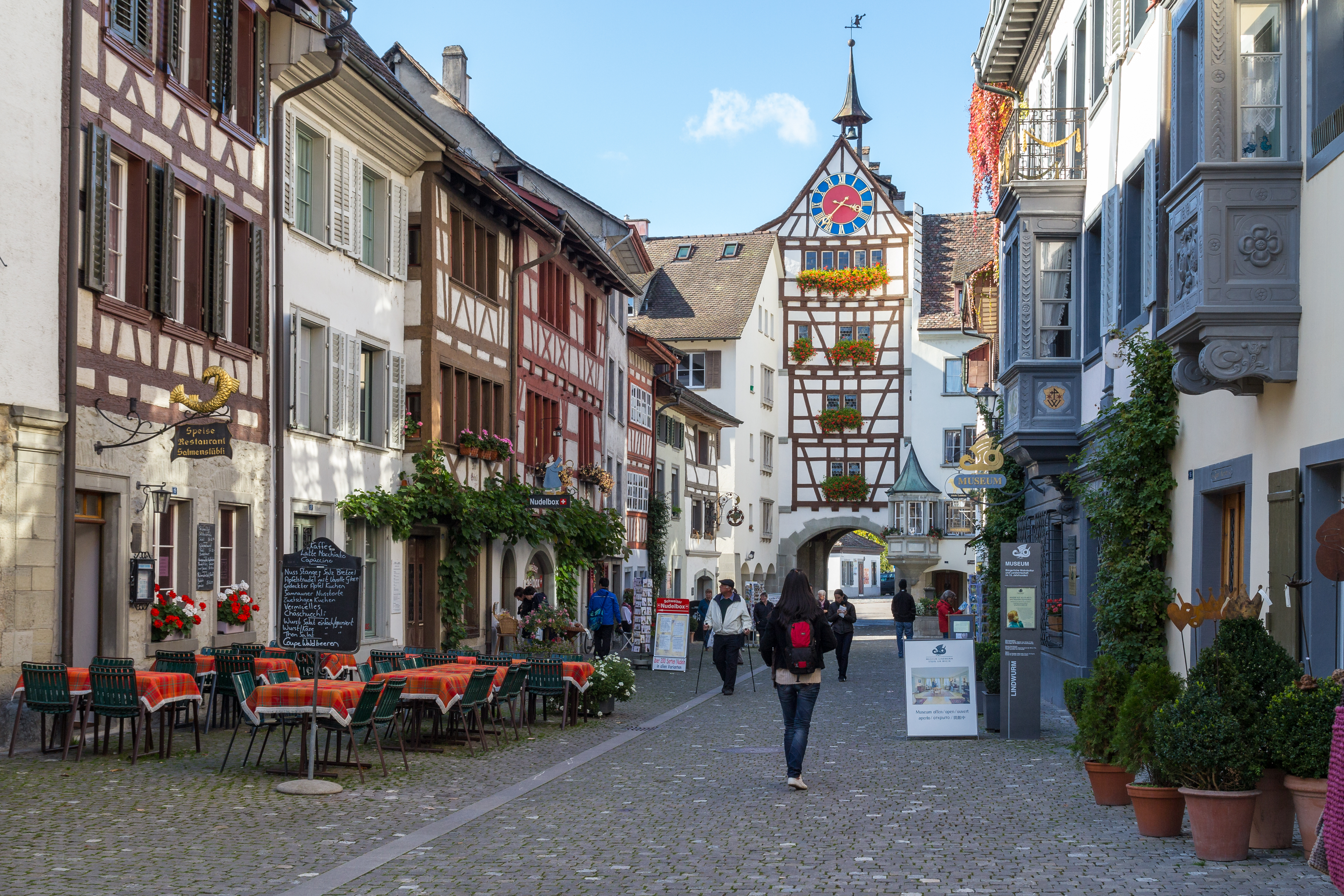
Street "Unterstadt" and Untertor (lower gate and clock tower)

Stein am Rhein has an unemployment rate (as of 2007) of 1.74%. As of 2005, there were 61 people employed in the primary economic sector and about 14 businesses involved in this sector. 553 people are employed in the secondary sector and there are 45 businesses in this sector. 856 people are employed in the tertiary sector, with 172 businesses in this sector.

As of 2008 the mid year average unemployment rate was 2.1%. There were 217 non-agrarian businesses in the municipality and 38.6% of the (non-agrarian) population was involved in the secondary sector of the economy while 61.4% were involved in the third. At the same time, 71.1% of the working population was employed full-time, and 28.9% was employed part-time. There were 1552 residents of the municipality who were employed in some capacity, of which females made up 44.1% of the workforce. As of 2000 there were 644 residents who worked in the municipality, while 714 residents worked outside Stein am Rhein and 625 people commuted into the municipality for work.

As of 2008, there are 16 restaurants, and 10 hotels with 435 beds. The hospitality industry in Stein am Rhein employs 105 people.

== Transport ==
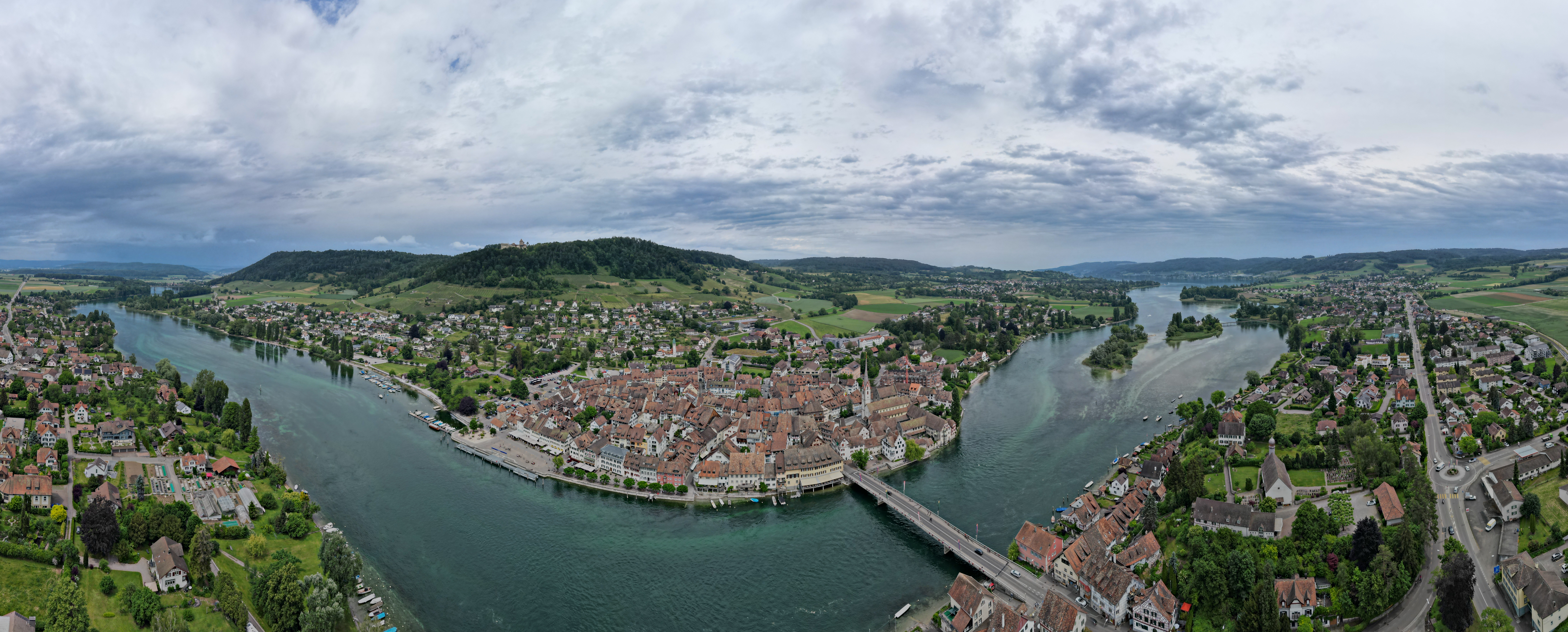
Stein am Rhein aerial panorama

Stein am Rhein railway station is situated on the opposite (southern) bank of the Rhine to the historic centre of the town, a walk of some 500 m (1,600 ft) (there are also buses). The station is served by regional trains only, both of which run every 30 minutes:

- S1 service of St. Gallen S-Bahn to Schaffhausen and Wil SG (via St. Gallen and Romanshorn)
- S29 service of Zurich S-Bahn to Winterthur, connections to long-distance trains to Zürich HB and other destinations.

There are buses departing from the railway station to either Frauenfeld or to Singen and Radolfzell in Germany (via the old town of Stein am Rhein).

The URh navigation company offers regular boat services between Schaffhausen and Kreuzlingen, via Konstanz.

== Culture ==
Stein am Rhein received the first Wakker Prize for the preservation of its architectural heritage in 1972. The award noted that Stein am Rhein was nearly unique in Switzerland and rare in all of Europe for the number of notable buildings in a compact space. It also noted the excellent care with which the city was preserved.

== Notable people ==
- Mathias Gnädinger (1941–2015), a Swiss stage and film actor, lived in Stein am Rhein

== Heritage sites of national significance ==
Stein am Rhein is home to several buildings that are listed as Swiss heritage sites of national significance. There are three churches on the list; the former monastery church of St. Georg, the former Benedictine monastery church of St. Georgen and the Castle Church (Kirche auf Burg). Burg Hohenklingen above the town, an older late-Roman castle and the city walls are also included on the list. In the old city there are six houses or municipal building that are on the inventory. The former Inn Rother Ochsen at Rathausplatz 9, Haus Neubu at Bärengass 7, Haus zum Lindwurm at Understadt 18, Haus zum Weissen Adler at Oberstadt 1, Haus zur Vorderen Krone at Rathausplatz 7 and the Town Hall at Rathausplatz 1 make up the rest of the inventory.

== Gallery ==
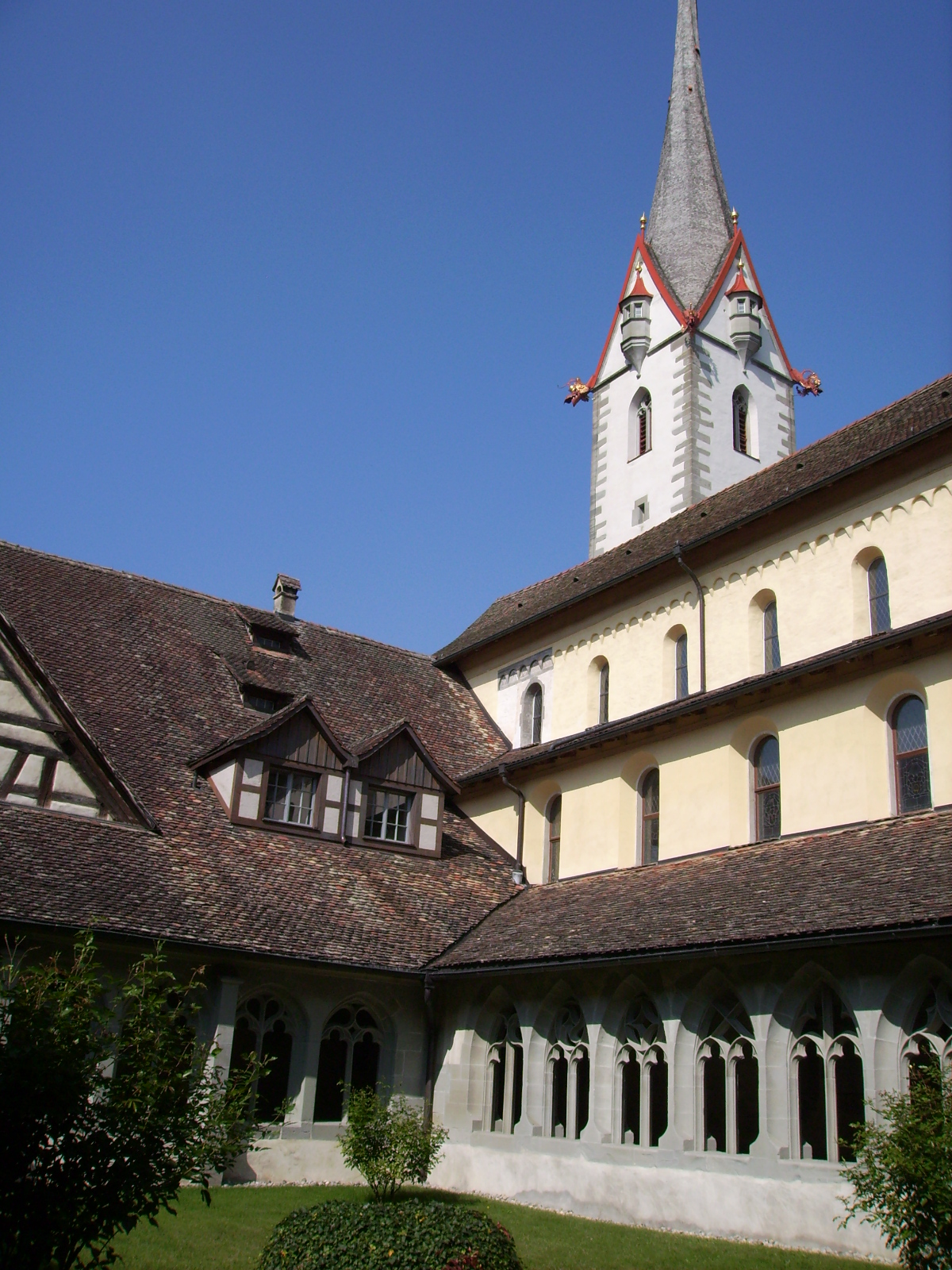
Monastery of St. Georg

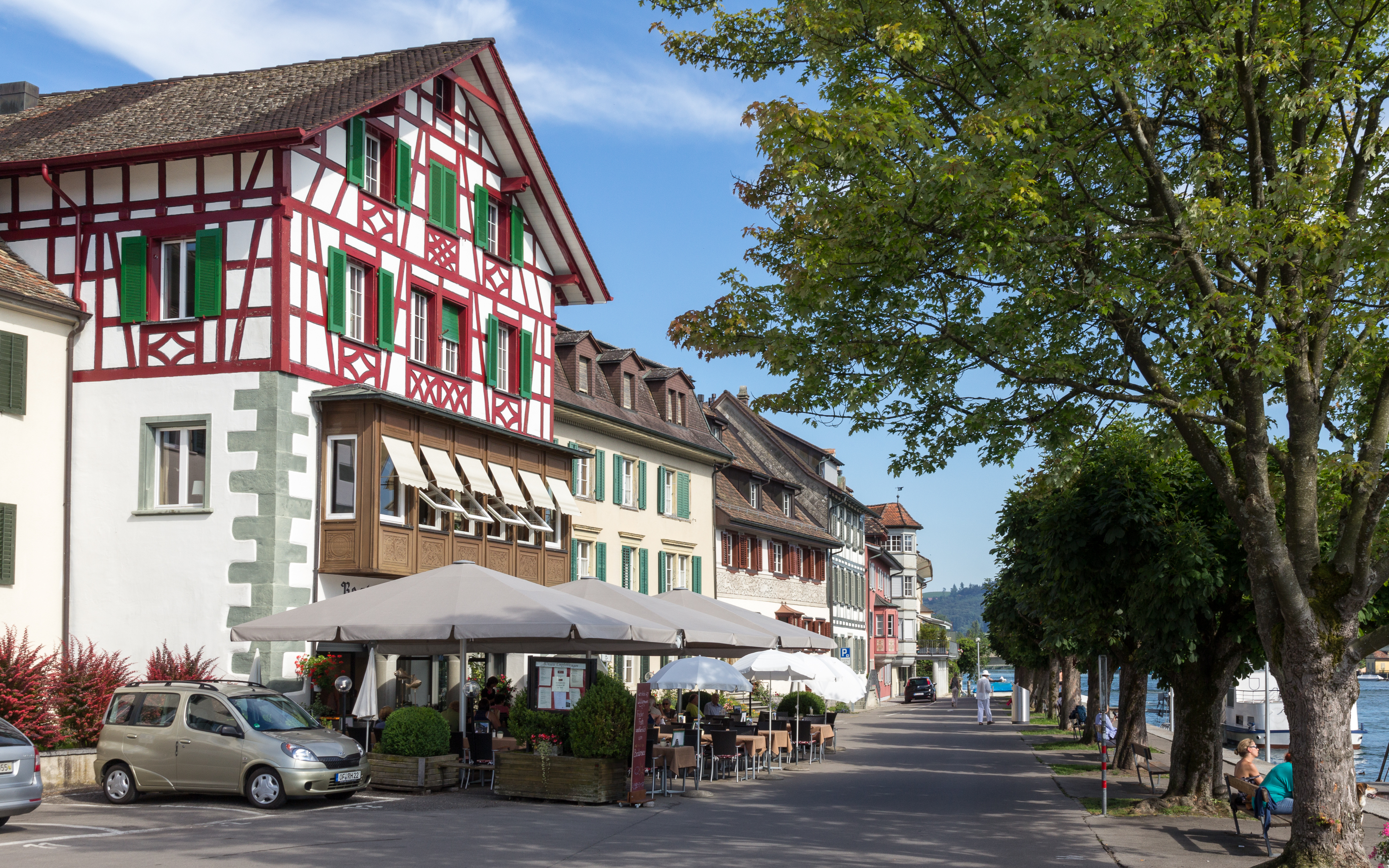
Promenade at River Rhine

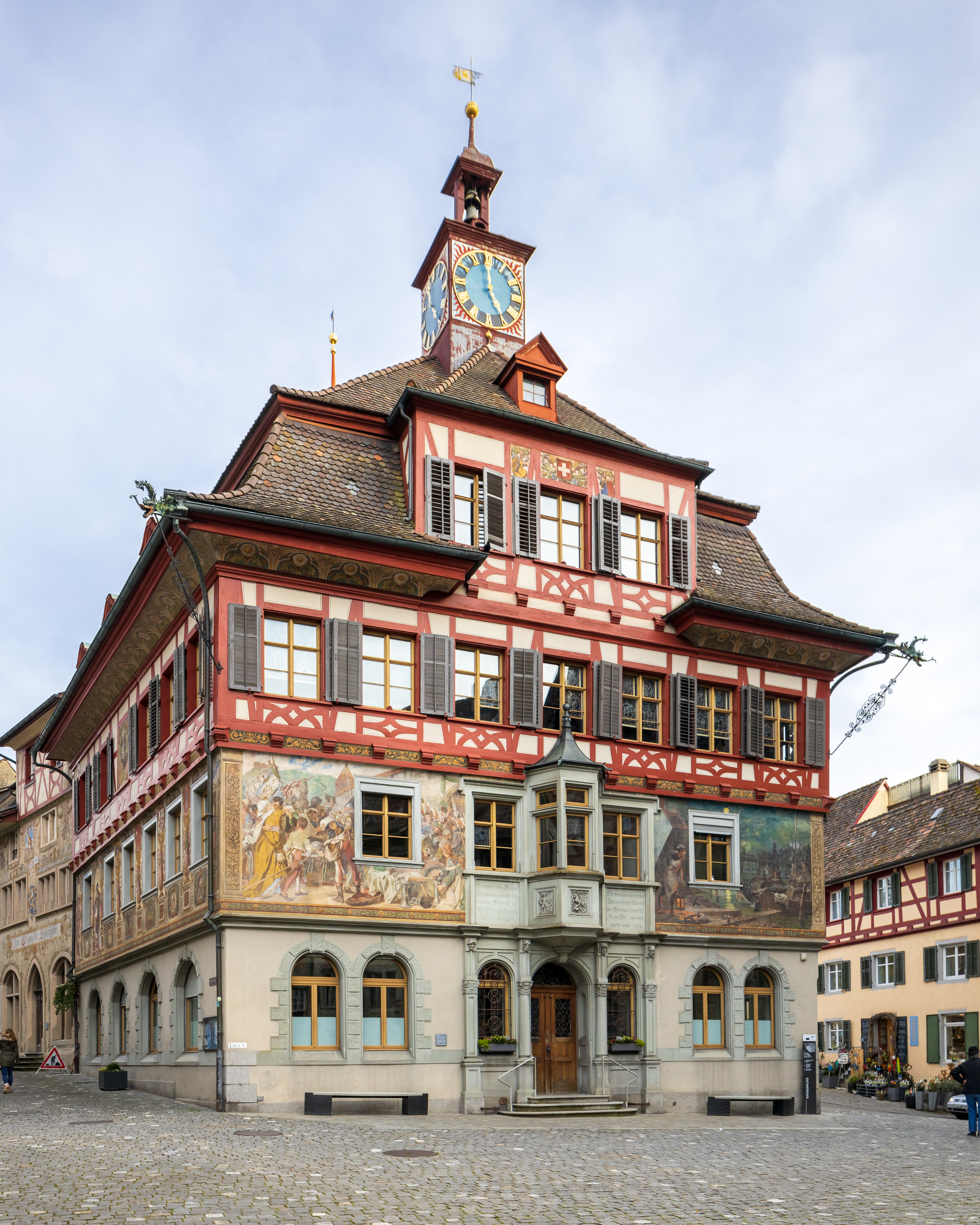
Town hall

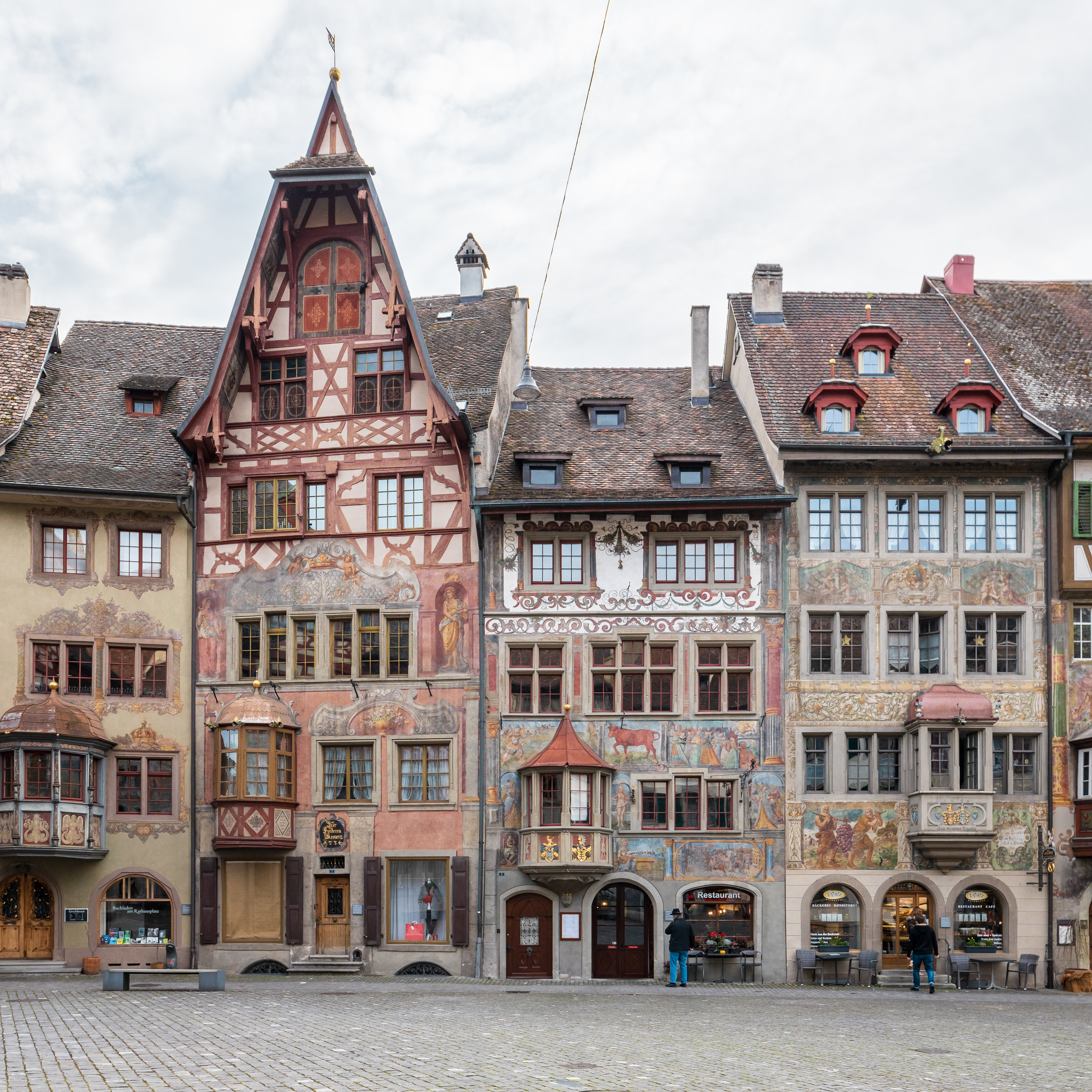
Houses at town hall square

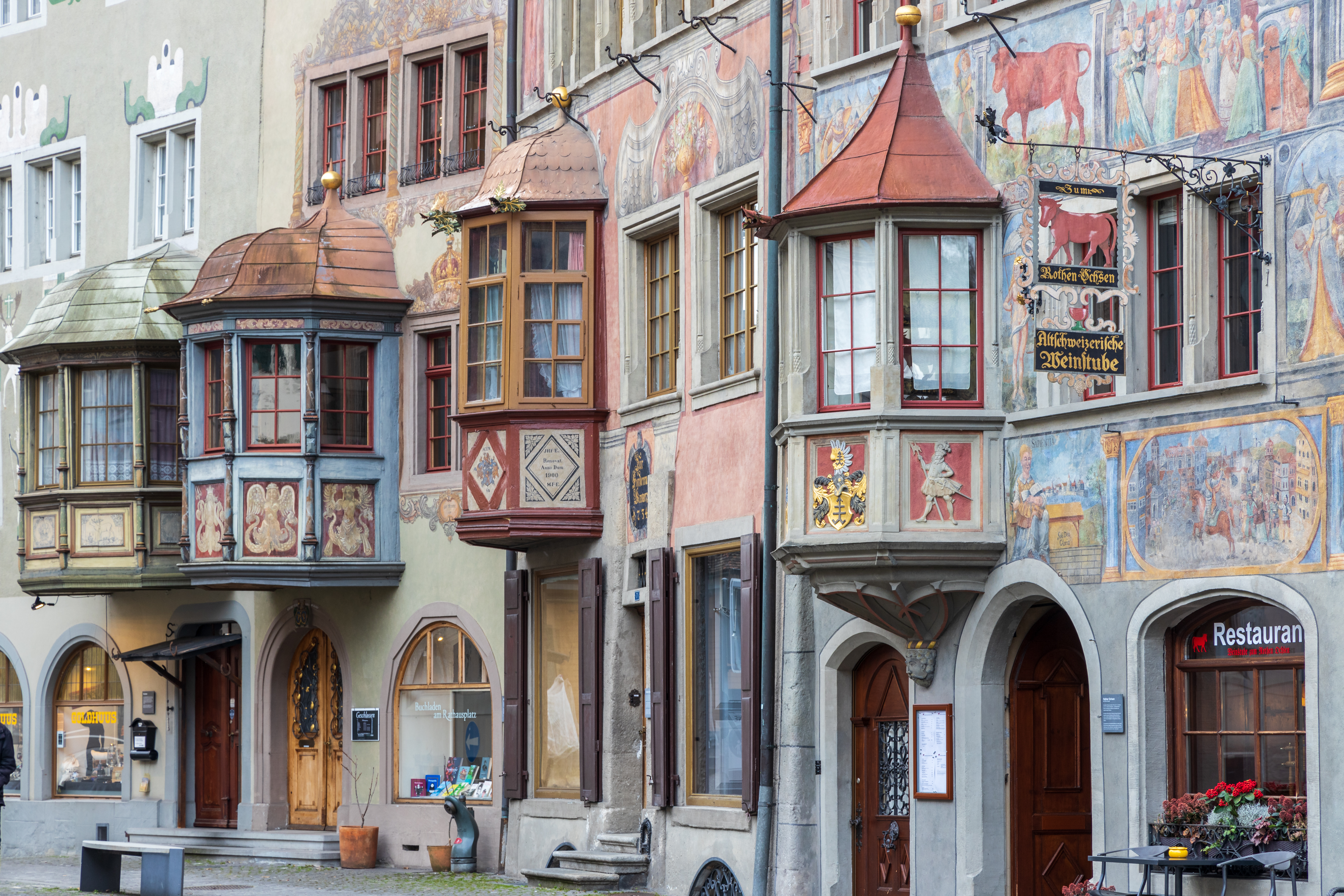
Orial windows and murals at town hall square

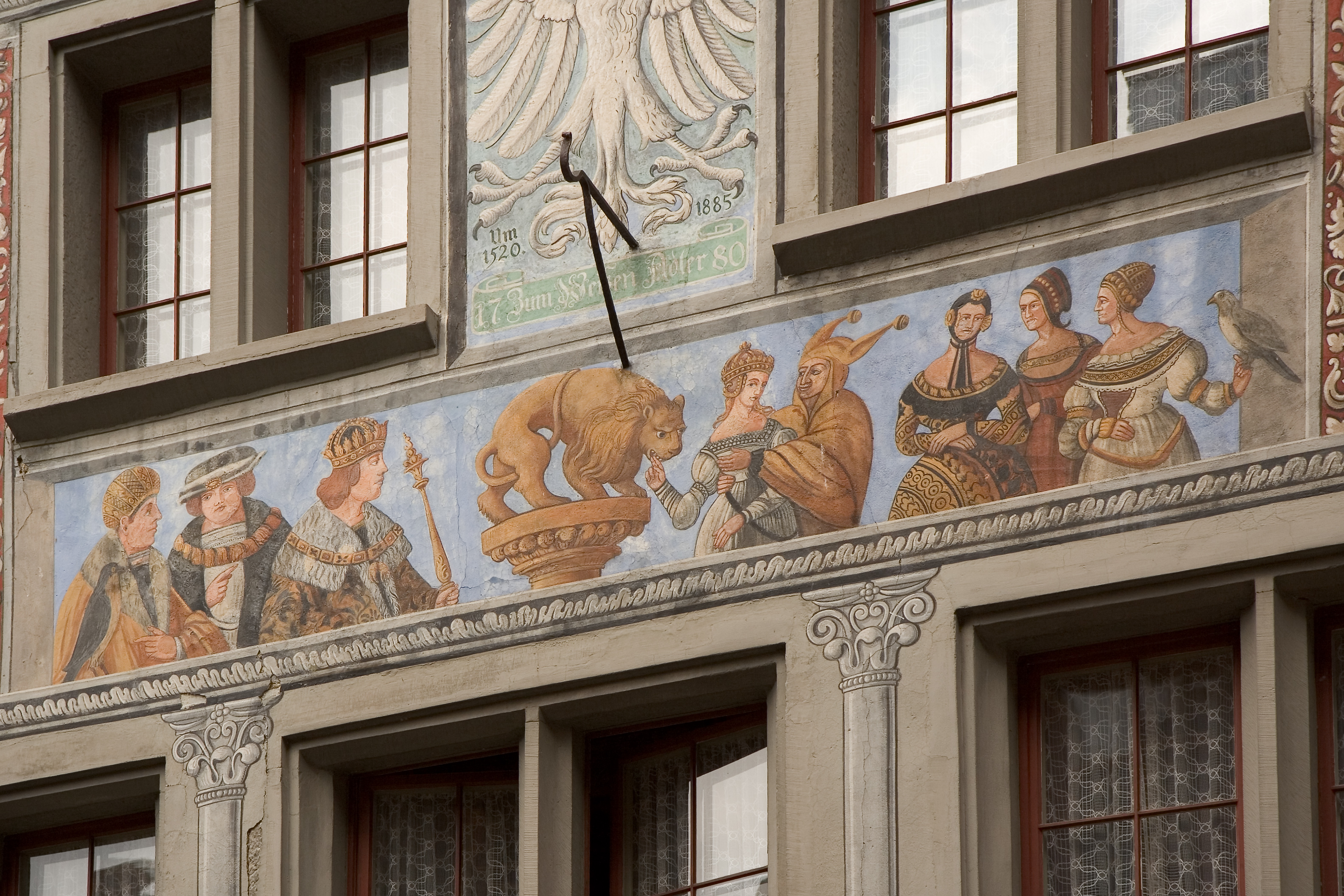
Haus zum Weissen Adler

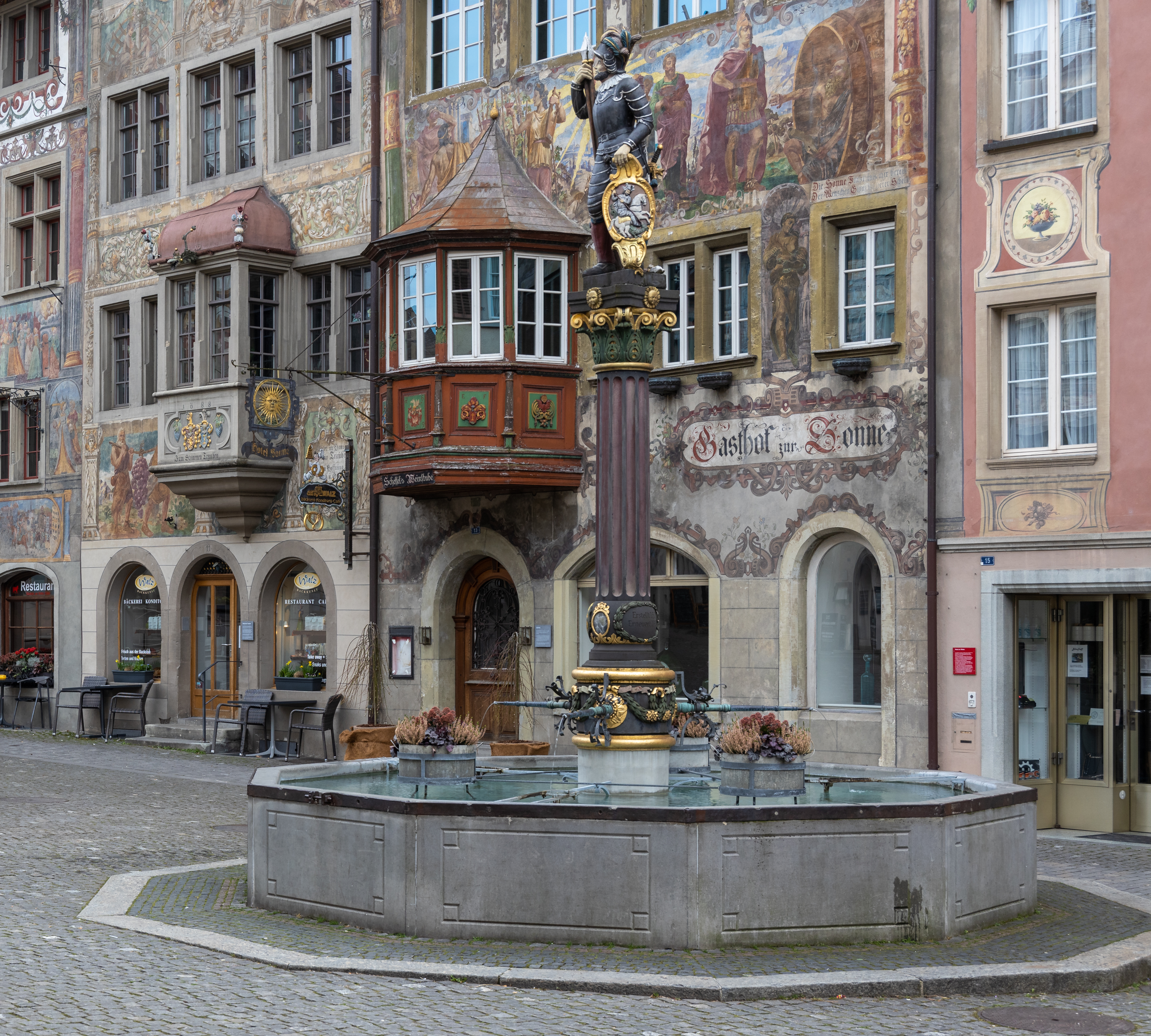
Marktbrunnen (Market fontaine)

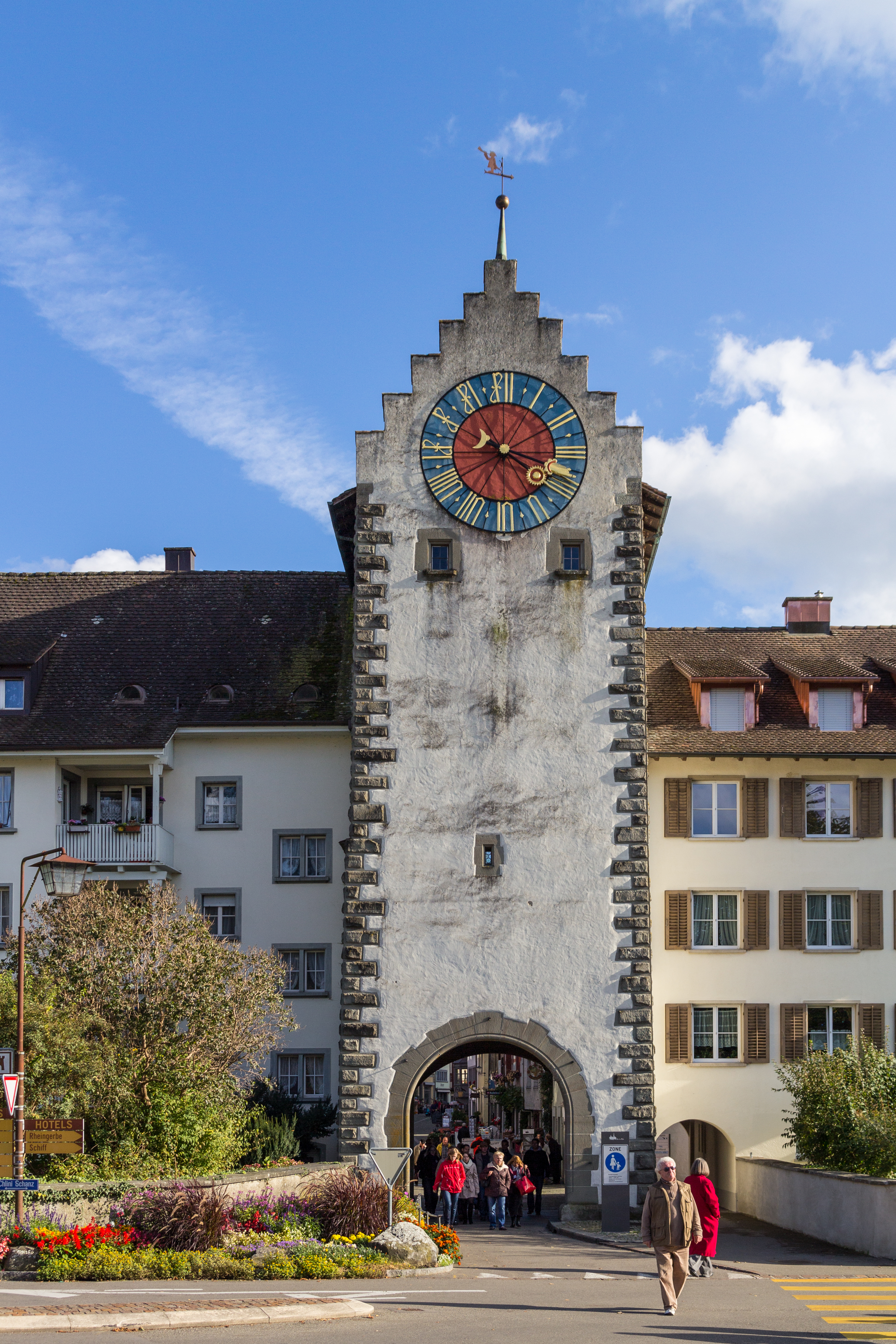
Untertor (lower gate and clock tower)
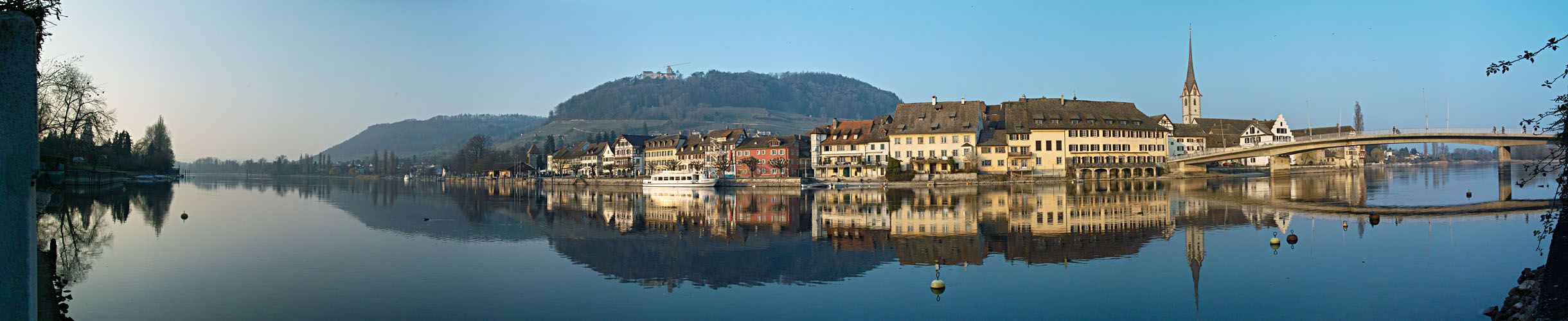
Panorama of Stein am Rhein and the High Rhine, with Hohenklingen Castle in the background
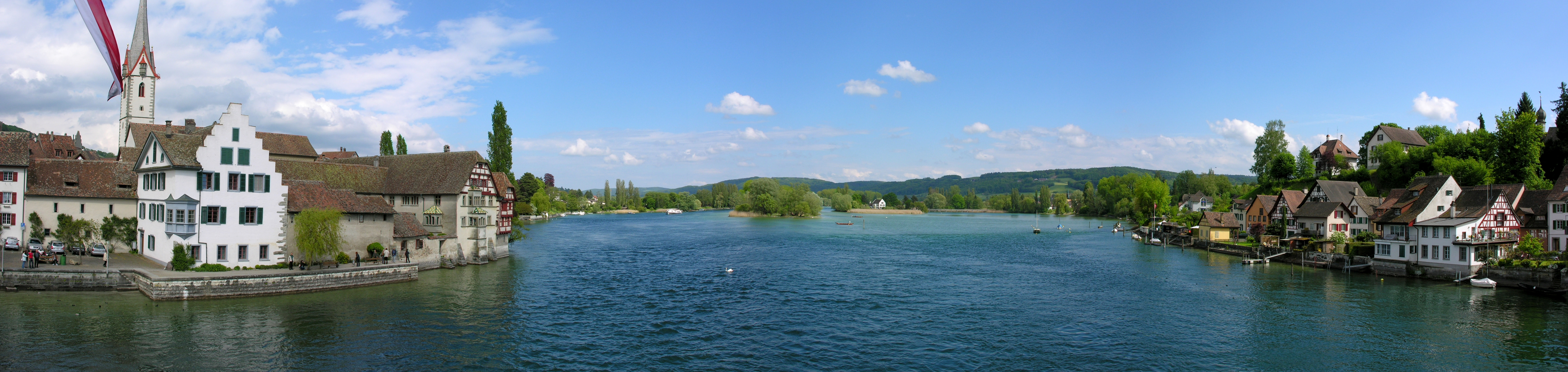
Panorama of Stein am Rhein in late afternoon sunlight, with High Rhine and Werd islands

== See also ==
- Tourism in Switzerland
