= List of regents =

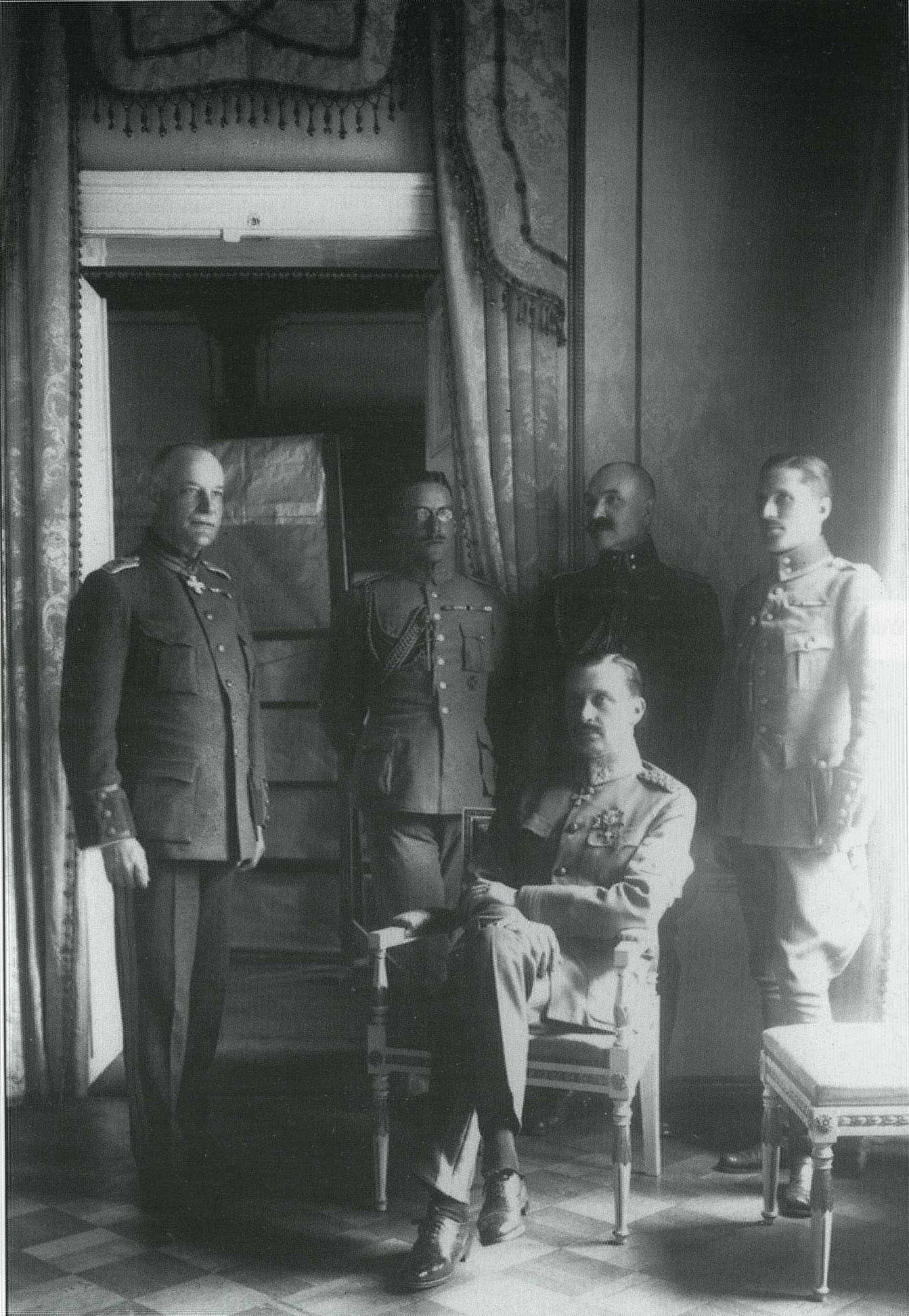
Gustaf Mannerheim as regent of Finland (sitting) and his adjutants (from the left) Lt. Col. Lilius, Cap. Kekoni, Lt. Gallen-Kallela, Ensign Rosenbröijer.

A regent is a person selected to act as head of state (ruling or not) because the ruler is a minor, not present, or debilitated. The following is a list of regents throughout history.

== Regents in extant monarchies ==
Those who held a regency briefly, for example during surgery, are not necessarily listed, particularly if they performed no official acts; this list is also not complete, presumably not even for all monarchies included. The list includes some figures who acted as regent, even if they did not themselves hold the title of regent.

=== Asia ===
==== Cambodia ====
- Prince Sisowath Monireth, Chairman of the Regency Council of Cambodia in 1960
- Chea Sim, Acting Head of State of Cambodia from 1993 to 1994, and again from 1994 to 1995, and twice in 2004
- Nhek Bun Chhay, Acting Head of State of Cambodia in 2004

==== Japan ====
- Regent Empress Dowager Jingū for her son, the future Emperor Ōjin
- Prince Regent Shōtoku for his aunt, Empress Suiko
- Fujiwara Regents as Sesshō or Kampaku
- Prince Regent Hirohito for his father, Emperor Taishō, from 1921 to 1926.

==== Jordan ====
- Prince Naif bin Al-Abdullah from 20 July to 5 September 1951, due to the schizophrenia of his brother King Talal, who was in a Swiss mental hospital.
- A regency council (Ibrahim Hashem, Suleiman Toukan, Abdul Rahman Rusheidat and chairing Queen Mother Zein al-Sharaf Talal) took over during the king's ailment and continued after the king's forced abdication (on 11 August 1952), serving from 4 June 1952 to 2 May 1953, until King Hussein came of age.
- Crown Prince Hassan, from 4 July 1998 to 19 January 1999 while his brother King Hussein was undergoing cancer treatments.

==== Malaysia and its constitutive monarchies ====
===== Terengganu =====
- Tengku Muhammad Ismail (eight years of age at the time), co-reigned with the three-member Regency Advisory Council (Majlis Penasihat Pemangku Raja) from 2006 to 2011. His father, Sultan Mizan Zainal Abidin the Sultan of Terengganu was elected as 13th King of Malaysia. The Malaysian constitution does not allow a simultaneous reign as both the King of Malaysia and as monarch of the King's native state (deemed absent on the State throne). Sultan Mizan was crowned as King on 13 December 2006 and the prince as the Regent (Pemangku Raja) of Terengganu effective on the same date.

==== Oman ====
- for the minor Sa`id (II) ibn Sultan (b. 1790 – succeeded 20 November 1804 – d. 19 Oct 1856) : 20 November 1804 – 31 July 1806 Badr ibn Sayf (d. 1806)
- for Sultan Turki ibn Sa`id (b. 1832 – succeeded 30 January 1871 – died 4 Jun 1888) : August – December 1875 Abdul-Aziz ibn Said – (b. 1850 – d. 1907)

==== Qatar ====
- H.E. Shaikh Abdullah bin Jassim Al Thani was proclaimed as regent when his father Sheikh Qasim bin Muhammad Al Thani became incapacitated, 13 May 1913; succeeded on his death, 17 July 1913

==== Saudi Arabia ====
- 30 March 1964 – 2 November 1964 Crown Prince Faisal (b. 1906 – d. 1975) –Regent for his brother King Saud, and later his successor
- 1 January 1996 – 21 February 1996 formally, but de facto until 1 August 2005 Crown Prince Abdullah (b. 1924 – d. 2015) –Regent for his brother King Fahd, and later his successor

==== Thailand ====
- Prayurawongse for King Mongkut (1851–1855)
- Sri Suriwongse for King Chulalongkorn (1868–1873)
- Queen Saovabha Phongsri for King Chulalongkorn (1897)
- Crown Prince Maha Vajiravudh for King Chulalongkorn (1907)
- Prince Prajadhipok Sakdidej for King Vajiravudh (1925)
- Prince Paribatra Sukhumbandhu for King Prajadhipok (1932)
- Prince Narisara Nuwattiwong for King Prajadhipok (1934–1935)
- Prince Oscar Anuvatana (d. 1935), Prince Aditya Dibabha (1935–1944), Pan Sukhum (1935–1938), General Um Indrayodhin (1935–1942) and Pridi Banomyong (1941–1945) for King Ananda Mahidol
- Prem Tinsulanonda, regent from 13 October to 1 December 2016 while King Vajiralongkorn was in Germany mourning for his father and predecessor

=== Africa ===
==== Morocco ====
- The Wattasid Vizier Abu Zakariya Yahya was regent during the minority of the Marinid sultan Abd al-Haqq II; the Wattasid Viziers however kept the power beyond the majority of Abd al-Haqq II, until 1459 when most members of their family were killed by the sultan, allowing him to return to power.

==== Lesotho ====
- Queen Mamohato was regent for the exiled King Moshoeshoe II in 1970 and again in 1990, and after his death in 1996.

==== Eswatini ====
- Tibati Nkambule of Swaziland was regent following the death of Mbandzeni, until the majority of his son Ngwane V (1889 to 1895)
- Labotsibeni Mdluli was regent following the death of her son Ngwane V, until the majority of his son King Sobhuza II (1899 to 1921)
- Queen Dzeliwe was regent after the death of her husband King Sobhuza II from 1982 to 1983
- Queen Ntfombi was regent following the death of her husband King Sobhuza II, until the majority of his son King Mswati III (1983 to 1986)

=== Europe ===
==== Belgium ====
- Baron Erasme Louis Surlet de Chokier, regent of Belgium until Leopold I's formal accession in 1831
- Prince Charles, Count of Flanders, prince regent of Belgium during his elder brother Leopold III's exile and suspension of royal duties from 1944 to 1950
- Prince Baudouin, Duke of Brabant, prince regent of Belgium from 1950 to 1951, for his father Leopold III

==== Denmark ====
- Margaret Sambiria, Regent for her son Eric V, 1259–1264.
- Agnes of Brandenburg, Regent for her son Eric VI, 1286–1293.
- Gerhard III of Holstein, Regent for Valdemar III, 1326–1330.
- Margrete Valdemarsdatter, Regent for her son Olaf II, 1376–1387.
- Philippa of England, Regent on behalf of her husband Eric of Pomerania, 1423–1425.
- Christopher of Bavaria, regent of the realm prior to his official election as king, 1439–1440.
- Dorothea of Brandenburg During the Danish intermarium, 1448.
- Isabella of Austria, Regent on behalf of her husband Christian II of Denmark while he was in Sweden, 1520.
- Louise of Mecklenburg-Güstrow, Regent during her husband's, Frederick IV trip to Italy, 1708–1709.
- Johann Friedrich Struensee, de facto regent for King Christian VII, 1770–1772.
- Hereditary Prince Frederick (along with, effectively, his mother, Queen Juliana Maria) for his half-brother (and her step-son), King Christian VII, 1772–1784.
- Crown Prince Frederick for his father, King Christian VII, 1784–1808.
- Marie of Hesse-Kassel, Regent for her spouse Frederick VI during his visit to Vienna, 1814–1815.
- Crown Prince Frederik for his father, King Christian X, 1942–1943.
- Crown Prince Frederik for his mother, Queen Margrethe II from 21–25 February 2023.
- Christian, Crown Prince of Denmark for his father Frederik X, during the latter's trip to Poland from 31 January to 2 February 2024.

==== Liechtenstein ====
- Prince Franz Joseph was regent for four months for his grand-uncle Sovereign Prince Franz I.
- Hereditary Prince Hans-Adam was regent for his father Sovereign Prince Franz Joseph II from 1984 until the latter's death in 1989.
- Hereditary Prince Alois has been regent for his father Sovereign Prince Hans-Adam II since 15 August 2004.

==== Luxembourg ====
- Duke Adolph of Nassau was regent from 8 April 1889 to 3 May 1889 and from 4 November 1890 to 23 November 1890, during the terminal illness of Grand Duke William III.
- Dowager Grand Duchess Marie Anne was regent to her husband, Grand Duke William IV, during his terminal illness from 19 November 1908 to 25 February 1912, and then regent to her daughter, Grand Duchess Marie-Adélaïde, during her minority from 25 February 1912 to 18 June 1912.
- Hereditary Grand Duke Jean was regent for his mother, Grand Duchess Charlotte, from 4 May 1961 to 12 November 1964.
- Hereditary Grand Duke Henri was regent for his father, Grand Duke Jean, from 4 March 1998 to 7 October 2000.
- Hereditary Grand Duke Guillaume was regent for his father, Grand Duke Henri, from 8 October 2024 to 3 October 2025.

==== Monaco ====
- Hereditary Prince Albert was regent for his father Prince Rainier III from 31 March 2005 to 6 April 2005, when he succeeded him as Prince Albert II

==== Netherlands ====
- Dowager Princess Anne, during the minority of her son, William V, Prince of Orange, between 1751 and 1759
- Dowager Princess Marie Louise, during the minority of her son, William IV, Prince of Orange from 1711 to 1730, and the minority of her grandson, William V, jointly with Duke Louis Ernest of Brunswick-Lüneburg from 1759 till her death in 1765.
- Duke Louis Ernest of Brunswick-Lüneburg, the Captain-General of the Dutch army, during the minority of William V, jointly with Dowager Princess Marie Louise from 1759 until her death in 1765, and with Princess Carolina of Orange-Nassau (1765–1766)
- Princess Carolina, during the minority of her brother, William V, and jointly with Duke Louis Ernest, between 1765 and 1766.
- Council of State, during insanity of the King William III in 1889 and again in 1890
- Dowager Queen Emma (1890–1898), during the minority of her daughter Queen Wilhelmina, between 1890 and 1898
- Princess Juliana during illness of her mother Queen Wilhelmina in 1947 and again in 1948

==== Norway ====
- King Magnus Eriksson (1343–1355) after stepping down from the throne in favor of his son Haakon Magnusson
- Johann Friedrich Struensee, de facto regent for King Christian VII, 1770–1772
- Hereditary Prince Frederick (along with, effectively, his mother, Queen Juliana Maria) for his half-brother (and her step-son), King Christian VII, 1772–1784
- Crown Prince Frederick for his father, King Christian VII, 1784–1808
- Crown Prince Olav was regent for his father King Haakon VII in 1945, awaiting his return at end of the Second World War, and during his illness between 1955 and 1957.
- Crown Prince Harald was regent during the illness of his father King Olav V between 1990 and 1991.
- Crown Prince Haakon was regent from 25 November 2003 to 12 April 2004, from 29 March to 7 June 2005, from 3 March to 22 April 2024 and from 18 August 2026 to 28 August 2026 during the illness of his father King Harald V, up until his death when Haakon ascended to the throne.

==== Spain ====
- Crown of Castile: Ferdinand II of Aragon, twice regent of Castile (1504–1506, 1507–1516) for Queen Juana
- Pope Adrian VI (1520–1522) and Isabella of Portugal (1529–1533, 1535–1536, 1538–1539) and Prince Philip (1539–1541, 1543–1548, 1551–1554) and Archduke Maximilian (1548–1551) and Maria of Austria (1548–1551) during Charles I's absences.
- Joan of Austria, Princess Dowager of Portugal (Infanta Juana), regent of Castile (1554–1559) for King Philip II of Spain during the king's marriage to Queen Mary I of England.
- Fernando de Acevedo as President of the Council of Castile during King Philip III's visit to Portugal in 1619.
- Queen Mariana of Austria, regent of Spain during the minority of her son Charles II from 1665 to 1675.
- Luis Manuel Fernández de Portocarrero cardinal and archbishop of Toledo during King Charles II's illness in 1700.
- Government Board of the Realms during the illness of Charles II and Philip V absence from 1700 to 1701.
- Luis Manuel Fernández de Portocarrero cardinal and archbishop of Toledo during King Philip V's absence from 1701 to 1703.
- Queen Regent Elisabeth Farnese during King Charles III's absence in 1759.
- Infante Antonio Pascual of Spain, French invasion (King Ferdinand VII's absence) in 1808.
- Lieutenant General Joachim Murat (1808) and Jean de Dieu Soult (1813) during King Joseph's absence.
- A Supreme Central and Governmental Junta of Spain and the Indies from 25 September 1808 to 31 January 1810 and a regency Council (the Cortes of Cádiz from 1 February 1810 to 10 May 1814 during the imprisonment/abdication of Ferdinand VII.
- Regencies during the Hundred Thousand Sons of St. Louis Intervention (1823): Provisional Regency Council of the Realm. President: Cayetano Valdés y Flores, Provisional Government Board of Spain and the Indies. President: Francisco de Eguía, Regency Council of the Realm during King's Captivity. President: Pedro de Alcántara Álvarez de Toledo, 13th Duke of the Infantado.
- Queen Maria Christina during the minority of her daughter Isabella II from 1833 to 1840.
- Baldomero Espartero, Prince of Vergara during the minority of Isabella II from 1840 to 1843.
- Francisco Serrano, duke of la Torre, during the interregnum between the reigns of Isabella II and Amadeo I, from 1868 to 1871.
- Antonio Cánovas del Castillo during King Alfonso XII's absence from 1874 to 1875.
- Queen Maria Christina, regent during her pregnancy after her husband's death and then for her son Alfonso XIII from 26 November 1885 – 17 May 1902.
- The Caudillo general Francisco Franco, became de facto regent for life from 1947 to 1975, after reinstating the monarchy with a vacant royal throne ultimately filled by Juan Carlos I.

==== Sweden ====
- Duchess Ingeborg (1318–1326) regent for her underage son, King Magnus, in both Sweden and Norway.
- Karl Knutsson (Bonde) (1438–1440), during the interregnum following the deposition of the king Eric XIII; later became king as Charles VIII
- Bengt Jönsson Oxenstierna (1448; together with his brother Nils Jönsson Oxenstierna), during the interregnum between the death of Christopher of Bavaria and the election of Karl Knutsson (Bonde) as king.
- Nils Jönsson Oxenstierna (1448; together with his brother Bengt Jönsson Oxenstierna), during the interregnum between the death of Christopher of Bavaria and the election of Karl Knutsson (Bonde) as king.
- Jöns Bengtsson Oxenstierna (1457; together with Erik Axelsson Tott), during the interregnum following the first deposition of King Charles VIII, and again (1465–1466), following his second deposition.
- Kettil Karlsson Vasa (1464), during the interregnum following the first deposition of King Christian I; and again (1465), following the second deposition of Charles VIII
- Erik Axelsson Tott (1457; together with Jöns Bengtsson Oxenstierna) (1466–1467), following the end of Jöns Oxenstierna's second regency.

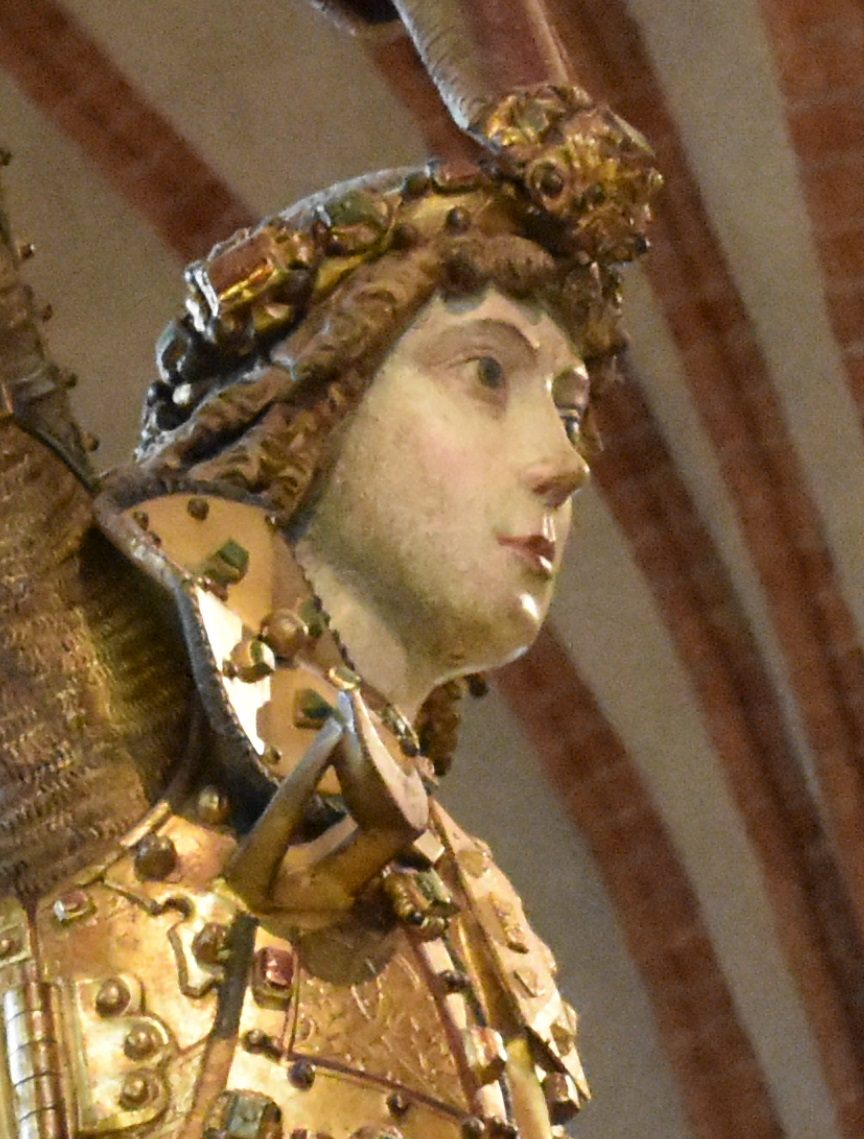
Sten Sture the Elder, long-serving regent of Sweden

- Sten Sture the Elder (1470–1497, 1501–1503) the longest-serving regent during the Kalmar Union
- Svante Nilsson (1503–1512), succeeding Sten Sture the Elder.
- Erik Trolle 1512.
- Sten Sture the Younger (1512–1520), succeeding Svante Sture.
- Gustav Eriksson Vasa was firstly regent (1521–1523) after the final dissolution of Kalmar Union, but soon was proclaimed King.
- Duke Charles of Södermanland (1599–1604) after ousting his Catholic nephew King Sigismund, until he himself claimed the throne.
- Axel Oxenstierna (1632–1644), during the minority of Queen Christina.
- Dowager Queen Hedwig Eleonora of Holstein-Gottorp (1660–1672), during the minority of her son King Charles XI, again (1697–1699), during the minority of her grandson King Charles XII, and finally, de facto, during Charles's absence from Sweden during the early years of the Great Northern War (1700–1713).
- Princess Ulrika Eleonora, during the frequent absences of her brother, Charles XII, in the later years of the Great Northern War (1713–1718)
- Charles, Duke of Södermanland (1792–1796) for his underage nephew Gustav IV Adolf, and again (1809) after Gustav IV Adolf was deposed and before Charles himself was proclaimed King Charles XIII.
- Crown Prince Charles John (1810–1818), for his adoptive father King Charles XIII, due to Charles XIII's incapacity.
- Crown Prince Charles (1857–1859), for his father King Oscar I, due to Oscar's incapacity.

==== British etc. ====
- George, Prince of Wales and Prince Regent (1811–1820), during the incapacity of his father, George III.

===== Kingdom of Great Britain =====
- After the death of Queen Anne in 1714 a regency under Lord Parker, the Lord Chief Justice, was set up while King George I was sent for to take up the crown.
- George, Prince of Wales (1716–17), during the absence of his father, George I.
- Queen Caroline of Ansbach (1729; 1732; 1735; 1736–37), during the absences of her husband, George II.

===== Kingdom of England =====
- Ælfthryth (978–984), during the minority of her son King Æthelred the Unready.
- Godwin, Earl of Wessex (c. 1026), baiulus during the absence of Cnut
- Matilda of Scotland acted as regent of England on several occasions during Henry's absences: in 1104, 1107, 1108, and 1111.
- Eleanor of Aquitaine (intermittently c. 1152–1163, 1189–1199), during the absences of her husband Henry II, then again for her son Richard I while he was on the Third Crusade.
- William Longchamp (intermittently 1189–1197), during the absences of Richard I on the Third Crusade, imprisoned in the Holy Roman Empire, and in France.
- William Marshal, 1st Earl of Pembroke (1216–1219) and then Hubert de Burgh, 1st Earl of Kent (1219–1227), during the minority of King Henry III
- Eleanor of Provence (1255) during the absence of King Henry III in France
- Henry de Lacy, Earl of Lincoln as Protector of the Realm (1290s) during Edward I's absence during the First War of Scottish Independence and Regent of the Kingdom (1311) during Edward II's absence
- A regency council headed by Henry, 3rd Earl of Lancaster (1327–1330) during the minority of Edward III
- Philippa of Hainault acted as regent in 1346, when her husband was away for the Hundred Years' War.
- John of Gaunt was de facto regent for a significant amount of time in the 1370s and 1380s. He assumed control of government after his father Edward III became mentally incapacitated from several strokes and retained substantial power throughout the minority of his nephew Richard II.
- John, Duke of Bedford (1422–1435), Humphrey, Duke of Gloucester and Henry Beaufort (1422–1437), during the minority of their nephew, Henry VI
- Richard Plantagenet, 3rd Duke of York (1454–1455; 1455–1456), during the incapacity of his cousin, Henry VI
- Richard, Duke of Gloucester (1483), during the minority of his nephew, Edward V
- Queen Catherine of Aragon (1513) while Henry VIII was in France. In this time she played a large role in the defeat of the Scots at the Battle of Flodden, and was Queen Regent for several months.
- Queen Catherine Parr (1544), while Henry VIII was in France.
- Edward Seymour, 1st Duke of Somerset (1547–1549), during the minority of his nephew, Edward VI
- John Dudley, 1st Duke of Northumberland (1550–1553), during the minority of Edward VI
- During the month of March 1617, Francis Bacon served as regent of England during the reign of King James I
- William III personally led his army into battle each year during the Nine Years' War (1689–1698). In his absence, the kingdom was administered by his wife and co-ruler Queen Mary II until her death in 1694, and thereafter by a council of seven Lord Justices (sometimes referred to as the "Lords Regent"): William Cavendish, 1st Duke of Devonshire (1640–1707), Charles Sackville, 6th Earl of Dorset (1638–1706), Sidney Godolphin, 1st Earl of Godolphin (1645–1712), Thomas Herbert, 8th Earl of Pembroke (1656–1733), Charles Talbot, 1st Duke of Shrewsbury (1660–1718), John Somers, Baron Somers (1651–1716), and Thomas Tenison, Archbishop of Canterbury.

===== Kingdom of Scotland =====
- A regency council of six Guardians existed (1286–1290) during the minority of Margaret, Maid of Norway. These were; William Fraser, Bishop of St Andrews; Donnchadh III, Earl of Fife (followed by Donnchadh IV, Earl of Fife); Alexander Comyn, Earl of Buchan; Robert Wishart, Bishop of Glasgow; James Stewart, 5th High Steward of Scotland; and John Comyn II of Badenoch
- William Wallace (1298), claiming to act as regent on behalf of the deposed King John
- Robert the Bruce, Earl of Carrick (1298–1300)
- John Comyn III of Badenoch (1298–1301; 1302–1304)
- William Lamberton, Bishop of St Andrews (1299–1301)
- Sir Ingram de Umfraville (1300–1301)
- John de Soules (1301–1304)
- Thomas Randolph, 1st Earl of Moray (1329–1332) (during the minority of David II)
- Donald, Earl of Mar (1332) (during the minority of David II)
- Sir Andrew Murray (1332) (during the minority of David II)
- Sir Archibald Douglas (1332–1333) (during the minority of David II)
- Robert Stewart, 7th High Steward of Scotland (1334–1335) (during the minority of his half-uncle David II)
- John Randolph, 3rd Earl of Moray (1334–1335) (during the minority of David II)
- Sir Andrew Murray (1335–1338) (during the minority of David II)
- Robert Stewart, 7th High Steward of Scotland (1338–1341; 1346–1357) (during the minority and later captivity of his half-uncle David II)

====== House of Stewart ======
- John Stewart, Earl of Carrick (1384–1388) (during the incapacity of his father, Robert II)
- Robert Stewart, 1st Earl of Fife (1388–1393) (during the incapacity of his father, Robert II and of his brother, Robert III)
- David Stewart, 1st Duke of Rothesay (1399–1401) (during the incapacity of his father, Robert III)
- Robert Stewart, 1st Duke of Albany (1401–1420) (during the incapacity of his brother Robert III, and then during the minority and captivity of his nephew James I)
- Murdoch Stewart, 2nd Duke of Albany (1420–1424) (during the captivity of his cousin James I)
- Queen Joan Beaufort, Queen of Scots (1437–1439) (during the minority of James II)
- Archibald Douglas, 5th Earl of Douglas (1437–1439) (during the minority of James II)
- William Crichton, 1st Lord Crichton and Sir Alexander Livingston (1439–1445) (during the minority of James II)
- William Douglas, 8th Earl of Douglas (1445–1449) (during the minority of James II)
- Queen Mary of Gueldres (1460–1463) (during the minority of her son, James III)
- James Kennedy and Gilbert Kennedy, 1st Lord Kennedy (1463–1466) (during the minority of James III)
- Robert Boyd, 1st Lord Boyd (1466–1469) (during the minority of James III)
- Patrick Hepburn (1488–1494) (during the minority of James IV)
- Queen Margaret Tudor (1513–1514) (during the minority of her son, James V)
- John Stewart, 2nd Duke of Albany (1514–1524) (during the minority of his cousin James V)
- Archibald Douglas, 6th Earl of Angus and Archbishop James Beaton (1524–1528) (during the minority of the former's stepson James V)
- James Hamilton, 2nd Earl of Arran (1542–1554) (during the minority of his cousin, Mary, Queen of Scots)
- Queen Mary of Guise (1554–1560) (during the minority of her daughter Mary, Queen of Scots)
- James Stewart, 1st Earl of Moray (1567–1570) (during the minority of his nephew James VI)
- Matthew Stewart, 4th Earl of Lennox (1570–1571) (during the minority of his grandson James VI)
- John Erskine, Earl of Mar (1571–1572) (during the minority of James VI)
- James Douglas, 4th Earl of Morton (1572–1581) (during the minority of James VI)

=== South America ===
==== Afro-Bolivian monarchy ====
- Aurora Pinedo (1958–1992), between the death of her father, Bonifacio I, and the reign of her son, Julio I

== Regents in defunct monarchies ==
The same notes apply; inclusion in this list reflects the political reality, regardless of claims to the throne.

=== Asia ===
==== China ====
- Duke of Zhou, during the minority of his nephew Song Ji, the King Cheng of Zhou until he was old enough to rule.
- Empress Lü
- Huo Guang, during the reign of Emperor Xuan of Han, the emperor reaffirmed that all important matters were to be presented to Huo before Huo would present them to the emperor. The source of title of highest imperial nobility of ancient Japan "Kanpaku" (Regent).
- Dong Zhuo, Cao Cao, Cao Pi during the reign of Emperor Xian of Han.
- Cao Zhen, Cao Xiu, Chen Qun, Sima Yi during the reign of Emperor Cao Rui.
- Cao Shuang, Sima Yi and Sima Shi during the reign of Emperor Cao Fang.
- Sima Zhao and Sima Yan during the reign of Emperor Cao Mao and Emperor Cao Huan.
- Zhuge Liang, Jiang Wan, Fei Yi during the reign of the Emperor Liu Shan.
- Zhuge Ke, Sun Jun and Sun Chen during the reign of Emperor Sun Liang.
- Empress Dowager Feng
- Wu Zetian
- Xiao Yanyan
- Empress Liu
- Empress Gao
- Yang Shiqi, Yang Rong, Yang Pu, Zhang Fu and Hu Ying during the minority of the Zhengtong Emperor from 1435 to 1442.
- Gao Gong, Zhang Juzheng, Gao Yi and Feng Bao during the minority of the Wanli Emperor from 1572 to 1582.
- Dorgon, Jierhalang and Duoduo as Prince-Regent, from 1643 to 1650 during the minority of his nephew Fulin, the Shunzhi Emperor.
- Sonin, Suksaha, Ebilun and Oboi during the minority of the Kangxi Emperor from 1661 to their various deaths or downfalls. The last one, Oboi fell from grace in 1669.
- Zaiyuan, Duanhua, Sushun, Jingshou, Muyin, Kuangyuan, Du Han and Jiao Youying during the minority of the Tongzhi Emperor in 1861.
- Empress Dowager Ci'an (1861–1873, 1875–1881), Empress Dowager Cixi (1861–1873, 1875–1889, 1898–1908) and Yixin (1861–1865) during the minority of the Tongzhi Emperor and de facto ruler for almost the entire reign of the Guangxu Emperor.
- Zaifeng, between 1908 and 1911 for his son Puyi, Empress Dowager Longyu (1908–1912) abdicated monarchy on behalf of Puyi in 1912.

==== Afghanistan ====
Before the 1881 unification, there were essentially four rulers' capitals: Kabul, Herat, Qandahar and Peshawar (the last now in Pakistan); all their rulers belonged to the Abdali tribal group, whose name was changed to Dorrani with Ahmad Shah Abdali. They belong either to the Saddozay segment of the Popalzay clan (typically styled padshah, king) or to the Mohammadzay segment of the Barakzay clan (typically with the style Amir, in full Amir al-Mo´menin "Leader of the Faithful"). The Mohammadzay also furnished the Saddozay kings frequently with top counselors, who served occasionally as (Minister-)regents, identified with the epithet Mohammadzay.

==== Ahom Kingdom ====
- Queen Phuleshwari (1722–1732) of Ahom kingdom
- Queen Ambika (1732–1739) of Ahom kingdom
- Queen Sarbeswari (1739–1744) of Ahom kingdom

==== Madurai ====
- Rani Mangammal (1684–1703) of Madurai Nayak dynasty

==== Mughal Empire ====
- Bairam Khan (1556–1560) during the minority of Akbar

==== Vijayanagara Empire ====
- Tuluva Narasa Nayaka for Thimma Bhupala (1491) and Narasimha Raya II. (1491–1505) Following Narasimha II's assassination, Narasa's son, Viranarasimha Raya, would be crowned emperor.
- Aliya Rama Raya for Sadasiva Raya. (1542 to 1556)

==== Qutub Shahi dynasty ====
- Saif Khan for Subhan Quli Qutb Shah. (1550)

==== Travancore ====
Both before and during the British Raj (colonial rule), most of India was ruled by several hundred native princely houses, many of which have known regencies, under the raj subject to British approval

- Maharani Gowri Lakshmi Bayi of Travancore (1811–1815)
- Maharani Gowri Parvati Bayi (1815–1849)
- Maharani Sethu Lakshmi Bayi (1924–1931)

==== Vakataka Kingdom ====
- Prabhavati (ca. 390–410)

==== Iran ====
- Rinnu (132 BC), during the minority of her son Phraates II.
- Ifra Hormizd (309–325), during the minority of her son Shapur II.
- Denag (457–459), during a civil war between her sons Peroz I and Hormizd III.
- Mah-Adhur Gushnasp (628–629), elected as regent for Ardashir III.
- Farrukhan the Little (740/41–747/48), during the minority of his nephew Khurshid.
- Abu Abdallah Jayhani (914–922), appointed regent for the underage Nasr II.
- Terken Khatun (1092–1094), during the minority of her son Mahmud I.
- Div Sultan Rumlu (1524–1527), regent of the underage Tahmasp I.
- Malek Jahan Khanom (1848), regent during the transition of power from Mohammad Shah Qajar to Naser al-Din Shah Qajar.
- Ali-Reza Khan (1909–1914), during the minority of his nephew Ahmad Shah Qajar.
- Naser-al-molk (1911–1914), during the minority of Ahmad Shah Qajar.
- Mohammad Hassan Mirza (1924-1925), during the permanent departure of Ahmad Shah Qajar.

===== Proposed regents =====
- Farah Diba, regent if Mohammad Reza Pahlavi died while as shah. Following the Iranian Revolution in 1979, the Pahlavi dynasty were overthrown, which meant that Farah couldn't be the regent. She led the Pahlavi dynasty as the regent-in-pretence following her husband's death in 1980, which lasted from July to October 1980 until her son, Reza Pahlavi, proclaimed himself Shah of Iran.

==== Iraq ====
In the short-lived Hashemite kingdom, there were three regencies in the reign of the third and last king Faysal II (b. 1935 – d. 1958; also Head of the 'Arab Union', a federation with the Hashemite sister-kingdom Jordan, from 14 February 1958) :

- 4 April 1939 – 1 April 1941 Prince 'Abd al-Ilah (1st time) (b. 1913 – d. 1958)
- 1 April 1941 – 1 June 1941 Sharaf ibn Rajih al-Fawwaz (b. 1880 – d. 1955)
- 1 June 1941 – 2 May 1953 Crown Prince 'Abd al-Ilah (2nd time)

==== Korea ====
- Queen Mother Buyeo, regent for King Taejo of Goguryeo
- Queen Jiso, regent for King Jinheung of Silla
- Queen Sinmok, regent for King Hyoso of Silla
- Queen Gyeongsu, regent for King Hyegong of Silla
- Queen Cheonchu, regent for King Mokjong of Goryeo
- Queen Sasuk, regent for King Heonjong of Goryeo
- Princess Deoknyeong, regent for King Chungmok and King Chungjeong of Goryeo
- Queen Gongwon, regent for King U of Goryeo
- Queen Jeonghui, regent for King Yejong and King Seongjong of Joseon
- Queen Insu regent for King Yejong and King Seongjong of Joseon
- Queen Munjeong, regent for King Myeongjong of Joseon
- Queen Insun, regent for King Seonjo of Joseon
- Queen Jeongsun, regent for King Sunjo of Joseon
- Queen Sunwon, regent for King Heonjong and King Cheoljong of Joseon
- Queen Sinjeong, regent for King Gojong of Joseon
- Heungseon Daewongun, regent for King Gojong of Joseon
- Queen Min, regent for King Gojong of Joseon

==== Mongolia ====
- Tolui, the son of Genghis Khan of the Mongol Empire
- Töregene, the Great Khatun of the Mongol Empire
- Oghul Qaimish, the wife of Güyük Khan

==== Myanmar ====
- Naratheinga Uzana: (1230/31–1235), during the reign of King Htilominlo
- Athinkhaya: (1297–1310), co-regent with his two brothers during the reign of puppet King Saw Hnit
- Yazathingyan: (1297–1312/13), co-regent
- Thihathu: (1297–1313), co-regent, unilaterally declared himself king in 1309
- Sithu of Pinya: (1340–1344), after the abdication of King Uzana I of Pinya
- Maha Dewi: (1383–1384), Princess-Regent during the last weeks of her brother King Binnya U

==== Mysore ====
- Lakshmi Ammani Devi, regent during the minority of Krishnaraja Wadiyar III. (1799–1810)
- Kempananjammanni Devi, regent during the minority of Krishna Raja Wadiyar IV. (1895–1902)

==== Nepal ====
- Prince Gyanendra was regent following the murder of his brother King Birendra, during the four-day coma of Birenda's son King Dipendra upon whose death he succeeded as King

==== Ryukyu ====
- Ogiyaka, queen regent for Shō Shin of the Ryukyu Kingdom. (1477–1505)
- Aragusuku Anki, later Urasoe Ryōken, head of the Sanshikan and regent for Shō Gen. (1556–1566)
- Yonabaru Ryōtō, head of the Sanshikan and regent for Shō Sei. (1802–1803)
- Kuniyoshi Chōshō, later Sakuma Seimō and then Kōchi Chōken, head of the Sanshikan and regent for Shō Tai. (1848–1857)

==== Tibetan Empire ====
- Khri ma lod for her son Tridu Songtsen (675–689) and again for her grandson Me Agtsom (704–712)

==== Turkey ====
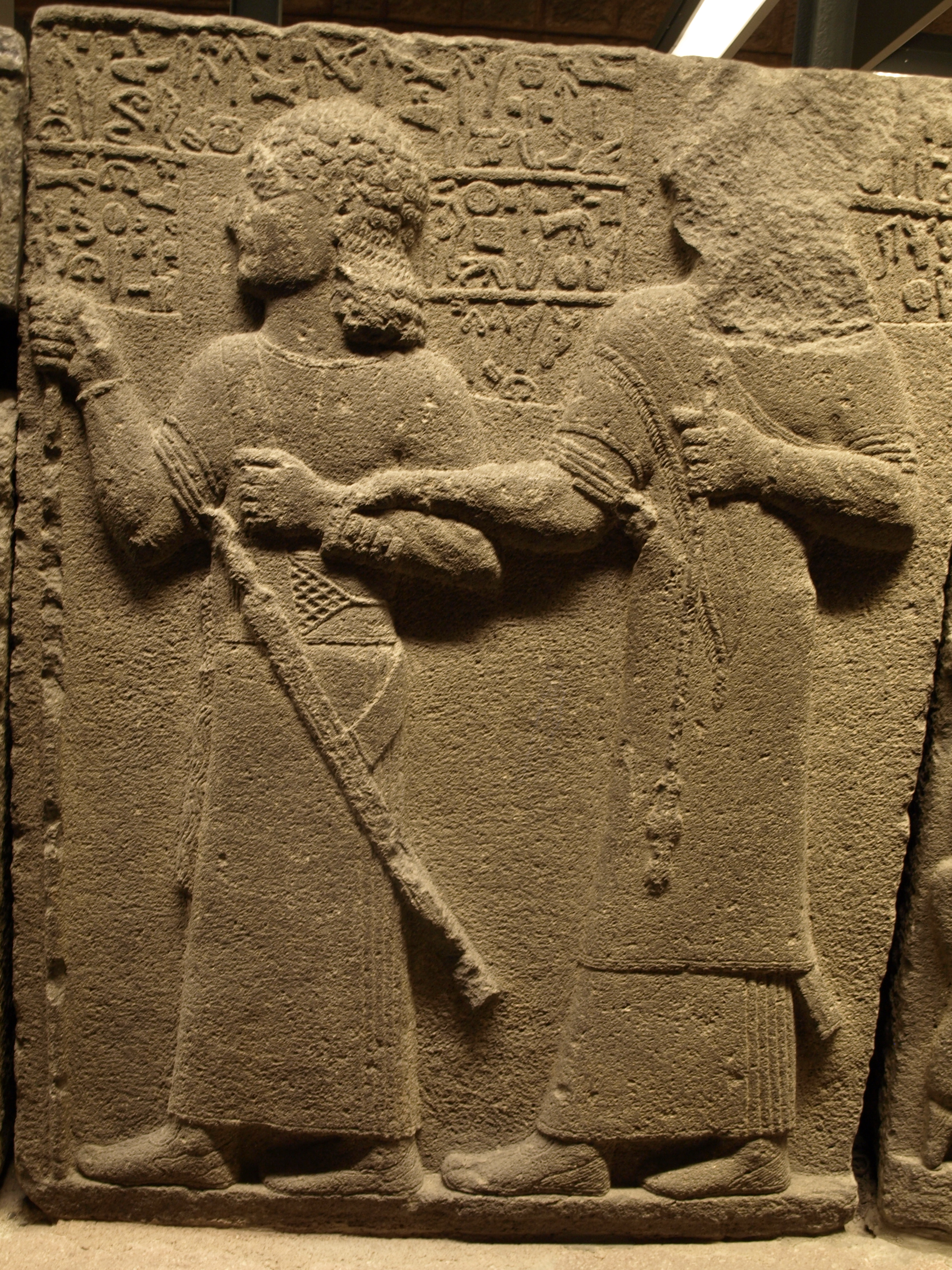
The regent Yariri (r.) and his successor Kamani (l.), on a relief from Carchemish. An example of regency from ancient history.

- Yariri for the later king Kamani in the Neo-Hittite state of Carchemish located at the present-day border of Turkey and Syria (early to mid 8th century BC).
- Kösem Sultan, Naib-i-Sultanat (regent) of the Ottoman Empire during the minority of her son Murad IV (10 September 1623 – 18 May 1632), during the unstable reign of her younger son Ibrahim (8 February 1640 – 8 August 1648) and during the early reign of her grandson Mehmed IV (8 August 1648 – 2 September 1651)
- Turhan Sultan, Naib-i-Sultanat (regent) of the Ottoman Empire during the minority of her son Mehmed IV (2 September 1651 – 2 June 1656)

==== Vietnam ====
- Queen Jiu during the reign of her son King Zhao Xing.
- Lê Hoàn and Empress Dowager Dương Vân Nga during the short reign of her son Emperor Đinh Phế Đế (lit. Deposed Emperor Dinh), after her husband Emperor Đinh Tiên Hoàng was assassinated.
- Empress Mother Linh Nhân, while her husband Emperor Lý Thánh Tông led a military campaign against the kingdom of Champa (1st time) and again, during the reign of her son Emperor Lý Nhân Tông (2nd time).
- Empress Mother Linh Chiếu (1138–1158) for her son Emperor Lý Anh Tông.
- Trần Thừa and Trần Thủ Độ during the reign of Emperor Trần Thái Tông. Trần Thừa also called Retired Emperor Trần Thái Tổ, is Emperor Trần Thái Tông's father. He was the only "Emperor" who did not held the throne of the Trần dynasty. Grand Chancellor Trần Thủ Độ is Trần Thái Tông's uncle.
- Hồ Quý Ly, during the reign of Trần dynasty's emperors – Trần Thuận Tông & Trần Thiếu Đế; and later, the reign of his son – Emperor Hồ Hán Thương of Hồ dynasty.
- Empress Mother Tuyên Từ (1443–1453), during the reign of her son Emperor Lê Nhân Tông.
- Consort Tuyên – Đặng Thị Huệ (Consort of Lord Trịnh Sâm) during the reign of her son, Lord Trịnh Cán.

=== Africa ===
==== Egypt ====
- Queen Neithhotep for either Hor-Aha or Djer (c. 3000 B.C.)
- Queen Merneith for Den of Egypt (c. 2950 B.C.)
- Queen Nimaathap for Djoser (c. 2686 B.C.)
- Queen Khentkaus I for an unknown pharaoh
- Queen Khentkaus II for Nyuserre Ini
- Queen Iput I for Pepi I (c. 2332 B.C.)
- Queen Ankhesenpepi II for Pepi II (c. 2278 B.C.)
- Queen Ahhotep I for Ahmose I (c. 1550 B.C.)
- Queen Ahmose-Nefertari for Amenhotep I (c. 1526 B.C.)
- Queen Hatshepsut for Thutmose III of Egypt during the early part of his reign before she became co-ruling Pharaoh in her own right (c. 1479–1472 B.C.)
- Queen Mutemwiya for Amenhotep III (c. 1388 B.C.)
- General Horemheb for Tutankhamun (c. 1332–1323 B.C.)
- Queen Twosret for Siptah (c. 1197–1191 B.C.)
- Prince Tjahapimu for Djedhor during his military campaigns against the Achaemenid Empire (c. 360 B.C.)
- Minister Agathocles for Ptolemy V (c. 204–202 B.C.)
- Governor Tlepolemus for Ptolemy V (c. 202–201 B.C.)
- Minister Aristomenes for Ptolemy V (c. 201–196 B.C.)
- Queen Cleopatra I for Ptolemy VI (c. 180–176 B.C.)
- Eulaeus and Lenaeus for Ptolemy VI (c. 176–170 B.C.)
- Pothinus for Ptolemy XIII (c. 51–48 B.C.)
- Commander Abu al-Misk Kafur for Abu'l-Qasim Unujur ibn al-Ikhshid and Abu'l-Hasan Ali ibn al-Ikhshid (946–966 A.D.)
- Vizier Ja'far ibn al-Furat for Abu'l-Fawaris Ahmad ibn Ali (968 and 969)
- Prince Al-Hasan ibn Ubayd Allah ibn Tughj for Abu'l-Fawaris Ahmad ibn Ali (968–969)
- Wasita Barjawan for Al-Hakim bi-Amr Allah (996–1000)
- Princess Sitt al-Mulk for Al-Zahir li-i'zaz Din Allah (1021–1023)
- Vizier Ali ibn Ahmad al-Jarjara'i for Al-Mustansir Billah (1036–1045)
- Caliph Mother Rasad for Al-Mustansir Billah (1045–1062)
- Prince Al-Hafiz for At-Tayyib Abu'l-Qasim (1130)
- Vizier Kutayfat for At-Tayyib Abu'l-Qasim (1130–1131)
- Vizier Tala'i ibn Ruzzik for Al-Fa'iz bi-Nasr Allah and Al-Adid (1154–1161)
- Sultana Shajar al-Durr following the death of her husband As-Salih Ayyub (1249–1250)
- Atabak Aybak for Al-Ashraf Musa (1250–1254)
- Emir Qalawun for Solamish (1279)
- Emir Al-Adil Kitbugha for Al-Nasir Muhammad (1293–1294)
- Emir Baibars al-Jashankir for Al-Nasir Muhammad (1299–1304)
- Viceroy Sayf al-Din Salar for Al-Nasir Muhammad (1299–1304)
- Emir Qawsun for Al-Ashraf Kujuk (1341–1342)
- Emir Yalbugha al-Umari for Al-Mansur Muhammad and Al-Ashraf Sha'ban (1361–1366)
- Emir Barquq for Al-Mansur Ali II and As-Salih Hajji (1377–1382)
- Prince Mohammed Ali Tewfik, Aziz Ezzat Pasha, Sherif Sabri Pasha for King Farouk I of Egypt (1936–1937)
- Prince Muhammad Abdul Moneim, Bahey El Din Barakat Pasha, Rashad Mehanna for King Fuad II of Egypt (1952–1953)

==== Ethiopia ====
- Sofya of Axum was regent during the minority of her son Ezana (c. 320s AD).
- Romna Wark served as regent during the minority of her son Eskender.
- Eleni of Ethiopia served as regent between 1507 and 1516 during the minority of Emperor Dawit II.
- Mentewab for her son Iyasu II.
- Ras Tessema Nadew in 1913 during the minority of Iyasu who would have been crowned as Iyasu V
- Tafari Makonnen from 1916 to 1931 during the reign of a female, Empress Zewditu (Queen of Kings, Nigiste Negestatt). Upon her death, the regent himself ascended the throne and was crowned as Emperor Haile Selassie I (King of Kings, Negusa Nagast)

=== Americas ===
==== Brazil ====
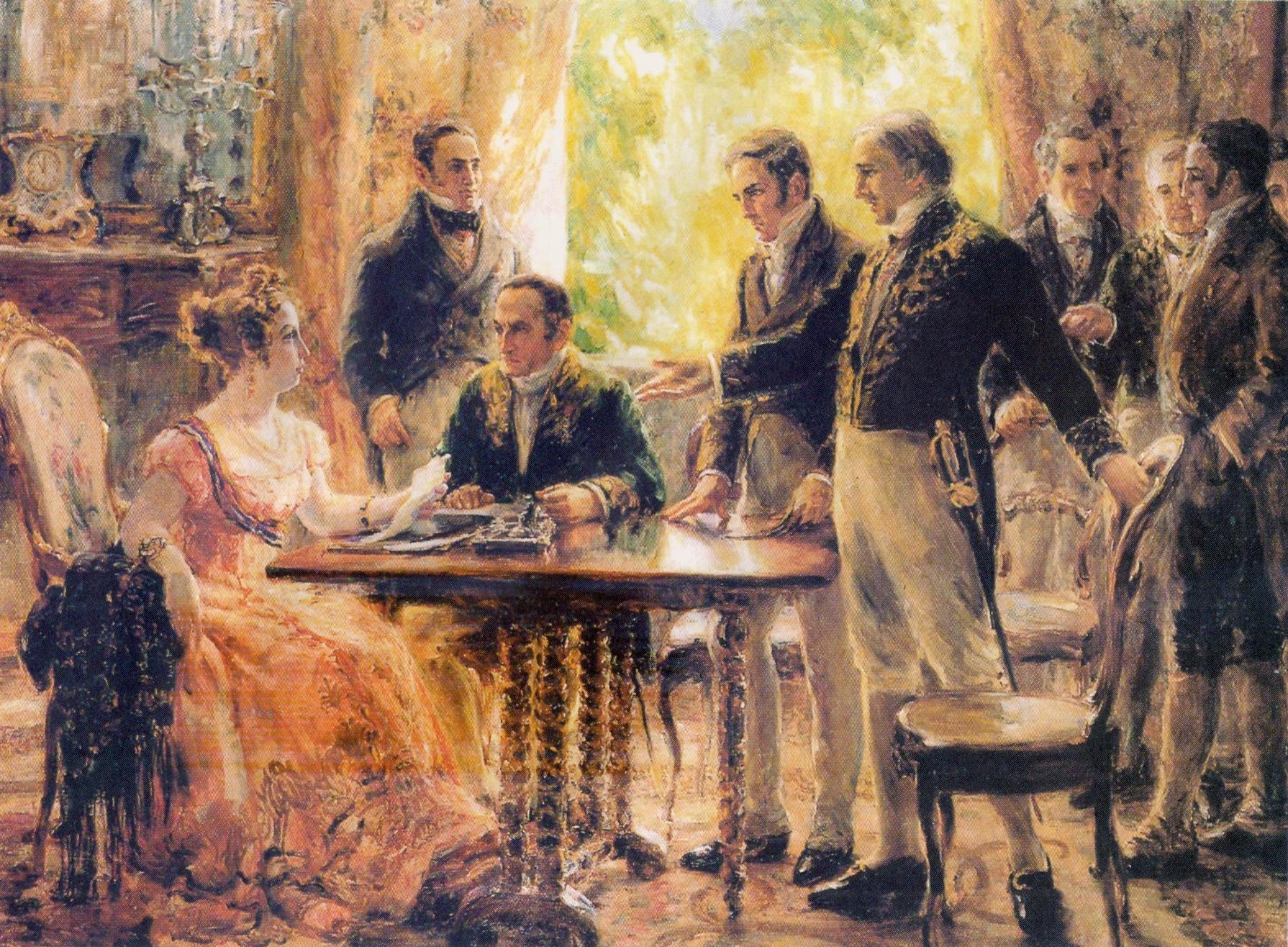
Princess Maria Leopoldina acting as regent of the Kingdom of Brazil on behalf of her husband Prince Pedro in 1822, as depicted in Sessão do Conselho de Estado

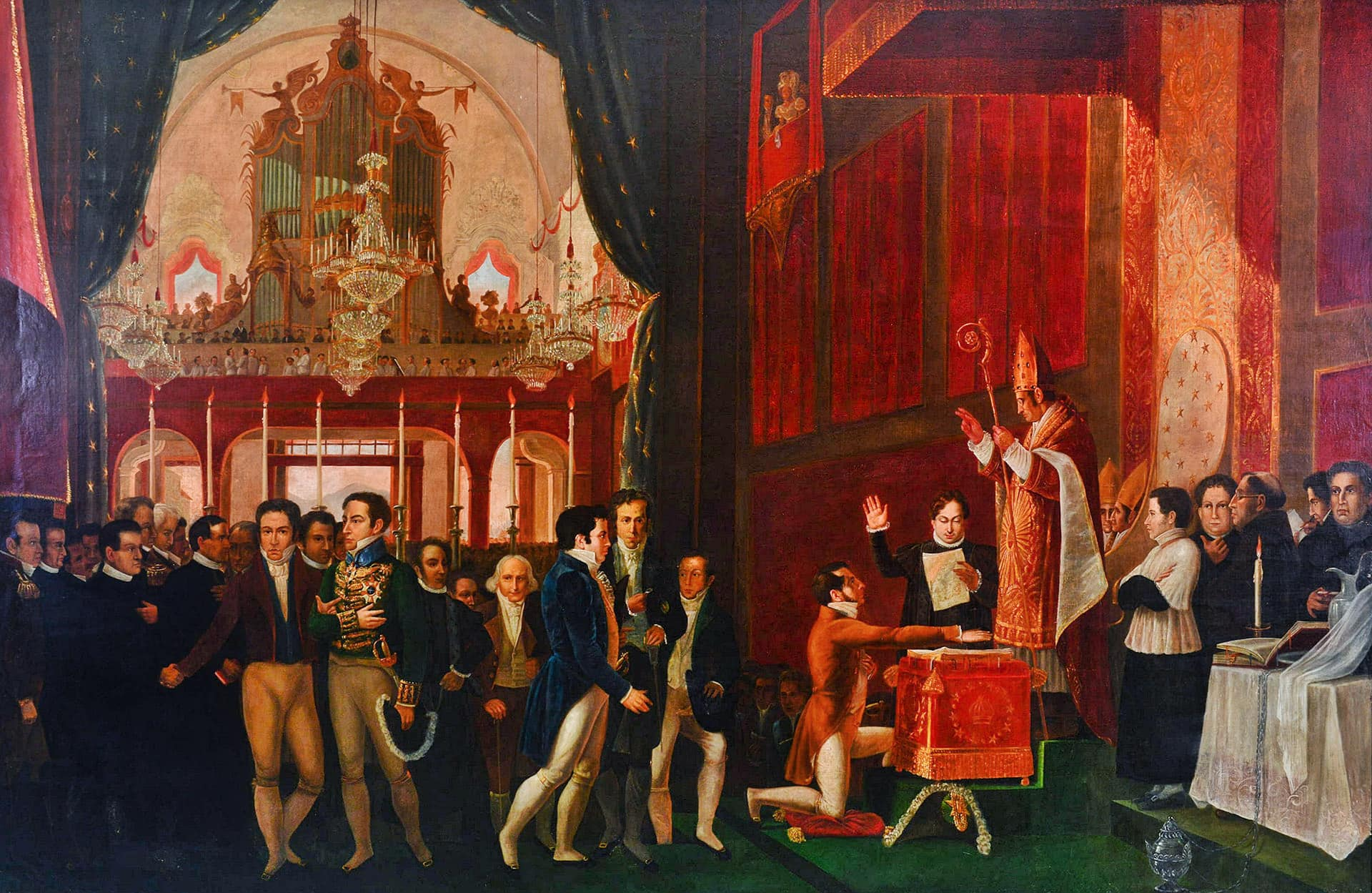
The oath of the provisional triumviral regents of the Empire of Brazil in 1831, during the Regency period.

Isabel, Princess Imperial taking oath as regent of the Empire of Brazil on behalf of her father Pedro II, c. 1870

- John, Prince Regent, was responsible for elevating Brazil to the status of Kingdom in 1815. One year later, he was acclaimed King of Portugal, Brazil and Algarves.
- Pedro, Prince Regent, was responsible for declaring the independence of Brazil, in 1822, during his regency (1820–1822), after his father, John VI, returned to Portugal. Some months later, he would be acclaimed Emperor of Brazil.
- Maria Leopoldina, Empress consort of Brazil, acted as Empress Regent while her husband, Pedro I, was away – especially during the war against Uruguay.
- Provisional Triumviral Regency – from 7 April to 18 June 1831, comprised José Joaquim Carneiro de Campos, Marquess of Caravelas, Nicolau Pereira de Campos Vergueiro and Francisco de Lima e Silva, was formed to rule the country after the abdication of Pedro I.
- Permanent Triumviral Regency – from 18 June 1831 to 12 October 1835, comprised Francisco de Lima e Silva as well as José da Costa Carvalho and João Bráulio Muniz.
- Diogo Antônio Feijó – from 12 October 1835 to 19 September 1837, during what was considered the advance of the Liberal Party
- Pedro de Araújo Lima, Marquis of Olinda – from 1837 (provisional to 1838) to 1840, during what was considered the retaken of the Conservative Party.
- Isabel, Princess Imperial of Brazil, was Princess Regent of the Empire of Brazil three times (1871–1872; 1876–1877; 1887–1888) while her father travelled abroad. During her last regency, she signed the abolition of slavery in Brazil (known as the "Lei Áurea", or "Golden Law"), on 13 May 1888, whereby Isabel got the sobriquet Isabel the Redeemer. For the act of signing the Golden Law, she was awarded the Golden Rose by Pope Leo XIII.

==== Mexico ====
- Carlota, Empress consort of Mexico (1864–1867), assisted her husband Maximilian I of Mexico, who let her rule as regent during his absences from Mexico City.

=== Europe ===
==== Austria ====
- William, Duke of Austria (1404–1406), during the minority of his cousin, Duke Albert V.
- Leopold IV, Duke of Austria and Ernest, Duke of Austria (1406–1411), for the same reason.
- Frederick IV, Duke of Austria (1524–1535), during the minorities of his nephews, Dukes Frederick V and Albert VI.
- Frederick V, Duke of Austria during the minorities of his cousins, Dukes Sigismund (1439–1446) and Ladislaus the Posthumous (1440–1452).
- Archduke Ernest of Austria (1590–1593), during the minority of his cousin, Ferdinand III, Archduke of Inner Austria.
- Maximilian III, Archduke of Austria (1593–1595), for the same reason.
- Claudia de' Medici (1632–1646), during the minority of her son, Ferdinand Charles, Archduke of Austria.
- For most of the reign of the epileptic and severely disabled Emperor Ferdinand I (1835–1848), Ferdinand's uncle, Archduke Ludwig (from 1836 to 1848), acted as a de facto regent.

==== Bulgaria ====
- Stefan Stambolov, during the absence of Prince Alexander Battenberg from the Bulgarian throne between 28 August 1886 and 3 September 1886 and the vacancy of the throne between 7 September 1886 and 14 August 1887.
- Kiril, Prince of Preslav and Bogdan Filov and Nikola Mikhov together as Regency Council, during the minority of the former's nephew Simeon II (1943–1944).
- Venelin Ganev and Todor Pavlov and Tsvetko Boboshevski together as Regency Council, during the minority of Simeon II (1944–1946)

==== Finland ====
After the abdication of Nicholas II of Russia, the throne of the Grand Duke of Finland was vacant and according to the constitution of 1772, a regent was installed by the Finnish Parliament during the first two years of Finnish independence, before the country was declared a republic.

- Pehr Evind Svinhufvud, installed in January 1918, resigned in late 1918.
- Baron Carl Gustaf Emil Mannerheim, resigned 1919 with the passing of the new constitution.

==== France ====
- Queen Anne of Kiev and Baldwin V, Count of Flanders (1060–1066), during the minority of her son and his nephew Philip I
- Suger, Abbot of St. Denis (1147–1149), during the absence of Louis VII on the Second Crusade
- Queen Adèle of Champagne and Guillaume de Champagne, Archbishop of Reims (1190–1191), during the absence of her son Philip II on the Third Crusade.
- Queen Blanche of Castile (1226–1234), during the minority of her son Louis IX
- Queen Blanche of Castile (1248–1252) and Alphonse, Count of Poitou and Toulouse (1248–1254), during the absence of her son and his brother Louis IX on the Seventh Crusade.
- Mathieu de Vendôme, Abbot of Saint-Denis and Simon de Clermont, Sieur de Nesle, during the absence of Louis IX on the Eighth Crusade (1270).
- Philip the Tall (1316), during the interregnum between the death of his brother Louis X and the birth of Louis' posthumous son John I, and during the minority of the short-lived John I.
- Philip, Count of Valois and Anjou (1328), from the death of his cousin Charles IV until the birth of a posthumous daughter to the late king brought about Valois' own accession to the throne.
- Queen Joan the Lame (1340) during absence of her husband Philip VI.
- Queen Joan the Lame (1345–1346) during absence of her husband Philip VI.
- Queen Joan the Lame (1347) during absence of her husband Philip VI.
- Charles, the Dauphin (1356–1360), during the captivity of his father in England
- Louis I, Duke of Anjou (1380–1382), during the minority of his nephew Charles VI
- Jean, Duke of Berry, Philippe II, Duke of Burgundy, and Louis II, Duke of Bourbon (1382–1388), during the minority of their nephew, Charles VI
- Louis II, Duke of Bourbon and John, Duke of Berry (1392–1407), during the insanity of their nephew, Charles VI
- Queen Isabella of Bavaria (1417–1420) and then Henry V of England, during the insanity of her husband and his father-in-law, Charles VI; they were opposed by
- Charles, the Dauphin (1417–1422), Charles VI's eldest surviving son, who also claimed the regency.
- John, Duke of Bedford (1422–1435), acting as regent on behalf of his nephew, the young Henry VI of England in opposition to the king Charles VII
- Queen Charlotte of Savoy (1465) during the absence of her husband Louis XI
- Anne of France and her husband Pierre de Beaujeu (1483–1491), during the minority of her brother, Charles VIII
- Louise of Savoy:
  - (1515–1516), during the absence of her son, Francis I, in Italy.
  - (1523–1526), during the absence at war in Italy, and then the captivity, of her son, Francis I.
- Queen Catherine de' Medici:
  - (1552) While her husband Henry II left the kingdom for the campaign of Metz.
  - (1560–1563) During the minority of her second son, Charles IX
  - (1574) During the absence of her third son, Henry III, in Poland
- Queen Marie de' Medici (1610–1614), during the minority of her son, Louis XIII
- Queen Anne of Austria (1643–1651), during the minority of her son Louis XIV
- Philippe II, Duke of Orléans (1715–1723), during the minority of Louis XV; often called "the Regent", since he was the last regent of France. **The related era and style are commonly referred to as the Régence (analogous to the British Regency period).
  - A 136 carat (27.2 g) diamond he acquired in 1717 is known as 'le régent'
- Louis-Stanislas-Xavier, comte de Provence, while living in exile, self-declared regent for his nephew Louis XVII after the 1793 guillotining of King Louis XVI, until the young pretender's death in 1795.
- Charles-Philippe de France, comte d'Artois, appointed Lieutenant General of the Kingdom by a temporary government from 14 April 1814 until Louis XVIII arrived from England.
- Empress Eugenie, three times for her husband, Napoleon III, during his absence.

==== Georgia and its predecessor realms ====
- Ghadana of Armenia, queen regent of the Kingdom of Iberia
- Ketevan the Martyr, queen regent of the Kingdom of Kakheti

==== Greece ====
- Josef Ludwig von Armansperg, Carl Wilhelm von Heideck, Georg Ludwig von Maurer, Egid von Kobell, Johann Baptist von Greiner (1833–1835): on behalf of the minor King Otto.
- Prince Johann of Schleswig-Holstein-Sonderburg-Glücksburg (1867): on behalf of George I while he was on a tour in Europe.
- Pavlos Kountouriotis (1920): following the death of King Alexander.
- Olga Constantinovna of Russia (1920): until the conclusion of a referendum on the return of King Constantine I.
- Pavlos Kountouriotis (1923–1924): on behalf of the minor King George II.
- Georgios Kondylis (1935): on behalf of the minor King George II.
- Archbishop Damaskinos (1944–1946): on behalf of King George II until his return after World War II.
- Crown Prince Constantine (1964): on behalf of the ill King Paul.
- General Georgios Zoitakis (1967–1972): appointed by the military junta of the time when the last reigning king, Constantine II of Greece, fled to exile after a failed royal countercoup.
- Military dictator Colonel Georgios Papadopoulos (1972–1973): then Prime Minister, assumed the additional role of regent until the monarchy was abolished by the junta in 1973.

==== German Empire ====
===== Anhalt =====
- Matilda of Brunswick-Lüneburg (1266–1270), during the minority of her sons, Otto I, Prince of Anhalt-Aschersleben and Henry III, Prince of Anhalt-Aschersleben.
- Margaret of Münsterberg (1516–1524), during the minority of her sons, Joachim I, Prince of Anhalt-Dessau, John V, Prince of Anhalt-Zerbst, and George III, Prince of Anhalt-Dessau.
- Augustus, Prince of Anhalt-Plötzkau first (1621–1643), during the minority of his nephew, John VI, Prince of Anhalt-Zerbst, and later (1650–1653), during the minority of his nephew, William Louis, Prince of Anhalt-Köthen.
- Lebrecht, Prince of Anhalt-Plötzkau and Emmanuel, Prince of Anhalt-Plötzkau (1653–1659), during the minority of their cousin, William Louis, Prince of Anhalt-Köthen.
- Sophie Augusta of Holstein-Gottorp (1667–1674), during the minority of her son, Charles, Prince of Anhalt-Zerbst.
- Anna Eleonore of Stolberg-Wernigerode (1670–1690), during the minority of her son, Emmanuel Lebrecht, Prince of Anhalt-Köthen.
- John George II, Prince of Anhalt-Dessau (1690–1692), during the minority of his cousin, Emmanuel Lebrecht, Prince of Anhalt-Köthen.
- Countess Henriette Catherine of Nassau (1693–1698), during the minority of her son, Leopold I, Prince of Anhalt-Dessau.
- Gisela Agnes of Rath (1704–1715), during the minority of her son, Leopold, Prince of Anhalt-Köthen.
- Joanna Elisabeth of Holstein-Gottorp (1747–1752), during the minority of her son, Frederick Augustus, Prince of Anhalt-Zerbst.
- Dietrich of Anhalt-Dessau (1751–1758), during the minority of his nephew, Leopold III, Duke of Anhalt-Dessau.
- Leopold III, Duke of Anhalt-Dessau (1812–1817), during the minority of his cousin, Louis Augustus, Duke of Anhalt-Köthen.
- Leopold IV, Duke of Anhalt-Dessau (1817–1818), during the minority of his cousin, Louis Augustus, Duke of Anhalt-Köthen.
- Prince Aribert (1918), during the minority of his nephew, Duke Joachim Ernst.

===== Baden =====
- Albert V, Duke of Bavaria (1569–1577), during the minority of his nephew, Philip II, Margrave of Baden-Baden.
- Countess Palatine Anna of Veldenz (1577–1584), during the minority of her son, Ernest Frederick, Margrave of Baden-Durlach.
- Sibylle of Saxe-Lauenburg (1707–1727), during the minority of her son, Louis George, Margrave of Baden-Baden.
- Magdalena Wilhelmine of Württemberg (1738–1742), during the minority of her grandson, Margrave Charles Frederick of Baden-Durlach.
- Prince Frederick (1852–1856), during the incapacity of his brother, Grand Duke Louis II.

===== Bavaria =====
- Agnes of Loon (1183–1191), during the minority of her son, Louis I, Duke of Bavaria.
- Matilda of Habsburg (1294–1296), during the minority of her son, Rudolf I, Duke of Bavaria.
- Albert VI, Duke of Bavaria (1651–1654), during the minority of his nephew, Ferdinand Maria, Elector of Bavaria.
- Maximilian Philipp Hieronymus, Duke of Bavaria-Leuchtenberg (1679–1680), during the minority of his nephew, Maximilian II Emanuel, Elector of Bavaria.
- Prince Luitpold (1886–1912), during the incapacity of his nephews, Ludwig II and Otto.
- Prince Ludwig (1912–1913), during the incapacity of his cousin, Otto.

===== Brunswick =====
- Albert I, Duke of Brunswick (1277–1279), during the minority of his nephew, Otto II, Duke of Brunswick-Lüneburg.
- Frederick I, Duke of Brunswick-Osterode (1383–1401), during the minority of his nephew, Eric I, Duke of Brunswick-Grubenhagen.
- Albert II, Duke of Brunswick-Grubenhagen (1464–1479), during the minority of his nephew, Henry IV, Duke of Brunswick-Grubenhagen.
- Anne of Nassau-Siegen (1479–1486), during the minority of her son, Henry I, Duke of Brunswick.
- Elisabeth of Brandenburg and Philip I, Landgrave of Hesse (1540–1545), during the minority of the former's son, Eric II, Duke of Brunswick-Lüneburg.
- Elizabeth of Denmark (1616–1622), during the incapacity of her son, Frederick Ulrich, Duke of Brunswick-Lüneburg.
- George, Prince of Wales, later King George IV of the United Kingdom (1815–1823), during the minority of his cousin, Duke Charles II.
- Prince Albrecht of Prussia (1885–1906), during the interregnum following the death of Duke Wilhelm in 1884, when the throne could not be filled due to the status of the heir, the Duke of Cumberland, as an enemy of the Reich.
- Duke Johann Albrecht of Mecklenburg-Schwerin (1907–1913), for the same reason.

===== Hanover =====
- George, Prince of Wales (1814–1820), due to the insanity of his father, King George III.

===== Hesse-Darmstadt =====
- Elisabeth Dorothea of Saxe-Gotha-Altenburg (1678–1686), during the minority of her son, Ernest Louis, Landgrave of Hesse-Darmstadt.

===== Hesse-Homburg =====
- Margaret Elisabeth of Leiningen-Westerburg (1638–1648), during the minority of her son, William Christoph, Landgrave of Hesse-Homburg.
- Princess Ulrike Louise of Solms-Braunfels (1751–1766), during the minority of her son, Frederick V, Landgrave of Hesse-Homburg.

===== Hesse-Kassel =====
- Countess Amalie Elisabeth of Hanau-Münzenberg (1637–1650), during the minority of her son, William VI, Landgrave of Hesse-Kassel.
- Princess Hedwig Sophie of Brandenburg (1663–1677), during the minorities of her sons, William VII, Landgrave of Hesse-Kassel and Charles I, Landgrave of Hesse-Kassel.
- Electoral Prince Frederick William (1831–1847), due to the incapacity of his father, Elector William II.

===== Lippe =====
- Pauline of Anhalt-Bernburg (1802–1820), during the minority of her son, Prince Leopold II.
- Prince Adolf of Schaumburg-Lippe (1895–1897), due to the incapacity of his cousin, Prince Alexander.
- Count Ernst of Lippe-Biesterfeld (1897–1904), for the same reason.
- Count Leopold of Lippe-Biesterfeld (1904–1905), for the same reason.

===== Mecklenburg-Schwerin =====
- Duke Johann Albrecht of Mecklenburg-Schwerin (1897–1901), due to the minority of his nephew, Grand Duke Friedrich Franz IV.

===== Mecklenburg-Strelitz =====
- Friedrich Franz IV, Grand Duke of Mecklenburg-Schwerin (1918), due to the near extinction of the Mecklenburg-Strelitz line.

===== Prussia =====
- Prince William (1858–1861), during the incapacity of his brother Frederick William IV.

===== Württemberg =====
- Charles Frederick II, Duke of Württemberg-Oels during minority of Charles Eugene, Duke of Württemberg
- Princess Marie Auguste of Thurn and Taxis (1737–1740), during the minority of her son, Charles Eugene, Duke of Württemberg

===== Saxe-Altenburg =====
- John George II, Elector of Saxony (1669–1672), during the minority of his nephew, Duke Friedrich Wilhelm III.

===== Saxe-Coburg and Gotha =====
- Prince Ernst of Hohenlohe-Langenburg (1900–1905), during the minority of his cousin, Duke Charles Edward.

===== Saxe-Gotha-Altenburg =====
- Bernhard I, Duke of Saxe-Meiningen and Henry, Duke of Saxe-Römhild (1691–1693), during the minority of their nephew, Duke Frederick II.

===== Saxe-Eisenach =====
- John George I, Duke of Saxe-Marksuhl (1668–1671), during the minority of his nephew, Duke William August.

===== Saxe-Hildburghausen =====
- Sophia Albertine of Erbach-Erbach (1724–1728), during the minority of her son, Duke Ernest Frederick II.
- Caroline of Erbach-Fürstenau (1745–1748), during the minority of her son, Duke Ernest Frederick III.
- Prince Joseph of Saxe-Hildburghausen (1780–1787), during the minority of his great-grandnephew, Duke Frederick.

===== Saxe-Jena =====
- John Ernest II, Duke of Saxe-Weimar (1678–1683), during the minority of his nephew, Duke Johann Wilhelm.
- John George I, Duke of Saxe-Eisenach (1683–1686), during the minority of his nephew, Duke Johann Wilhelm.
- William Ernest, Duke of Saxe-Weimar (1686–1690), during the minority of his cousin and brother-in-law, Duke Johann Wilhelm.

===== Saxe-Meiningen =====
- Charlotte Amalie of Hesse-Philippsthal (1763–1779), during the minority of her son, Duke Karl Wilhelm.
- Luise Eleonore of Hohenlohe (1803–1821), during the minority of her son, Duke Bernard II.

===== Saxe-Merseburg =====
- Erdmuthe Dorothea of Saxe-Zeitz (1694–1712), during the minorities of her sons, Duke Christian III Maurice and Duke Maurice Wilhelm.

===== Saxe-Weimar =====
- Augustus, Elector of Saxony (1573–1586), during the minority of his cousin, Duke Friedrich Wilhelm I.
- Francis Josias, Duke of Saxe-Coburg-Saalfeld and Frederick III, Duke of Saxe-Gotha-Altenburg (1748–1755), during the minority of their cousin, Duke Ernest Augustus II.
- Anna Amalia of Brunswick (1758–1775), during the minority of her son, Duke Carl August.

===== Saxony =====
- Gertrude of Süpplingenburg (1139–1142), during the minority of her son, Henry the Lion.
- Sophie of Brandenburg (1591–1601), during the minority of her son, Elector Christian II.
- Maria Antonia of Bavaria (1763–1769), during the minority of her son, Elector Frederick Augustus III.

===== Waldeck =====
- Emma of Anhalt-Bernburg-Schaumburg-Hoym (1845–1852), during the minority of her son, Prince George Victor.

==== Hungary ====
- Helena and Beloš Vukanović, in 1141–1146 during the rule of infant Géza II. Helena was the mother and Beloš her brother.
- Andrew of Hungary, between 1204 and 1205 during the rule of the infant Ladislaus III
- Elizabeth of Bosnia, regent for her daughter Mary between 1382–1385 and in 1386. Had assassinated her daughter's opponent Charles II, but was murdered herself the following year.
- John Hunyadi, during Ladislaus V's minority
- Michael Szilágyi in 1458, between Ladislaus V's death and the crowning of Matthias I
- George Martinuzzi (1540–1551) and Isabella Jagiellon (1556–1559) for John II
- Lajos Kossuth, under the Hungarian Revolution of 1848
- Joseph August, briefly after the fall of the Hungarian Soviet Republic in 1919. He is the last Habsburg to be a head of state.
- Admiral Miklós Horthy during the period of Kingdom of Hungary (1920–1944)

==== Iceland ====
- Hermann Jónasson, Stefán Jóhann Stefánsson, Eysteinn Jónsson, Jakob Ragnar Valdimar Möller, Ólafur Thors during Denmark's occupation between 1940 and 1941.
- Sveinn Björnsson was regent for King Christian X during Denmark's occupation between 1941 and 1944.

==== Italy ====
- Prince Umberto, Prince of Piedmont was regent for his father, King Vittorio Emanuele III, between 1944 and 1946 (whom he briefly succeeded as King Umberto II)

===== Mantua =====
- Isabella d'Este (1519–1521), during the minority of her son Federico II.

===== Parma =====
- Margherita de' Medici (1646–1648), during the minority of her son Ranuccio II
- Dorothea Sophie of Neuburg (1731) during the absence of her grandson Charles I
- Louise d'Artois (1854–1859), during the minority of her son Robert I.

===== Savoy =====
- Christine Marie of France (1637–1663), during the minority of her son Charles Emmanuel II.
- Marie Jeanne of Savoy (1675–1680), during the minority of her son Victor Amadeus II.

==== Kievan Rus' ====
- Oleg the Wise, ruled Novgorod and Kiev, for supposed kinsman Igor of Kiev (879–912)
- Olga of Kiev for her son Sviatoslav (945–969)

==== Portugal ====
- Countess Teresa, during the minority of her son Afonso I (1112–1139). Styled herself Queen of Portugal.
- Afonso, Count jure uxoris of Boulogne-sur-Mer, after Pope Innocent IV had deposed his brother Sancho II, and before assuming himself the throne as Afonso III, following Sancho's death (1245–1248). Styled himself Regent and Defender of the Kingdom.
- Queen Leonor, for her daughter Beatrice I (1383).
- João, Mestre de Avis, during the Dynastic Crisis, and before assuming himself the throne as John I (1384–1385). Styled himself Regent and Defender of the Kingdom.
- Queen Eleanor, during the minority of her son Afonso V (1438–1439).
- Peter, Duke of Coimbra, during the minority of his nephew Afonso V (1439–1448).
- Queen Catharine, during the minority of her grandson Sebastian I (1557–1562).
- Cardinal Prince Henry, during the minority of his grandnephew Sebastian I (1562–1568).
- Queen Luísa, for her son Afonso VI (1656–1662).
- Prince Peter, for his brother Afonso VI, and before assuming himself the throne as Peter II, following Afonso's death (1668–1683).
- Catherine, Queen Dowager of England, Scotland and Ireland, for her brother, Peter II, in 1701 and 1704–05.
- John, Prince Regent, during the incapacity of his mother Mary I, and before assuming himself the throne as John VI, following her death (1792–1816).
- Princess Isabel Maria, following her father's (John VI) death, and whilst awaiting the arrival of her brother Peter IV to assume the throne (1826–1828).
- Prince Michael, for his niece Mary II, and before usurping the throne for himself as Michael I (1828).
- Peter, Duke of Bragança (former King Peter IV), for his daughter Mary II (1831–1834).
- King jure uxoris Ferdinand II, during the minority of his son Peter V (1853–1855).

==== Romania ====
- Lascăr Catargiu, Gen. Nicolae Golescu, Col. Nicolae Haralambie (1866), between the overthrow of Alexandru Ioan Cuza and the coronation of Carol I as Prince.
- Prince Nicholas, Miron Cristea, Gheorghe Buzdugan (replaced upon his death by Constantin Sărăţeanu) (1927–1930), during the minority of king Michael I.

==== Russia ====
- Sophia of Lithuania for her son Vasily II (1425–1432)
- Elena Glinskaya for her son Ivan the Terrible (1533–1538) with her favorite Ivan Fedorovich (d. 1539)
- Sophia Alekseyevna for her brothers Ivan V and Peter the Great (1682–1689)
- Natalia Naryshkina for her son Peter the Great (1689–1694)
- Ernst Johann von Biron for the infant Ivan VI (1740)
- Anna Leopoldovna for her son Ivan VI (1740–1741)

==== Serbia ====
- Princess Milica, regent of Serbia during the minority of Stefan Lazarević (1389)
- Council of Regency during the Serbian Despotate: Mihailo Anđelović, Stefan Branković, and Helena Palaiologina (fl. 1458)
- Council of Regency during the minority of Prince Milan: Milivoje Petrović Blaznavac, Jovan Ristić and Jovan Gavrilović (1868–1872)
- Council of Regency during the minority of King Aleksandar Obrenović V: Jovan Ristić, Kosta Protić (d. 1892) and Jovan Belimarković (1889–1893)
- Crown Prince Alexander, regent of the Kingdom of Serbia (1914–1918) and regent of the Kingdom of Serbs, Croats and Slovenes (1918–1921), until the death of his father King Peter I

===== Serbian regents abroad =====
- Helena and Beloš Vukanović, Co-regents of Hungary (1141–1146)

==== Yugoslavia ====
- Crown Prince Alexander, regent of the Kingdom of Serbia (1914–1918) and regent of the Kingdom of Serbs, Croats and Slovenes (1918–1921), until the death of his father King Peter I
- Council of Regency during the minority of King Peter II: Prince Paul, Radenko Stanković, Ivo Perović (1934–1941)

=== Oceania ===
==== Hawaii ====
- Queen Kaʻahumanu, between 1824 and 1832 during the rule of the infant Kamehameha III; she was also Kuhina Nui (co-ruler), regent, of Kamehameha II
- Elizabeth Kīnaʻu, between 5 June 1832 – 17 March 1833 after Kaʻahumanu's death and before Kamehameha III became 20 years old
