= Ernest Gottlieb, Prince of Anhalt-Plötzkau =

German prince (1620-1654)

Ernest Gottlieb of Anhalt-Plötzkau (4 September 1620 – 7 March 1654) was a German prince of the House of Ascania and ruler of the principality of Anhalt-Plötzkau.

He was the eldest son of Augustus, Prince of Anhalt-Plötzkau, by his wife Sibylle, daughter of John George I, Count of Solms-Laubach.

== Life ==
Gottlieb was born and died in Plötzkau. In 1653, after the death of his father, Ernest Gottlieb inherited Plötzkau along with his younger brothers Lebrecht and Emmanuel; but because they succeeded his father in the regency over Anhalt-Köthen on behalf of their cousin William Louis, Ernest Gottlieb took complete control over the government of their principality.

His reign lasted only seven months until his death. Because he never married or had children, he was succeeded by his brothers and co-rulers.

Preceded by Augustus	Prince of Anhalt-Plötzkau with Lebrecht and Emmanuel; 1653–1654	Succeeded by Lebrecht and Emmanuel
