= Nguyễn Thị Ngọc Diễm =

- Born: 29 March 1721; Linh Đường village, Linh Đàm commune, Thanh Trì district, Phụng Thiên prefect, Vietnam
- Died: 12 September 1784 (aged 63); Đông Kinh, Vietnam
- Spouse: Trịnh Doanh
- Children: Trịnh Sâm

Nguyễn Thị Ngọc Diễm (‹The template Chuhan is being considered for deletion.› chữ Hán: 阮氏玉琰, 1721–1784), posthumous name Từ Trạch (慈澤), was a consort of lord Trịnh Doanh.

== Biography ==
Lady Nguyễn Thị Ngọc Diễm was born in 1721 at Linh Đường village, Linh Đàm commune, Thanh Trì district, Southern of Phụng Thiên prefect. She was commended to Trịnh clan's palace by her father who was Duke Nguyễn Văn Luân (阮文倫, 1686–1739). She became a concubine of prince Trịnh Doanh and was granted the title Hoa Dung (花容).
