= Principality of Anhalt-Plötzkau =

Principality in the Holy Roman Empire

Principality of Anhalt-Plötzkau Fürstentum Anhalt-Plötzkau
- 1544–1553; 1603–1665
- Coat of arms

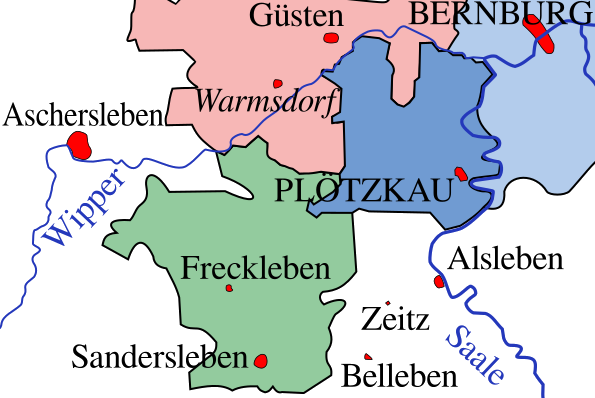
- The Principality of Anhalt-Plötzkau (blue) in 1611.
- Status: Principality
- Capital: Plötzkau
- Historical era: Middle Ages
  - Partitioned from Anhalt-Dessau: 1544 1544
  - Inherited by Anhalt-Zerbst: 1553
  - Partitioned from Anhalt-Zerbst: 1603
  - Inherited Anhalt-Zerbst: 1665
  - Duchy of Anhalt reunited: 1863
Preceded by	Succeeded by
Anhalt-Dessau	Principality of Anhalt-Zerbst

Anhalt-Plötzkau was a principality located in Germany. It existed on two occasions. It was first established in 1544 following the partition of Anhalt-Dessau, but the principality ceased to exist following the death of Prince George III in 1553, at which point it was inherited by the prince of Anhalt-Zerbst.

It was reestablished in 1603 with the partition of the unified principality of Anhalt; this time, in order to create a bigger principality, parts of Anhalt-Bernburg were extracted. This second incarnation lasted until 1665, at which point Prince Lebrecht succeeded as Prince of Anhalt-Köthen and Plötzkau returned to the principality of Anhalt-Bernburg.

== Princes of Anhalt-Plötzkau (1544-1553) ==
- George III 1544–1553

To Anhalt-Zerbst 1553.

== Princes of Anhalt-Plötzkau (1603-1665) ==
- Augustus 1603–1653
- Ernest Gottlieb 1653–1654
- Lebrecht 1653–1665 (co-regent)
- Emmanuel 1653–1665 (co-regent)

United with Anhalt-Bernburg 1665.
