= Trịnh Bồng =

Trịnh Bồng 鄭槰
- Trịnh lords Lord of Tonkin
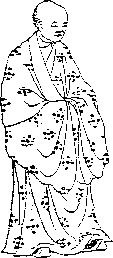

Trịnh Lords
- Reign: September 1786 – September 1787
- Predecessor: Trịnh Khải
- Successor: Military commander abolished
- Born: 25 August 1749
- Died: 13 February 1791 (aged 41); Laos
- Spouse: Nguyễn Thị Ngọc Viên; Phùng Thị Ngọc Diên
- Issue: Trịnh Vực; Trịnh Kiêm; Trịnh Tiệp; Trịnh Tư
Names
- Trịnh Bồng (鄭槰)
Regnal name
- Án Đô Vương (晏都王)
- House: Trịnh Lords
- Father: Trịnh Giang
- Religion: Buddhism

Án Đô Vương Trịnh Bồng (鄭槰 (25 August 1749 – 13 February 1791); reigned 1786–1787) was the last of the Trịnh lords. He succeeded Trịnh Khải, before southern Tây Sơn rebel leader and future emperor Nguyễn Huệ's 1788 final defeat of the northern Trịnh remnants.

== Background ==
Trịnh Bồng is the son of Uy Nam Vương Trịnh Giang, born in 1740. His cousin was Tĩnh Đô Vương Trịnh Sâm and he was the uncle of Đoan Nam Vương Trịnh Khải. When Trịnh Sâm and his father took power, he was granted the title of Côn Quận Công (琨郡公).

Vietnamese royalty
Preceded by Trịnh Khải	Trịnh lords Lord of Tonkin; 1786–1787	overthrown by Tây Sơn dynasty; Military commander abolished
