= Đặng Thị Huệ =

- Consort of lord Trịnh Sâm
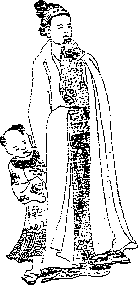
- Portrait of Đặng Thị Huệ và the future lord Trịnh Cán
- Born: ? Bắc Ninh Province
- Died: 1784
- Spouse: Trịnh Sâm
- Issue: Trịnh Cán
- Dynasty: Trịnh Lords
- Religion: Buddhism

Đặng Thị Huệ (died 1784), was the favorite consort of Trịnh Sâm. She acted as a regent for one month after Trịnh Sâm died in 1782. According to histories she used to pick tea-leaves, but gained favour with Trịnh Sâm and was made senior concubine with the title Tuyên phi or Consort Tuyên, the highest rank of the Lord's wife.

== Life ==
She is depicted by subsequent history as having used her influence, although in contrast a stele in Temple of Literature, Hanoi records the rector of the college refusing to pass her younger brother in Vietnam's Confucian exams.

As favourite concubine, she tried make her son Trịnh Cán heir. However, Trịnh Khải organized an army and fought against his half-brother and destroyed all her supporters. She was forced to commit suicide. Her birth and death day are unknown.

In 1782, Trịnh Sâm died after he had reigned for 15 years. His second son, Trịnh Cán, who was just 6 years old, succeeded the throne, the Royal Title is Điện Đô Vương, his mother is Consort Tuyên Đặng Thị Huệ became the one who control all the state affairs. In October 1782, Dự Vũ, assistant of the coup leader Trịnh Khải, killed Hoàng Đình Bảo. He then forced Trịnh Cán to abdicate.

She is the subject of the 2010 historical novel Tuyên phi Đặng Thị Huệ by Văn Phú Ngô.

== Modern depiction ==
- Portrayed by Lê Vân in the 1989 movie Đêm hội Long Trì.
