= Augustus, Prince of Anhalt-Plötzkau =

German prince

Augustus of Anhalt-Plötzkau (Dessau, 14 July 1575 – Plötzkau, 22 August 1653), was a German prince of the House of Ascania and ruler of the unified principality of Anhalt. From 1603, he was ruler of the principality of Anhalt-Plötzkau.

Augustus was the fourth son of Joachim Ernest, Prince of Anhalt, but second-born son of his second wife Eleonore, daughter of Christoph, Duke of Württemberg.

== Life ==
In 1586, after the death of his father, Augustus inherited Anhalt jointly with his half- and full brothers under the regency of the eldest, John George I.

After seventeen years of joint rule, the surviving brothers agreed to a formal division of their lands in 1603. Augustus received Plötzkau, which was created from parts of the old principality of Anhalt-Bernburg.

In 1611 he proposed publishing the two Rosicrucian manifestos together, but was unable to locate a copy of Confessio.

From 1621 until 1642, Augustus acted as regent in Anhalt-Zerbst for his infant nephew John VI, and from 1650 until 1653 in Anhalt-Köthen for another infant nephew, William Louis.

== Marriage and issue ==
In Ansbach on 25 January 1618 Augustus married Sibylle (b. Laubach, 19 October 1590 - d. Plötzkau, 23 March 1659), daughter of John George I, Count of Solms-Laubach. They had eight children:

1. Johanna (b. Plötzkau, 24 November 1618 - d. Quedlinburg, 3 May 1676).
2. Ernest Gottlieb, Prince of Anhalt-Plötzkau (b. Plötzkau, 4 September 1620 - d. Plötzkau, 7 March 1654).
3. Lebrecht, Prince of Anhalt-Plötzkau, later Anhalt-Köthen (b. Plötzkau, 8 April 1622 - d. Köthen, 7 November 1669).
4. Dorothea (b. Zerbst, 20 June 1623 - d. Plötzkau, 6 December 1637).
5. Ehrenpreis (b. Zerbst, 21 July 1625 - d. Bernburg, 21 July 1626).
6. Sophie (b. Plötzkau, 11 July 1627 - d. Köthen, 24 November 1679).
7. Elisabeth (b. Plötzkau, 21 March 1630 - d. Köthen, 17 April 1692).
8. Emmanuel, Prince of Anhalt-Plötzkau, later Anhalt-Köthen (b. Plötzkau, 6 October 1631 - d. Köthen, 8 November 1670).

| Preceded by Joachim Ernest | Prince of Anhalt with John George I, Christian I, Bernhard (until 1596), Rudolph, John Ernest (until 1601) and Louis; 1586–1603 | Succeeded by Principality partitioned into Anhalt-Dessau, Anhalt-Bernburg, Anhalt-Plötzkau, Anhalt-Zerbst and Anhalt-Köthen |
| Preceded by Principality (re-)created | Prince of Anhalt-Plötzkau; 1603–1653 | Succeeded by Ernest Gottlieb; Lebrecht; Emmanuel |
