= Emmanuel, Prince of Anhalt-Köthen =

Emmanuel
- Prince of Anhalt-Köthen
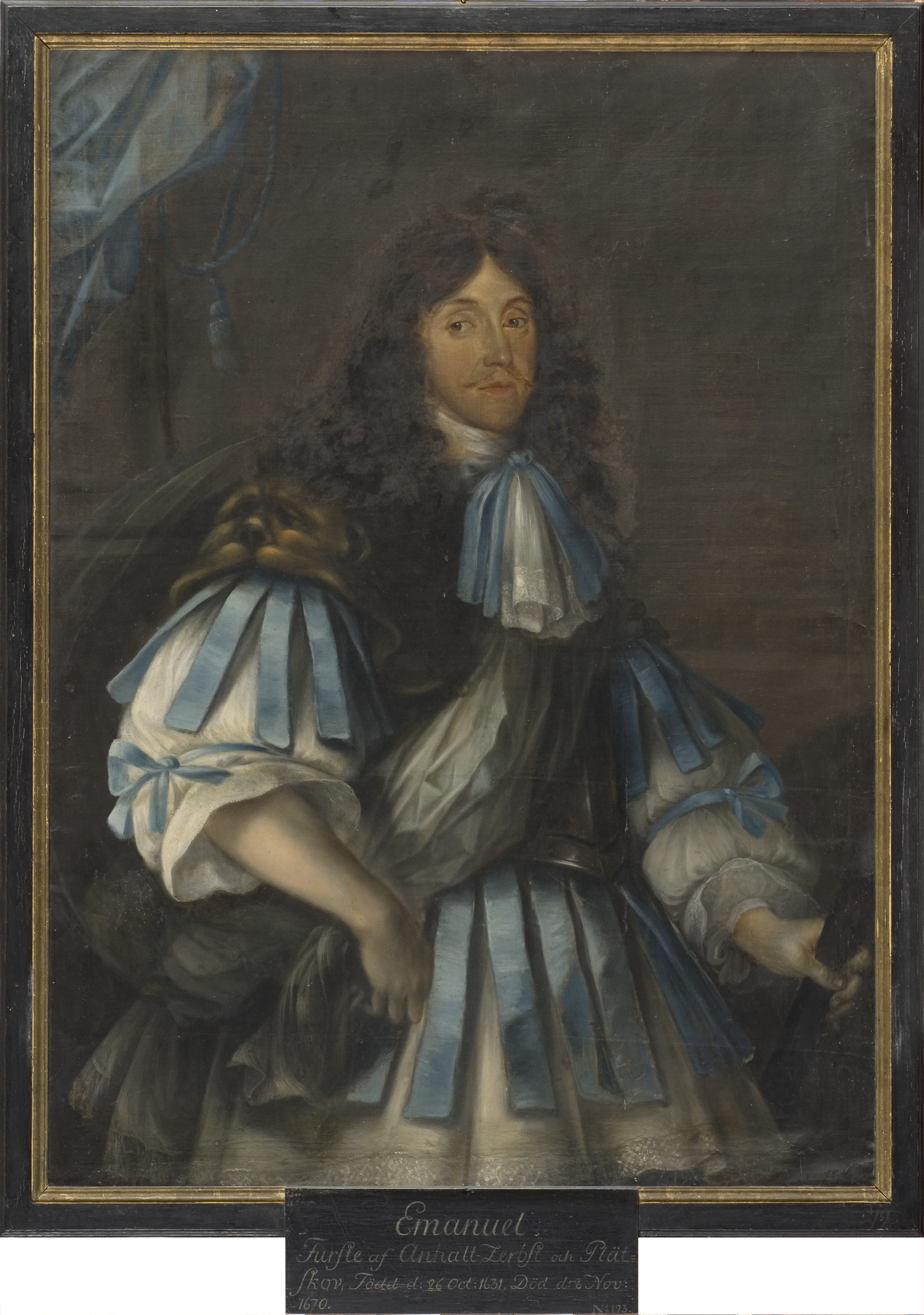
- Portrait at Gripsholm Castle, 17th century
- Born: 6 October 1631
- Died: 8 November 1670 (aged 39)
- Spouse: Anna Eleonore of Stolberg-Wernigerode
- Issue: Emmanuel Lebrecht, Prince of Anhalt-Köthen
- House: Ascania
- Father: Augustus, Prince of Anhalt-Plötzkau
- Mother: Sibylle of Solms-Laubach

Emmanuel of Anhalt-Köthen (6 October 1631, in Plötzkau – 8 November 1670, in Köthen), was a German prince of the House of Ascania and ruler of the principality of Anhalt-Plötzkau. From 1665, he was ruler of the principality of Anhalt-Köthen.

He was the third and youngest son of Augustus, Prince of Anhalt-Plötzkau, by his wife Sibylle, daughter of John George I, Count of Solms-Laubach.

== Life ==
In 1653, after the death of his father, Emmanuel inherited Plötzkau jointly with his older brothers Ernest Gottlieb and Lebrecht. They also had the responsibility of acting as regents over Anhalt-Köthen on behalf of the infant Prince William Louis. In practice, it was Emmanuel and Lebrecht who exercised the regency while Ernest Gottlieb remained as sole ruler of Plötzkau for only seven months until his own death, after which Emmanuel and Lebrecht served as co-rulers. Their regency over Köthen lasted until 1659, when William Louis was proclaimed of age and began his own government over the principality.

The death of William Louis in 1665 without heirs changed the distribution of the existing Anhalt principalities: Emmanuel and Lebrecht received Köthen, and their former principality of Plötzkau was returned to Anhalt-Bernburg, from which it was originally extracted.

The death of Lebrecht without heirs in 1669 left Emmanuel as sole ruler of Anhalt-Köthen until his death, almost exactly one year later.

== Marriage and issue ==
In Ilsenburg on 23 March 1670 Emmanuel married Anna Eleonore (b. Ilsenburg, 26 March 1651 - d. Köthen, 27 January 1690), daughter of Henry Ernest, Count of Stolberg-Wernigerode and niece of Sophie Ursula, the widow of his brother Lebrecht.

On Emmanuel's death, his wife was three months pregnant. She was declared regent over Köthen until the birth of the child; if she had a boy, he could succeed his father, but if the child was a girl, the other principalities would divide the Köthen lands.

On 20 May 1671, six months after the death of her husband, the Dowager Princess Anna Eleonore gave birth to a son, named Emmanuel Lebrecht, who immediately became the new ruler of Anhalt-Köthen under the regency of his mother.

Preceded by Augustus	Prince of Anhalt-Plötzkau with Ernest Gottlieb (until 1654) and Lebrecht; 1653–1665	Succeeded by Principality merged with Anhalt-Bernburg under Victor Amadeus
Preceded by William Louis	Prince of Anhalt-Köthen with Lebrecht until 1669; 1665–1670	Succeeded by Emmanuel Lebrecht
