= Lebrecht, Prince of Anhalt-Köthen =

German prince (1622-1669)

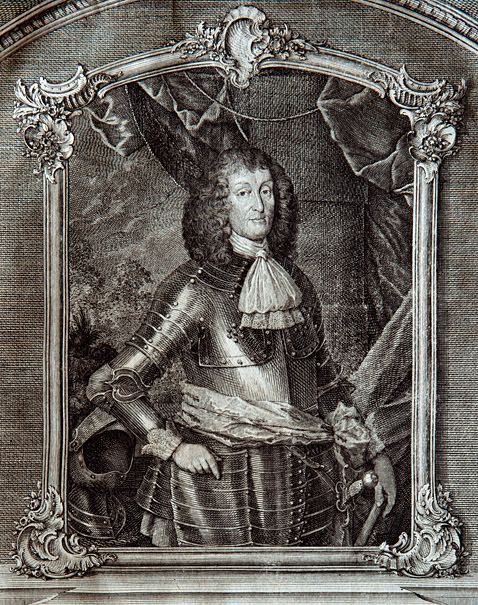
Leberecht von Anhalt-Köthen (1622–1669)

Lebrecht of Anhalt-Köthen (Plötzkau, 8 April 1622 – Köthen, 7 November 1669), was a German prince of the House of Ascania and ruler of the principality of Anhalt-Plötzkau. From 1665, he was ruler of the principality of Anhalt-Köthen.

He was the second son of Augustus, Prince of Anhalt-Plötzkau, by his wife Sibylle, daughter of John George I, Count of Solms-Laubach.

== Life ==
After the death of his father in 1653, Lebrecht inherited Plötzkau jointly with his older brother Ernest Gottlieb and his younger brother Emmanuel. With their principality, they also received the regency over Anhalt-Köthen on behalf of the infant Prince William Louis. While Lebrecht and Emmanuel held the regency, Ernest Gottlieb served as sole ruler over Plötzkau, but only for seven months until his death, unmarried and childless.

Lebrecht continued as regent over Köthen until 1659, when William Louis was proclaimed of age and began to govern his principality. Lebrecht then returned to Plötzkau, where he ruled jointly with Emmanuel.

The death of William Louis in 1665 without heirs changed the distribution of the existing Anhalt principalities: Lebrecht and his brother received Anhalt-Köthen, and Plötzkau was returned to Anhalt-Bernburg, from which it was originally extracted.

In Plötzkau on 18 January 1655 Lebrecht married Sophie Ursula Eleonore (b. Ortenberg, 2 October 1628 - d. Köthen, 13 September 1675), daughter of Henry Volrad, Count of Stolberg-Wernigerode. The union was childless.

After four years of rule in Köthen, Lebrecht died without heirs and was succeeded by his younger brother and co-ruler Emmanuel.

Preceded by Augustus	Prince of Anhalt-Plötzkau with Ernest Gottlieb (until 1654) and Emmanuel; 1653–1665	Succeeded by Principality merged with Anhalt-Bernburg under Victor Amadeus
Preceded by William Louis	Prince of Anhalt-Köthen with Emmanuel; 1665–1669	Succeeded by Emmanuel
