= Henry Ernest =

Henry Ernest may refer to:

- Henry Ernest of Stolberg-Wernigerode (1716–1778), German politician and author
- Henry Ernest, Count of Stolberg (1593–1672), German nobleman
