= Trịnh Khải =

Trịnh Khải 鄭楷
- Trịnh lords Lord of Tonkin
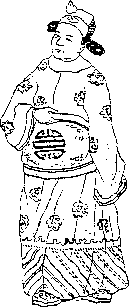

Trịnh Lords
- Reign: 1782–1786
- Predecessor: Trịnh Cán
- Successor: Trịnh Bồng
- Born: 10 October 1763; Đông Kinh, North Vietnam
- Died: 23 July 1786 (aged 22); Đông Kinh, North Vietnam
- Spouse: ?
Names
- Trịnh Tông (鄭棕); Trịnh Khải (鄭楷)
Regnal name
- Đoan Nam Vương (端南王)
- House: Trịnh Lords
- Father: Trịnh Sâm
- Mother: Dương Thị Ngọc Hoan
- Religion: Buddhism

Đoan Nam Vương Trịnh Khải (chữ Hán: 鄭楷, 10 October 1763 – 23 July 1786) was one of the Trịnh lords in northern Vietnam. He fought against the armies of the infant Trịnh Cán to win leadership of the northern warlords (reigning 29 November 1782 – July 1786), but was himself defeated by the Tây Sơn rebel leader, later emperor Nguyễn Huệ. Trịnh Khải later committed suicide while were arrested by the Tây Sơn troops. He was succeeded by the last of the lords, Trịnh Bồng.

Vietnamese royalty
Preceded by Trịnh Cán	Trịnh lords Lord of Tonkin; 1782–1786	Succeeded by Trịnh Bồng
