= Linh Đàm =

Linh Đàm Linh Đàm
- Neighborhood and Planning Area (khu đô thị mới)
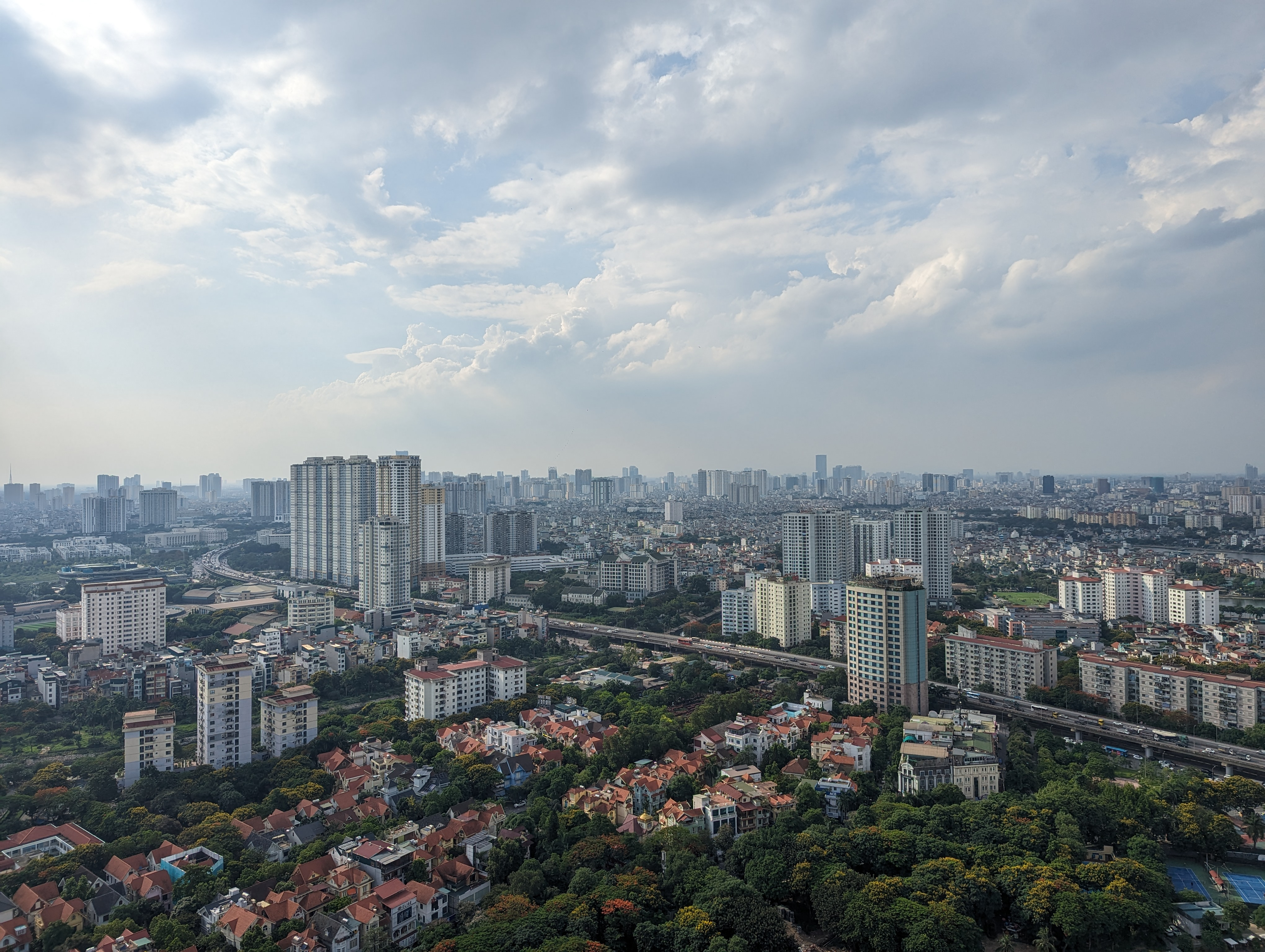
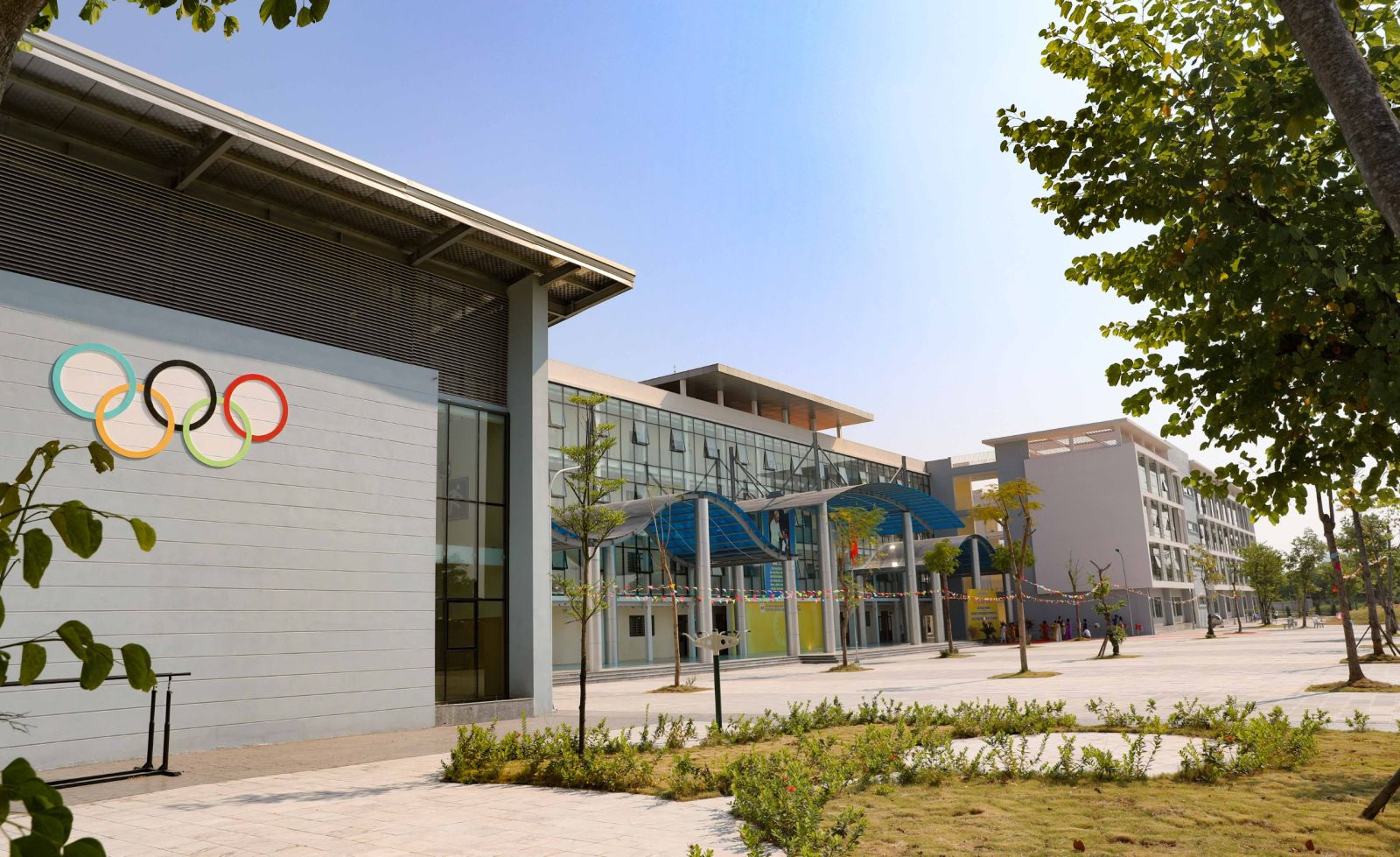
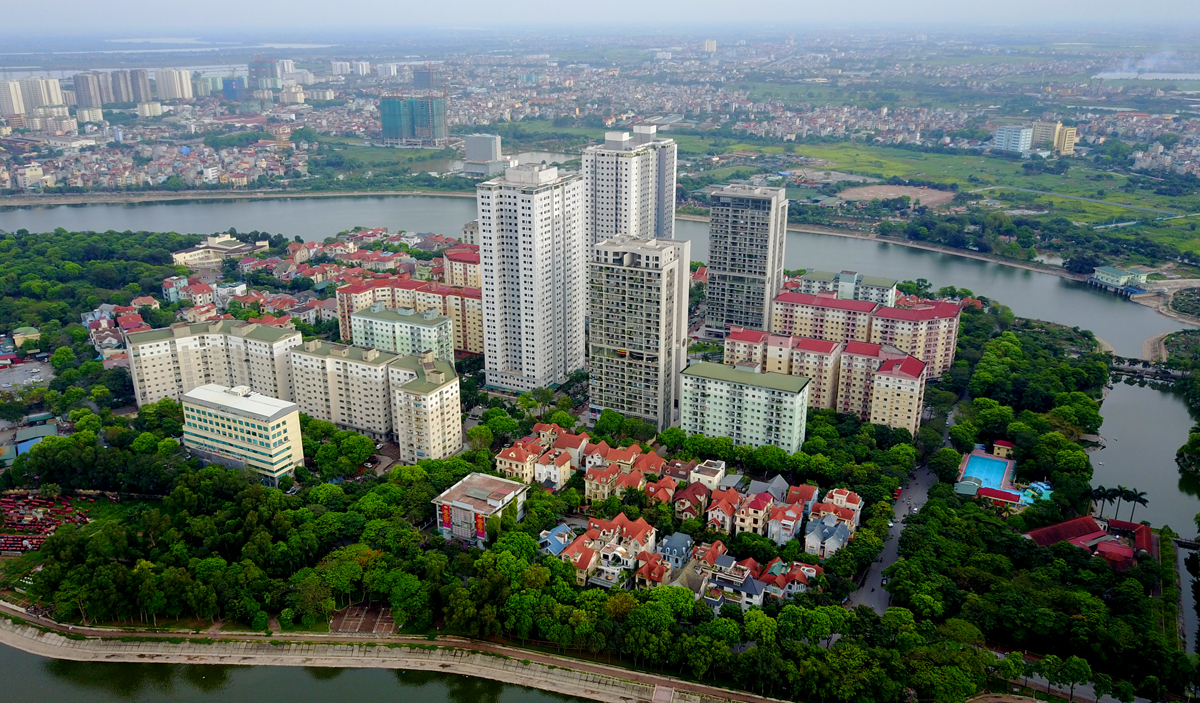
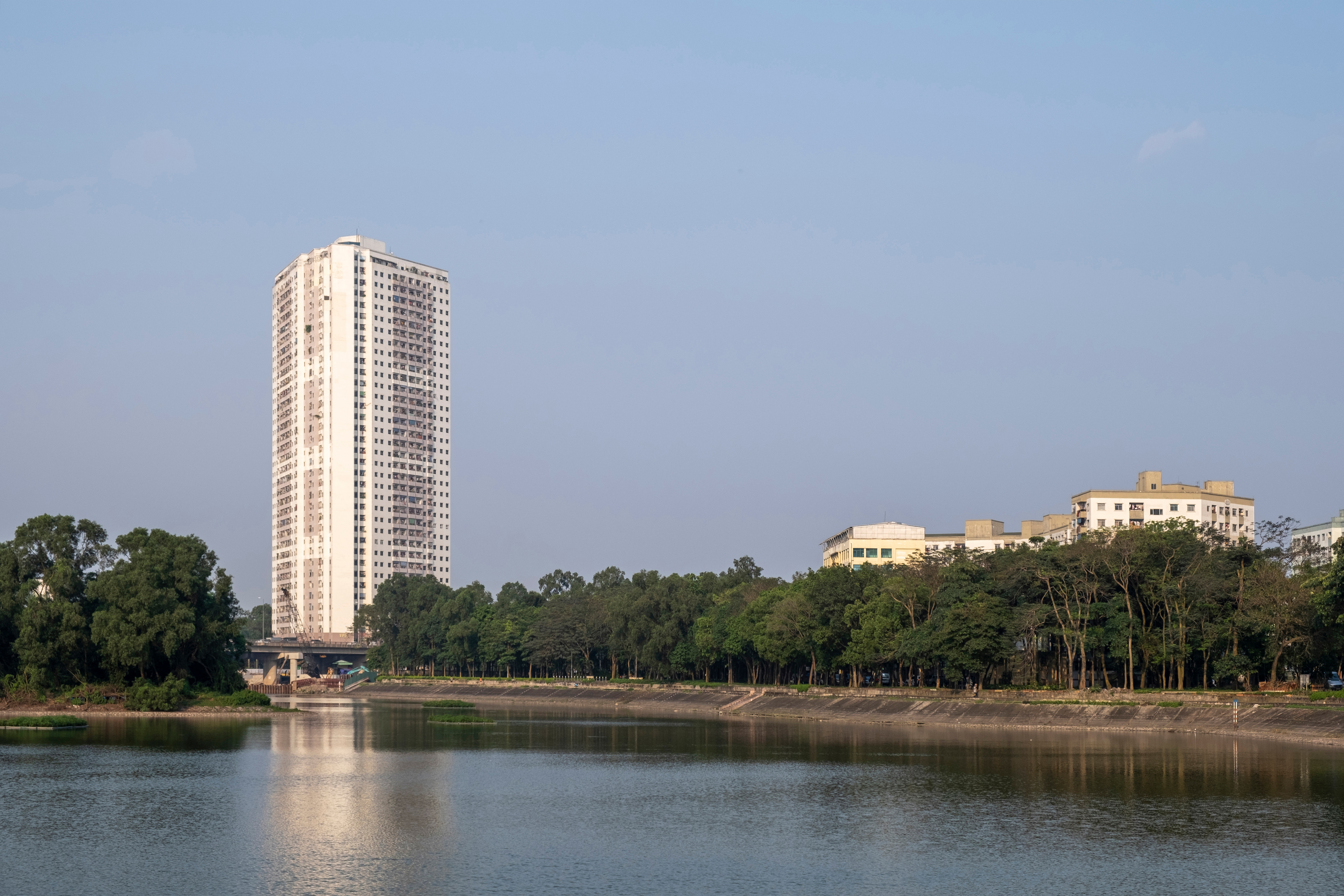
- Clockwise from top left: Panoramic view of Linh Đàm, Linh Đàm Peninsula, Linh Đàm Lake, Hoàng Mai District Sports and Cultural Center

- Location within Hanoi Location within Vietnam
- Coordinates: 20°58′03″N 105°50′11″E
- Country: Vietnam
- Municipality: Hanoi
- District: Hoàng Mai
- Ward: Hoàng Liệt, Đại Kim

Area
  - Total: 1.84 km^{2} (0.71 sq mi)
  - Water: 0.74 km^{2} (0.29 sq mi)

Population (2023)
  - Estimate: 70,000
- Postal code: 11718, 11719, 11757

Linh Đàm is a neighborhood located in Hoàng Mai district, Hanoi. With a population of about 80,000 people, Linh Đàm is among the most densely populated neighborhoods in Vietnam. First settled in around the early 1600s, the area was mostly a swamp and sparsely populated area until the early 1990s, when it was planned to relieve overpopulation in the urban core of Hanoi. The neighborhood is characterized by tall buildings and the Linh Đàm lake serving the community.

== History ==
=== Early history ===
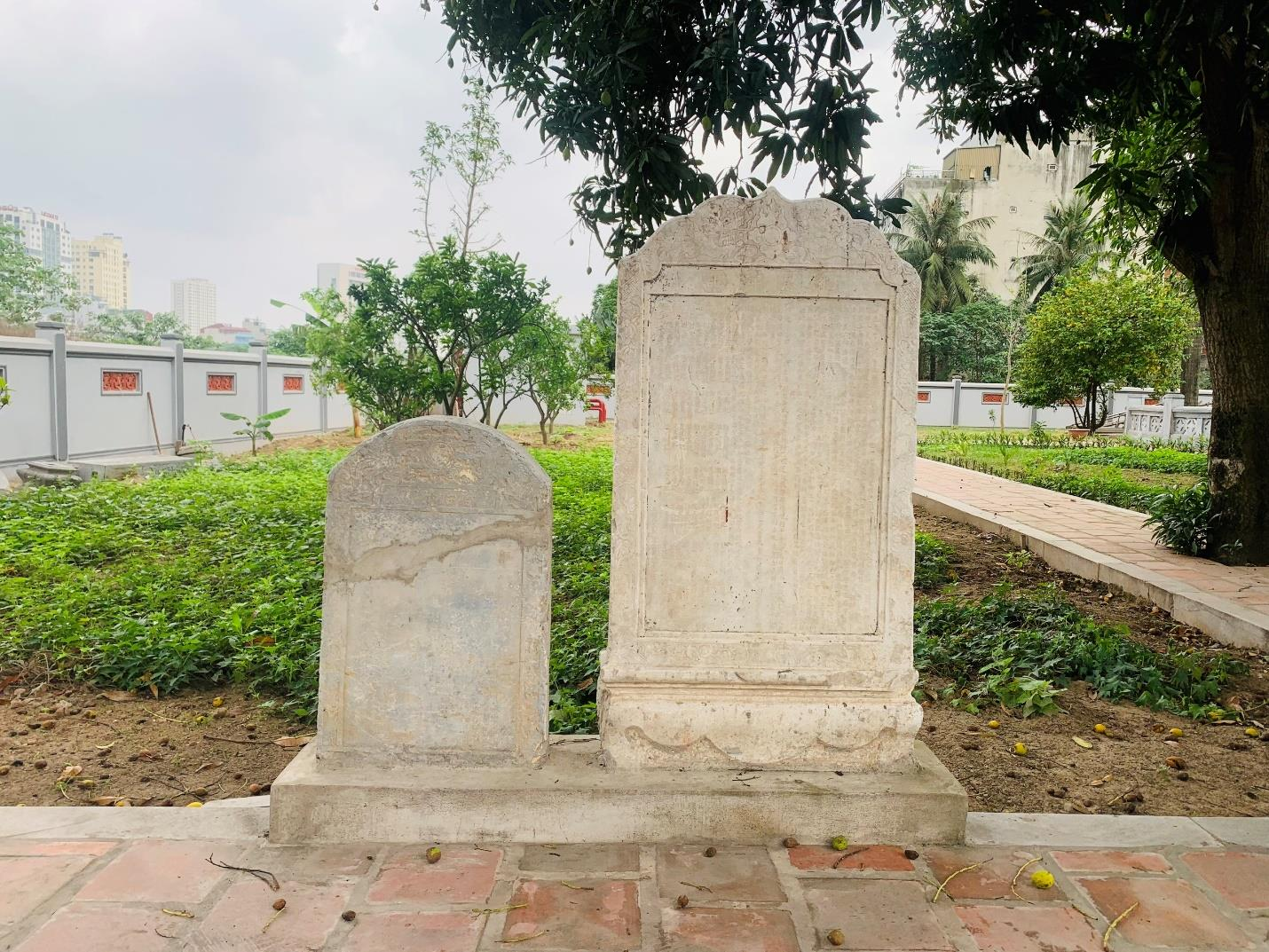
A memorial stele honors the contribution of wealthy locals who helped contributed to the construction of Linh Đàm communal house, erected in December 1698.

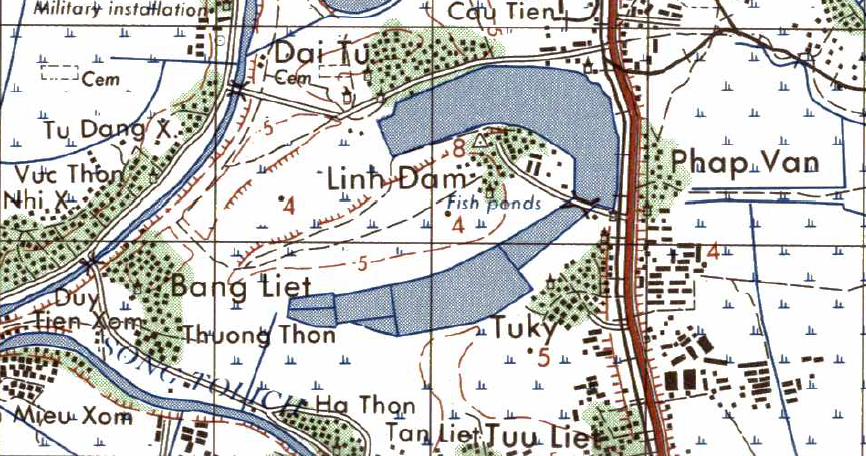
Linh Đàm in 1983, showing the area was mostly rice field and uninhabited.

Some of the earliest record of permanent settlement in this area show that what was now Linh Đàm was first inhabited in the early 1600s, when the Linh Đàm pagoda was built. The first mention of the name "Linh Đàm" on official maps was in 1882, when the Đại Nam nhất thống chí (Đại Nam Comprehensive Encyclopaedia) was published, showing the area as "Đàm Linh Đường", later simply became "Linh Đàm". The villages surrounding this area was once known for producing fine rice products, such as rice vermicelli.

The origin of the name "Linh Đàm" can be traced back to a 14th-century folk legend. According to the tale, the present-day area of Linh Đàm and its neighboring community, Thanh Liệt, once served as the residence of Chu Văn An, a highly esteemed teacher and mandarin during the Trần dynasty. Renowned for his uprightness, Chu Văn An instructed numerous influential officials of the Trần dynasty. Legend has it that one of his students possessed the extraordinary ability to summon rain and was sent by the Jade Emperor to pursue studies in this region. When called upon to bring rain and alleviate a drought-stricken village, the student agreed but faced severe consequences—ultimately meeting his demise at the hands of the Jade Emperor. In commemoration of the student's sacrificial act, Chu Văn An and the villagers erected a shrine named "Long Đàm." Over time, the appellation transformed into "Lân đàm" and eventually evolved into the contemporary name "Linh Đàm."

In 1698, the Linh Đàm communal house (đình làng Linh Đàm) was completed, marking an important milestone, as in Vietnamese culture, a settlement was only considered a "proper" village when it had a communal house. The communal house was built with significant contribution from a wealthy local who contributed 800 taels of silver and 5 acre of farmland.

By the 1960s, during the Vietnam War, Linh Đàm and the surrounding area were used as a military warehouse for the PAVN. As a result, during the Linebacker II operation, Linh Đàm and nearby area were frequently targeted by B-52 bombers.

=== Early developments (late 1990s to late 2000s) ===
After economic reforms in the late 1980s, commonly known as Đổi mới, Hanoi's population began to steadily rise, from 2 million in 1990 to around 2.6 million people in 1999, averaging 3.05% population increase between 1990 and 1995. To combat the problem, the National Government issued several master plans for Hanoi in 1992 and 1998, which called for the development of new planning areas (khu đô thị mới) to reduce overcrowding in central Hanoi. A new state-run enterprise, called HUD (Housing and Urban Development Company, Tổng công ty Đầu tư Phát triển nhà và đô thị) was established under the Ministry of Construction to build these new planned areas, including Linh Đàm.

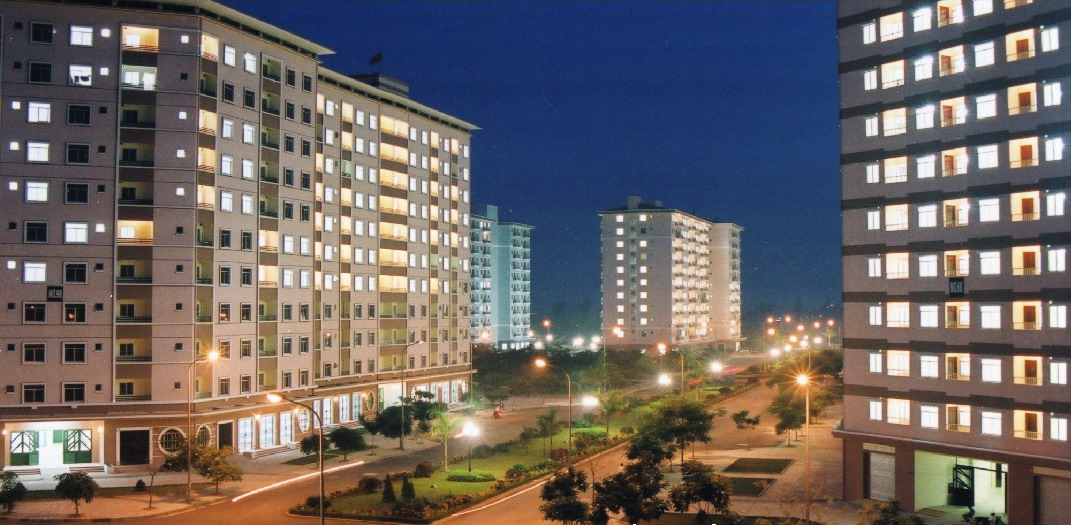
Residential buildings in Linh Đàm Peninsula, shortly after its completion in summer 2002.

In June 1994, the area around Linh Đàm lake was selected to be one of the first new planning area of Vietnam, (Note: The area of Linh Đàm was selected by the Prime Minister in Decision 304/TTg, signed on June 8, 1994, and Decision 992/QĐ - UB on May 25, 1995, by the People's Committee of Hanoi. Both of these documents was cited in the final planning of Linh Đàm in 2000, but both were not available on the National Database of Official Documents.) alongside Phú Mỹ Hưng in Ho Chi Minh City. Construction of the first stage started in 1997 under the name Khu nhà ở Bắc Linh Đàm (North Linh Đàm Residential Area) and finished in 2002 by the newly-formed HUD. The first stage covers an area of 200ha, and was planned for 25,000 people. According to HUD, Linh Đàm is the first residential area in Vietnam to featured high-rise building (above 9 stories), elevators, and dedicated management board (ban quản trị). When completed, the first stage consisted of 3 9-stories apartment buildings, alongside the Linh Đàm park, which featured a tennis court, swimming pool, and mix-used residential building.

After the first stage, the government approved second and third stages of Linh Đàm in 2000, known as Khu đô thị Linh Đàm mở rộng (Extended Linh Đàm); and Bán đảo Linh Đàm (Linh Đàm peninsula), respectively. Together, these area was planned for a population of around 19,100 people, covering 176 ha (including the 160ha Linh Đàm lake). Construction began in 2000 and was mostly completed by 2005.

In 2009, Linh Đàm was awarded the title of "model urban area" (khu đô thị kiểu mẫu) by the Ministry of Construction.

=== Expansion (2010s) ===
As the population of Hanoi continued to grow in the early 2010s, the increasing demand for housing projects led to a surge in urban development, especially on the outskirt area alongside the newly completed Ringway 3. The city approved a plan for a new expansion of Linh Đàm, called Khu đô thị Tây Nam Linh Đàm (Southwest Linh Đàm Residential Area), in 2006. Construction began in May 2010, the new area consisted of mixed residential high rises and low rises, similar to previous phases. In addition, Southwest Linh Đàm also features dedicated mix-used public housing buildings, the first of its kind in Vietnam. By 2016, Southwest Linh Đàm was mostly completed.

During the same time frame, the area which was initially reserved for mix-use residential and office area was approved by the city government to be developed into high-rise residential buildings. These buildings were later named HH Linh Đàm, and was constructed by Mường Thanh Hotel Group. This development was controversial at the time, as many planners considered the HH buildings as a reason for the downfall of Linh Đàm from a model urban area to an overcrowded new town, contributing to traffic jams, and overcrowding in nearby schools. Many blame a lack of oversight from the city as one of the main reasons, alongside rising demand, for failure to follow the masterplan.

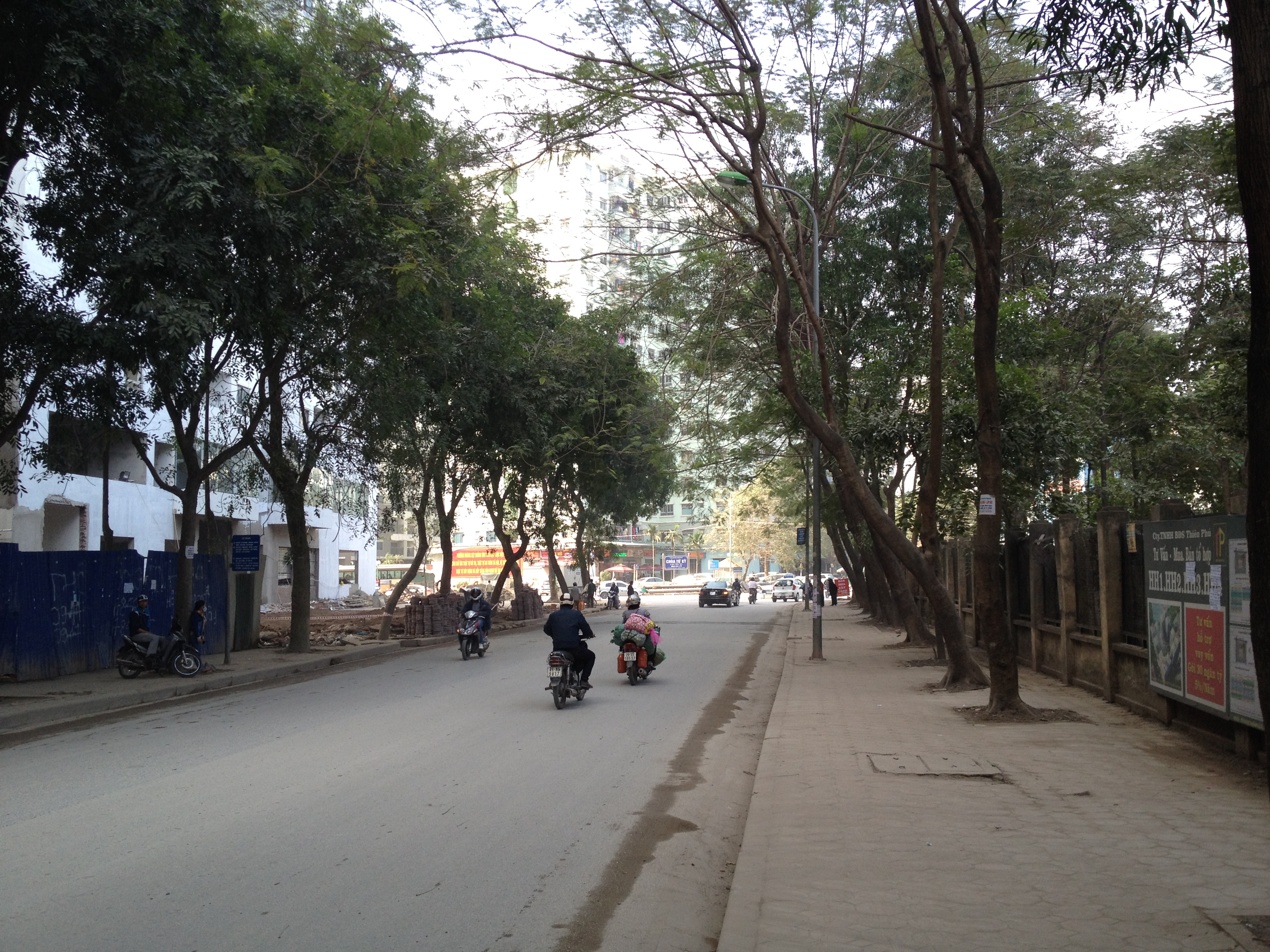
HH Linh Đàm buildings under construction.

== Sub-areas ==
Linh Đàm is divided into 5 main sections: North Linh Đàm, North Linh Đàm Extended, Southwest Linh Đàm, Linh Đàm Peninsula, and HH Linh Đàm.
