= Trịnh Doanh =

Trịnh Doanh 鄭楹
- Trịnh lords Lord of Tonkin
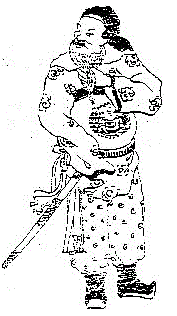

Trịnh lords
- Reign: 1740– 1767
- Predecessor: Trịnh Giang
- Successor: Trịnh Sâm
- Born: 4 December 1720
- Died: 15 February 1767 (aged 46)
- Spouse: ?
- Issue: Trịnh Sâm
Names
- Trịnh Doanh (鄭楹)
Regnal name
- Minh Đô Vương (明都王)
Posthumous name
- Ân Vương (恩王)
Temple name
- Nghị Tổ (毅祖)
- House: Trịnh lords
- Father: Trịnh Cương
- Mother: Vũ Thị Ngọc Nguyên
- Religion: Buddhism

Trịnh Doanh (4 December 1720 – 15 February 1767) ruled northern Vietnam (Tonkin) from 1740 to 1767 (he ruled with the title Minh Đô Vương). Trịnh Doanh was the third son of Trịnh Cương, and belonged to the line of Trịnh lords who ruled northern Vietnam. His rule was spent putting down rebellions against Trịnh rule.

- Trịnh Doanh
- Vietnamese alphabet: Trịnh Doanh
- Chữ Hán: 鄭楹

Trịnh Doanh took over from his brother, Trịnh Giang, who, through financial mismanagement and bad behavior, provoked a wave of revolts against his rule. This was a time of increasing peasant revolts in both the north and the south under the Nguyễn lords. In the north, some of the revolts were apparently led by members of the royal Lê family.

The rebellions which broke out in Tonkin during this period, were almost without number. Princes belonging to the royal family, generals, civil mandarins, common people, and out-casts from the hills, all rose in the provinces against the tyranny of the Trịnh, as well as for their personal interests. Chapter 16 (continued)

Despite the many revolts, Trịnh Doanh defeated them all and passed the rule of Vietnam to his son, Trịnh Sâm.

As far as the Lê dynasty was concerned, there was just one emperor, Lê Hien Tông (1740–1786), who occupied the royal throne in Hanoi.

== See also ==
- Lê dynasty

== Sources ==
- Encyclopedia of Asian History, Volumes 4. 1988. Charles Scribner's Sons, New York.
- Annam and its Minor Currency Chapter 16 (downloaded May 2006)

Vietnamese royalty
Preceded by Trịnh Giang	Trịnh lords Lord of Tonkin; 1740-1767	Succeeded by Trịnh Sâm
