= Anna Eleonore of Stolberg-Wernigerode =

German noblewoman

Anna Eleonore
- Princess of Anhalt-Köthen
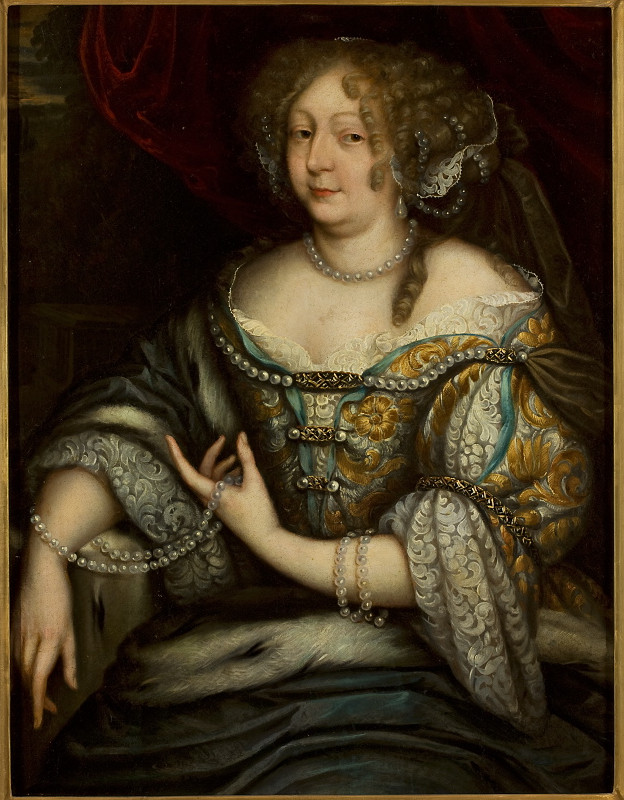
- Portrait, c. 1680–90
- Born: 26 March 1651; Ilsenburg
- Died: 27 January 1690 (aged 38); Köthen
- Buried: St. Jacob church in Köthen
- Noble family: Stolberg
- Spouse: Emmanuel, Prince of Anhalt-Köthen
- Father: Henry Ernest, Count of Stolberg-Wernigerode
- Mother: Anna Elisabeth of Stolberg

Anna Eleonore of Stolberg-Wernigerode (26 March 1651 - 27 January 1690), was a German regent; Princess of Anhalt-Köthen by marriage to Emmanuel, Prince of Anhalt-Köthen, and regent of Anhalt-Köthen during the minority of her son from 1671 until 1690.

== Life ==
Born in Ilsenburg, she was the second child of Henry Ernest, Count of Stolberg-Wernigerode and Anna Elisabeth of Stolberg.

In Ilsenburg on 23 March 1670, Anna Eleonore married Emmanuel, Prince of Anhalt-Köthen. The marriage lasted only eight months, until Emmanuel's death on 8 November.

=== Regency ===
Three months pregnant at the time of her husband's death, Anna Eleonore was named regent of the Principality of Anhalt-Köthen until the birth of her child: if it was a boy, he immediately became the new Prince and she kept the regency, but if she gave birth to a girl, the other Anhalt principalities would divided Köthen between them.

On 20 May 1671, Anna Eleonore gave birth a son, Emmanuel Lebrecht who became in the new Prince. Anna Eleonore remained a regent until her death.

Anna Eleonore died in Köthen aged 38. She was buried next to her husband at St. Jakob, Köthen. Because her son was still underage, John George II, Prince of Anhalt-Dessau succeeded her in the regency until 1692, when Emmanuel Lebrecht finally attained his majority and began his independent government.
