= Trịnh Cán =

Trịnh Cán 鄭檊
- Trịnh lords Lord of Tonkin
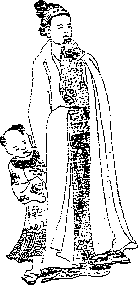

Trịnh Lords
- Reign: October–November 1782
- Predecessor: Trịnh Sâm
- Successor: Trịnh Khải
- Born: 1777
- Died: 17 December 1782 (aged 4-5); Đông Kinh, North Vietnam
Names
- Trịnh Cán (鄭檊)
Regnal name
- Điện Đô vương (奠都王)
- House: Trịnh Lords
- Father: Trịnh Sâm
- Mother: Đặng Thị Huệ

Điện Đô Vương Trịnh Cán (chữ Hán: 鄭檊, 1777 – 17 December 1782) was a child heir of northern Vietnam's Trịnh lords and the ninth Trịnh lord. His mother was Đặng Thị Huệ who undertook a war to retain his place as lord, but her armies were defeated by warlord Trịnh Khải. He was born and died in Thang Long (now Hanoi).

== History ==
Trịnh Cán was born in 1777; he was sickly at birth. He became prince in 1780 after his brother Trịnh Khải abdicated. In September 1782, Trịnh Sâm died. Đặng Thị Huệ and Count Hoàng Đình Bảo helped Trịnh Cán succeed the rank of lord with the title Điện Đô vương when he was just 4 or 5 years old. Queen Đặng Thị Huệ officially controlled the royal court to help her son and Count Hoàng Đình Bảo rule, which enraged the army and civilians.

In October 1782, Dự Vũ, assistant of the coup leader Trịnh Khải, killed Hoàng Đình Bảo. He then forced Trịnh Cán to abdicate. Trịnh Cán was forced to live in exile and died one month later.

Vietnamese royalty
Preceded by Trịnh Sâm	Trịnh lords Lord of Tonkin; 1782	Succeeded by Trịnh Khải
