= Trịnh Sâm =

Trịnh Sâm 鄭森
- Trịnh lords Lord of Tonkin
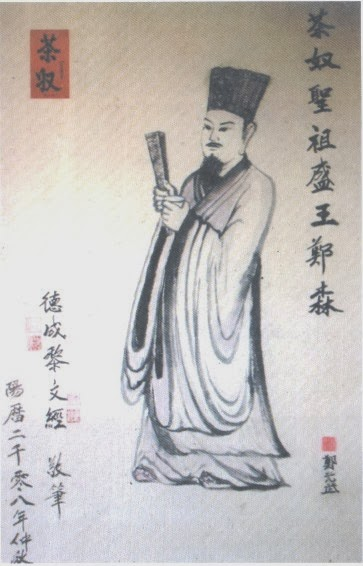

Trịnh lords
- Reign: 1767–1782
- Predecessor: Trịnh Doanh
- Successor: Trịnh Cán
- Born: 9 February 1739
- Died: September 13, 1782 (aged 43)
- Spouse: Dương Thị Ngọc Hoan; Trần Thị Lộc; Hoàng Thị Ngọc Khoan; Đặng Thị Huệ
- Issue: Prince Trịnh Khải; Prince Trịnh Cán; Princess Trịnh Thị Ngọc Anh; Princess Trịnh Thị Ngọc Lan
Names
- Trịnh Sâm (鄭森)
Regnal name
- Tĩnh Đô Vương (靖都王)
Posthumous name
- Thịnh Vương (盛王)
Temple name
- Thánh Tổ (聖祖)
- House: Trịnh lords
- Father: Trịnh Doanh
- Mother: Nguyễn Thị Ngọc Diễm
- Religion: Buddhism
- Seal

Trịnh Sâm (Vietnamese: 鄭森, 9 February 1739 – 13 September 1782) ruled northern Vietnam from 1767 to 1782 AD. He ruled with the title "Tĩnh Đô Vương" (Vietnamese: 靖都王, lit. 'Viceroy Tinh Do') and was one of the last of the powerful Trịnh lords. Trịnh Sâm defeated the ancient enemy of the northern state, the Nguyễn lords in the south. The Trịnh line was separate from the royal Lê dynasty, and the officially recognized emperor was Lê Hiển Tông (1740–1786), who continued to occupy the royal throne in Thăng Long (modern-day Hanoi), but without real power.

== Early reign ==
Trịnh Sam was given rule over northern Vietnam by his father Trịnh Doanh in 1767. Five years after he took power, the Tây Sơn rebellion started in the south. During his lifetime, the Tây Sơn rebels focused all their efforts against the Nguyễn lords, specifically against Nguyễn Phuc Thuan who had gained the throne as a young boy. As the Tây Sơn rebellion gained strength, the Trịnh saw the Nguyễn weakening month by month.

== Trịnh–Nguyễn War ==
Trịnh Sâm mobilized the royal (Trịnh) army, and on November 15, 1774, it crossed the river into Nguyễn territory, re-igniting the Trịnh–Nguyễn War. With the Nguyễn army divided and weak, the Trịnh army captured Phú Xuân (modern-day Huế) in February 1775. The army continued south capturing more Nguyễn lands and defeating some of the forces of the Tây Sơn. In the summer of 1775, one of the leaders of the Tây Sơn, Nguyễn Nhac, made a formal alliance with Trịnh Sam against the Nguyễn. Trịnh Sam agreed and gave Nguyễn Nhac a formal title as well as "regalia". The Trịnh army then withdrew back to Tonkin, left a small army in Phú Xuân.

== Later life ==
For the remainder of Trịnh Sâm's life, the Trịnh allowed emperor Gia Long (Nguyễn Ánh), the last surviving member of the Nguyễn lords, to make repeated attempts to re-take the south. The Tây Sơn brothers were too busy fighting the Nguyễn loyalists to worry about the Trịnh in the north. In 1782 as Trịnh Sâm was dying, he tried to leave control over Vietnam to his son (from his favorite consort or wife, Đặng Thị Huệ, who led the harem when he died — her position was only inferior to that of his deceased primary consort Hoàng Thị Ngọc Khoan), Trịnh Cán, but his older son, Trịnh Khải (whose mother was the high-born unloved Dương Thị Ngọc Hoan, who was only able to share the bed of Trịnh Sâm through treachery) organized an army and fought against his half-brother. Although he was successful, this civil war fatally divided the Trịnh at a critical time when the Tây Sơn (under Nguyễn Huệ) were gaining control over the south.

== In popular culture ==
- Đêm hội Long Trì, a 1989 Vietnamese movie produced by Vietnam Feature film Studio and starring by Thế Anh as Trịnh Sâm.

== See also ==
- List of Vietnamese monarchs
- Lê dynasty

== Sources ==
- Encyclopedia of Asian History, Volume 4. 1988. Charles Scribner's Sons, New York.
- Tay Son Rebelion - Chronology
- Annam and it Minor Currency Chapter 16 (downloaded May 2006)

Vietnamese royalty
Preceded by Trịnh Doanh	Trịnh lords Lord of Tonkin; 1767-1782	Succeeded by Trịnh Cán
