= William Louis, Prince of Anhalt-Köthen =

German prince

William Louis of Anhalt-Köthen
- Prince of Anhalt-Köthen
- Born: 3 August 1638; Köthen
- Died: 13 April 1665 (aged 26); Köthen
- Spouse: Elisabeth Charlotte of Anhalt-Harzgerode
- House: House of Ascania
- Father: Louis I
- Mother: Sophie

William Louis of Anhalt-Köthen (3 August 1638, in Köthen – 13 April 1665, in Köthen), was a German prince of the House of Ascania and ruler of the principality of Anhalt-Köthen.

== Early life ==
He was the second son of Louis I, Prince of Anhalt-Köthen, but second-born son of his second wife Countess Sophie of Lippe, daughter of Simon VI, Count of Lippe.

== Life ==
William Louis was only twelve years of age when he succeeded his father in Köthen in 1650. During his minor years, his uncle Prince Augustus of Anhalt-Plötzkau acted as regent. After the death of Augustus in 1653, his sons Lebrecht and Emmanuel took over the regency until William was formally proclaimed of age in 1659.

In Köthen on 25 August 1663 William Louis married Elisabeth Charlotte (b. Harzgerode, 11 February 1647 - d. Osterholm, 20 January 1723), daughter of his cousin Frederick, Prince of Anhalt-Harzgerode, and granddaughter of Christian I, Prince of Anhalt-Bernburg. The union was childless.

On his death without issue, the line of Anhalt-Köthen became extinct. His principality was inherited by his cousins and former regents, Lebrecht and Emmanuel of Anhalt-Plötzkau, who took the name of Anhalt-Köthen as the principal title of their family. Their former principality of Plötzkau was given to Victor Amadeus of the principality of Anhalt-Bernburg, from which it was originally extracted.

William Louis, Prince of Anhalt-Köthen House of Ascania Born: 3 August 1638 Died: 13 April 1665
Preceded by Louis	Prince of Anhalt-Köthen; 1650–1665	Succeeded by Lebrecht and Emmanuel
