= Plötzkau =

- Municipality
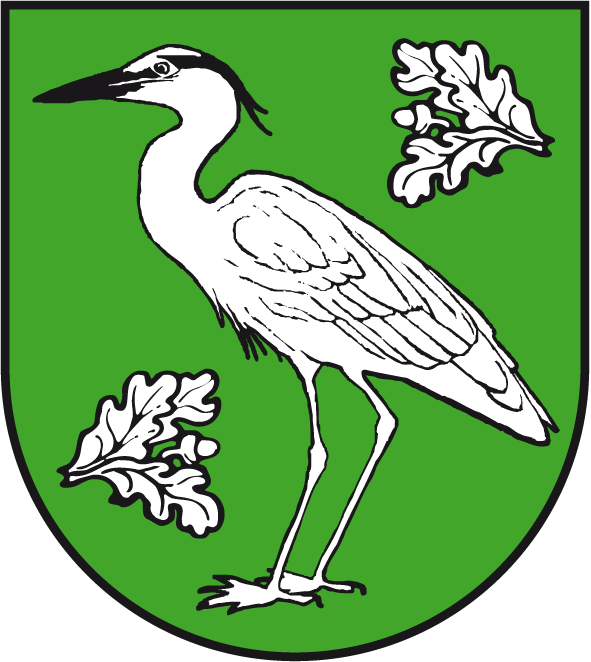
- Coat of arms

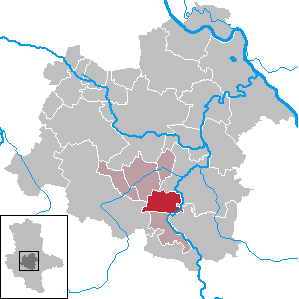
- Location of Plötzkau within Salzlandkreis district
- Interactive map of Plötzkau
- Location within Germany Location within Saxony-Anhalt
- Coordinates: 51°45′00″N 11°40′59″E
- Country: Germany
- State: Saxony-Anhalt
- District: Salzlandkreis
- Municipal assoc.: Saale-Wipper

Government
  - Mayor (2021–28): Peter Rosenhagen

Area
  - Total: 23.91 km^{2} (9.23 sq mi)
- Elevation: 61 m (200 ft)

Population (2025-12-31)
  - Total: 1,165
  - Density: 48.72/km^{2} (126.2/sq mi)
- Time zone: UTC+01:00 (CET)
  - Summer (DST): UTC+02:00 (CEST)
- Postal codes: 06425
- Dialling codes: 034692
- Vehicle registration: SLK

Plötzkau is a municipality in the district of Salzlandkreis, in Saxony-Anhalt, Germany.
