= Stolberg =

Stolberg may refer to:

== Towns in Germany ==
- Stolberg (Harz) in the district of Mansfeld-Südharz in Saxony-Anhalt, seat of the counts of Stolberg.
- Stolberg (Rhineland) in the district of Aachen in North Rhine-Westphalia, part of the Duchy of Jülich until 1794, awarded to Prussia in 1815.
- Stollberg, in the Erzgebirgskreis in the Free State of Saxony.

== Former states of the Holy Roman Empire ==
- County of Stolberg, created from the County of Hohnstein in 1210 and partitioned to Harz line (S-Stolberg) and Rhenish line (S-Rochefort and S-Königstein) in 1548
- Stolberg-Gedern, partitioned from S-Wernigerode in 1677 and reunited thereto in 1804
- Stolberg-Königstein, created from the partition of the County of Stolberg in 1548
- Stolberg-Rochefort, created from the partition of the County of Stolberg in 1548
- Stolberg-Rossla, partitioned from S-Stolberg in 1706, mediatised to the Electorate of Saxony in 1803 and awarded to Prussia in 1815
- Stolberg-Schwarza, rejoined S-Wernigerode in 1748
- Stolberg-Stolberg, created from the partition of the County of Stolberg in 1548, partitioned in 1645 and 1706 to create S-Werngerode and S-Rossla, mediatised to the Electorate of Saxony in 1803 and awarded to Prussia in 1815
- Stolberg-Wernigerode, partitioned from S-Stolberg in 1645, partitioned to create S-Gedern in 1677, mediatised to Westphalia in 1807 and awarded to Prussia in 1815

== People ==
Listed in chronological order by date of birth:

- The House of Stolberg, a large German noble family (Hoher Adel) with many branches.
- Count Botho of Stolberg the Elder († 1455)
- Count Henry the Younger of Stolberg (1467–1508), Governor of Frisia
- Anna II of Stolberg (1504–1574), imperial abbess of Quedlinburg
- Countess Juliana of Stolberg-Wernigerode (1506–1580), mother of William I of Orange, leader of the Dutch Revolt against the Spanish in the 16th century and co-founder of the current Dutch royal family House of Orange-Nassau.
- Count Henry of Stolberg (1509–1572)
- Count Christian Ernest of Stolberg-Wernigerode (1691–1771)
- Prince Frederick Charles of Stolberg-Gedern (1693–1767)
- Countess Ferdinande Henriette of Stolberg-Gedern (1699–1750)
- Count Henry Ernest of Stolberg-Wernigerode (1716–1778)
- Count Christian Frederick of Stolberg-Wernigerode (1746–1824)
- Christian, Count of Stolberg-Stolberg (1748–1821), German poet, translator and lyricist
- Friedrich Leopold, Graf zu Stolberg-Stolberg (1750–1819), German poet, translator and lawyer
- Catharine Stolberg (1751–1832), Danish-German countess and writer
- Princess Louise of Stolberg-Gedern (1752–1824), wife of Bonnie Prince Charlie, pretender to the thrones of Great Britain and Ireland
- Countess Augusta Louise of Stolberg-Stolberg (1753–1835)
- Countess Louise of Stolberg-Wernigerode (1771–1856), Abbess of Drübeck Abbey
- Count Henry of Stolberg-Wernigerode (1772–1854)
- Count Anthony of Stolberg-Wernigerode (1785–1854)
- Prince Otto of Stolberg-Wernigerode (1837–1896), Governor of the Prince of Hanover, German Vice-Chancellor under Bismarck

== Fiction ==
- Stolberg (television series), a German detective television series named for its lead character Martin Stolberg
