= County of Wernigerode =

Countship

County of Wernigerode Grafschaft Wernigerode
- 1121–1429
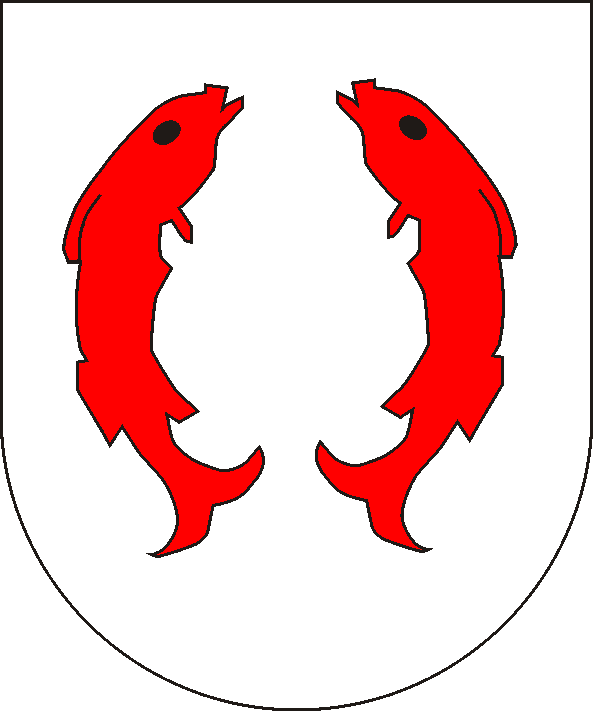
- Coat of arms

- County of Wernigerode ( red) in the mid 13th century. The highlighted territories ( cream) are the Altmark territory of Brandenburg (east), of whom Wernigerode became a vassal in 1268, and the neighbouring Duchy of Brunswick-Lüneburg (north and west, which is shown merely for clarity).
- Status: State of the Holy Roman Empire
- Capital: Wernigerode
- Government: County
- Historical era: Middle Ages
  - Established: 1121
  - Vassals of Brandenburg: 1268
  - Vassals of Magdeburg: 1381
  - Inherited by Stolberg: 1429
  - Division into Stolberg-Wernigerode: 31 May 1645
| Preceded by | Succeeded by |
| Duchy of Saxony | County of Stolberg |

The County of Wernigerode (German: Grafschaft Wernigerode) was a state of the Holy Roman Empire which arose in the Harzgau region of the former Duchy of Saxony, at the northern foot of the Harz mountain range. The comital residence was at Wernigerode, now part of Saxony-Anhalt, Germany. The county was ruled by a branch of the House of Stolberg from 1429 until its mediatization to the Kingdom of Prussia in 1806. Nevertheless, the county remained in existence - with one short interruption - until the dissolution of the Kingdom of Prussia in 1918.

== History ==
The counts of Wernigerode had established themselves as relatively independent, aristocratic rulers in the Eastphalian lands north of the Harz range, rivalling with the comital House of Regenstein. For more than two centuries from the High Middle Ages, they ruled over extended estates stretching from the Oker river in the west to the glacial valley of the Großes Bruch. The male line finally died out in 1429.

=== Establishment ===
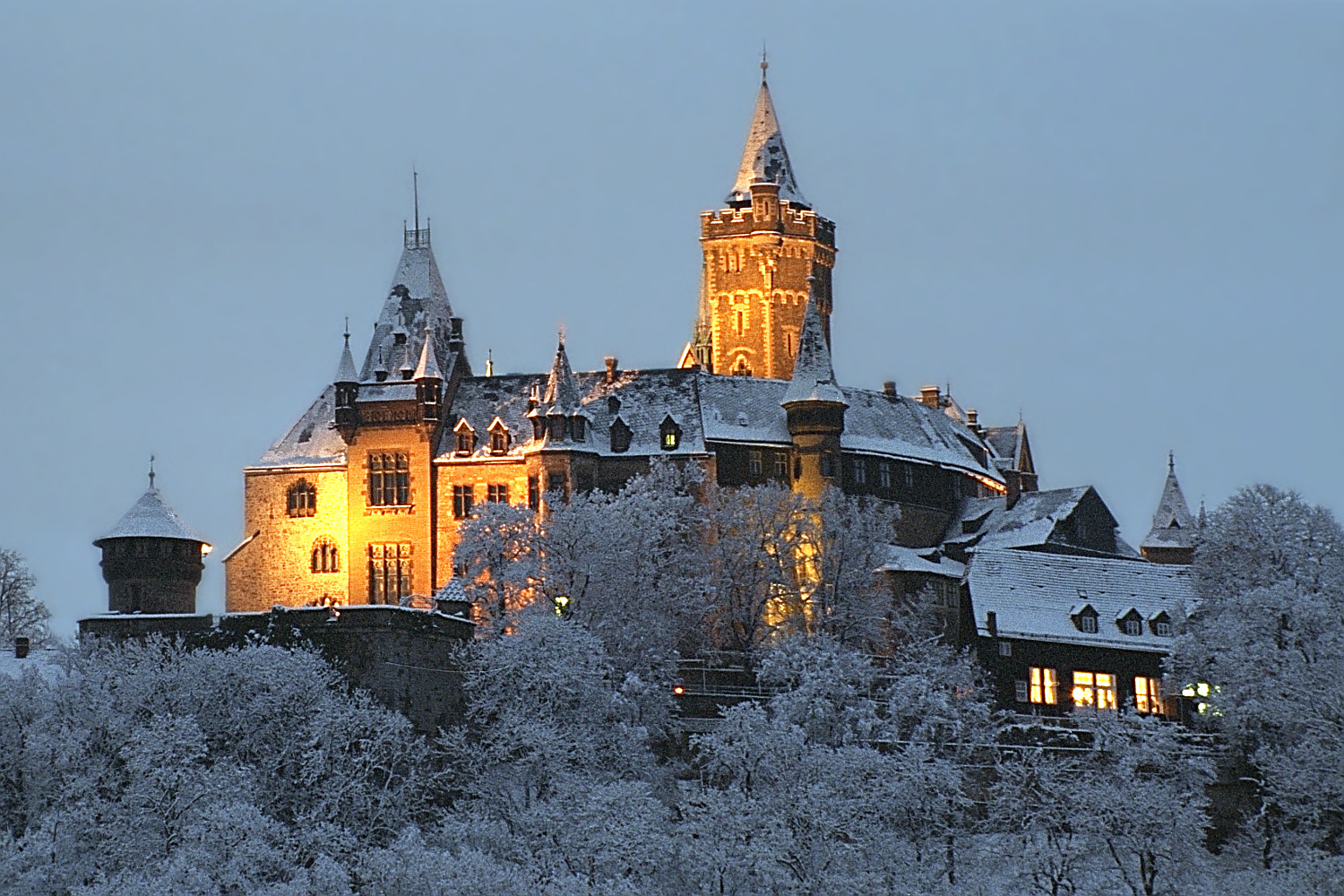
Wernigerode Castle, rebuilt in the 19th century

In the early 12th century, one Count Adalbert from Haimar near Hanover, first mentioned in 1103 and named comes Adelbertus de villa Heymbere in 1117, appears on just one occasion as Adelbertus comes de Wernigerode, when he is listed as one of the witnesses to a document issued by Bishop Reinhard of Halberstadt on 18 October 1121. This first appearance of a Wernigerode count is also the first record of the clearing settlement of Wernigerode, whose beginnings, however, date roughly to a century earlier. Wernigerode Castle is first mentioned in 1213 as a castrum and served as the permanent residence of the subsequent Counts of Wernigerode.

The counts of Wernigerode remained in possession of important property in the region between Hildesheim, Burgdorf and the Steinwedel Forest until the end of the 14th century. The extent of those estates has led to conjecture that the comital estate at the foot of the Harz in Wernigerode was even greater and more valuable still, encouraging the counts to abandon their old seat in Haimar and settle here. Nevertheless, estimates of the size and wealth of the comital estate are always hampered by the difficulty of being able to compare it with any suitable benchmark or population figures. Consequently, it is also probable, that the centres of power of Wernigerode and Haimar existed alongside one another.

The family seat of Wernigerode was located in the middle of Imperial domains (Reichsgut), and according to the preface of the Sachsenspiegel the counts of Wernigerode descended from Swabia. Since the Salian emperor, Henry IV, preferred to employ mainly free knights and ministeriales from Swabia to encounter the Saxon Revolts, a delegation of former vassals of his noble family appearing on the northern edge of the Harz seems to make sense. Furthermore, the counts of Wernigerode held the Steinberg estates near the Imperial domains of Goslar, on the spur of which Henry IV had tasked the Saxon count Otto of Nordheim, later his fiercest rival, to construct a castle. In view of the conflict between the emperor and Otto of Nordheim and the political superiority of the pro-imperial nobility at the Harz after Otto's death in 1083, there was a legal succession awarded to Count Adalbert I or to one of his ancestors, achieved by the allocation of estates, at the instigation of Henry IV.

Threatened by the neighbouring Welf dukes of Brunswick-Lüneburg during the Great Interregnum, the Wernigerode counts lost Imperial immediacy as early as 1268, when they chose to become vassals of the Ascanian margraves of Brandenburg and, subsequently, of the Prince-archbishops of Magdeburg in 1381, after a protracted dispute about the former Imperial castle at Pabstorf. The counts had hoped that they would receive greater protection of the castle and town of Wernigerode against the overpowering pressure from their Brunswick neighbours, however, their expectations were not fulfilled in the long run. When they acquired further territories from the Counts of Regenstein in 1343, they held these fiefs as vassals of the Halberstadt bishops and the Wernigerode counts as well as their Stolberg successors were issued with separate deeds of enfeoffment for their estates until the transfer of the Halberstadt territories to the Brandenburg electors by the 1648 Peace of Westphalia.

=== House of Stolberg ===
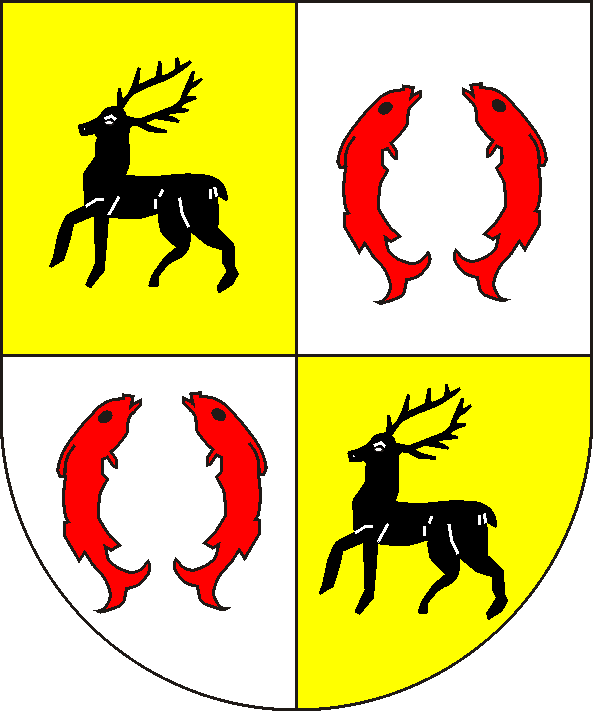
Stolberg-Wernigerode coat of arms

Count Henry of Wernigerode was the last male representative of the dynasty. He demanded from Archbishop Günther II of Magdeburg the enfeoffment of the castle and town of Wernigerode for himself and his two Stolberg cousins Henry and his brother Bodo the Elder, then ruling over the Thuringian County of Stolberg south of the Harz range. The inheritance was secured on 30 June 1414. As one of the heirs chosen by the last Wernigerode count, Henry of Stolberg, died young, Count Henry of Wernigerode in 1417 had the people of the county swear fealty to Count Bodo of Stolberg as the future owner of the lordship of Wernigerode.

As Count Bodo had the fortune to become the sole Stolberg heir at that same time, it became necessary, however, for him to establish his permanent seat of power at Stolberg Castle. This was a setback for the further development of Wernigerode because, after the death of Count Henry of Wernigerode in 1429, no count resided permanently in the town. The demise of Wernigerode was reinforced by the fact that Count Bodo started in 1438, to pledge the castle and its associated lordship.

It was a very lucrative fief that included the spiritual fiefdom of the Monastery of St. George and St. Sylvester at Wernigerode, the abbeys of Himmelpforten, Ilsenburg and Drübeck, and the villages of Drübeck, Reddeber, Langeln with its Teutonic Order, Wasserleben with its nunnery, and Veckenstedt with its important aristocratic seat (Adelshof). The lordship of Wernigerode was thus much more significant than that of the stem county of Stolberg which did not have a single monastery within its borders.

The actual county reduced in size during the 16th century to the comital district (gräfliche Amt) of Wernigerode that, for example, had the following tax receipts (Schoss) in 1543/44:

- Wernigerode Altstadt - 100 marks
- Wernigerode Neustadt - 13 marks, 16 pieces
- Drübeck - 30.5 marks
- Wasserleben - 21.5 marks
- Langeln - 22 marks
- Silstedt - 5 marks
- Ilsenburg - 2 marks
- Darlingerode - 3 marks
- For the abandoned village of Steinbruch near Drübeck - 4 Vierdung
- Inheritance tax from Wernigerode, Veckenstedt, Silstedt, Langeln, Wasserleben and the chapter of St. Sylvester and George at Wernigerode etc.

In toto the Amtmann of Wernigerode collected 5,120 guilders in 1543/44, compared with just 4,247 guelders the year before. Against that the expenditure for the district was 3,456 guelders, leaving a profit of 1,664 guelders. That was a considerable sum, if one considers that in that year a new minting workshop had been built for 50 guelders.

For more than 200 years, both territories were ruled in personal union by the House of Stolberg. Held by the Stolberg-Stolberg line from 1548, the comital dynasty again divided their dominions when in 1710 Count Christian Ernest received the Stolberg-Wernigerode territory from the estate of his uncle Count Ernest of Stolberg. He relocated his residence to Wernigerode Castle which he had extensively restored. Nevertheless, in 1714 he had to acknowledge the overlordship of the Prussian Principality of Halberstadt. Finally mediatized, the county was incorporated into the Prussian Province of Saxony in 1815.

== Rulers ==
=== Counts of Wernigerode ===
- (1103) 1121-1133 Albert I of Wernigerode
- 1134-1165 Albert II of Wernigerode
- 1173-1214 Albert III of Wernigerode
- 1217-1252 Conrad I of Wernigerode
- 1217-1269 Gebhard I of Wernigerode
- 1217-1231 Burchard of Wernigerode
- 1254-1293 Conrad II of Wernigerode (son of Gebhard I) (in 1268 Wernigerode became a fief of Brandenburg)
- 1268-1319 Albert V of Wernigerode
- 1297-1339 Conrad III of Wernigerode (married Helene, daughter of John, Duke of Brunswick-Lüneburg)
- 1325-1370 Conrad IV of Wernigerode
- 1358-1407 Conrad V of Wernigerode
- 1375-3 June 1429 Henry IV of Wernigerode
  - in 1417 there was an inheritance arrangement with the comital House of Stolberg, who ruled the county from 1429

=== Counts of Stolberg ===
- 1429-1455 Bodo VII
- 1455-1511 Henry IX
- 1511-1538 Bodo VIII
- 1538-1552 Wolfgang
- 1552-1587 Henry, Louis, and Albert George (regents)
- 1587-1606 Wolf Ernest
- 1606-1638 Christopher II
- 1639-1672 Henry Ernest
- 1672-1710 Ernest

=== House of Stolberg-Wernigerode ===
- 1710-1771 Christian Ernest of Stolberg-Wernigerode
- 1771-1778 Henry Ernest of Stolberg-Wernigerode
- 1778-1824 Christian Frederick of Stolberg-Wernigerode
- 1824-1854 Henry of Stolberg-Wernigerode
- 1854-1896 Otto of Stolberg-Wernigerode (from 1890: Prince of Stolberg-Wernigerode)

== Sources ==
- Köbler, Gerhard (1988). Historisches Lexikon der deutschen Länder (in German). Munich: Verlag C. H. Beck. p. 639. ISBN 3-406-33290-0.
- Schwineköper, Berent (1987). Handbuch der historischen Stätten Deutschlands, Band 11, Provinz Sachsen/Anhalt (in German). Stuttgart: Alfred Kröner Verlag. p. 644. ISBN 3-520-31402-9.
- Christian Friedrich Kesslin: Nachrichten von Schriftstellern und Künstlern der Grafschaft Wernigerode vom Jahre 1074 bis 1855. Commissions-Verlag von Gebrüder Bänsch in Magdeburg 1856. XII, 312 pp.
- Jan Habermann: Die Grafen von Wernigerode. Herrschaftsprofil, Wirkungsbereich und Königsnähe hochadliger Potentaten am Nordharz im späten Mittelalter. Norderstedt 2008 - ISBN 978-3-8370-2820-1
- Jan Habermann: Die Herrschaftsausweitung der Grafen von Wernigerode am Nordharz (1249 - 1369) digitalised
