= House of Stolberg =

German noble dynasty

Coat of arms of the counts of Stolberg before 1429

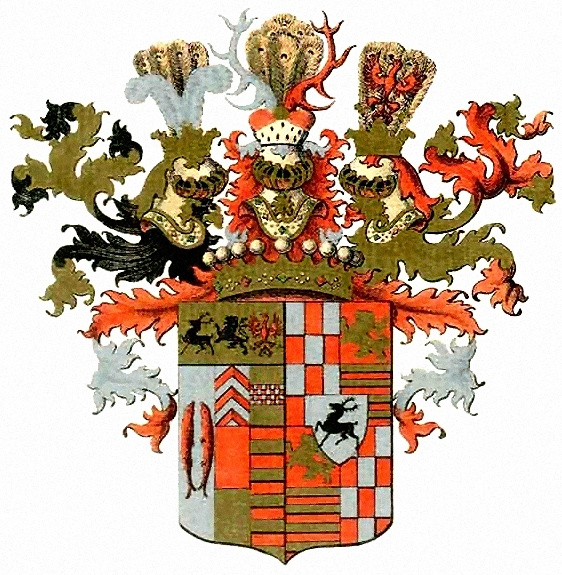
Overall coat of arms of the House of Stolberg from 1742

The House of Stolberg is an old and large German dynasty of the former Holy Roman Empire's high aristocracy (Hoher Adel). Members of the family held the title of Fürst and Graf. They played a significant role in feudal Germany's history and, as a mediatized dynasty, enjoyed princely privileges until the collapse of the German Empire in 1918. The house has numerous branches.

== History ==
There are over ten different theories about the origin of the counts of Stolberg, but none has been commonly accepted. Stolbergs themselves claimed descent from the 6th century Italian noble, Otto Colonna. This claim was symbolized by the column device on the Stolberg arms. However, it is most likely that they are descended from the counts of Hohnstein, when in 1222 Heinrich I of Hohnstein wrested the county from Ludwig III. The first representative of this family, Count Henry of Stolberg, appears in a 1210 document, having already been mentioned in 1200 as Count Henry of Voigtstedt. Although Voigtstedt near Artern was the initial seat of this comital family, it had moved to Stolberg (Harz) no later than the beginning of the 13th century. The castle there remained in the hands of the family until they were dispossessed as part of the 1945 land reform in the Soviet Zone of occupation in Germany created after the Second World War.

In 1429 the counts of Stolberg succeeded in purchasing the County of Wernigerode in the Northern Harz as part of a contract of inheritance and thereby extended their area of influence considerably.

In 1645 the house was permanently divided into the Older Main Line (Ältere Hauptlinie) of Stolberg-Wernigerode and the Younger Main Line (Jüngere Hauptlinie) of Stolberg-Stolberg. At the beginning of the 18th century, the lines of Stolberg-Gedern (to 1804) and Stolberg-Schwarza (to 1748) branched off from Stolberg-Wernigerode. In 1706, Stolberg-Stolberg was divided into the two lines of Stolberg-Stolberg and Stolberg-Rossla.

In 1742 representatives of the line of Stolberg-Gedern were elevated to the Estate of Imperial Princes (Reichsfürstenstand) by Emperor Charles VII.

In the 18th century, as a result of mediatisation, the imperially immediate counts of Stolberg-Wernigerode were forced to subordinate themselves to the Kingdom of Prussia and the counts of Stolberg-Stolberg and Stolberg-Roßla likewise to the Electorate of Saxony. On the dissolution of the Holy Roman Empire's German nation in 1806 the Stolbergs lost their imperial comital status and, in 1815, finally became mediatized Prussian princes. However, the families retained certain privileges as to the Lutheran state churches of their mediatised state countries and had heritable seats in the Prussian House of Lords.

The head of each comital branch and his first-born son or heir presumptive in the Houses of Stolberg-Wernigerode, Stolberg-Stolberg and Stolberg-Roßla were granted permission on 22 October 1890 and 1893 respectively by Emperor Wilhelm II to bear princely titles. In 1980 a branch of the line of Stolberg-Stolberg was incorporated into the Dutch nobility as counts without, however, acknowledgement of their princely title.

== Former territories, estates and seats (selection) ==
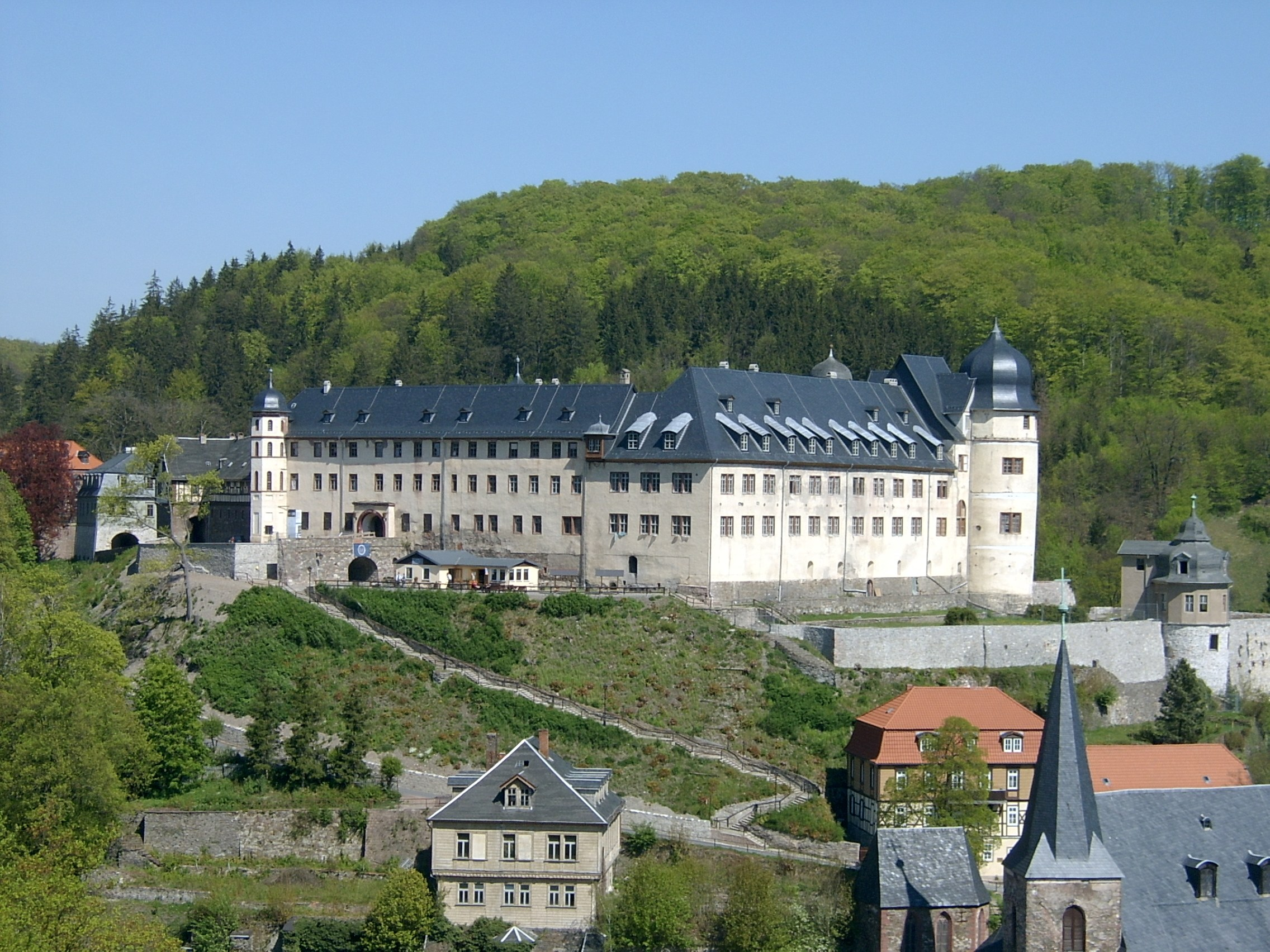
Stolberg Castle

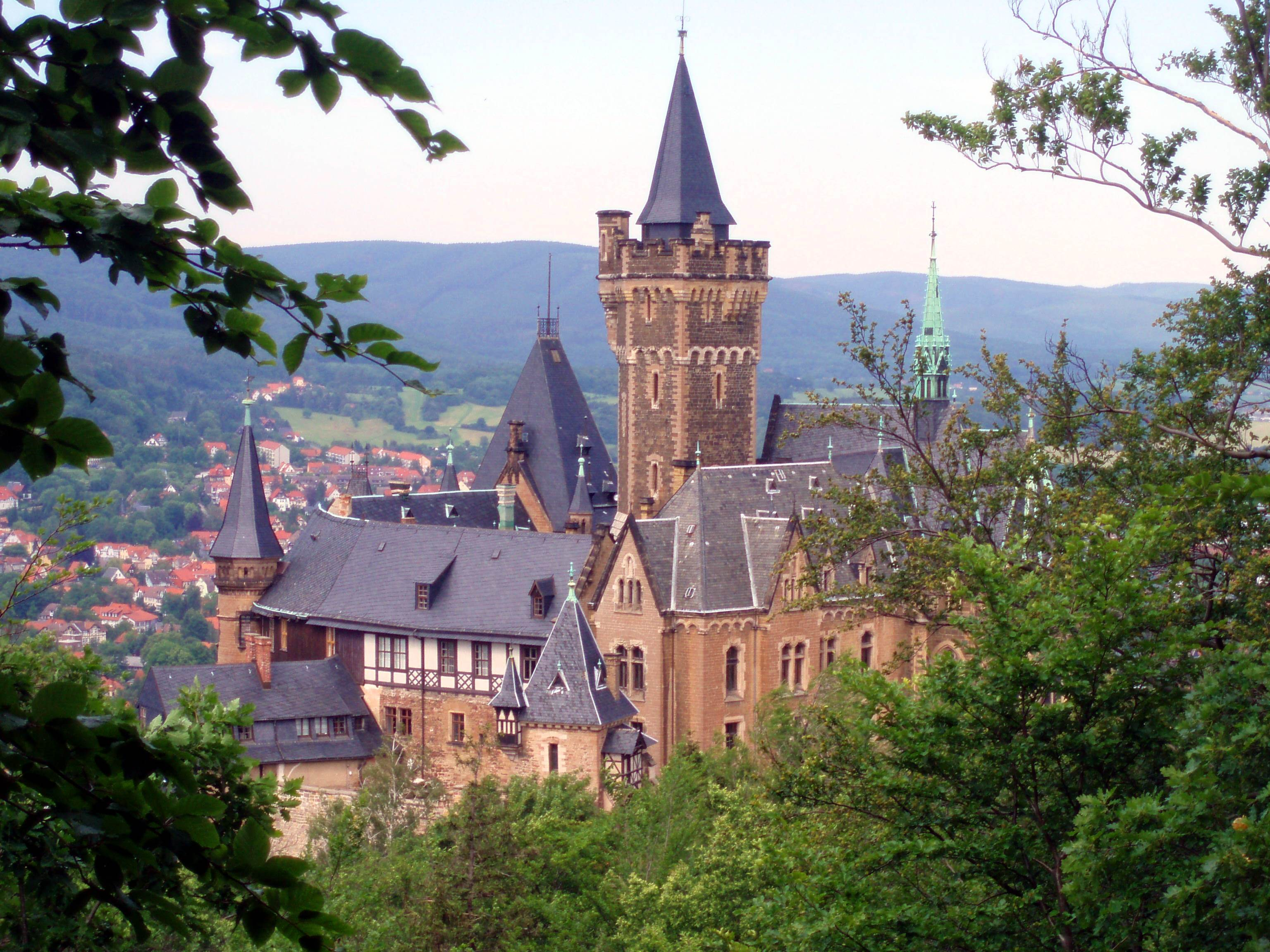
Wernigerode Castle

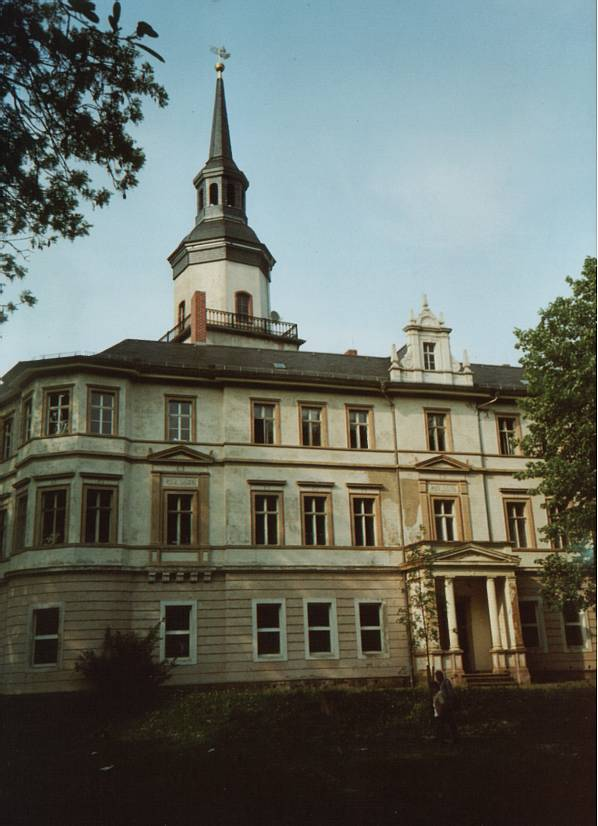
Rossla Castle

=== Territories ===
- County of Stolberg (1200–1945)
- County of Wernigerode (1429–1945)
- County of Stolberg-Rossla (1341–1945)
- Barony of Gedern (Hesse) (the castle 1535-1987, the estate until today)
- Barony of Schwarza, Thuringia
- Hohnstein Castle (Harz)
- Elbingerode (Harz) (1427–1600)
- Kelbra
- Heringen, Thuringia

=== Estates ===
- Allstedt (1542–1575)
- Ebersburg (Harz)
- Erichsberg Castle
- Ernstburg
- Grasburg (Rottleberode)
- Heinrichsberg Castle
- Hirzenhain, Hesse (since 1535 until today)
- Ilsenburg Abbey and Ilsenburg House, Thuringia (16th century - 1945)
- Jannowitz, Silesia
- Königstein Castle (1535–1581)
- Kreppelhof, Silesia
- Morungen
- Oberröblingen
- Ortenberg, Hesse (since 1535 until today)
- Peterswaldau, Silesia
- Hofgut Ranstadt, Hesse (1535 until today)

The counts of Stolberg also had claims to the Belgian Agimont and bore this name in their title. However, an orthographic error crept in and it was not until an edict of 6 December 1780 that Count Christian Frederick of Stolberg-Wernigerode corrected the hitherto erroneous name of Aigmont to Agimont.

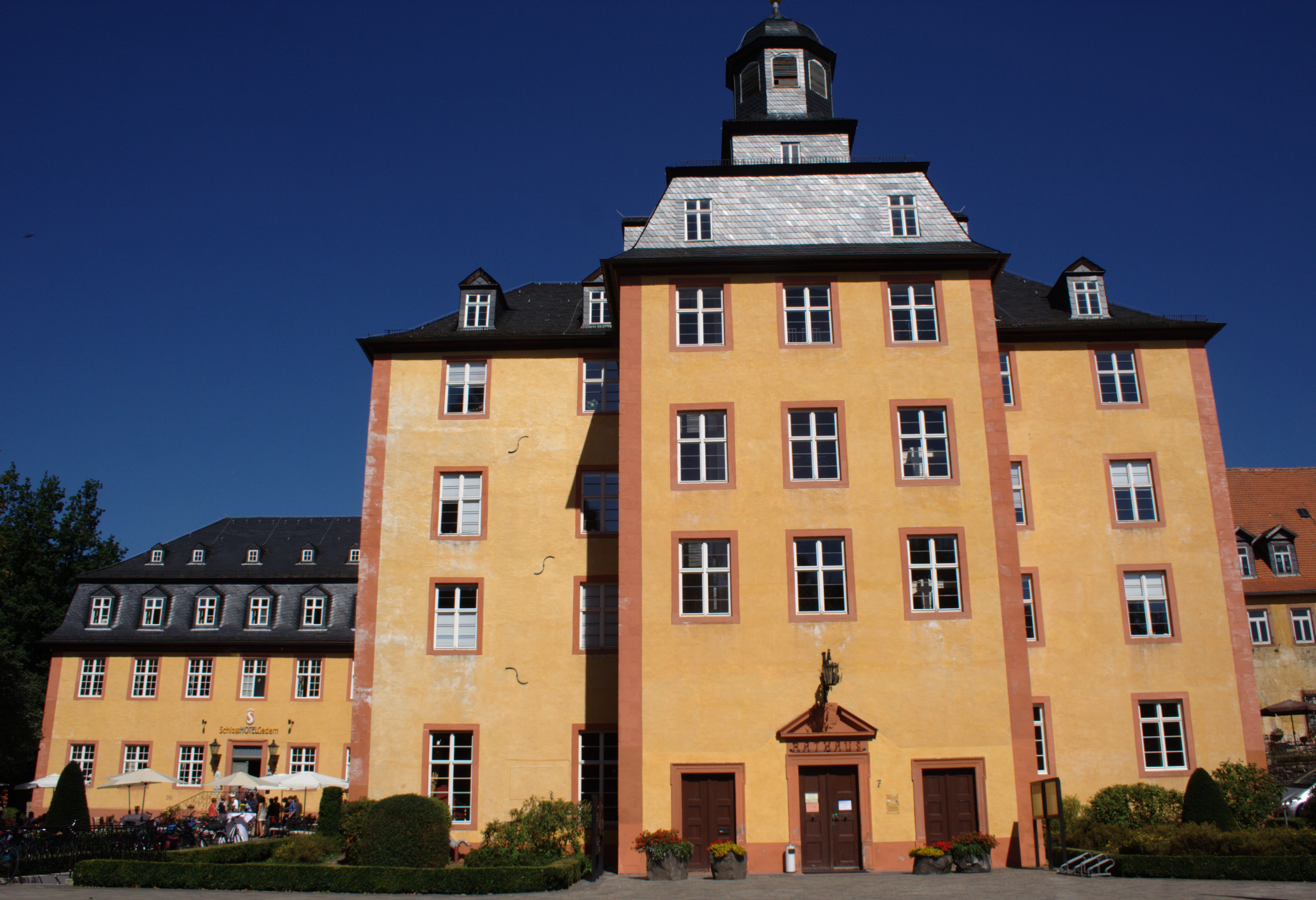
Gedern Castle (Hesse)

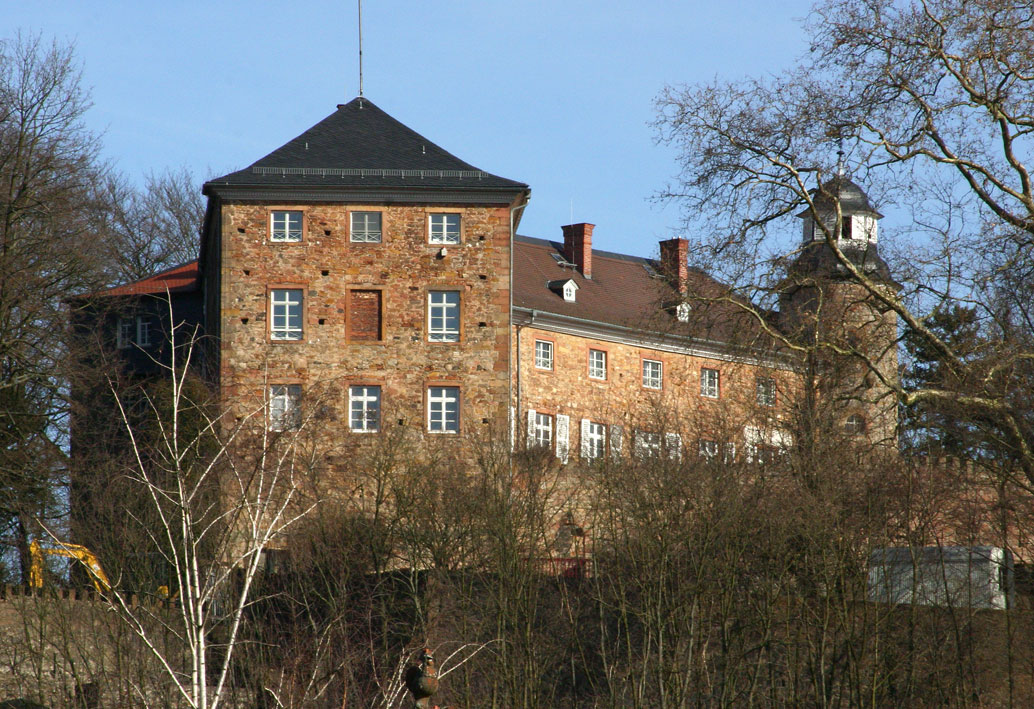
Ortenberg Castle (Hesse)

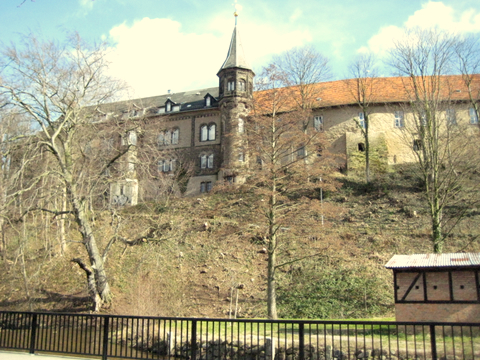
Ilsenburg House (Thuringia)

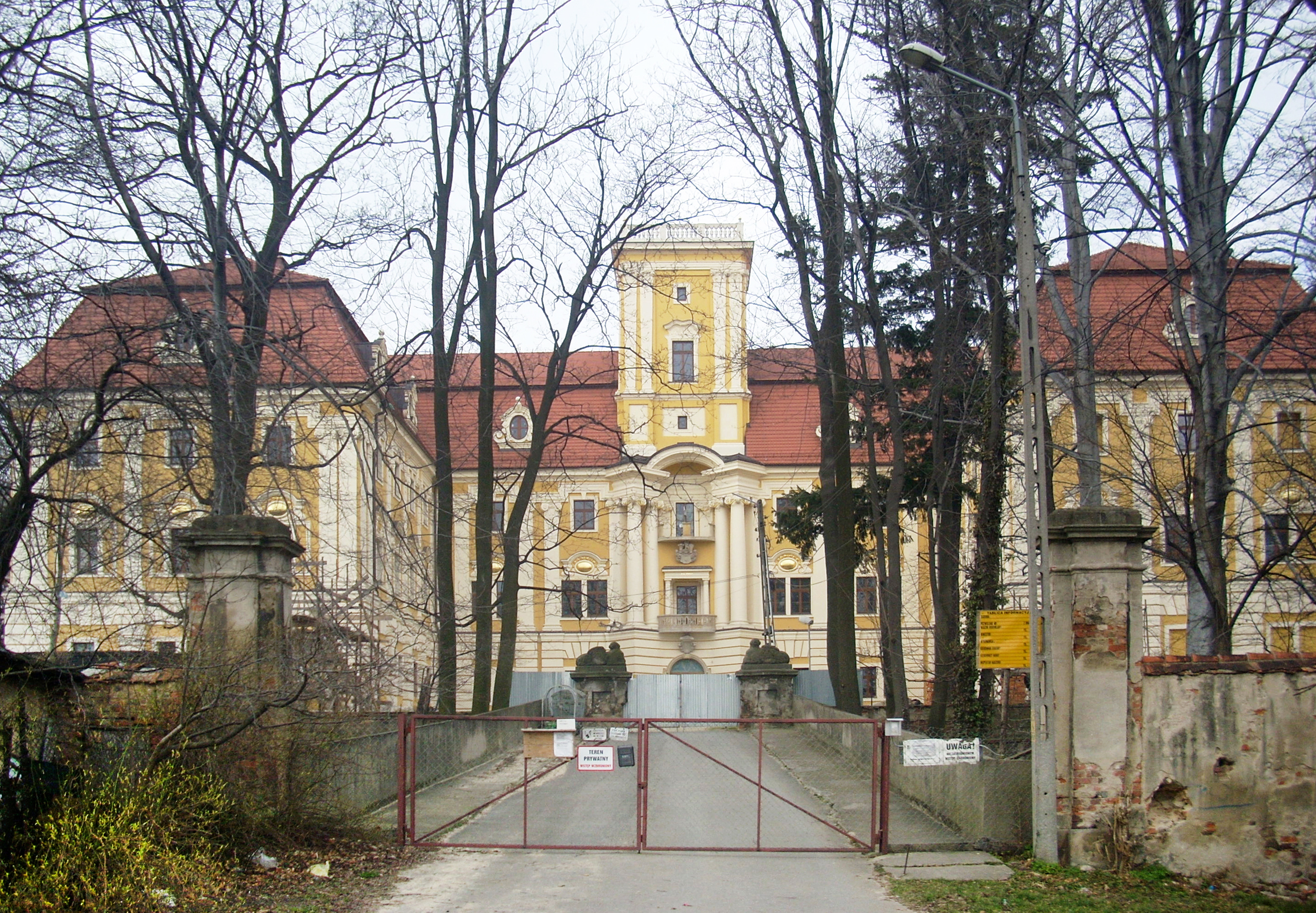
Peterswaldau Castle (Silesia)

== Important members of the family (selection) ==
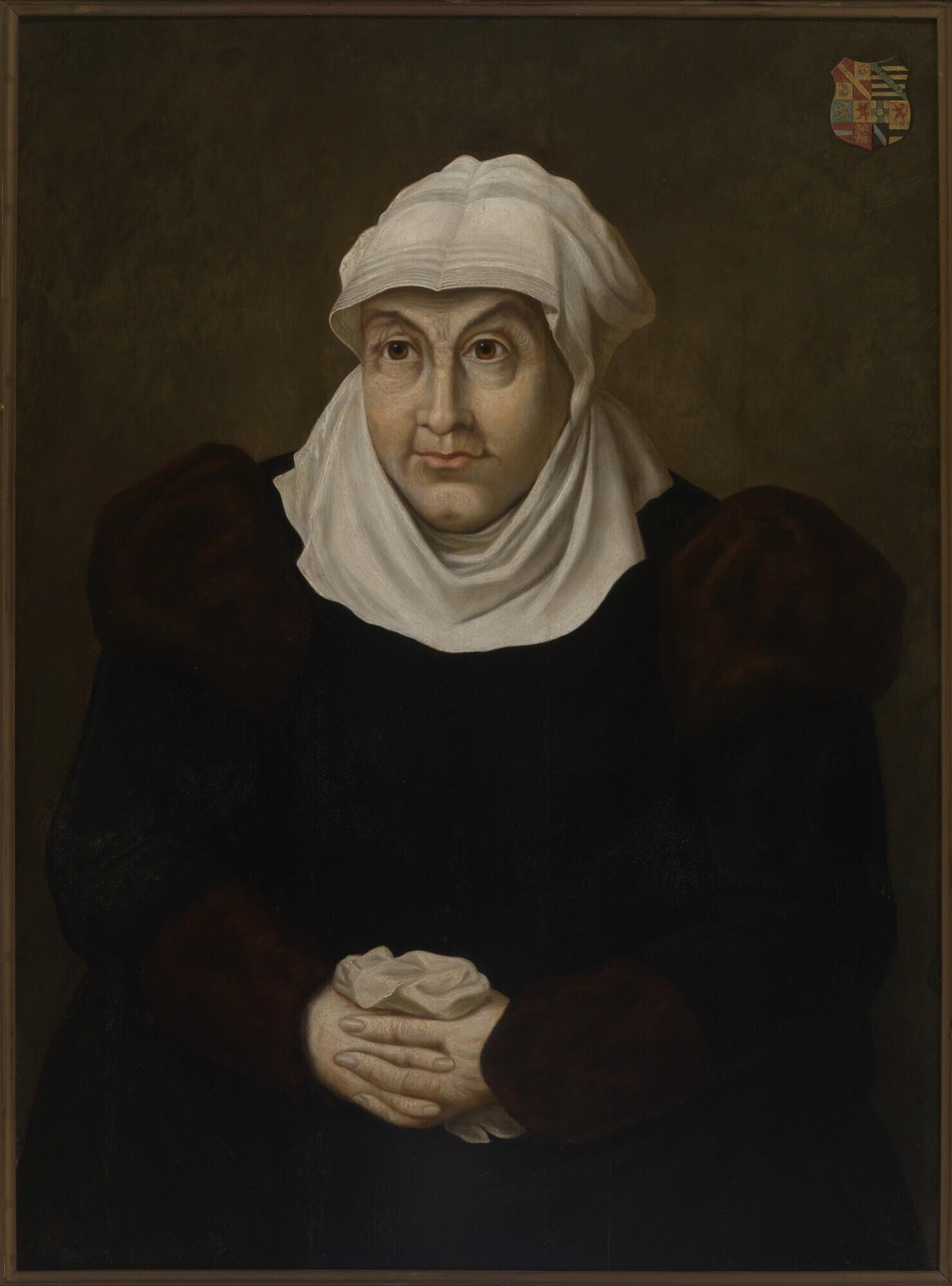
Juliana of Stolberg (1506–1580), wife of William, Count of Nassau and mother of William the Silent

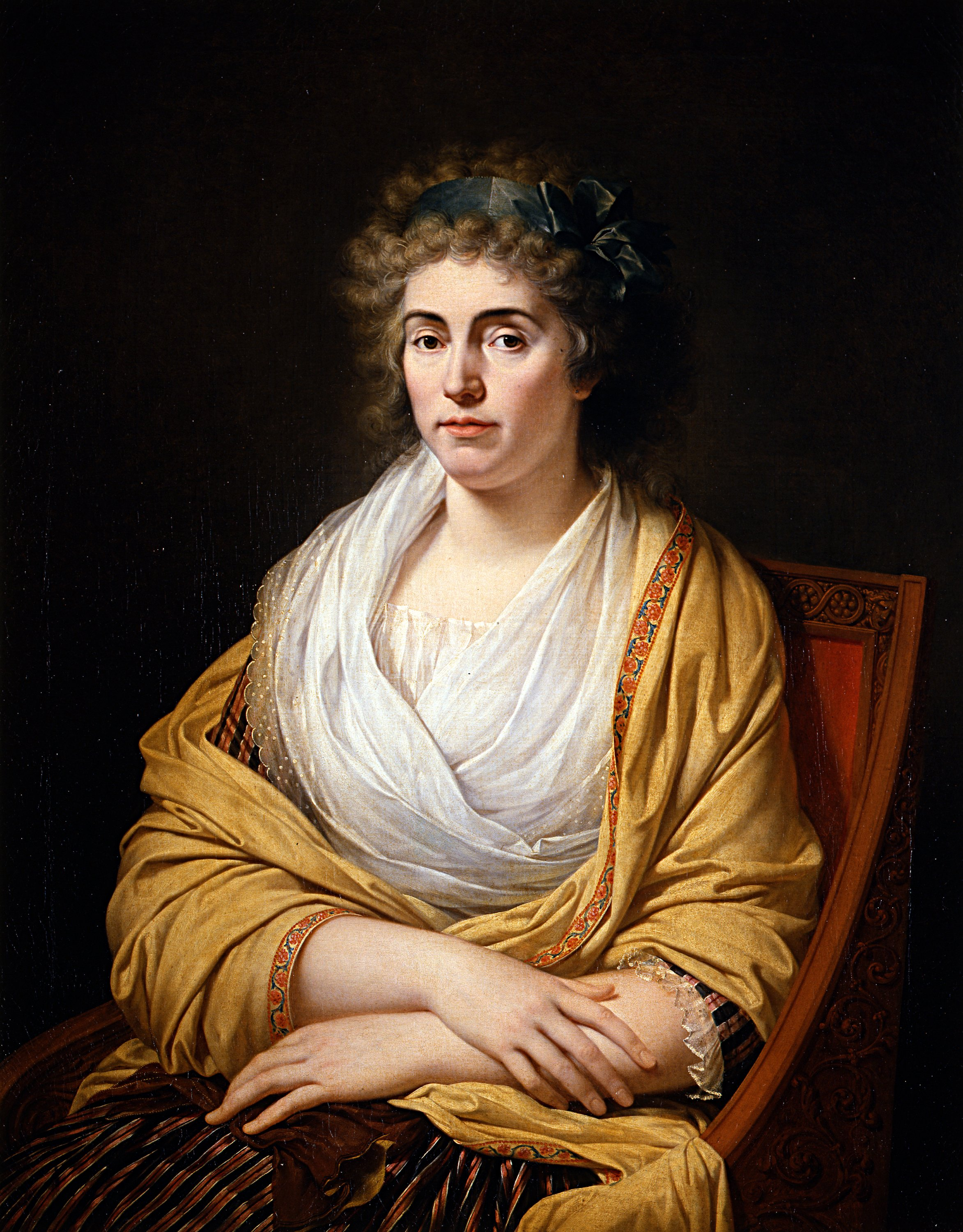
Princess Louise of Stolberg-Gedern, Countess of Albany (1752–1824), wife of the Jacobite claimant to the English and Scottish thrones Charles Edward Stuart ("Bonnie Prince Charlie")

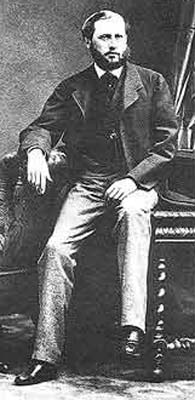
Prince Otto of Stolberg-Wernigerode (1837–1896), Vice-Chancellor of Germany

=== Early rulers of Stolberg county ===
- Heinrich I (ruled 1222–1231)
- Heinrich II (ruled 1231–1282)
- Heinrich III (ruled 1282–1303)
- Count Henry of Stolberg (ruled 1303–1347; died 1357), Bishop of Merseburg (1341–1357)
- Heinrich VI (ruled 1347–1368), Bishop of Merseburg (1384–1393)
- Count Botho of Stolberg the Elder (died 1455)
- Countess Katharina of Stolberg (1463–1535), Abbess of Drübeck Abbey
- Count Henry the Younger of Stolberg (1467–1508), Governor of Frisia
- Count Botho of Stolberg (1467–1538)
- Count Wolfgang of Stolberg (1501–1552)
- Anna II of Stolberg (1504–1574), imperial abbess of Quedlinburg
- Anna III of Stolberg (1565–1601), imperial abbess of Quedlinburg
- Count Louis of Stolberg (1505–1574)
- Countess Juliana of Stolberg (1506–1580)
- Count Henry of Stolberg (1509–1572)
- Count Wolf Ernest of Stolberg (1546–1606)
- Count Henry Ernest of Stolberg (1593–1672), founder of the Elder Main Line of the House of Stolberg
- Count John Martin of Stolberg (1594–1669), founder of the Younger Main Line of the House of Stolberg
- Count Ernest of Stolberg (1650–1710)

=== Line of Stolberg-Wernigerode ===
- Count Christian Ernest of Stolberg-Wernigerode (1691–1771)
- Count Henry Ernest of Stolberg-Wernigerode (1716–1778)
- Count Christian Frederick of Stolberg-Wernigerode (1746–1824)
- Countess Louise of Stolberg-Wernigerode (1771–1856), Abbess of Drübeck Abbey
- Count Henry of Stolberg-Wernigerode (1772–1854)
- Count Anthony of Stolberg-Wernigerode (1785–1854)
- Count William of Stolberg-Wernigerode (1807–1898), Prussian politician and general
- Count Eberhard of Stolberg-Wernigerode (1810–1872)
- Countess Anna of Stolberg-Wernigerode (1819–1868), Matron of Bethany (Oberin zu Bethanien)
- Count Bolko of Stolberg-Wernigerode (1823–1884), Landrat of the district of Franzburg
- Count Theodore of Stolberg-Wernigerode (1827–1902), member of the German Reichstag
- Countess Eleonora of Stolberg-Wernigerode (1835–1903)
- Prince Otto of Stolberg-Wernigerode (1837–1896), Governor of the Prince of Hanover, German Vice-Chancellor under Bismarck
- Princess Anna of Stolberg-Wernigerode (1837–1907), wife of Prince Otto
- Count Udo of Stolberg-Wernigerode (1840–1910)
- Count Constantine of Stolberg-Wernigerode (1843–1905), Governor of the Province of Hanover
- Magdalene, Countess of Stolberg-Wernigerode (1875–1955), Abbess of Drübeck Abbey
- Albert, Count of Stolberg-Wernigerode (1886–1948)
- Otto Count of Stolberg-Wernigerode (1893–1984)

=== Line of Stolberg-Gedern ===
- Prince Frederick Charles of Stolberg-Gedern (1693–1767)
- Princess Louise of Stolberg-Gedern (1752–1824)
- Princess Caroline of Stolberg-Gedern (1755–1828)

=== Line of Stolberg-Stolberg ===
- Countess Sophie Eleonora of Stolberg-Stolberg (1669–1745), funeral sermon compiler
- Count Christopher Frederick of Stolberg-Stolberg (1672–1738 in Stolberg) was a German regent
- Count Christian of Stolberg-Stolberg (1748–1821), translator and lyricist
- Count Frederick Leopold of Stolberg-Stolberg (1750–1819), poet, translator and lawyer
- Countess Augusta Louise of Stolberg-Stolberg (1753–1835)
- Countess Marianne of Stolberg-Stolberg (1780–1814)
- Count John Peter Cajus of Stolberg-Stolberg (1797–1874), manorial estate owner and Reichstag member
- Count Leopold Frederick of Stolberg-Stolberg (1799–1840)
- Countess Louise of Stolberg-Stolberg (1799–1875), lyricist, translator and editor
- Count Joseph Theodore of Stolberg-Stolberg (1804–1859)
- Count Alfred of Stolberg-Stolberg (1835–1880), manorial estate owner and Reichstag member
- Count Frederick of Stolberg-Stolberg (1836–1904), territorial lord and Reichstag member
- Count Adalbert of Stolberg-Stolberg (1840–1885), manorial estate owner and Reichstag member
- Hermann Joseph Count of Stolberg-Stolberg (1854–1925)
- Christoph Count of Stolberg-Stolberg (1888–1968), major general
- Frederick-Leopold Count of Stolberg-Stolberg (born 1962), lawyer
- Bishop Rupert Ferdinand Carl Thaddäus Antonius Maria Graf von Stolberg-Stolberg (born 1970)

=== Line of Stolberg-Roßla ===
- Count Jost Christian of Stolberg-Roßla senior (1676–1739) married Auguste Eleanore Gebser
- Count Frederick Botho of Stolberg-Roßla (1714–1768), Regent in Roßla from 1739
- Count Jost Christian of Stolberg-Roßla junior (1722–1749)
- Count William Christoph of Stolberg-Roßla (1748–1826), Regent of the County of Stolberg-Roßla

== Coat of arms ==
Family coat of arms : In Gold ein schreitender schwarzer Hirsch; auf dem Helm mit schwarz-goldenen Decken ein natürlicher Pfauenschweif zwischen 2 silbernen Straußenfedern.

== Sources ==
- Stammtafeln des mediatisierten Hauses Stolberg (in German), 1887
- Jörg Brückner (2005), Zwischen Reichsstandschaft und Standesherrschaft. Die Grafen zu Stolberg und ihr Verhältnis zu den Landgrafen von Thüringen und späteren Herzögen, Kurfürsten bzw. Königen von Sachsen 1210–1815 (in German), Verlag Janos Stekovics, ISBN 3-89923-119-8
- Genealogisches Handbuch des Adels, Fürstliche Häuser, Band XVIII, 2007
- Philipp Fürst zu Stolberg-Wernigerode und Jost-Christian Fürst zu Stolberg-Stolberg (ed.): Stolberg 1210–2010: Zur achthundertjährigen Geschichte des Geschlechts. Verlag Janos Stekovics, Dößel 2010, ISBN 978-3-89923-252-3.
