= Louise of Stolberg-Wernigerode =

- Born: 24 November 1771; Wernigerode Castle
- Died: 8 June 1856 (aged 84); Groß Krauschen
- Noble family: House of Stolberg
- Spouse: Moritz Haubold von Schönberg
- Father: Christian Frederick of Stolberg-Wernigerode
- Mother: Auguste Eleonore of Stolberg-Stolberg

Countess Louise of Stolberg-Wernigerode (24 November 1771 at Wernigerode Castle – 8 June, 1856 in Groß Krauschen) was abbess of Drübeck Abbey.

Louise was a member of the House of Stolberg, from the Harz area. She was the second eldest daughter of Count Christian Frederick of Stolberg-Wernigerode and his wife Auguste Eleonore of Stolberg-Stolberg. She was an older sister of Henry of Stolberg-Wernigerode.

From 1797 to 1800, she was abbess of Drübeck Abbey. On 21 December,1807, she left the abbey to marry Moritz Haubold von Schönberg. She moved to his estate in Groß Krauschen, which is now in Poland and renamed Gmina Bolesławiec, where she died in 1856.
