= Stollberg (disambiguation) =

Stollberg is a town in Saxony, Germany.

Stollberg may also refer to:

- Stollberg (Amt), a former municipal confederation in Schleswig-Holstein, Germany
- Stollberg (North Frisia), a hill of Schleswig-Holstein, Germany
- Stollberg (district), a former district in the Free State of Saxony, Germany

== See also ==
- Stolberg (disambiguation)
