= Christian Frederick of Stolberg-Wernigerode =

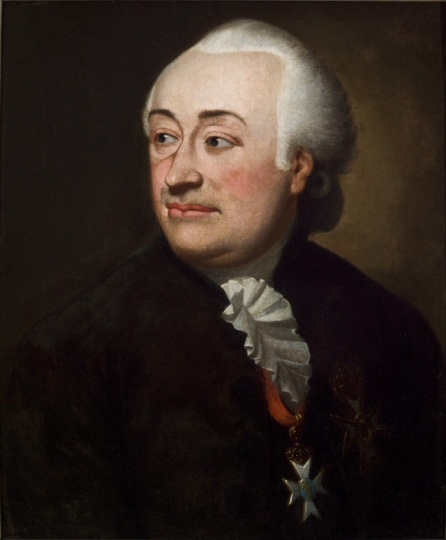
- Portrait by Karl Christian Kehrer, c. 1795
- Born: 8 January 1746; Wernigerode Castle
- Died: 26 May 1824 (aged 78); Pieszyce
- Noble family: House of Stolberg
- Spouse: Countess Auguste Eleonore of Stolberg-Stolberg
- Issue: Louise of Stolberg-Wernigerode, Henry of Stolberg-Wernigerode, Anton of Stolberg-Wernigerode
- Father: Henry Ernest of Stolberg-Wernigerode
- Mother: Princess Anna of Anhalt-Köthen

Count Christian Frederick of Stolberg-Wernigerode (German: Christian Friedrich (Graf) zu Stolberg-Wernigerode; 8 January 1746, Wernigerode Castle – 26 May 1824, Peterwaldau) was the only son of Count Henry Ernest of Stolberg-Wernigerode, whom he succeeded as ruler of the County of Wernigerode in 1778.

== Life ==
As the son of Henry Ernest, Count of Stolberg-Wernigerode, Christian Frederick was a member of the noble Stolberg family. His mother was Henry Ernest's second wife, Princess Anna of Anhalt-Köthen, daughter of Augustus Louis of Anhalt-Köthen by his second wife, Emilie (herself daughter of Erdmann II of Promnitz).

During his studies in Halle from 1764 to 1767 he joined the Freemason lodge zu den drei Degen. In the summer of 1767 he obtained the fourth and later the fifth grade at the lodge in Leipzig.

Count Christian Frederick was until 1796 dean of Halberstadt and provost of Walbeck. He was made a Knight of the Order of Saint John in 1790 by Prince Augustus Ferdinand of Prussia. In 1797 he was made a Knight of the Prussian Order of the Red Eagle and in 1803, a member of the Order of the Black Eagle.

Among the count's friends were the poets Anna Louisa Karsch and Johann Wilhelm Ludwig Gleim.

== Possessions ==
On 8 June 1765, his maternal great-uncle Count Johann Erdmann of Promnitz left him the Lordships of Pieszyce (German: Peterwaldau), Janowice Wielkie (German: Jannowitz) and Grodztwo (German: Kreppelhof) in Silesia. In a deed of 18 December 1815, he left the Lordship of Pieszyce as special fideicommiss and majorat to his second son, Count Ferdinand, and Janowice Wielkie to his third son, Count Constantine, and Grodztwo to his fourth surviving son, Count Anton. They founded the Silesian branch of the Stolberg-Wernigerode family. They kept their possessions in Silesia until they were expelled in 1945.

In 1804 he inherited the Sovereign Lordship of Gedern from the Princely line of the House of Stolberg (in 1742 Count Frederick Charles of Stolberg-Gedern and all his male-line descendants became Prince of the Holy Roman Empire).

He left the County of Wernigerode to his eldest son, Henry.

== Issue ==
He was married to Countess Auguste Eleonore of Stolberg-Stolberg (10 January 1748 – 12 December 1821), daughter of Count Christoph Louis of Stolberg-Stolberg. They had the following children:

1. Anne (1770–1819), married in 1797 Baron Alexander of Wylich
2. Louise (1771–1856), married in 1807 Maurice Haubold of Schönberg
3. Henry (1772–1854), married in 1799 Princess Jenny of Schönburg-Waldenburg
4. Marie (1774–1810), married in 1803 Prince Henry LIV Reuss of Lobenstein
5. Ferdinand (18 October 1775 – 20 May 1854), married on 25 May 1802 Countess Marie Agnes of Stolberg-Stolberg (daughter of Friedrich Leopold zu Stolberg-Stolberg); their daughter Auguste married Count Rudolph, youngest son of Henry of Stolberg-Wernigerode
6. Friederike (1776–1858), married in 1806 Henry Louis, Burgrave and Count of Dohna-Schlodien
7. Ernestine (1778–1781)
8. Constantine (25 September 1779 – 19 August 1817, Karlsbad), married on 30 September 1804 Baroness Ernestine von der Recke
9. Theodore (1783–1786)
10. Anton (1785–1854), married on 12 June 1809 Baroness Louise von der Recke

Christian Frederick of Stolberg-Wernigerode House of Stolberg Born: 8 January 1746 Died: 26 May 1824
Preceded by Henry Ernest	Count of Stolberg-Wernigerode; 1778-1824	Succeeded by Henry
