= Ilsenburg House =

Coordinates: 51°51′35″N 10°40′43″E

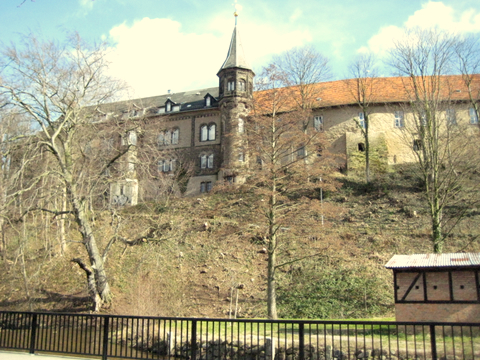
Ilsenburg House showing the so-called Botho building (Bothobau) in 2008

Ilsenburg House (German: Schloss Ilsenburg) stands in the town of Ilsenburg (Harz) in the German state of Saxony-Anhalt and was given its present appearance in the 2nd half of the 19th century. The structure was built from 1860 onwards on the west and north sides of the Romanesque monastery of Ilsenburg Abbey. The stately home, designed in the Neo-Romanesque style, was the seat of the princes of Stolberg-Wernigerode until 1945. Since 2005, it has been owned by the Ilsenburg Abbey Foundation.

In the future it is intended to make use of the house, together with the surviving, medieval cloisters (Klausurgebäude) of the monastery, as an art and cultural centre with overnight accommodation as well as a restaurant open to the public.

== History ==
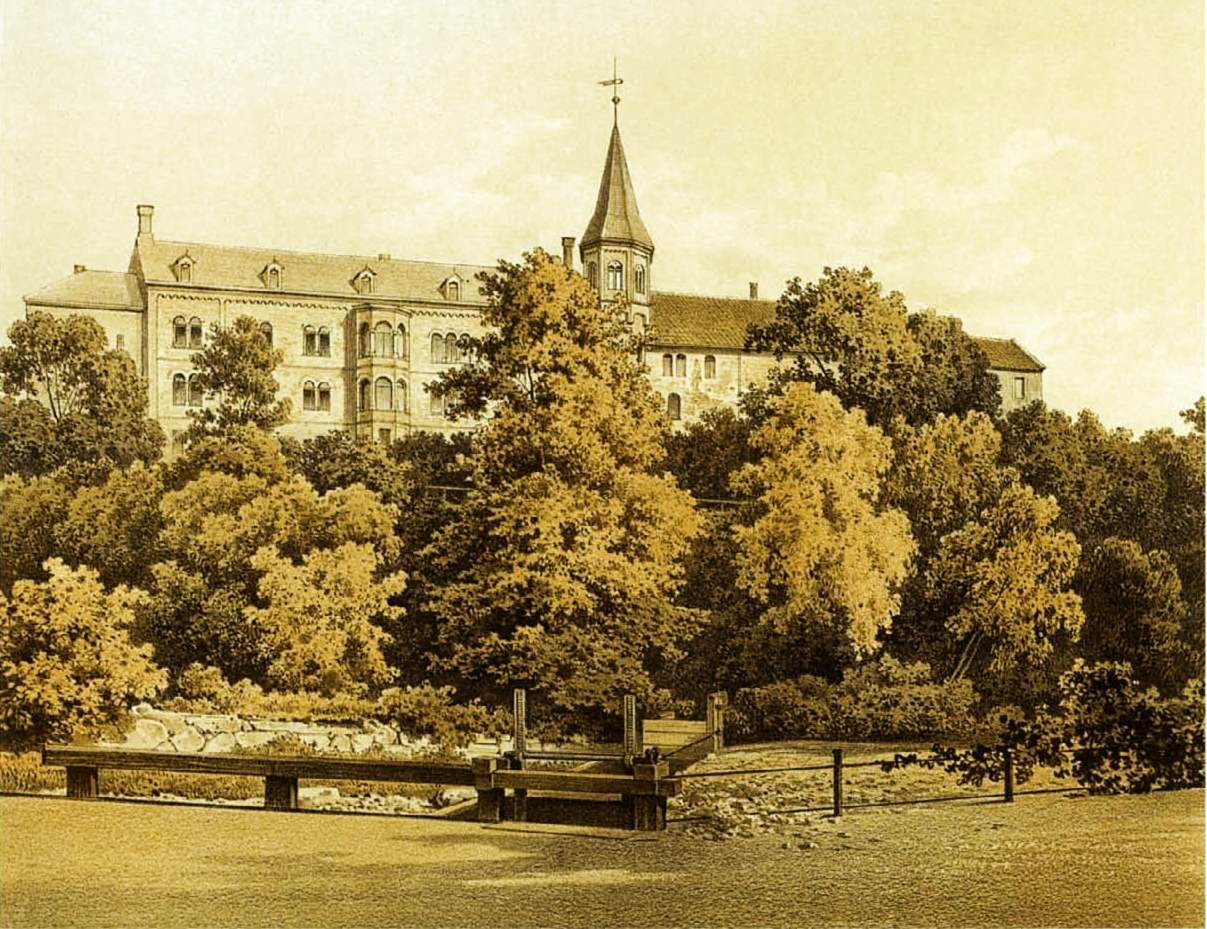
View of the Botho building around 1870, Alexander Duncker collection

The Benedictine monastery in Ilsenburg was closed during the 16th century. The abbey site, including all its estates, were taken over by the counts of Stolberg who had exercised guardianship over the abbey since 1429 when the counts of Wernigerode died out.

The secularised abbey estate was recognised by the prince-elector of Brandenburg, Frederick William I in 1687 as his property. During the 30 Years' War the castle of Wernigerode, occupied by Henry Ernest, had fallen into such a state, that he moved his court to Ilsenburg in September 1648. He moved into the dowager residence on the west side of the former abbey land that had been built between 1609 and 1615 by his cousin, Henry, for his wife, Adriane. Over the next six decades, Henry Ernest and his son, Ernest, ruled their county from the "Comital Stolberg House of Ilsenburg" (Gräflich Stolbergischen Hause Ilsenburg), as the family called the small stately home at that time.

Count Ernest had the former abbey church redesigned around 1700. The high altar, pulpit and the baptismal angel (Taufengel) are examples of fine baroque wood carving and still demonstrate today the skill of the master craftsman who made them. In 1710 the counts of Stolberg-Wernigerode moved their seat back to Wernigerode again. The remaining cloisters were used for various purposes during the succeeding decades and comital officials moved into the surrounding buildings. Between 1861 and 1863 Count Otto of Stolberg-Wernigerode had the building above the Ilse extended as a residence for his uncle, Botho. In doing so, the Romanesque style of the monastic buildings was adopted again. The expansion was led by Karl Frühling, to whom Count Otto had entrusted the conversion of his castle in Wernigerode. From 1897 Ilsenburg was the dowager seat for Princess Anna of Stolberg-Wernigerode and her daughter, Elisabeth.

In 1929 Prince Christian Ernest rented the house, the remains of the former cloisters and the adjacent park for 30 years to the Evangelical Church of the old-Prussian Union. After several renovations, in January 1930 the Ecclesiastical Mission Seminary (Kirchliches Auslandsseminar) began training theologians for mission abroad. Because the seminar was supported by the Confessional Church that resisted Nazification of the Protestant churches, it was dissolved in 1936. That same year the Old Prussian Evangelical Supreme Ecclesiastical Council (Evangelischer Oberkirchenrat, EOK) established a convalescent home for church workers in several of the rooms. Two years later an Evangelical Preaching Seminary was added. During the Second World War the house was also home to a military medical facility for reserves as well as a refugee camp. In May 1945 shortly before the war's end it was plundered and, several months later, the Stolberg-Wernigerode family were dispossessed.

Its new owners, the municipality of Ilsenburg, struck a new agreement for its beneficial use with the Old Prussian Union. In addition to a College of Pastors and an Academy of Singing it also housed, in the years that followed, the Evangelical Academy of Research (Evangelische Forschungsakademie) founded in 1948. With the creation of the exclusion zone around the Inner German Border in 1961, all church activity had to cease and the Stasi took over the whole estate until 1972. From 1974 to 1990 a convalescent home was established in the building for employees of the Ministry for Rural Affairs and Food (Ministerium für Land- und Nahrungsgüterwirtschaft). From 1990 until its purchase by the Ilsenburg Abbey Foundation in 2005 it was used as an hotel.

== Sources ==
- Heinrich Heffter: Otto Fürst zu Stolberg-Wernigerode, T. 1 (= Historische Studien, H. 434), ed. by Werner Pöls, Husum 1980, ISBN 3-7868-1434-1
- Ferdinand Schlingensiepen (ed.): Theologisches Studium im Dritten Reich. Das Kirchliche Auslandsseminar in Ilsenburg/Harz.Düsseldorf 1988. ISBN 3-930250-25-X
- Gottfried Maron: Tausend Jahre Ilsenburg im Spiegel der Geschichte von Kloster und Schloß. Darmstadt 1995, ISBN 3-920606-15-9
- Stadt Ilsenburg (Hg.): 995-1995. 1000 Jahre Ilsenburg/Harz.Ilsenburg/Wernigerode 1995
- Claudia Grahmann: Vom gräflichen Haus zum Schloß Ilsenburg. In: Neue Wernigeröder Zeitung 16/2003

== Garden dreams ==
Ilsenburg Abbey and Palace Garden (Harz) including Ilsenburg House are part of the Saxony-Anhalt Garden Dreams project.
