= Anna of Stolberg-Wernigerode =

- Born: 6 September 1819; Peterwaldau, Prussia (modern Pieszyce, Poland)
- Died: 17 February 1868 (aged 48); Berlin
- Noble family: House of Stolberg
- Father: Anton of Stolberg-Wernigerode
- Mother: Louise von der Recke

Countess Anna of Stolberg-Wernigerode (6 September 1819 – 17 February 1868) was a German noblewoman. She was a deaconess and matron of the Bethanien ("Bethany") hospital in Berlin.

== Life ==
Anna was the eighth child of Count Anton of Stolberg-Wernigerode and his wife, Baroness Louise von der Recke. She was born in Peterswaldau in Silesia. She had a sense of charity even as a child.

In 1834, the family moved to Düsseldorf. In 1834, her parents founded an infant school and in 1836, they founded the first Deaconess Association in the Rhenish-Westphalian area. From 1837 to 1840, the family lived in Magdeburg; then they moved to Berlin.

In Berlin, Anna attended the newly founded deaconess hospital called Bethanien ("Bethany"). In 1854, she became a deaconess and deputy matron. In 1855, she took over management as matron of the hospital. She held this position until her death. She died in 1868, at the age of 48.
