= Henry the Younger of Stolberg =

- Born: 4 January 1467; Stolberg
- Died: 16 December 1508 (aged 41); Cologne
- Noble family: House of Stolberg
- Father: Henry IX of Stolberg
- Mother: Matilda of Mansfeld

Count Henry the Younger of Stolberg (4 January 1467 in Stolberg – 16 December 1508 in Cologne), was Lord of Wernigerode and stadtholder of Friesland.

== Life ==
Henry the Younger of Stolberg was the son of Count Henry IX of Stolberg and his first wife Matilda, the daughter of the Count Volrad of Mansfeld. He had a twin brother Bodo VIII.

His father send his brother Bodo to southern Germany in his early childhood. Henry the Younger, on the other hand, was participating in government business from 1489 onwards. In 1497, when he was 30 years old, his father transferred the reign of the County of Stolberg and the County of Wernigerode to him. Bodo was unhappy and in 1499, their father decided that Bodo and Henry should rule jointly for the next four years.

Henry the Younger had been in the service of Elector Frederick III of Saxony since 1491. In 1493, Henry accompanied Frederick III on a pilgrimage to the Holy Land and was accoladed Knight of the Holy Sepulchre. In 1498, he accompanied Frederick III on a journey to Königsberg, after Frederick had been elected Grand Master of the Teutonic Knights.

On 14 April 1506, Duke George of Saxony appointed him stadtholder of Friesland.

Henry the Younger died in Cologne on 16 December 1508, while travelling.
