= Anton of Stolberg-Wernigerode =

- Born: 23 October 1785; Wernigerode Castle
- Died: 11 February 1854 (aged 68); Berlin
- Noble family: House of Stolberg
- Spouse: Baroness Louise von der Recke
- Father: Christian Frederick of Stolberg-Wernigerode
- Mother: Countess Auguste Eleonore of Stolberg-Stolberg

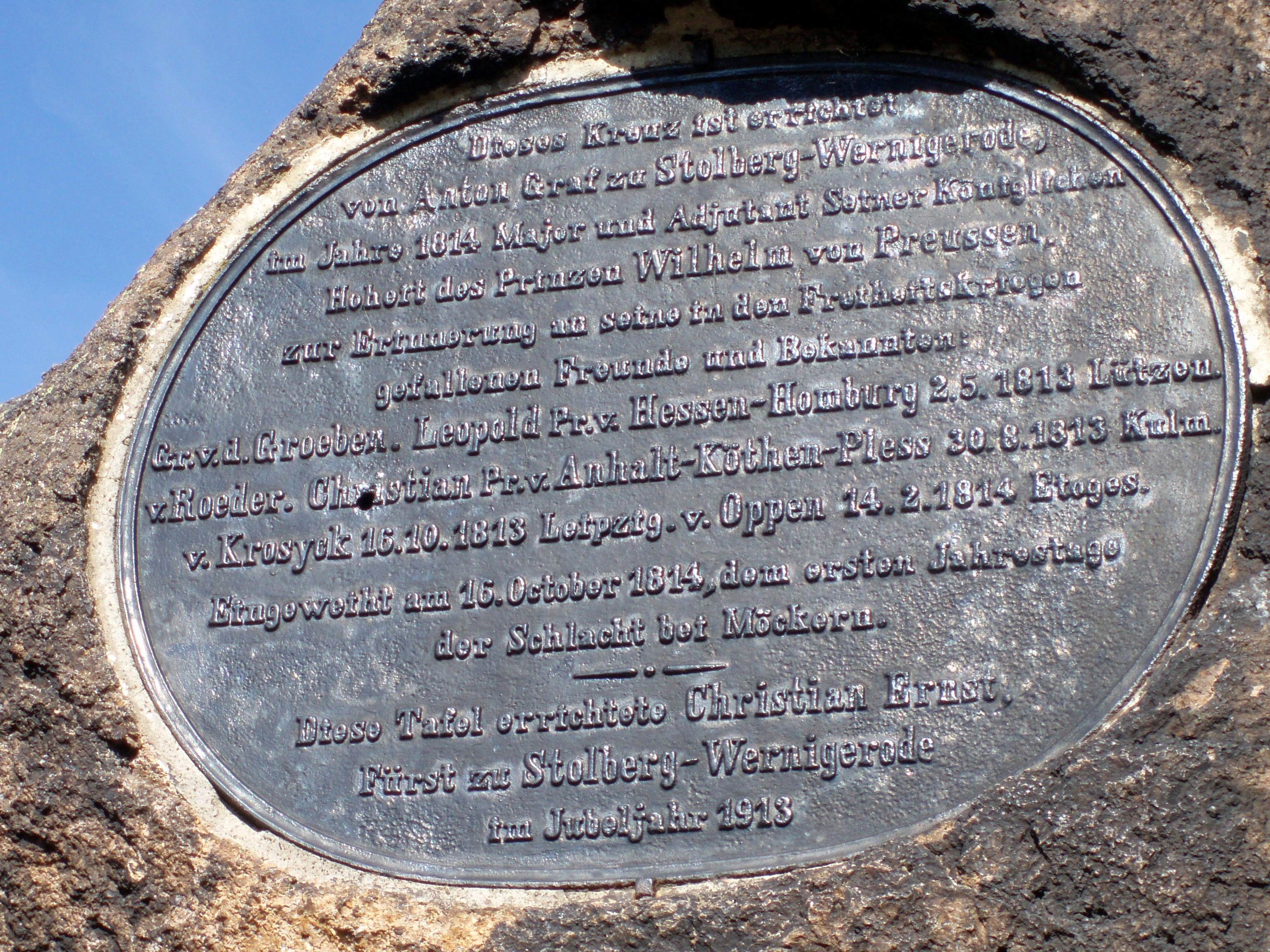
Memorial plaque from 1913 at Ilsestein hill, explaining why Count Anton erected a cross on top of the hill in 1814

Count Anton zu Stolberg-Wernigerode (23 October 1785 − 11 February 1854) was chief minister in Magdeburg, governor in the Prussian Province of Saxony and Prussian Minister of State.

== Life ==
Count Anton was a fourth son of the reigning Count Christian Frederick of Stolberg-Wernigerode and the Countess Auguste Eleonore of Stolberg-Stolberg, he was born at Schloss Wernigerode. He entered into the Prussian military service in 1802. He participated in the Napoleonic Wars part, and was Lieutenant General and commander of the 27th Landwehr Regiment.

On 18 December 1815, his father had transferred the Lordship of Kreppelhof (Grodztwo) in Silesia (today part of Kamienna Góra, Poland) to him in fideicommiss and majorat. This meant that he was not allowed to sell it and it would be owned by him and his descendants in perpetuity and it would be indivisible and inherited according to primogeniture. In 1831, he inherited the Lordship of Diersfordt near Wesel from his brother-in-law Baron Christopher Alexander Charles Frederick von Wylich.

In 1828, he became governor of the Landkreis Landeshut in Silesien. In 1834, he was appointed chief minister in Düsseldorf. In 1837, he was appointed chief minister in Magdeburg as well as governor of the Prussian Province of Saxony. He was made an honorary citizen of Magdeburg in 1841.

In 1840, he was appointed as a confidant of the king Frederick William IV of Prussia. He moved to Berlin and two years later he was appointed as Minister of State. After the March Revolution of 1848, he was forced to resign from this position. He was then adjutant general of the king and in 1851 Minister of the Royal House.

Count Anton died in 1854 and was buried in the cemetery of his family in Wernigerode. The tomb was designed by Friedrich August Stüler.

== Marriage and issue ==
In 1809, Anton married Baroness Louise von der Recke (1787–1874). They had the following children:

- Count Eberhard (1810–1872), succeeded his father as Lord of Kreppelhof, married on 2 May 1819 to Princess Marie of Reuss-Köstritz
- Count Conrad (1811–1851), whose son, Count Udo inherited Kreppelhof in 1872, married 4 Oct 1838 to Baroness Marianne Sophie Eleonore von Romberg
- Count Udo (1812–1826)
- Countess Jenny (1813–1900), married on 12 July 1838 to Count Alexander von Keller (16 Juni 1801 – 30 May 1879)
- Countess Marianne (1815–1844)
- Countess Bertha (1816–1861)
- Countess Elizabeth (1817–1822)
- Countess Anna (1819–1868)
- Countess Charlotte (1821–1885), married on 24 July 1851 to Hans Hugo von Kleist-Retzow (25 November 1814 – 20 May 1892)
- Count Bolko (1823–1884), married on 5 November 1853 to Elisabeth von Thun (22 August 1833 – 6 February 1900)
- Countess Friederike (1824–1848)
- Count Theodore (1827–1902), married on 16 April 1872 to Countess Klara von der Schulenburg (16 December 1849 – 8 May 1936)
