= Bodo VII of Stolberg-Wernigerode =

Bodo VII, Count of Stolberg-Wernigerode
- Born: 1375
- Died: March 15, 1455 (aged 79–80); Stolberg
- Buried: St. Martin's Church in Stolberg
- Noble family: House of Stolberg
- Spouse: Anna of Schwarzburg
- Father: Count Henry of Stolberg
- Mother: Elizabeth of Hohenstein

Count Bodo VII of Stolberg and Wernigerode (1375 – 15 March 1455 in Stolberg), also known as Bodo the Elder, was a German nobleman. He ruled the counties of Stolberg in the southern Harz and Wernigerode in the northern Harz.

== Life ==
Bodo was the son of Count Henry of Stolberg and Elizabeth née Countess of Hohenstein. Nothing is known about his youth. Perhaps he spent some time at a court of the Counts of Schwarzburg, possibly the one in the Sondershausen.

After his father's death, he initially ruled jointly with his elder brother Henry, who died c. 1416. The first time Bodo is mentioned as acting alone, was when he acquired the imperial fief of Resperwenda in 1403.

After the last Count of Wernigerode died in 1429, Bodo acquired the County of Wernigerode in the northern Harz.

One of his most important achievements, was a treaty of inheritance with the Houses of Schwarzburg and Hohnstein in 1433.

Bodo died on 15 March 1455 and was buried on 17 March in the crypt of the St. Martin's Church in Stolberg.

== Marriage and issue ==
In June 1431, at the age of 50, Count Bodo married Anna, the daughter of Count Henry of Schwarzburg, who bore him two children:

- Henry, born in 1433, succeeded Bodo as Count of Stolberg and Wernigerode
- Elizabeth, born in 1434, married William II of Brunswick-Calenberg-Göttingen
