= Saxon war =

Saxon war, Saxon revolt or Saxon rebellion may refer to:

- War of the Saxon Federates, part of the Anglo-Saxon settlement of Britain around AD 500
- Saxon Wars (772–804), a series of wars between the Saxons and the Franks under Charlemagne
- Saxon revolt of 1073–1075, a rebellion against Emperor Henry IV
- Saxon revolt of 1077–1088, a rebellion against Emperor Henry IV during the Investiture Contest
- Saxon War, an episode in the Nibelungenlied
