= Henry Ernest, Count of Stolberg =

- Born: 20 July 1593; Schwarza
- Died: 4 April 1672 (aged 78); Ilsenburg
- Noble family: Stolberg
- Spouse: Anna Elisabeth of Stolberg-Ortenberg

Henry Ernest, Count of Stolberg (20 July 1593 in Schwarza – 4 April 1672 in Ilsenburg) was a German nobleman. He was the founder of the older main line of the House of Stolberg.

He was the eldest son of Count Christopher II of Stolberg. From 1639 to 1645, Henry Ernst and his younger brother John Martin jointly ruled the County of Stolberg. On 31 May 1645, they divided their inheritance, with Henry Ernest receiving the County of Wernigerode and Hohnsteiner Forest. He moved the residence of his county from Wernigerode to Ilsenburg.

On 2 May 1649, he married Anna Elisabeth, a daughter of Count Henry Volrad of Stolberg-Ortenberg. They had two sons, Ernest and Louis Christian, and one daughter, Anna Eleonore, who married Emmanuel, Prince of Anhalt-Köthen in Ilsenburg on 23 March 1670.

As there was no primogeniture in Stolberg, his sons jointly inherited the county when Henry Ernest died in 1672.
