= Ernest, Count of Stolberg-Ilsenburg =

- Born: 25 March 1650; Ilsenburg
- Died: 9 November 1710 (aged 60); Ilsenburg
- Buried: 21 December 1710; Castle church at Ilsenburg
- Noble family: House of Stolberg
- Spouse: Sophia Dorothea of Schwarzburg-Arnstadt
- Father: Henry Ernest
- Mother: Anna Elsiabeth of Stolberg

Ernest, Count of Stolberg-Ilsenburg (25 March 1650 in Ilsenburg – 9 November 1710 in Ilsenburg) was a German nobleman. He was an imperial count and the ruling Count of Königstein, Rochefort, Wernigerode and Hohnstein, as well as Lord of Eppstein, Münzenberg, Breuberg, Agimont, Lohra and Klettenberg

He was the son of Count Henry Ernest of Stolberg and his wife Anna Elisabeth. On 10 June 1672, he married Sophia Dorothea of Schwarzburg-Arnstadt (8 June 1647 – 26 April 1708). His two sons died in infancy. His only daughter, Sophia Elizabeth, survived him. She married a Prince of Reuss-Untergreiz.

Ernest died on 9 November 1710. He was buried in the castle church at Ilsenburg on 21 December 1710. Since he had no male heir, his possessions fell to his nephew Christian Ernest of Stolberg-Wernigerode. In his will, he left 1000 Taler to a charitable trust, which had been created when his wife left 500 Taler in her will. This trust fund was known as the Greizer Bequest; it supported the poor and those in need in the County of Wernigerode until 1931.
