= Stolberg-Wernigerode =

County of Stolberg-Wernigerode Grafschaft Stolberg-Wernigerode
- 1645–1807
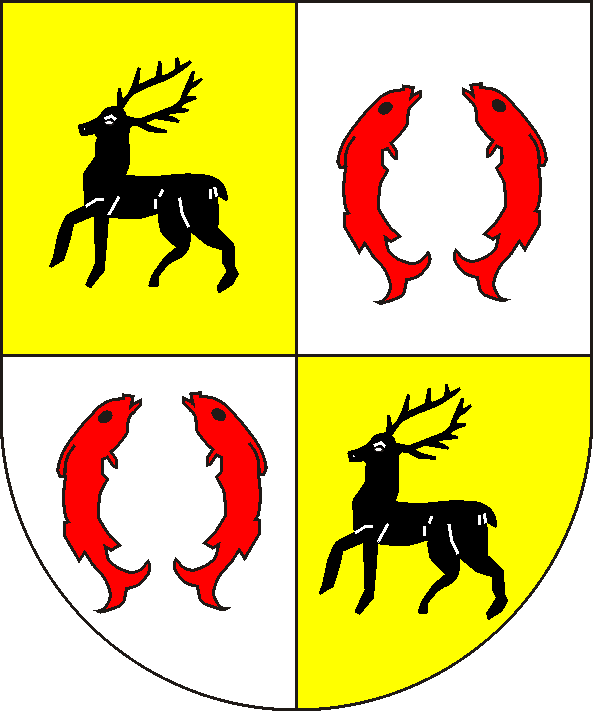
- Coat of arms
- Status: State of the Holy Roman Empire (until 1806)
- Capital: Wernigerode
- Government: County
- Historical era: Middle Ages
  - Wernigerode inherited by counts of Stolberg: 1429
  - Partitioned from Stolberg-Stolberg: 1645
  - Partitioned to create Stolberg-Gedern: 1677
  - Under Vogterei of Prussia: 1714
  - Acquired Stolberg-Schwarza: 1748
  - Reacquired Stolberg-Gedern: 1804
  - Mediatised to Westphalia: 1807
  - Awarded to Prussia: 1815
Preceded by	Succeeded by
Stolberg-Stolberg	Kingdom of Westphalia

The County of Stolberg-Wernigerode (German: Grafschaft Stolberg-Wernigerode) was a county of the Holy Roman Empire located in the Harz region around Wernigerode, now part of Saxony-Anhalt, Germany. It was ruled by a branch of the House of Stolberg.

== History ==
The Counts of Wernigerode had become extinct in 1429 and their lands were inherited through Salic law by the Counts of Stolberg, sovereign counts of the Empire since the early 11th century. On 31 May 1645, the Harz line of Stolberg-Stolberg was divided between a senior Stolberg-Wernigerode line and a junior Stolberg-Stolberg line. Because Wernigerode was heavily damaged by the Thirty Years' War, the Counts of Stolberg-Wernigerode also resided in the castle of Ilsenburg.

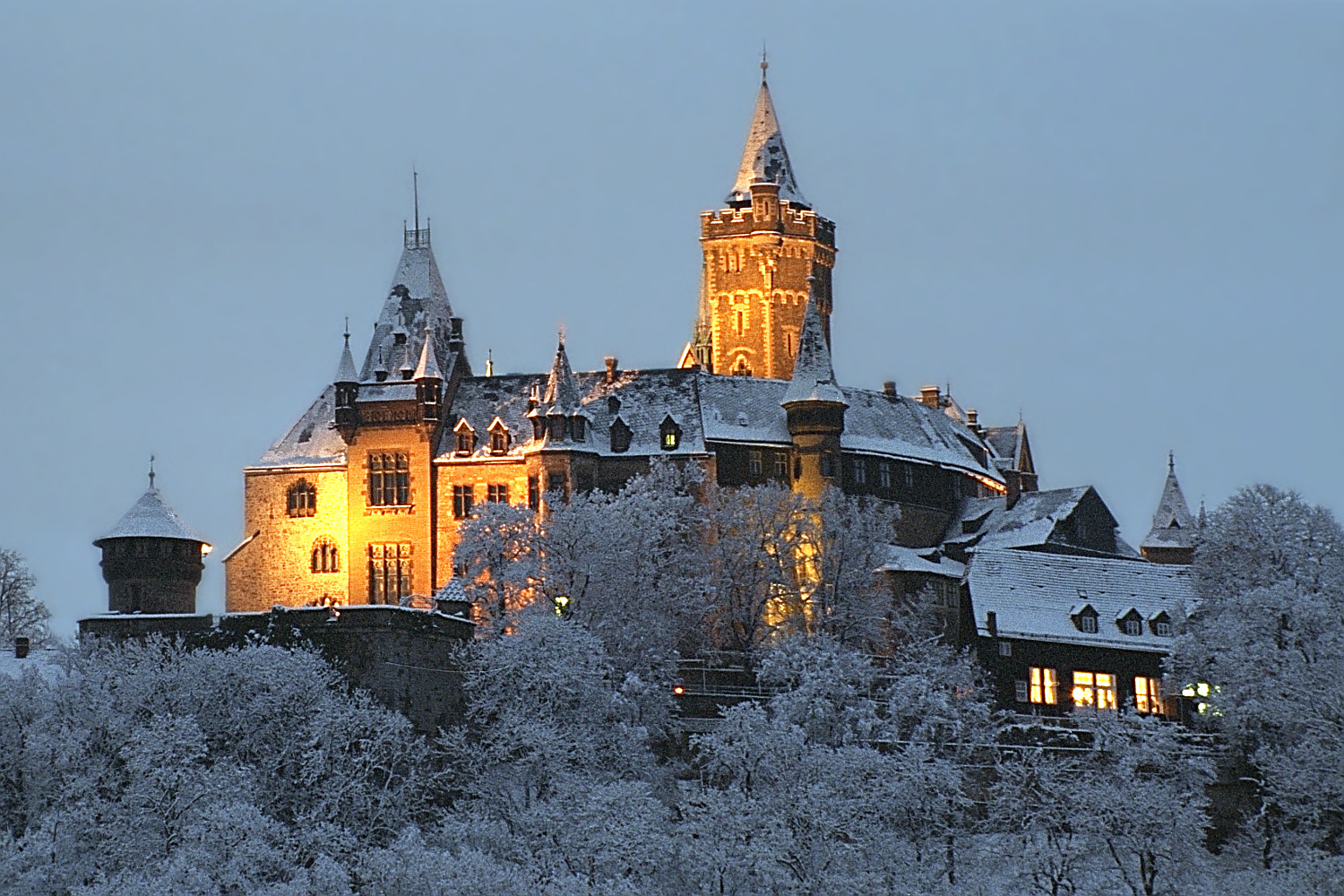
Wernigerode Castle

The town of Gedern in Hesse, acquired in 1535, became the seat of the cadet branch of Stolberg-Gedern in 1677. This junior line, raised to an imperial principality by Emperor Charles VII of Wittelsbach in 1742, was reacquired by Stolberg-Wernigerode in 1804. The Wernigerode line also re-acquired Stolberg-Schwarza on 14 September 1748.

In 1714, Count Christian Ernest surrendered his military and the fiscal independence of Stolberg-Wernigerode to King Frederick William I of Prussia, although he still maintained subordinated rule over his territories as a count. The county was mediatised in 1807 and made part of the Kingdom of Westphalia. In the 1815 Congress of Vienna, Stolberg-Wernigerode was granted to Prussia, although successive counts retained sovereign rights until 1876. The territory was incorporated into the Prussian Province of Saxony in 1815.

The Counts of Stolberg-Wernigerode were considered Reichsfrei. The children of Fürsten, Fürstinnen and Erbprinzen (Princes and Princesses) zu Stolberg-Wernigerode bore the title of Prince(ss) zu Stolberg-Wernigerode and were styled as Serene Highness. Other members of this line bore the equal title of Graf/Gräfin zu Stolberg-Wernigerode (not to be confused with ordinary Counts) and were styled as Illustrious Highness.

== Rulers of Stolberg-Wernigerode ==
=== Counts of Stolberg-Wernigerode ===
- Henry Ernest, 1645-1672
- Ernest, son, 1672-1710
- Christian Ernest, nephew, 1710-1771
- Henry Ernest, son, 1771-1778
- Christian Frederick, son, 1778-1824
- Henry, son, 1824-1854
- Otto, grandson, 1854–1896, Vice-Chancellor of Germany, Fürst from 1890 on

=== Princes of Stolberg-Wernigerode ===
- Otto, 1st Prince 1890-1896 (1837-1896) - Vice-Chancellor of Germany, Fürst from 1890 on
  - Christian Ernst, 2nd Prince 1896-1940 (1864-1940)
    - Botho, 3rd Prince 1940-1989 (1893-1989)
      - Christian-Heinrich, 4th Prince 1989-2001 (1922-2001)
        - Prince Ludwig-Christian (b.1958)
        - Prince Bolko (b.1959)
          - Princess Natasia (b.1992)
        - Philipp, 5th Prince 2001-present (b.1967)
          - Carl, Hereditary Prince of Stolberg-Wernigerode (b.2009/10)
        - Prince George (b.1970)
          - Prince Tassilo (b.2005)
          - Prince Nikolas (b.2007)
      - Prince Elger (b.1935)
        - Prince Alexander (b.1967) - adopted by Stolberg-Roßla line

== See also ==
- House of Stolberg
