= Grodztwo, Włocławek County =

Grodztwo
- Village
- Location within Poland
- Coordinates: 52°32′17″N 19°09′45″E
- Country: Poland
- Voivodeship: Kuyavian-Pomeranian
- County: Włocławek
- Gmina: Kowal

Grodztwo [ˈɡrɔt͡stfɔ] is a village in the administrative district of Gmina Kowal, within Włocławek County, Kuyavian-Pomeranian Voivodeship, in north-central Poland.
