= Drübeck Abbey =

Coordinates: 51°51′21″N 10°42′53″E

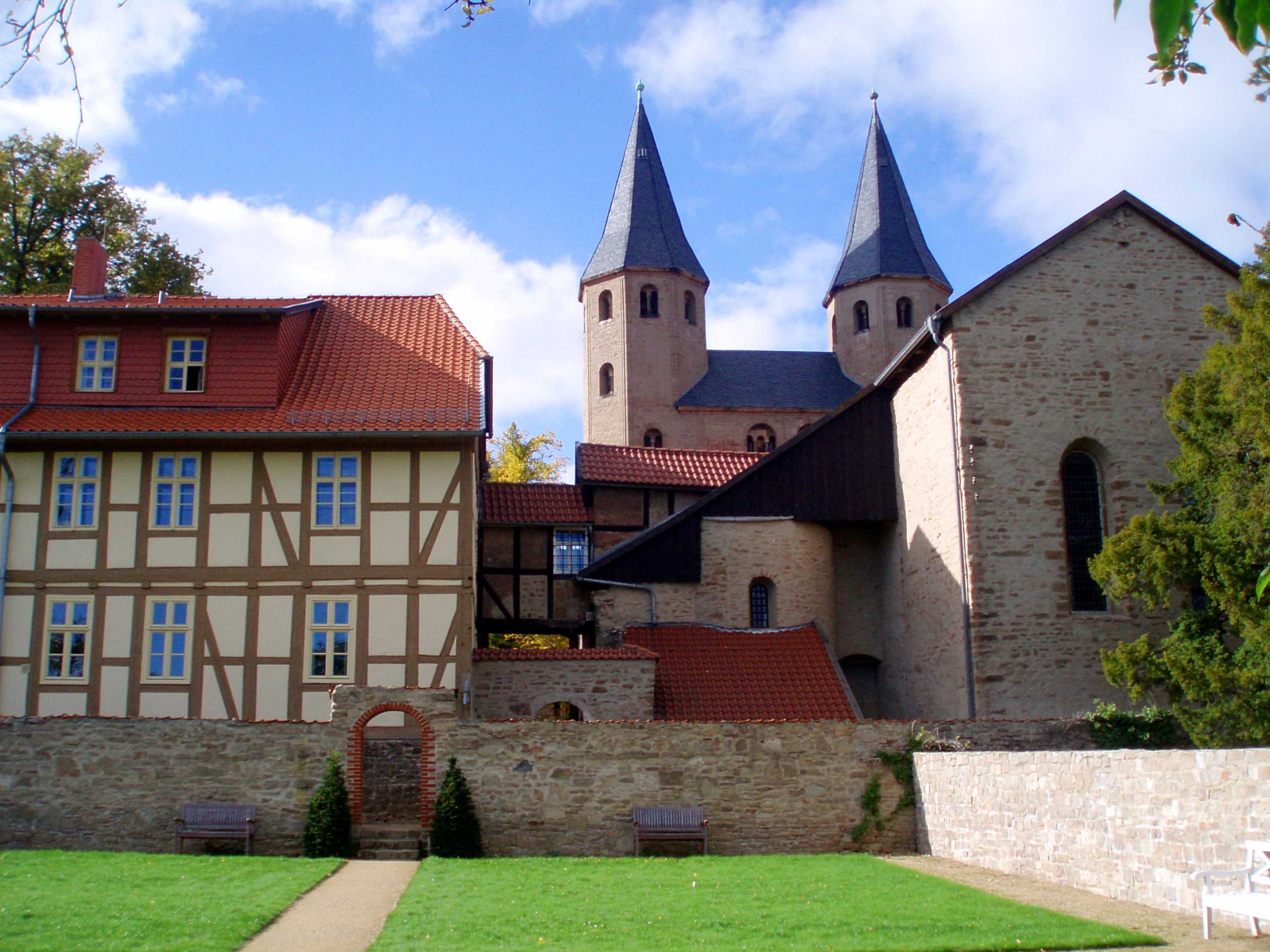
Autumn at Drübeck Abbey

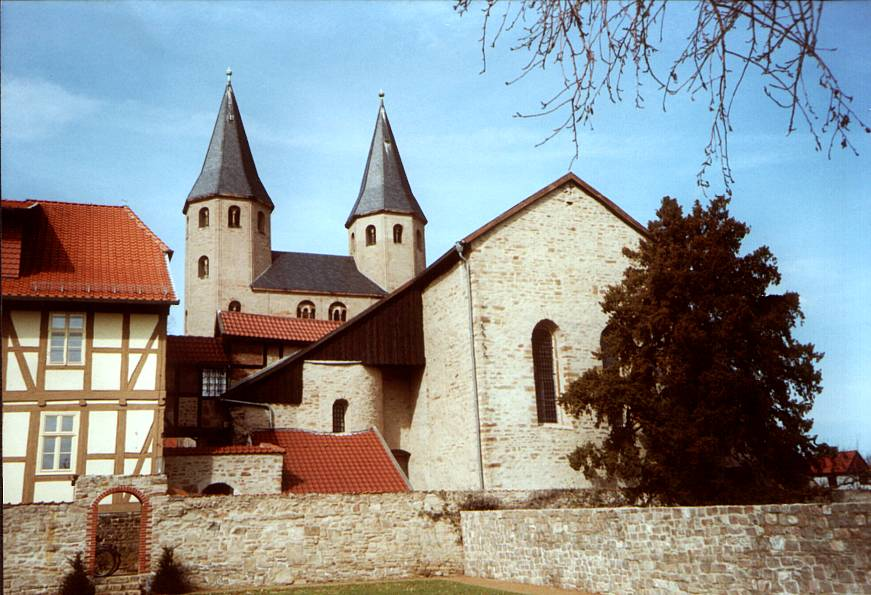
Spring at Drübeck Abbey

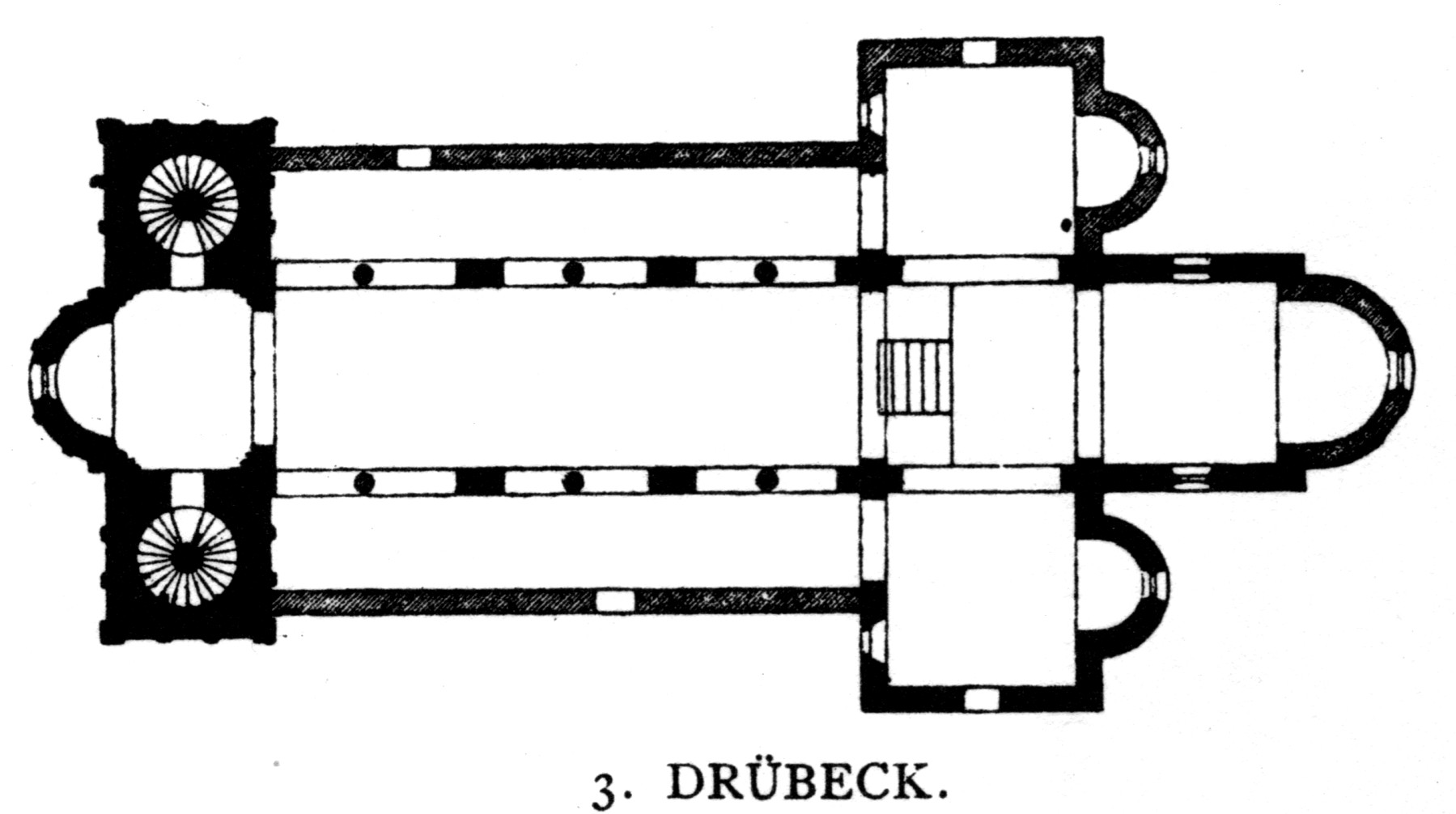
Plan of the 12th century abbey church

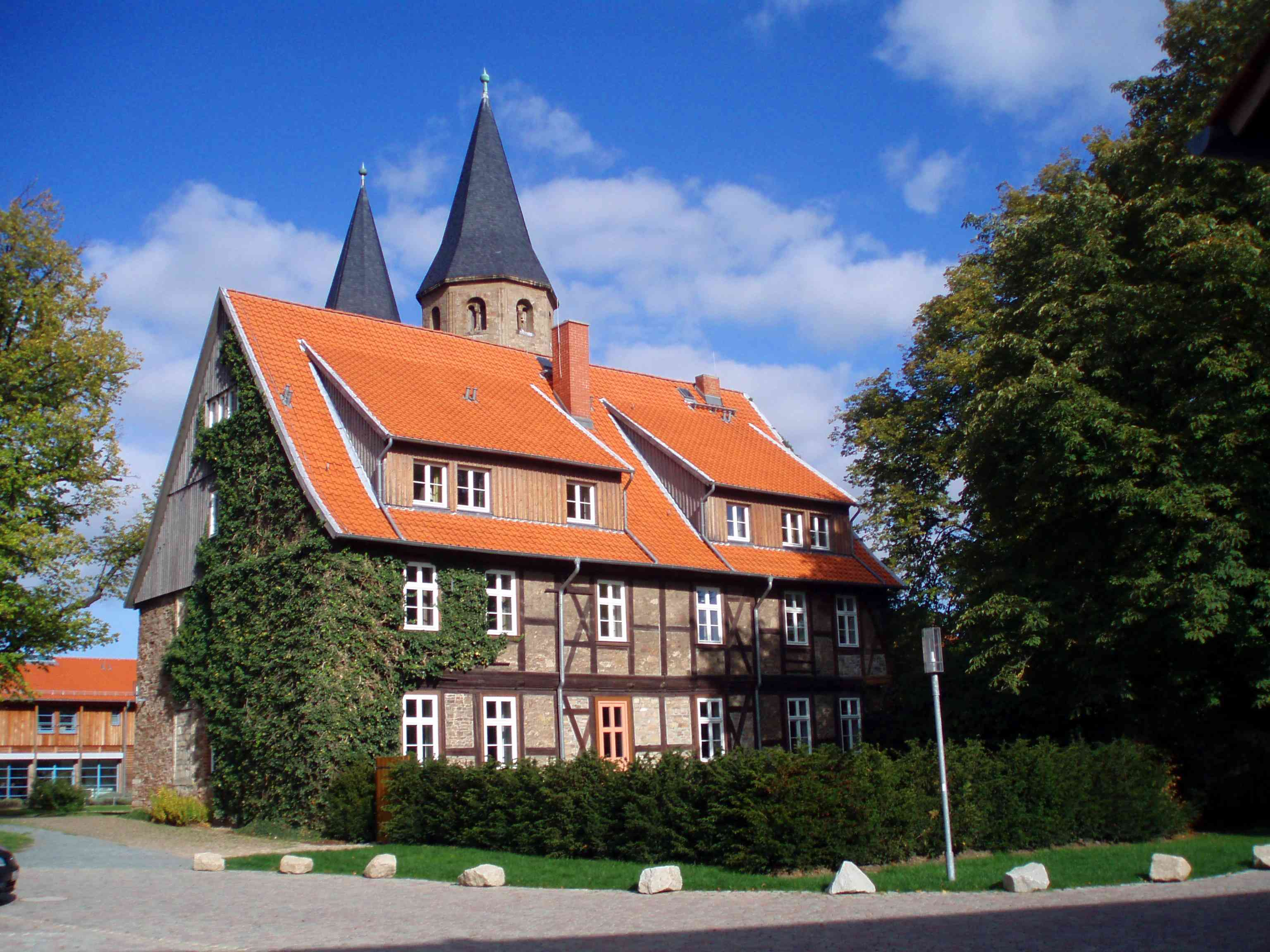
House of Silence

Drübeck Abbey (German: Kloster Drübeck) is a former Benedictine monastery for nuns in Drübeck on the northern edge of the Harz in the German state of Saxony-Anhalt. Today it is a conference venue for the Evangelical Church of the Church Province of Saxony with an educational-theological institute and pastoral centre.

== History ==
The Abbey of Drübeck was supposedly mentioned for the first time in a document dated 26 January 877. However, this has been exposed as a forgery. Thus a deed by the Holy Roman Emperor Otto I, dated 10 September 960, is seen as the first confirmed record of the Drubechi Abbey.

In 995, Emperor Otto III confirmed the election of "free" abbesses (German: Äbtissinnenwahl) (i.e., without imperial or episcopal oversight) and thus the special legal position of the abbey. This meant that during the 10th century the foundation enjoyed privileges like those of the Imperial Abbeys (German: Reichsabteien) in Gandersheim and Quedlinburg.

During the turmoil of the Protestant Reformation, the German Peasants' War and the Thirty Years War, monastic life died out. At the end of the 17th century the abbey buildings were transferred to the Counts of Stolberg-Wernigerode, who established an evangelical convent there in 1732. At the request of the last abbess, Countess Magdalena of Stolberg-Wernigerode, the Evangelical Church Province of Saxony took over the abbey in 1946 as a convalescent home and conference centre.

== Construction ==
The earliest record of its construction dates to 1 August 1004. From a deed signed by Emperor Henry II it emerges that either a new monastery was erected or a major renovation had taken place. It was designed as a flat-roofed church with three double bays and simple alternation of piers and columns (Stützenwechsel) in the nave. Even today the walls of the central nave, five columns with Ottonian capitals and the southern wing of the transept retain this structure.

In very recent times new excavations have taken place, which have revealed the northern aisle that had been lost around 1660, as well as part of an angular foundation in the area of the transept. This could have belonged to a previous building.

In the 12th century extensive modifications were carried out: the imposing west transom with its two towers was built, the church was arched and the tiered stalls added. During the peasants' war the building was badly damaged. In 1599 a fire was started by a band of robbers, whose ringleader was never captured. After makeshift repairs, more modifications were carried out during the Baroque era.

In the 20th century attempts have been made to recover the original structure in places and the crypt was re-opened to its halfway point. The abbey buildings are part of the Romanesque Road, a tourist route in Saxony-Anhalt.

== Grave slab of St. Adelbrin (d. ca. 900) ==
Adelbrin was the legendary first abbess of the monastery. The non-contemporary grave monument is preserved in the crypt of the church which is accessible from the outside. It is sandstone grave slab engraved with figures and leaning against a wall. The narrow side leans on a plain grave slab. Adelbrin was the legendary founder of the abbey and a saint. She is believed to be the sister of the two founders of the abbey, Theti and Wikker.

== Gardens ==
The abbey gardens are part of the Saxony-Anhalt Garden Dreams project. The present external area was recreated in Anhalt based on a plan drawn by J. A. Dieckmann in 1737. Following the abbey's acquisition at that time by the Counts of Stolberg-Wernigerode, the courtyard and gardens were relaid. As part of this the convent gardens with their prayer houses and the abbess's gardens were established; these remain part of the garden scenery even today.

Around 1730, as part of this renovation, a lime tree was planted in the abbey courtyard. This "abbey lime" - almost 300 years old - is now a natural monument for the district of Harz.

== Sources ==
- Eduard Jacobs: Urkundenbuch des in der Grafschaft Wernigerode belegenen Klosters Drübeck vom Jahr 877 – 1594 Halle, Verlag d. Buchhandlung d. Waisenhauses, 1874 (= Geschichtsquellen der Provinz Sachsen and angrenzender Gebiete, Bd. 5)
- Gartenträume - Historische Parks in Sachsen-Anhalt, Denkmalpflegerisches and touristisches Gesamtkonzept sowie infrastrukturelle Rahmenplanung, Magdeburg – Rehsen 2001 (PDF-File; 2,16 MB)
- Berent Schwineköper (Hrsg.): Provinz Sachsen Anhalt. In: Handbuch der Historischen Stätten Deutschlands. Band 11, Stuttgart 1987, ISBN 3-520-31402-9
- Annett Laube-Rosenpflanzer; Lutz Rosenpflanzer: Kirchen, Klöster, Königshöfe : vorromanische Architektur zwischen Weser and Elbe, S. 147ff., Halle 2007, ISBN 3-89812-499-1
