= Henry of Stolberg-Wernigerode =

Ruling Count of the County of Wernigerode (1772–1854)

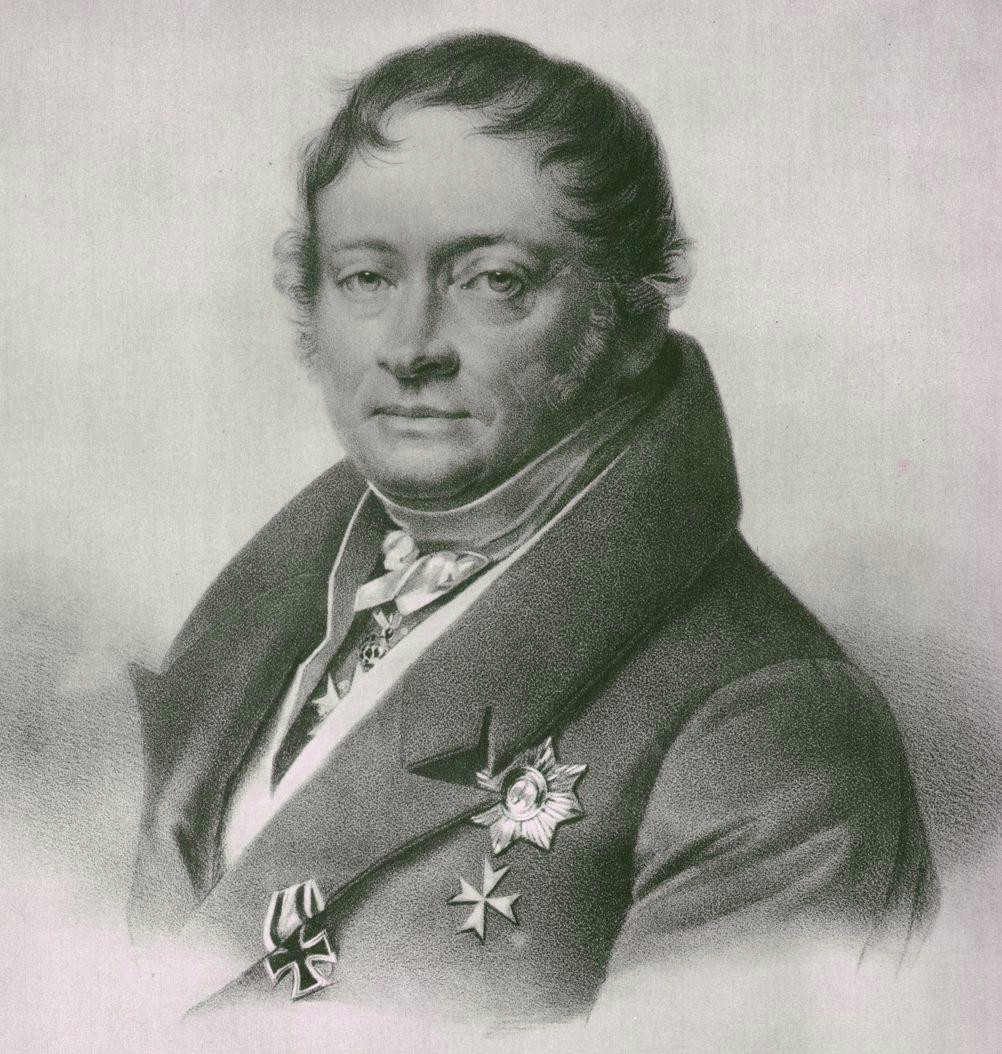
- Count Henry of Stolberg-Wernigerode
- Born: 5 September 1772; Wernigerode Castle
- Died: 16 February 1854 (aged 81); Wernigerode Castle
- Spouses: Princess Johanna of Schönburg-Waldenburg; Baroness Eberhardine von der Reck
- Father: Christian Frederick of Stolberg-Wernigerode
- Mother: Countess Auguste Eleonore of Stolberg-Stolberg

Count Henry of Stolberg-Wernigerode (25 September 1772 in Wernigerode Castle – 16 February 1854 in Wernigerode Castle) succeeded his father in 1824 as ruler of the County of Wernigerode.

== Life ==
By birth, member of an ancient House of Stolberg, Henry was born as the eldest son of Count Christian Frederick of Stolberg-Wernigerode (1746–1824) and his wife, Countess Auguste Eleonore of Stolberg-Stolberg (1748–1821).

Henrich zu Stolberg-Wernigerode was educated by private tutors and studied until 1790 (with an interruption in 1789 by the turmoil of revolution) in Strasbourg. He then continued his studies in Göttingen. After completing his studies, he devoted himself to the administration of his territories. After his attempts to prevent the mediatization of his house as part of Reichsdeputationshauptschluss had failed, he sided with Napoléon Bonaparte, and became Oberstallmeister in the Kingdom of Westphalia. From 1808 to 1813 he was a member of the Diet the Kingdom of Westphalia.

From 1813 to 1815, he served the General Government between the Weser and the Rhine as administrator of the district of Osterwieck (the General Government was a temporary province of Prussia, to administer the territories that had been liberated from French occupation during the War of the Sixth Coalition). During the Congress of Vienna, all of the territories of the County of Stolberg were awarded to count Henry.

From 1825 he was a member of the Prussian State Council. From 1825 to 1854 he was also a member of the provincial Council of the Prussian Province of Saxony; from 1847 to 1848 he was a member of the United Diet of the Prussian provinces. From 1824 to 1854, he ruled over the county of Wernigerode in the district of Magdeburg of the Prussian province of Saxony. As a nobleman, he was a hereditary member of the First Chamber of the States General in the Kingdom of Hanover and also in the Grand Duchy of Hesse. Count Henry was canon of Halberstadt Cathedral, Knight of the Prussian Royal Order of the Black Eagle and a member of the Order of Saint John.

In 1853 he purchased the House Bruch, a manor near Hattingen. The Henrichshütte factory in Hattingen was named after him. This factory started operations in 1854, the year Henry died.

== Marriages and issue ==
On 4 August 1799 he married his first wife, Princess Johanna Jenny von Schönburg-Waldenburg (4 October 1780–29. August 1809), daughter of Prince Otto Karl Friedrich of Schönburg-Waldenburg (1758–1800) and his wife, Countess Henriette Eleonore Elisabeth Reuss of Köstritz (1755–1829). They had:

- Countess Eleonore (1801–1827), married in 1819 Prince Henry LXIII, Prince Reuss of Köstritz
- Hermann (1802–1841), Count of Stolberg-Wernigerode, married in 1831 Emma Countess of Erbach-Fürstenau (1811–1889, great-granddaughter of George Albert III, Count of Erbach-Fürstenau); their child was Otto of Stolberg-Wernigerode, first Prince (Fürst) of Stolberg-Wernigerode and Vice-Chancellor of Germany
- Count Bernhard (1803–1824)
- Count Botho (1805–1881), married in 1843 Countess Adelheid of Erbach-Fürstenau (1822–1881, sister of the aforementioned Emma)
- Countess Caroline (1806–1899), married in 1828 Prince Henry LXIII, Prince Reuss of Köstritz
- Count Eduard and Count Christoph (twins; 1808-1808)
- Count Rudolph (1809–1867), married in 1851 Auguste Countess of Stolberg-Wernigerode (1823–1864)

On 30 December 1810, he married his second wife, Baroness Eberhardine von der Recke (1785–1852), the daughter of the Prussian State Minister Eberhard Freiherr von der Recke (1744–1818) and his wife, Baroness Elise Dorothea Luise Vincke (1763–1838).

Henry of Stolberg-Wernigerode House of Stolberg Born: 25 September 1772 Died: 16 February 1854
Preceded by Christian Frederick	Count of Stolberg-Wernigerode; 1824–1854	Succeeded by Otto
