= Otto Graf zu Stolberg-Wernigerode =

Vice-Chancellor of Germany (1837–1896)

Otto zu Stolberg-Wernigerode
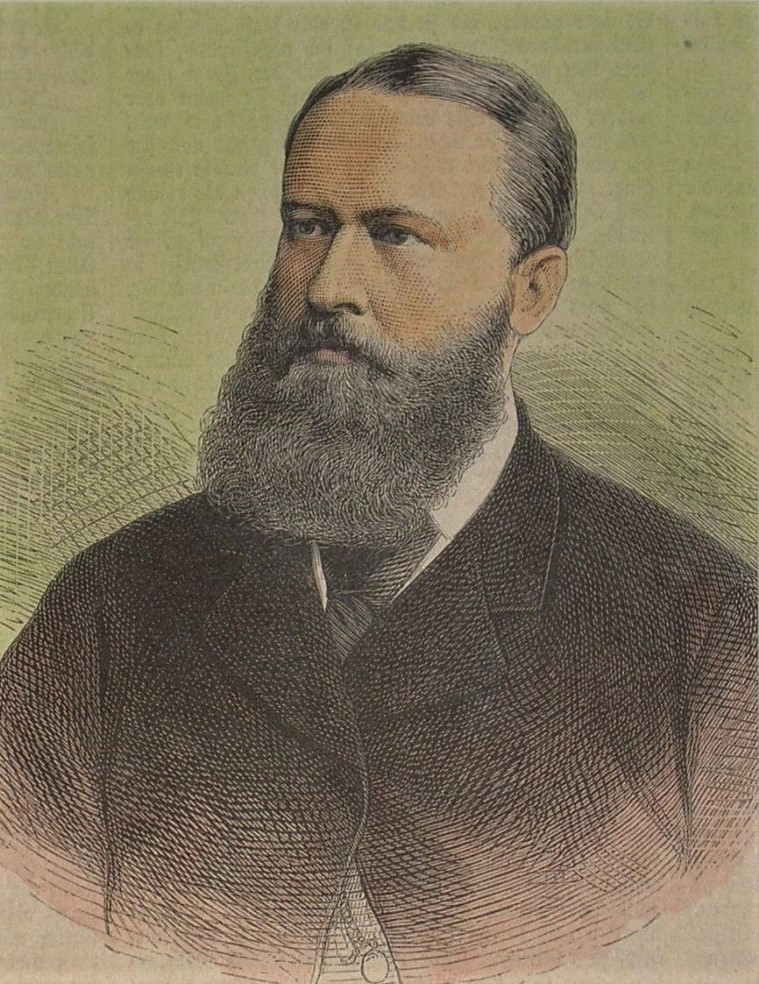
- Partially colored wood engraving, 1876

Vice-Chancellor of Germany
- In office 1 June 1878 – 20 June 1881
- Chancellor: Otto von Bismarck
- Preceded by: Position established
- Succeeded by: Karl Heinrich von Boetticher

Member of the Reichstag (German Empire)
- In office 1871–1878
- Constituency: Hannover 13 (1877-1878); Hannover 5 (1871-1877)

(North German Confederation)
- In office 24 February 1867 – 17 April 1867
- Constituency: Magdeburg 8

Personal details
- Born: 30 October 1837 Gedern, Grand Duchy of Hesse
- Died: 19 November 1896 (aged 59) Wernigerode, Province of Saxony
- Party: Free Conservative
- Spouse: Anna Reuss of Köstritz
- Occupation: Officer, diplomat, politician

Military service
- Allegiance: Prussia, German Empire

Otto Graf (From 1890, Fürst) zu Stolberg-Wernigerode (30 October 1837 – 19 November 1896) was an Imperial German officer, diplomat and politician who served as the first vice-chancellor of the German Empire under Otto Von Bismarck between 1878 and 1881.

== Life ==
He was born at Gedern Castle, Hesse, the third and last child of Count Hermann zu Stolberg-Wernigerode (1802–1841, himself a son of Henry of Stolberg-Wernigerode) and his wife Countess Emma zu Erbach-Fürstenau (great-granddaughter of George Albert III, Count of Erbach-Fürstenau). The ancient noble House of Stolberg had been quasi-sovereign rulers of their County of Stolberg-Wernigerode until the German Mediatisation, when they came under the jurisdiction of Prussia in 1815. His elder brother Albert (Albrecht) died, when he was four years old, his father died shortly afterwards from grief over the loss.

Having been schooled in Duisburg, he read law and administration science at the universities of Göttingen and Heidelberg. Between 1859 and 1861, he served as a cavalry officer in the Gardes du Corps regiment of the Prussian Army. Stolberg had his Wernigerode Castle residence rebuilt in a lavish Gründerzeit style. In 1867 he was appointed as Oberpräsident of the Prussian Province of Hanover at the instigation of Minister-president Otto von Bismarck.

Stolberg endeavoured to integrate the annexed province into the Prussian state. Having served in the North German Reichstag from 1867 to 1871, he became a member of the Free Conservative Party and thereafter had a seat in both the German Reichstag and the Prussian House of Lords (as its president from 1872). In March 1876 he became German ambassador in Austria-Hungary, again on Bismarck's proposal.

In 1878, he was appointed German Vice-Chancellor under Chancellor Bismarck. Stolberg was instrumental in the development of the Dual Alliance with Austria which was concluded in Autumn 1879. He also supported Bismarck's Anti-Socialist Laws, however, over time had more and more differences with the Chancellor and finally resigned from office in 1881. Stolberg remained an active politician, serving as Prussian treasurer and Minister of the Royal House. In 1890 he was granted the hereditary title of Prince (Fürst in German) by Emperor Wilhelm II.

Stolberg died at Wernigerode Castle, aged 59.

== Marriage and issue ==
On 22 August 1863 at Staniszów Castle, he married his cousin Anna Reuss of Köstritz (1837–1907). They had the following children:

- Christian Ernest (1864–1940), Prince of Stolberg-Wernigerode

married in 1891 Countess Marie of Castell-Rüdenhausen (1864-1942), daughter of Wolfgang, 1st Prince of Castell-Rüdenhausen (1830-1913) and Princess Emma of Ysenburg and Büdingen in Büdingen (1841-1926).

- Elizabeth (1866–1928)

married in 1885 Count Constantin of Stolberg-Wernigerode (1843-1905), son of Count Wilhelm of Stolberg-Wernigerode (1807-1898) and Countess Elisabeth of Stolberg-Rossla (1817-1896).

- Hermann (1867–1913)

married in 1910 Princess Dorothea of Solms-Hohensolms-Lich (1883-1942), daughter of Hermann of Solms-Hohensolms-Lich

- William (1870–1932)

married in 1910 Princess Elizabeth of Erbach-Schönberg (1883-1966), daughter of Gustav Ernst, Prince of Erbach-Schönberg (1840-1908) and Princess Marie of Battenberg (1852-1923).

- Henry (1871–1874)
- Marie (1872–1950)

married in 1902 Count Wilhelm of Solms-Laubach (1861-1936), son of Friedrich of Solms-Laubach (1833-1900)

- Emma (1875–1956)

married in 1894 Prince Charles of Solms-Hohensolms-Lich (1866-1920)

== Honours and awards ==
- Kingdom of Prussia:
  - Knight of Honour of the Johanniter Order, 1859; Commander, 1867
  - Knight's Cross of the Royal House Order of Hohenzollern, with Swords and Johanniter Cross on White Band, 1867; Grand Commander's Cross with Swords on Ring, 1873; with Star, 17 June 1881
  - Iron Cross (1870), 2nd Class on White Band
  - Grand Cross of the Red Eagle, with Oak Leaves, 11 June 1879; with Crown, 12 June 1892
  - Knight of the Black Eagle
- Oldenburg: Grand Cross of the Order of Duke Peter Friedrich Ludwig, with Golden Crown, 16 June 1869
- Grand Duchy of Hesse:
  - Grand Cross of the Merit Order of Philip the Magnanimous, with Swords, 17 October 1877
  - Grand Cross of the Ludwig Order, 12 September 1880
  - Knight of the Golden Lion, 4 May 1888
- (Austrian Empire) (Kingdom of Hungary) Austria-Hungary: Grand Cross of the Royal Hungarian Order of St. Stephen, 1878
- Duchy of Anhalt: Grand Cross of the Order of Albert the Bear, 1882
- (Saxe-Coburg and Gotha) (Duchy of Saxe-Altenburg) (Saxe-Meiningen) Ernestine duchies: Grand Cross of the Saxe-Ernestine House Order, 1882
- Kingdom of Bavaria: Grand Cross of Merit of the Bavarian Crown, 1886
- Baden:
  - Knight of the Order of Berthold the First, 1887
  - Knight of the House Order of Fidelity, 1888
- Brunswick: Grand Cross of the Order of Henry the Lion, 1887
- (Kingdom of Hanover) Hanoverian Royal Family: Commander of the Royal Guelphic Order, 1st Class
- Mecklenburg: Grand Cross of the Wendish Crown, with Crown in Ore
- Kingdom of Saxony: Grand Cross of the Albert Order
- Netherlands: Grand Cross of the Netherlands Lion
- Kingdom of Romania: Grand Cross of the Star of Romania
- Russian Empire: Knight of St. Alexander Nevsky, in Diamonds
- Württemberg: Grand Cross of the Württemberg Crown, 1892

Otto Graf zu Stolberg-Wernigerode House of Stolberg Born: 30 October 1837 Died: 19 November 1896
Preceded by Henry	Count (from 1890: Prince) of Stolberg-Wernigerode; 1854–1896	Succeeded by Christian Ernest
Political offices
Preceded by Office created	Vice-Chancellor of Germany; 1878–1881	Succeeded by Karl Heinrich von Boetticher
