= Wernigerode Castle =

Castle in Saxony-Anhalt, Germany

Coordinates: 51°49′49″N 10°47′42″E

- Schloss Wernigerode
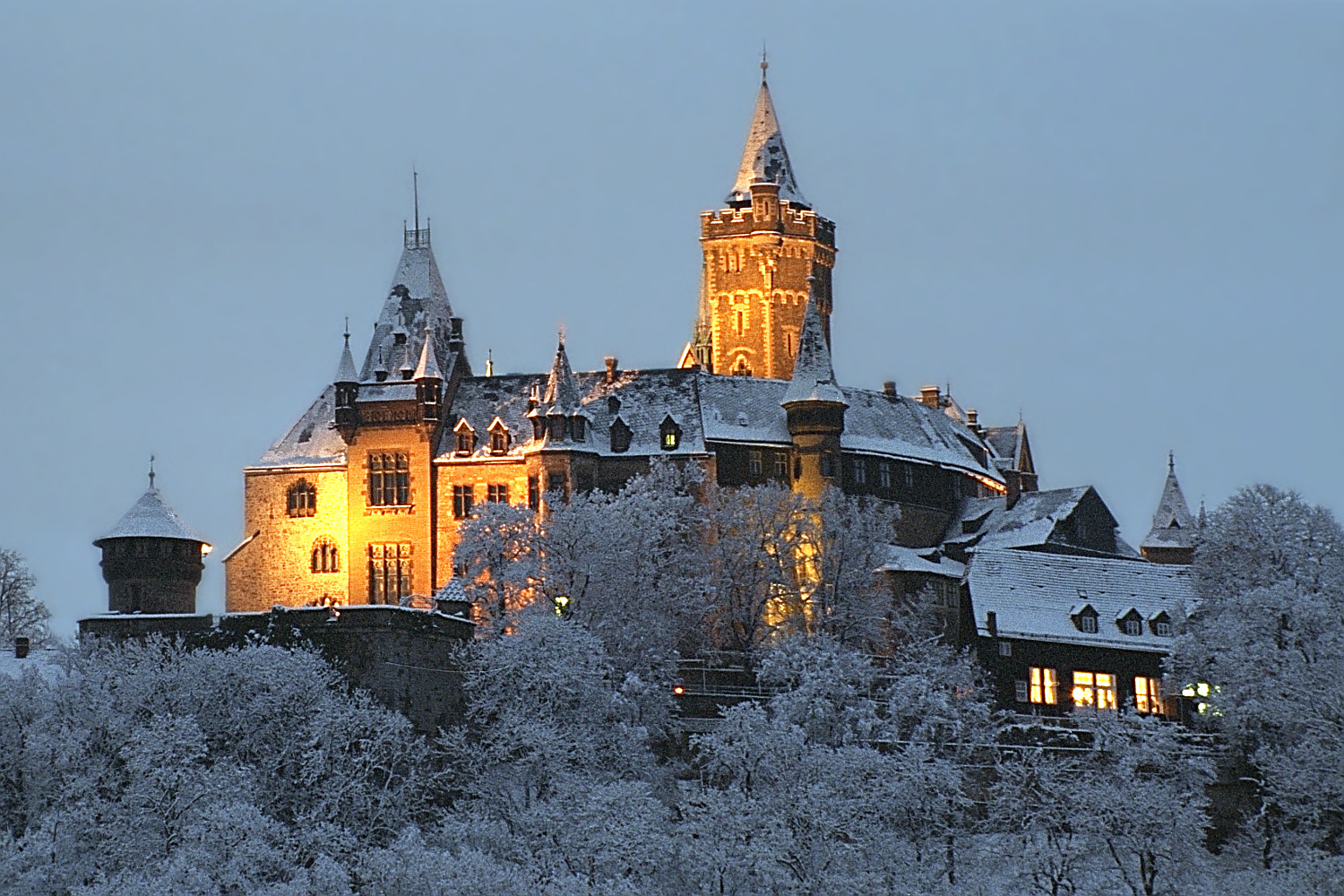
- Wernigerode Castle in winter

- Location within Saxony-Anhalt

General information
- Location: Am Schloß 1, 38855 Wernigerode, Germany, Wernigerode, Germany
- Construction stopped: 19th century

Wernigerode Castle (German: Schloss Wernigerode) is a schloss located in the Harz mountains above the town of Wernigerode in Saxony-Anhalt, Germany. The present-day building, finished in the late 19th century, is similar in style to Schloss Neuschwanstein, though its foundations are much older and have been reconstructed several times. Wernigerode Castle was first built at the beginning of the 12th century (1110-1120) as a Romanesque architecture medieval fortress for German emperors to have a secure spot to stop during their hunting trips to the Harz. Few of these medieval walls and foundation remain today. At the end of the 15th century the castle was enlarged in a Gothic architecture style, with large arched windows. During the 16th century, it was rebuilt as a Renaissance fortress. A spiral staircase tower still remains intact today.

== History ==
The first mention of the Saxon noble Adalbert of Haimar, Count of Wernigerode, in an 1121 deed is also the first documentation of the settlement, which had been founded about a century earlier in connection with the deforestation of the area. The counts built the castle on a slope south of the town as their residence; it was first mentioned as a castrum in 1213. When the line became extinct in 1429, the Wernigerode lands were inherited by the neighbouring County of Stolberg. The castle became the seat of the subordinate Amt administration and was put in pledge several times.

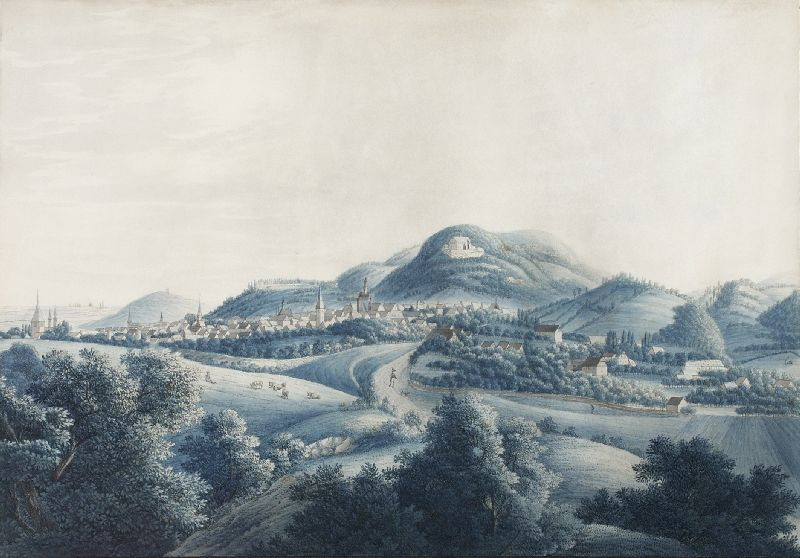
Wernigerode town and schloss, about 1820

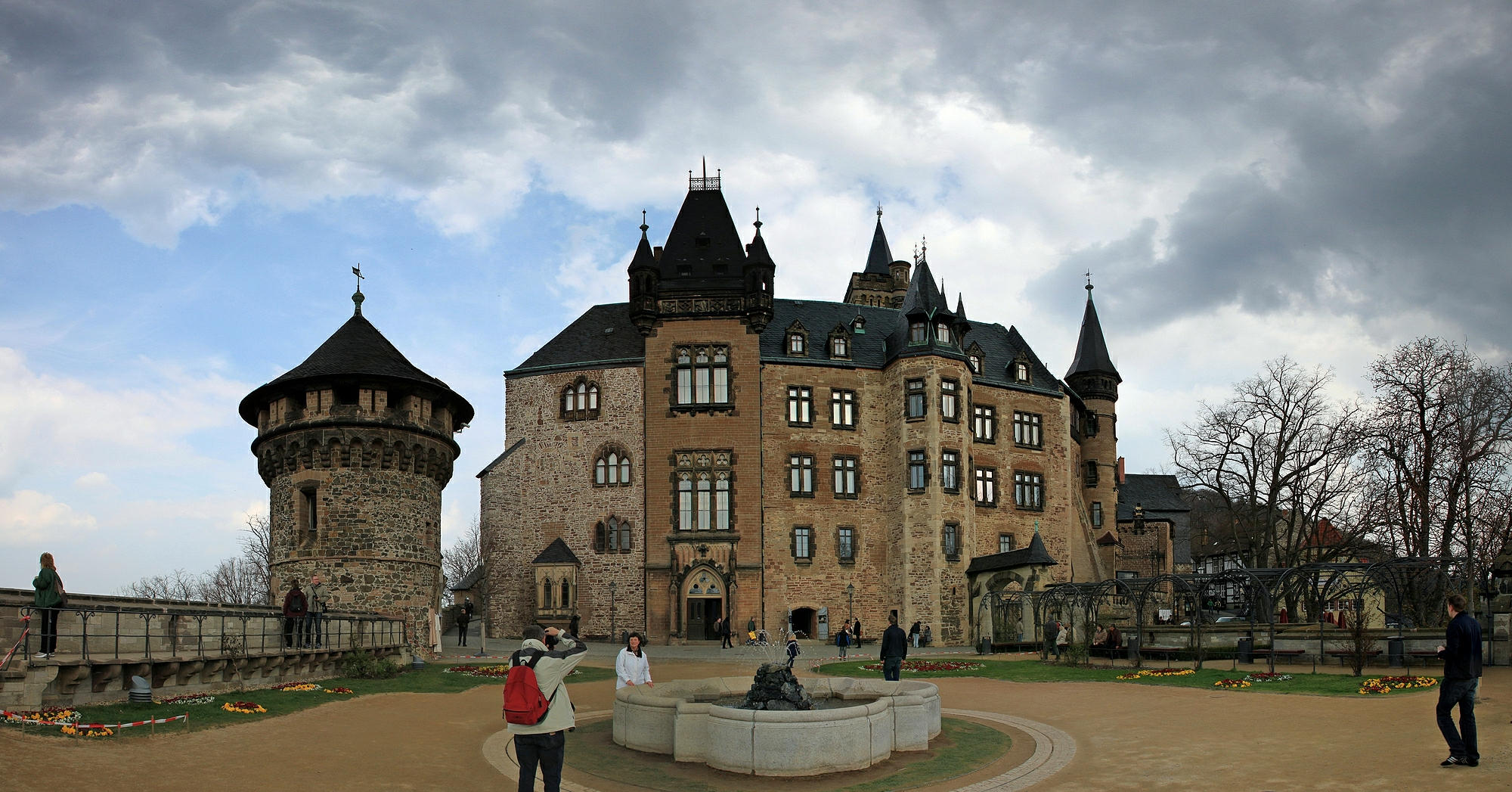
View of the Burghof

When in 1645 the Stolberg-Stolberg line split, Wernigerode again became the capital of the County of Stolberg-Wernigerode. The counts however struggled with the citizens in the course of the Thirty Years' War and had to take their residence at nearby Ilsenburg House. The castle was also heavily damaged during this war. It was not until 1710 that Count Christian Ernest could relocate the seat of government back to Wernigerode, when he had the castle rebuilt as a schloss in a Baroque style. He ruled for 61 years, though he had to accept the overlordship of King Frederick William I of Prussia in 1714.

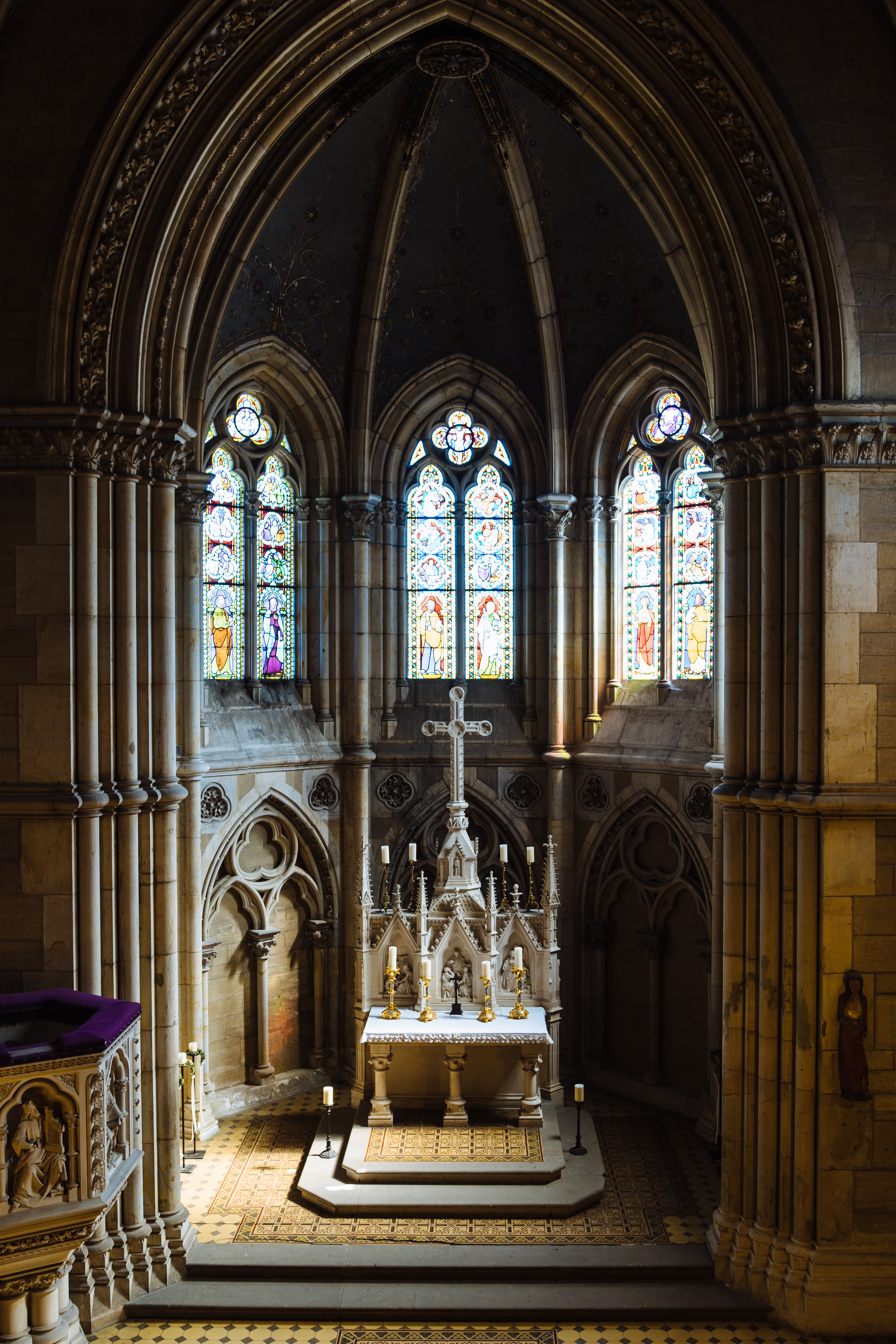
The castle chapel St. Pantaleon und Anna

Christian Ernest's descendant Count Otto, first president of the Prussian Province of Hanover from 1867, president of the Prussian House of Lords from 1872 and German Vice-Chancellor from 1878, had the schloss again extensively rebuilt in a Neo-Romantic half timber and half stone, style known as historicism, finishing the project in 1893. Later when Otto became German ambassador the castle became a representation of North-German historicism. The entire complex includes a chapel built in 1880 by German architect Carl Frühling according to drafts by the renowned Vienna architect Friedrich von Schmidt. The original chapel was inaugurated in honor of patron saint Panthaleon and St. Anna and it was situated on the north-western part of the castle circle. Its baroque shape remained unchanged until its demolition in 1870. The new chapel is located in the same location as the old chapel and was inaugurated in 1883. The historic hall is decorated with built-in galleries, while the choir is decorated with stained glass designed by artist Carl Christian Andrea.
