= Klagt, Kinder, klagt es aller Welt, BWV 244a =

Bach cantata

Köthener Trauermusik
- BWV 1143 · 244a
- Secular cantata by J. S. Bach
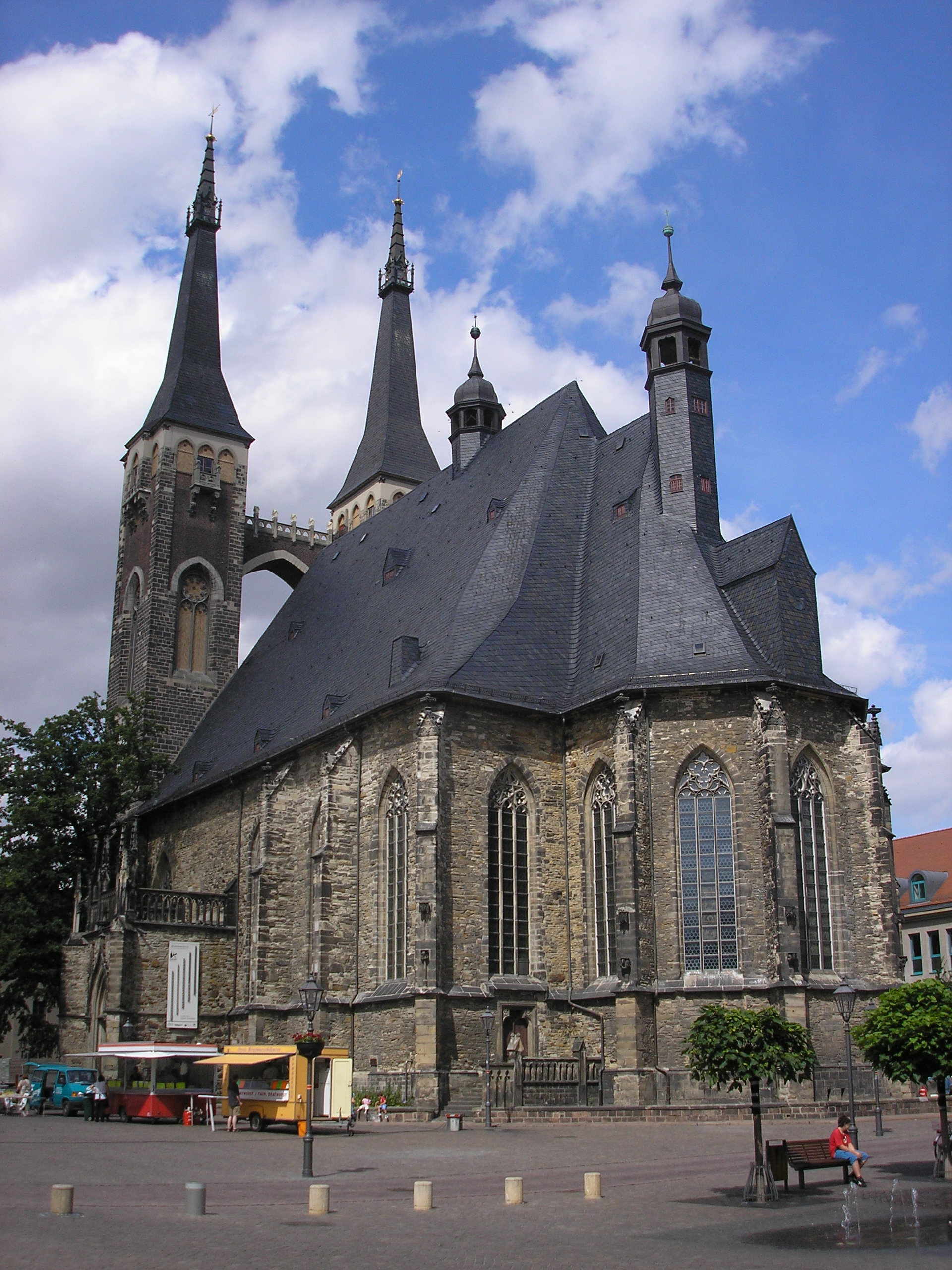
- St. Jakob, Köthen
- Related: based on movements from St Matthew Passion and BWV 198
- Occasion: Funeral
- Cantata text: Picander
- Performed: 23 March 1729: Köthen
- Movements: 24 in four parts

Klagt, Kinder, klagt es aller Welt ('Cry, children, cry to all the world'), also known as Köthener Trauermusik ('Köthen funeral music'), BWV 1143, BWV 244a, is a cantata by Johann Sebastian Bach. He composed it in 1729 for the funeral of Leopold, Prince of Anhalt-Köthen. The music is lost, but the libretto survives. As Bach is known to have used musical material which also appeared in two surviving works, one being the St Matthew Passion, it has been possible to make reconstructions.

The cantata is in 24 movements (choruses, arias and recitatives) divided into four parts. The first deals with the principality in mourning, the second the prince's departure and the salvation of his soul. The third part, followed by a homily, details Leopold's commemoration. The final section is about the farewell and about eternal rest.

== History and words ==
The choice of Bach for the funeral music was not surprising. He had worked full-time at Leopold's court between 1717 and 1723. When he moved to Leipzig, he retained his role as Köthen court composer. His commissions in the period 1723–29 included the 1726 secular cantata Steigt freudig in die Luft, BWV 36a, to celebrate the birthday of Princess Charlotte, Leopold's wife, who was to survive the deaths of her husband and two children from smallpox.

Although the prince's death took place in 1728, his funeral was delayed until March of the following year. Presumably the delay in burying the prince gave Bach a reasonable amount of time to compose the Trauermusik (funeral music). However, he chose to adapt material he had already composed, rather than create something completely new. While no score survives for the cantata as such, there is evidence of how Bach set the text, which was by Picander, a librettist Bach had been working with since his move to Leipzig. It has been demonstrated that Bach used music from an earlier funeral ode (to a text by Johann Christoph Gottsched) and music from the St Matthew Passion (to a text by Picander), which "fit" the words of the funeral text. (see Reconstructions section below)

Picander's text for the funeral music exists in three different versions.

== Performance history ==
=== First performance ===
The court at Köthen and St James' church in Bach's time were Calvinist and therefore not usually a venue for elaborate music.

On 23 March 1729 the prince's body was transferred from the court chapel to the crypt of St James' church where the ornate casket rests to this day. There is documentary evidence that the cantata was performed at a memorial service the following day, but it has been suggested by Andrew Parrott that part of the cantata would have been appropriate for the burial service. There is also documentary evidence regarding the performers, which throws light on the scoring. The composer's wife, Anna Magdalena Bach, was the soprano soloist and Christian Ferdinand Abel was probably a soloist on viola da gamba.

=== Reconstructions ===
The possibility of a reconstruction arose when the nineteenth-century scholar Wilhelm Rust discovered that Bach in part built the Trauermusik with movements from two other works:

- the Trauer-Ode for the Electress of Saxony Laß, Fürstin, laß noch einen Strahl, BWV 198
- the St Matthew Passion

Bach sometimes reused an earlier composition, typically revising and improving it in a process called parody. Exactly how Bach recycled his music in this case is open to interpretation. However, Bach may have simply given his musicians music sheets from the existing works to save copying another set.

The close relationship between the Passion and the Trauermusik for Prince Leopold is reflected in their sharing a number in the Bach-Werke-Verzeichnis (BWV), the standard catalogue of Bach's works. However, the relationship is complicated by the fact that, although the first performance of the Passion appears to predate the Trauermusik, the Passion was revised by Bach for later performances.

Several reconstructions exist:

- Polish musicologist Władysław Gnat reconstructed in 1999 all parts except recitatives, which were to be performed by a speaker. The performance took place on 24 March 1999 (the 270th anniversary of original performance) in the Franciscan Church in Poznań, Poland with the Arte dei Suonatori baroque orchestra, led by Marcin Sompoliński.
- The German musicologist Hans Grüß reconstructed in 2000 all arias and most of the choruses. In this version the text of the recitatives has to be performed by a speaker.
- The first complete reconstruction was made by Andrew Parrott and first performed under his direction by the New York Collegium in 2004. Six years later Parrott made a recording of this edition with the UK-based Taverner Consort and Players (see recording section below).
- The German harpsichordist Alexander Ferdinand Grychtolik made an edition of another full reconstruction of the Trauermusik in 2010. In this version most of the recitatives of the Trauermusik are adapted from accompagnato recitatives of the St Matthew Passion. This reconstruction is based on the assumption of German musicologist Detlef Gojowy that there is a parody connection not only between arias and choruses, but also between the accompagnato recitatives of both works. Grychtolik made a recording of his version with his ensemble Deutsche Hofmusik in 2015, published by Deutsche Harmonia Mundi (Sony).

== Recordings ==
There exist two recordings of the cantata.

J.S. Bach Trauer-Music: 'Music to mourn Prince Leopold, Avie Records, 2011

- Soloists: Emily Van Evera (soprano), Clare Wilkinson (mezzo), Charles Daniels (tenor) and Tom Meglioranza (baritone)
- Taverner Consort and Players
- Andrew Parrott

Köthener Trauermusik BWV 244a, Harmonia Mundi, 2014

- Soloists: Sabine Devieilhe (soprano), Damien Guillon (alto), Thomas Hobbs (tenor), Christian M. Immler (bass)
- Pygmalion
- Raphaël Pichon

== Film ==
An aria from the Trauermusik was used in the 1968 film The Chronicle of Anna Magdalena Bach. The piece in question is "Mit Freuden sei die Welt verlassen" (music lost, reconstructed from St Matthew Passion, BWV 244, "Aus Liebe will mein Heiland sterben")
