= Wilhelm von Rath =

Wilhelm von Rath (1585 – 27 April 1641) was a German scholar and a military officer. His name, in the dative case (after "von"), may be rendered as "Rathen".

== Biography ==
Rath was born in Klein-Wülknitz, Anhalt, and came from an old noble family. His parents were Hans von Rath and his wife, Anna Voigt. Rath enjoyed a Protestant education and was registered at the University of Leipzig starting the summer of 1601. But he eventually left academia for a career in the military, the high point of which was Rath's appointment as the kriegskommissar, the officer appointed to handle financial matters under Prince Ludwig I of Anhalt-Köthen. Rath was married to Dorothea von Hackeborn, who bore him a son, Balthasar Wilhelm von Rath, in 1629.

In the service of Ludwig I throughout the Thirty Years' War until his death, he was appointed commander of the cavalry (January 10, 1627). In recognition of his military professionalism, Ludwig called him “rough” and “tough” when admitting him to the Fruchtbringende Gesellschaft, a society dedicated to the standardization of German.

Rath distinguished himself with his cavalry at the Battle of Breitenfeld (1631) in the Swedish-Protestant victory against the Imperial Catholic troops. He was known for his battle cry, an earlier and more poetic version of “When things get tough, the tough get going":

Wan das rauhe ist dahin
So die iugent mit sich bringet:
Endert sich der gantze sinn,
Und dan nach dem himmel ringet.

== Personal life ==
Wilhelm was married to Dorothea von Hackeborn (1608 - 1667), daughter of Dietrich von Hackeborn-Sülldorf and Bahrendorf (1550 - 1617) and his wife, Anna von Werdensleben (1565 - 1639). They had a son and a daughter:

- Balthasar Wilhelm von Rath (* 22 March 1629; † 22 November 1695) ⚭ Magdalene Barbara von Wuthenau (* 16 April 1629; † 16 January 1694)
  - Sophie Magdalene von Rath (1666 - 1666)
  - Gisela Agnes of Rath, Duchess regent of Anhalt-Köthen ⚭ Emmanuel Lebrecht, Prince of Anhalt-Köthen
  - Leopold von Rath
- Magaretha Giesela von Rath (* 21 June 1627; † 17. November 1692) ⚭ Mathias von Lattorff (* 16 September 1619; † 19 February 1666)

== Death ==
Rath was killed by war-time marauders near Wieskau, Anhalt-Köthen.
