= St. Jakob, Köthen =

Coordinates: 51°45′04″N 11°58′25″E

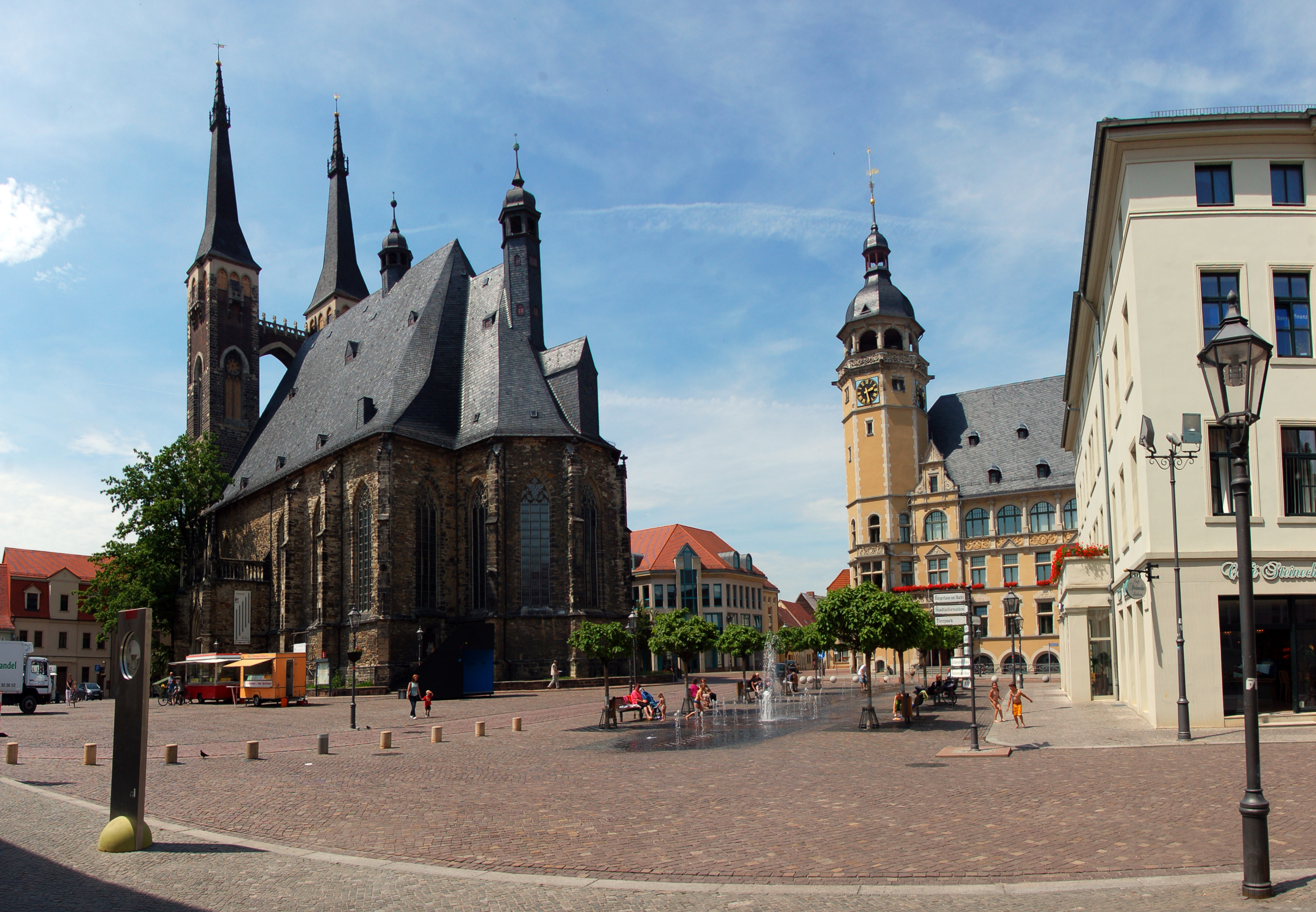
The church in 2010

St. Jakob (St. James's) is the name of the now Protestant church and parish within the Church of Anhalt in the city of Köthen, Anhalt, Germany. Constructed around 1400, the church is built in the Gothic style. Since 1525 the parish has been Protestant. The reformer Johann Schlaginhaufen was a minister from 1533 until his death in 1560. The building was restored and partly remodeled in the second half of the 19th century.

The church holds the Fürstengruft (Ducal graves), the burial place of the dukes of Anhalt-Köthen. Several members of the family are buried in representative coffins, including

- Louis I, Prince of Anhalt-Köthen (1579–1650)
- Louis of Anhalt-Köthen (the Younger) (1607–1624)
- William Louis, Prince of Anhalt-Köthen (1638–1665)
- Lebrecht, Prince of Anhalt-Köthen (1622–1669)
- Emmanuel, Prince of Anhalt-Köthen (1631–1670)
- Emmanuel Lebrecht, Prince of Anhalt-Köthen (1671–1704)
- Gisela Agnes of Rath (1669–1740), wife of Emmanuel Lebrecht
- Leopold, Prince of Anhalt-Köthen (1694–1728)
- Frederica Henriette of Anhalt-Bernburg (1702–1723), wife of Leopold
- Augustus Louis, Prince of Anhalt-Köthen (1697–1755)
- Prince Louis of Anhalt-Köthen (1802–1818)
- Louis Augustus Karl Frederick Emil, Duke of Anhalt-Köthen (1802–1818)

The last Duke of Köthen, Henry (1778–1847), converted to Catholicism and was buried in St. Mary's Church.

== Literature ==
- Stadt- und Kathedralkirche St. Jakob zu Köthen - Kleiner Kirchenführer (in German), Evangelische Kirchengemeinde St. Jakob, Köthen
