= Christian Ferdinand Abel =

German musician

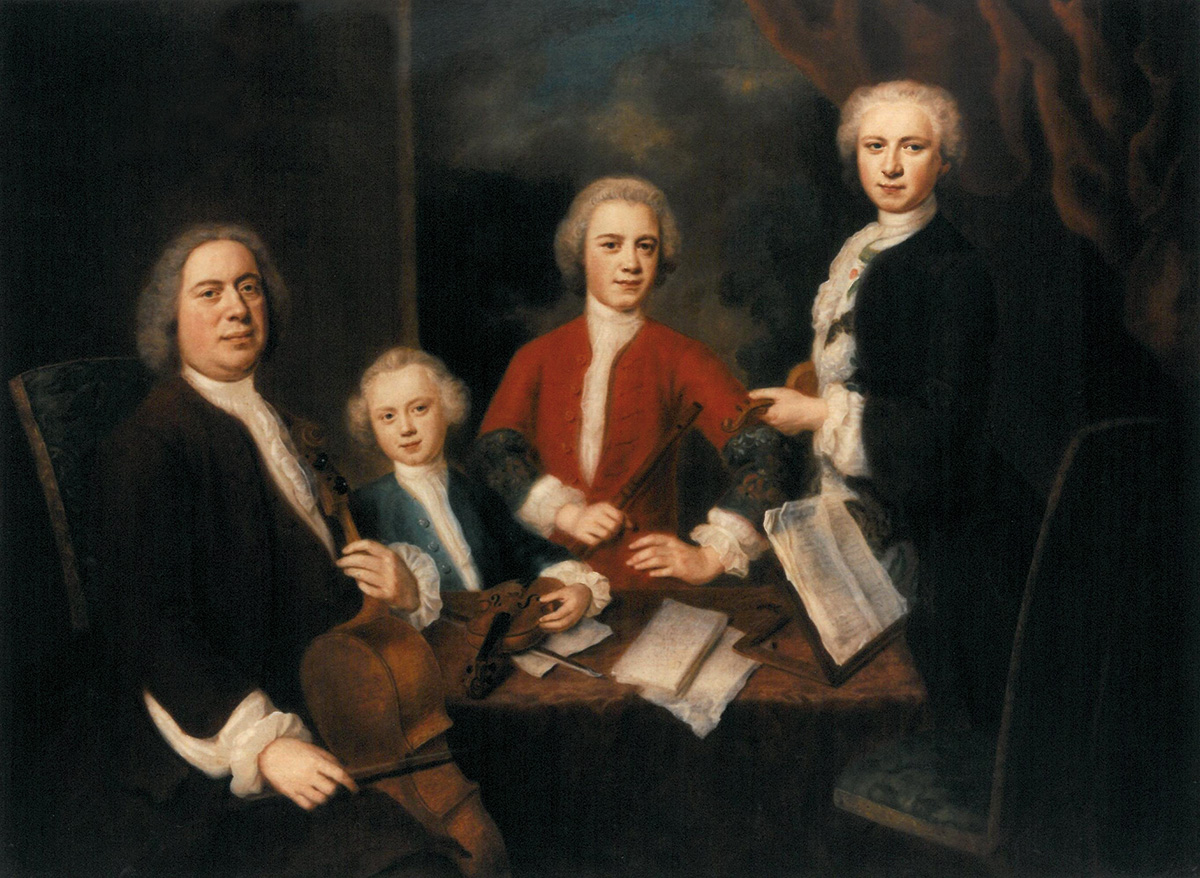
Portrait of the Abel family (Ch. F. Abel is on the left)

Christian Ferdinand Abel (July or August 1682, Hanover, Holy Roman Empire – buried 3 April 1761 (or 1737?), Köthen, Holy Roman Empire) was one of the most famous German Baroque violinists, cellists and especially viol virtuosos.

His father was the composer, violinist and organist Clamor Heinrich Abel. For some time Christian served in the Swedish army of Charles XII during the occupation of northern Germany. There he married the Swede Anna Christina Holm.

Then he went to Berlin, where he was a prominent member of the Hofkapelle of King Frederick I of Prussia. He remained there until its dissolution by Frederick William in 1713. With several of his colleagues he moved to Köthen to work at the court there as a violinist and gambist under Augustin Reinhard Stricker. Abel also worked with Stricker's successor Johann Sebastian Bach. Bach was godfather of his daughter Sophie-Charlotte born on 6 January 1720 in Köthen. In the same year, Abel and Bach accompanied the Prince Leopold on his trip to Carlsbad. It is believed that Bach composed his three sonatas for viola da gamba and harpsichord BWV 1027-1029 probably for Abel to teach Leopold to play the viol.

In 1723, Bach left Köthen to accept a post as cantor at the St. Thomas Church, Leipzig, thus leaving his post in the municipal orchestra free. Abel succeeded him as Premier-Musicus of the Hofkapelle. Abel spent the rest of his life in Köthen, where he was also buried.

Abel's son Carl Friedrich Abel born in 1723 in Köthen was also a productive and known composer and gamba virtuoso. But he was most known for founding the London Bach-Abel concerts in collaboration with Johann Christian Bach, the first subscription concerts in England. His oldest son Leopold August Abel was also a composer and violinist.

== Sources ==
- German and Spanish Wikipedia article
