= Bach House (Köthen) =

Property occupied by J S Bach 1719–23

Coordinates: 51.7512°N 11.9707°E

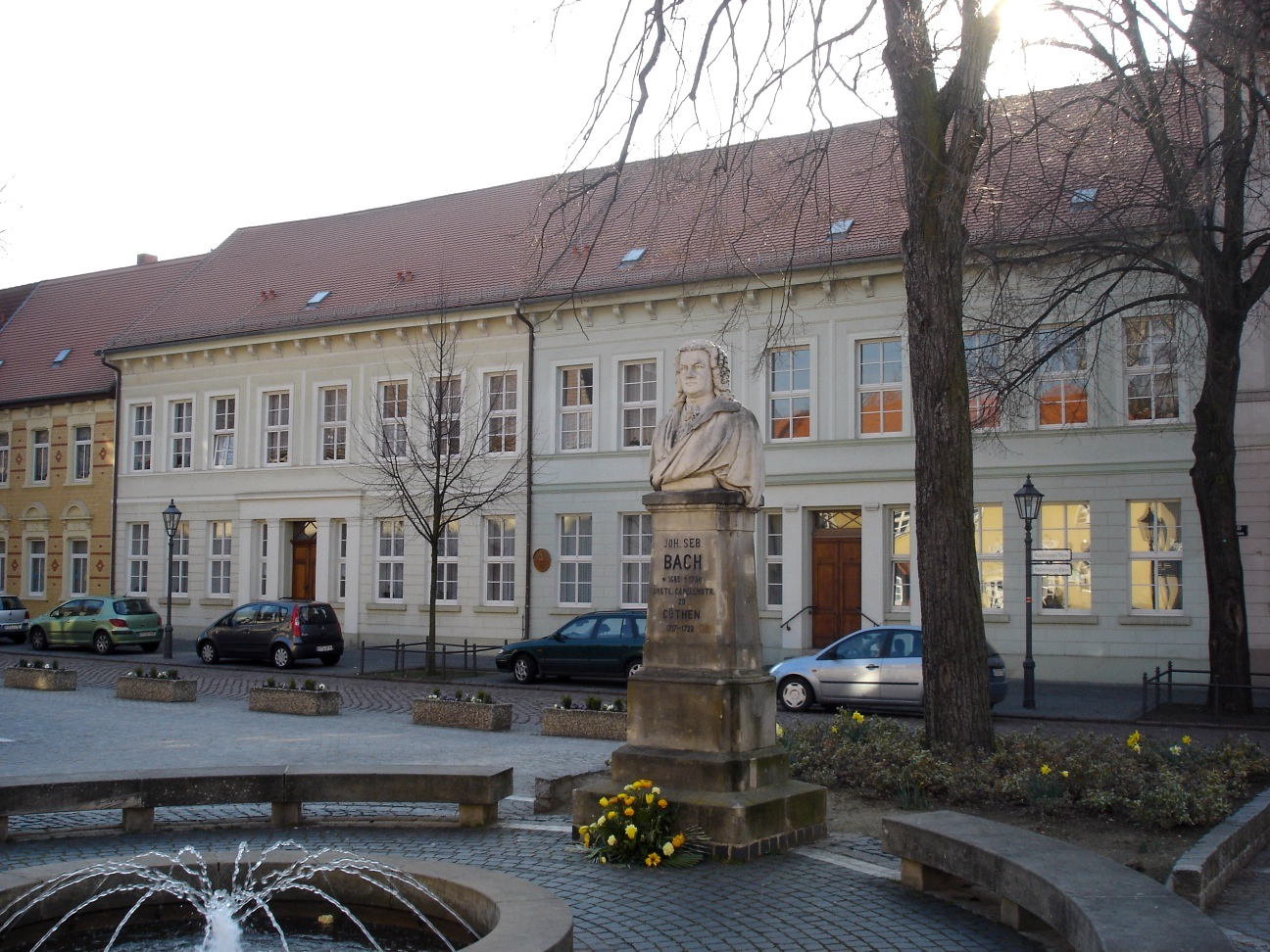
A nineteenth-century monument to the composer stands outside the house where he lived 1719–23

The Bach House (German: Bachhaus Köthen) is an historic house museum dedicated to composer Johann Sebastian Bach, in Köthen, Germany. Bach lived at two addresses during his stay in Köthen, while he was working for Prince Leopold of Anhalt-Köthen. The first of these properties has been demolished, so the Bach House normally refers to the extant building which the composer occupied in the period 1719–23. This property is on Wallstraße (Wall Street) and was completed in 1719: Bach is assumed to have been the first tenant of the house. Documentary evidence of the allowances paid to Bach suggests that the house was also used by the court orchestra.

Initially Bach lived in the Wallstraße house with first wife, Maria Barbara Bach. She died in 1720. Bach married Anna Magdalena Bach in 1721. In 1723 the Bach family moved to Leipzig.

Places where Bach lived
