= Clamor Heinrich Abel =

German composer and musician

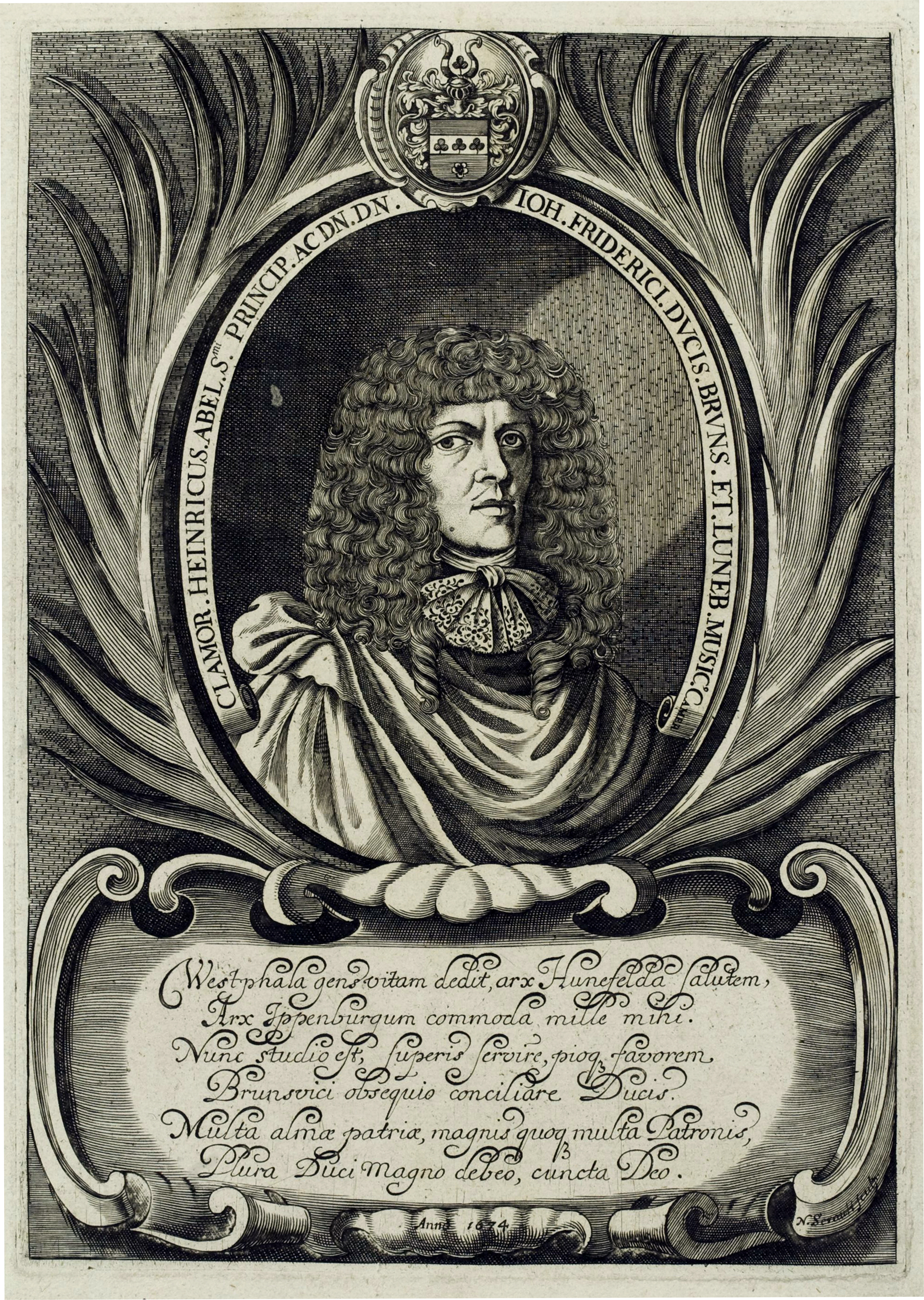
Portrait of „Clamor. Heinricus. Abel.“; „Anno 1674“ dated copper engraving by Noel Serault

Clamor Heinrich Abel (1634 – 25 July 1696) was a German composer, violone player and organist.

Abel was born in Hünnefeld, Westphalia, Holy Roman Empire. He worked as a court musician in Köthen, an organist in Celle and from 1666, as a ducal chamber musician in Hanover. From 1694, he was Obermusicus in Bremen and he remained at this post until his death at Bremen in 1696.

Among his best-known works are compositions for string orchestra and chamber music. He composed a collection of 59 individual works under the title Erstlinge musikalischer Blumen. They included works for four instruments and basso continuo - allemandes, courantes, preludes, sarabandas and sonatinas. First they were published in three volumes in Frankfurt (1674, 1676, 1677) and later they were published together as Drei Opera musica (Brunswick, 1687).

He was the father of the violist and violinist Christian Ferdinand Abel and grandfather of the viol virtuoso and composer Carl Friedrich Abel and Leopold August Abel.

== Works ==
- Erstlinge musikalischer Blumen
- Bataille D Major for 2 violins and basso continuo
- Sonata Sopra Cuccu for violin and basso continuo
- Folie d'Espagne (1685)
