= Zümrüt Gülbay-Peischard =

Turkish-German university teacher (born 1970)

Zümrüt Gülbay-Peischard (born March 25, 1970, in Ankara as Zümrüt Gülbay) is a German lawyer and publicist. Since 1998, she has been a professor of business law at Anhalt University of Applied Sciences in Bernburg (Saale). At the time of her appointment, she was the youngest law professor in Germany.

== Career ==
Gülbay-Peischard grew up in a family of guest workers in Berlin-Wedding. She came to Germany at the age of two and graduated from high school at the top of her class. She then studied Business Administration and Law at the Free University of Berlin from 1989 to 1993. After passing the First State Examination in Law, she worked part-time as an assistant to the senior partner of a commercial law firm during her legal traineeship and earned her doctorate at the age of 25 in European Competition Law with a dissertation on "Comparative Advertising, Subsidiarity, and Europe: The Directive on Comparative Advertising in Accordance with the Principle of Subsidiarity in European Community Law." She subsequently practiced law in Berlin. She also worked as a lecturer at various universities.

In 1998, she was appointed professor at Anhalt University of Applied Sciences in Bernburg (Saale). At the time of her appointment, she was the youngest law professor in Germany and consequently received media attention.

At Anhalt University of Applied Sciences, she is the program director for the Bachelor's and master's degree programs in Business Law within the Department of Business. Her focus is on International Business Law. Since 2018, she has served as the equal opportunities officer for her department. Gülbay-Peischard and Sarah Piper are spokespersons for the State Conference of Equal Opportunities Officers at Universities and University Hospitals in Saxony-Anhalt.

In addition to Bernburg, Gülbay-Peischard teaches at the Berlin Institute of Electronic Business and at the Berlin School of Economics and Law. She works as an external consultant for the law firm Wiesensee, Petruschke and Partners.

Gülbay-Peischard is married and has two children.

== Engagement ==
Gülbay-Peischard works for various integration projects and has spoken out in the media as a German of Turkish origin living in Germany. She spoke at the Integration Congress of the CDU/CSU parliamentary group in mid-October 2008. She was a co-founder of the "Club of the 21st Century", which hosted a discussion with Thilo Sarrazin in 2010. She participated in the German Islam Conference.

On February 5, 2002, she was a guest on the talk show Johannes B. Kerner.On October 6, 2018, Gülbay-Peischard was a contestant on the quiz show I Know Everything!.
