= Jakob Greber =

German Baroque composer and musician

Johann Jakob Greber (approx. 1671–July 1731) was a German Baroque composer and musician. His first name sometimes appeared in its Italianized version, Giacomo, especially during the years he spent in London (1702 – 1705). Greber composed solo cantatas, sonatas, and stage works, including the opera Gli amori di Ergasto which opened London's Queen's Theatre in 1705. He died in Mannheim, where for many years he was Kapellmeister of the court orchestra of Charles III Philip, Elector Palatine.

== Life ==
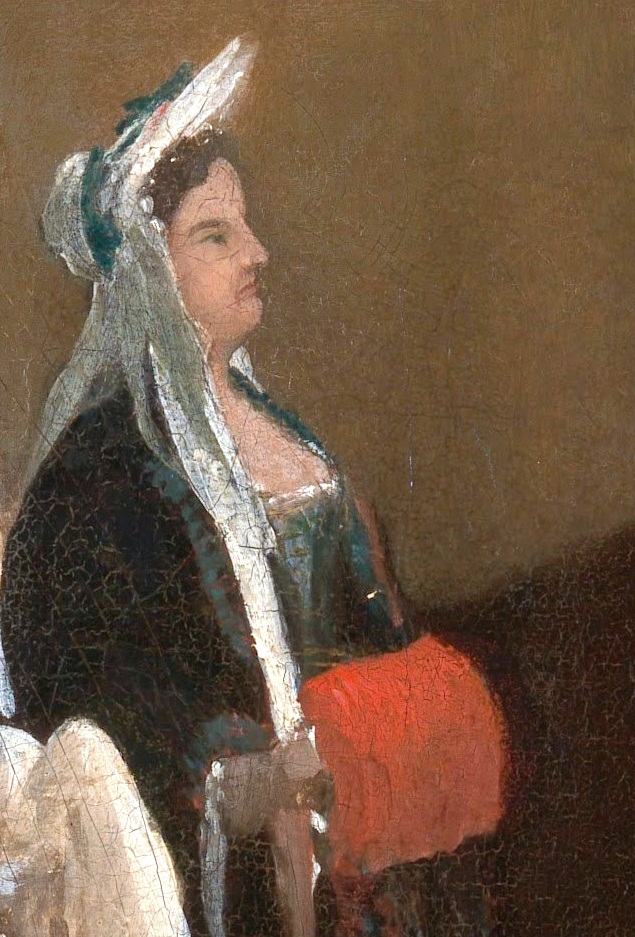
Margherita de L'Epine, Greber's mistress during his London years

Greber's date and place of birth are unknown, although the Neue Deutsche Biographie proposes an approximate date of 1673. He is presumed to have studied in Italy and arrived in London from there in 1702, accompanied by his mistress, the opera singer Margherita de L'Epine. He was to remain in London for the next three years composing incidental music for plays and arias for L'Epine, including that for the 1702 premiere of Nicholas Rowe's play The Fair Penitent, including four arias sung by L'Epine during the interlude. It was during this time that Rowe dubbed L'Epine "Greber's Peg", a name by which she was known for several years. Although L'Epine left Greber in 1703 to live with Daniel Finch, 2nd Earl of Nottingham, she returned to him in 1704, and they took up residence on Suffolk Street in London. He continued composing arias for her and accompanying her in concerts and theatrical interludes at Lincoln's Inn Fields and other venues. The London newspaper The Post Man noted their appearance together at the spa town of Tunbridge Wells in August 1703:

They write from Tunbridge Wells that there is arrived there that famous Italian Lady, Signiora Francesca Margaretta de L'Epine that gives every week entertainments of musick, all compos'd by that great Master Signior Jacomo Greber, perform'd to the content and great satisfaction of all the nobility and gentry.

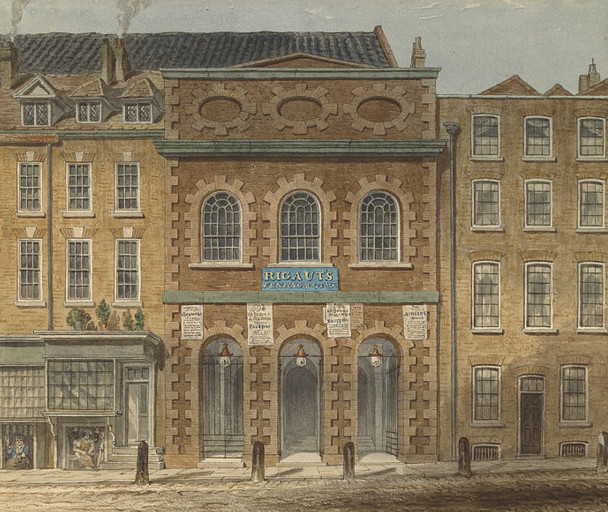
Queen's Theatre London, where Greber's Gli amori di Ergasto premiered in 1705

On 9 April 1705, the Queen's Theatre in London was officially opened with Greber's opera Gli amori di Ergasto (The Loves of Ergasto). It was the first opera sung entirely in Italian by Italian singers to be performed in London. Joanna Maria Lindehleim was one of the singers. The printed libretto also contained an English translation by Peter Anthony Motteux, and on the opening night the performance included a prologue by Samuel Garth and an epilogue by William Congreve, both read by Anne Bracegirdle. The opera itself, a pastorale largely consisting of arias and duets between shepherds and nymphs, proved a dismal failure and was only performed a few times. Shortly after the premiere of Gli amori di Ergasto, Greber left London (without Margherita de L'Epine).

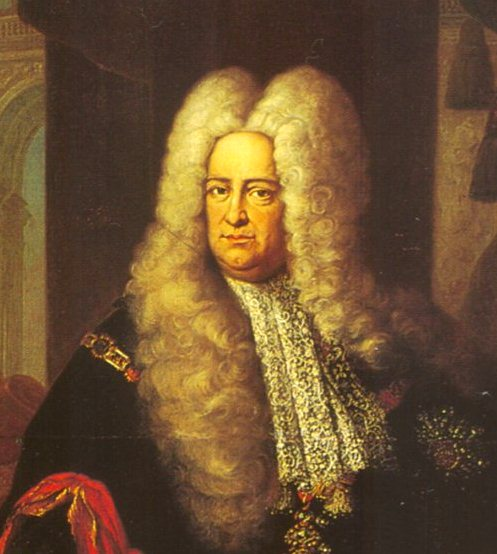
Greber's patron Charles Philip

A baptismal certificate in Düsseldorf, dated 23 June 1705 describes Greber as a Kapellmeister (music director) in the service of Charles Philip, who at the time was the governor of Tyrol with a court in Innsbruck. In 1708 Greber married Katharina Elisabeth, née von Douven who was probably a relative of Johann Franz von Douven, one of Charles Philip's treasury officials. The couple had at least four children. Greber remained in the service of Charles Philip for the rest of his career, working closely on operas and other court entertainments with Augustin Stricker, Johann Hugo von Wilderer, and Gottfried Finger (whom he had known from his London days). When Charles Philip succeeded his brother, Johann Wilhelm, as Elector Palatine in 1716, he combined his brother's court in Düsseldorf with his own court in Innsbruck. The new court was moved first to Neuburg, then to Heidelberg, and finally to Mannheim. The Düsseldorf court orchestra was dissolved in the process, but in 1718, many of its musicians were reinstated in the Innsbruck court orchestra headed by Greber. In 1723, after Charles Philip moved his court to Mannheim, Johann von Wilderer was appointed to serve jointly with Greber as Kapellmeister. Wilderer died in 1724. Greber lived on for another seven years, dying in Mannheim in July 1731. The orchestra he led there later became famous as the orchestra of the Mannheim school.

== Works ==
Opera and oratorio

- Gli amori di Ergasto (The Loves of Ergasto) – pastoral opera in 2 acts; first performed 9 April 1705, Queen's Theatre, London; revised version performed 1711, Vienna; only the score of the Vienna version survives
- L'allegrezza dell'Eno (The Joy of Eno) – festa teatrale; libretto by Giovanni Domenico Pallavicini, overture by Gottfried Finger; first performed May 1708, Innsbruck to celebrate the visit of Elisabeth Christine of Brunswick-Wolfenbüttel; score lost
- Enea in Cartagine (Aeneas in Carthage) – opera; first performed 1711, Komödienhaus, Innsbruck; score lost
- La morte di Cristo (The Death of Christ) – oratorio; first performed 1713, Innsbruck
- Crudelta consuma amore (Cruelty Consumes Love) – pastoral opera in three acts; pastiche with acts 1 and 3 by composed by Greber, act 2 by Augustin Stricker, and the overture by Gottfried Finger; first performed 1717, Neuberg to celebrate the name day of Anna Maria Luisa de' Medici; score lost

Cantatas

- Tu parti idolo mio - alto singer, flute, two violins, and basso continuo
- Quando lungi e il mio fileno - two singers (soprano and alto), two violins and basso continuo
- Filli, tra il gelo e'l foco - soprano singer, two flutes and basso continuo
- Fuori di sua capanna - alto singer, flute and basso continuo

Chamber music

- Sonata in C major for flute and basso continuo
- Sonata in C minor for two flutes and basso continuo
