= Joanna Maria Lindehleim =

Joanna Lindehleim
- Born: unknown 17th century Sweden? Germany?
- Died: 1724; London
- Other name: The Baroness
- Occupation: Soprano
- Known for: singing
- Title: Right Honorable
- Spouse: Andrew Lenduss of Lendenheim (probably)
- Children: 1 (maybe)

Joanna Lindehleim who performed as the Baroness (16?? – 1724) was a singer in London who was born abroad. She came to notice in about 1703. She was known as the wife of a Swedish baron named Andrew Lenduss of Lendenheim.

== Life ==
The details of her early life are unknown. She was advertised as Italian, which was very fashionable for singers, however Charles Burney thought she was only trained in Italy and she was maybe born in Germany. In 1703 she was billed as Signiora Joanna Maria Lindehleim’ and she sang in both French and Italian. Her first few performances were at York Buildings in 1702 and then at Drury Lane and each time she sang with Gasparo Visconti. Visconti was known as Gasparini. In 1702 she and her husband, Andrew Lenduss of Lendenheim, also appears to have given birth and buried a son Andrew.

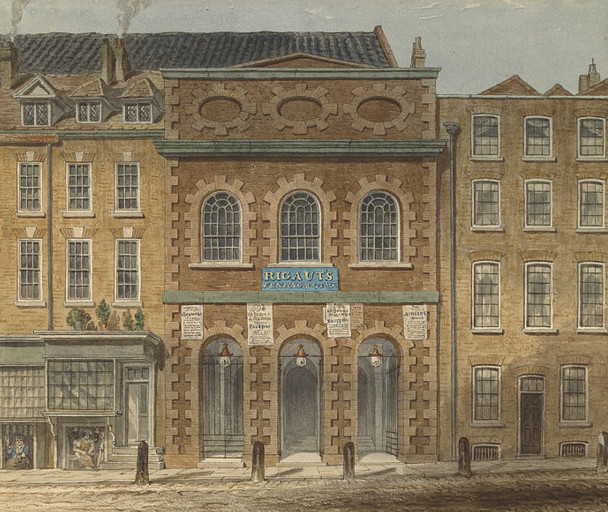
Queen's Theatre London, where Greber's Gli amori di Ergasto premiered in 1705

On 9 April 1705, the Queen's Theatre in London was officially opened with Greber's opera Gli amori di Ergasto (The Loves of Ergasto) by Jakob Greber. It was said to be the first opera sung entirely in Italian by Italian singers to be performed in London. She was one of the singers. In 1706 she was at Drury Lane where she sang Giovanni Bononcini’s Camilla. This latter piece was arranged by the Italian cellist and composer Nicola Francesco Haym. Her name seems to have been a continued confusion and she was billed as "Mrs Joanna Maria" and later when the score for Camilla was printed she was credited as "The Baroness". This latter name was assumed again when she performed Camilla again in 1707 at Drury Lane and again when she was at the Queens Theatre in the Haymarket in 1708.

Haym became her teacher and manager of the already successful soprano. He negotiated a 100 guinea contract for ten performances in 1706. They would live together for the rest of their lives. Haym died in 1729.

Lindehleim died in London in December 1724.
