= Eleonore Wilhelmine of Anhalt-Köthen =

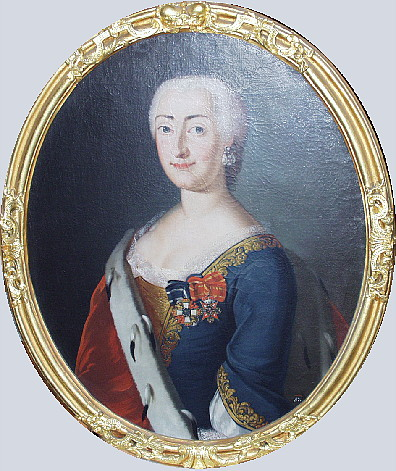
- Born: 7 May 1696; Köthen
- Died: 30 August 1726 (aged 30); Weimar
- Spouse: Frederick Erdmann of Saxe-Merseburg (m. 1714; died 1714) Ernest Augustus I, Duke of Saxe-Weimar-Eisenach (m. 1716)
- Issue: Wilhelm Ernst, Hereditary Prince of Saxe-Weimar; Princess Wilhelmine Auguste; Johann Wilhelm, Hereditary Prince of Saxe-Weimar; Princess Charlotte Agnes Leopoldina; Princess Johanna Eleonore Henriette; Ernestine Albertine, Countess of Schaumburg-Lippe; Bernhardina, Princess of Schwarzburg-Rudolstadt; Prince Emmanuel Frederick
- House: Ascania
- Father: Emmanuel Lebrecht, Prince of Anhalt-Köthen
- Mother: Gisela Agnes of Rath

Eleonore Wilhelmine of Anhalt-Köthen (7 May 1696 in Köthen – 30 August 1726 in Weimar) was a princess of Anhalt-Köthen by births and by marriage successively Princess of Saxe-Merseburg and Duchess of Saxe-Weimar.

== Life ==
Eleonore Wilhelmine was the eldest daughter of Prince Emmanuel Lebrecht of Anhalt-Köthen from his marriage with Gisela Agnes of Rath, Countess of Nienburg. Eleonore Wilhelmine married first on 15 February 1714 in Köthen to Prince Frederick Erdmann of Saxe-Merseburg, son of Christian II, Duke of Saxe-Merseburg. On the occasion of this marriage, he received the district of Dieskau as an apanage. However, fourteen weeks after his marriage he suddenly died.

On 24 January 1716 in Nienburg, Saxony-Anhalt, Eleonore Wilhelmine married for the second time, to Duke Ernest Augustus I of Saxe-Weimar and Saxe-Eisenach. Eleonore Wilhelmine's brother met Johann Sebastian Bach during the wedding festivities, and later invited Bach to become Kapellmeister at the princely court in Köthen. Eleonore Wilhelmine later became the godmother of Bach's son Leopold Augustus.

Her marriage to Ernest Augustus was described as happy. During her ten years of marriage, she gave birth to seven children. After the birth of the Hereditary Prince, primogeniture was introduced in his two duchies.

Eleonore Wilhelmine died on 30 August 1726. She was buried in the ducal crypt at the Historical Cemetery in Weimar. Her widower was affected badly by her death. He left Weimar and started travelling.

== Issue ==
From her second marriage, to Ernest Augustus I of Saxe-Weimar, Eleonore Wilhelmine had the following children:

- William Ernest (1717–1719), Hereditary Prince of Saxe-Weimar
- Wilhelmine Auguste (1717–1752)
- John William (1719–1732), Hereditary Prince of Saxe-Weimar
- Charlotte Agnes Leopoldina (1720–1724)
- Johanna Eleonore Henriette (1721–1722)
- Ernestine Albertine (1722–1769), married in 1756 to Count Philip II Ernst of Schaumburg-Lippe (1723–1787)
- Bernardina Christina Sophia (1724–1757), married in 1744 to Prince John Frederick of Schwarzburg-Rudolstadt (1721–1767)
- Emmanuel Frederick William Bernard (1725–1729)
