= Gisela Agnes of Rath =

Regent of Anhalt-Köthen from 1704 to 1715

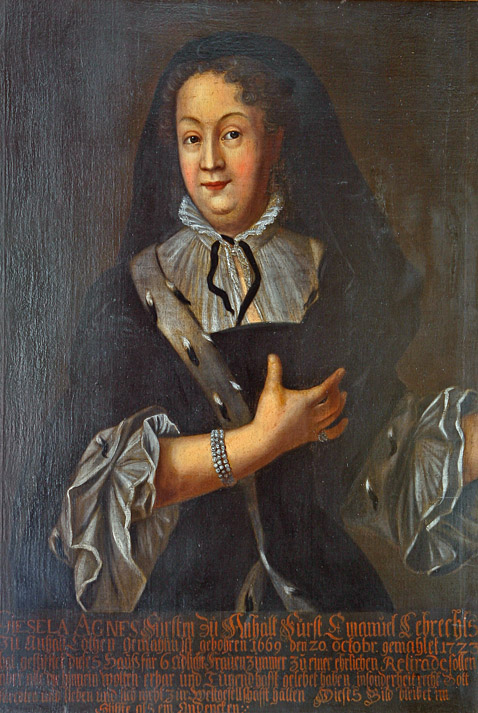
- 18th-century portrait
- Born: 9 October 1669; Kleinwülknitz, now part of Köthen
- Died: 12 March 1740 (aged 70); Nienburg
- Buried: St. Jacob church in Köthen
- Noble family: von Rath
- Spouse: Emmanuel Lebrecht, Prince of Anhalt-Köthen
- Issue more...: Leopold, Prince of Anhalt-Köthen; Eleonore Wilhelmine; Augustus Louis, Prince of Anhalt-Köthen
- Father: Balthasar William of Rath
- Mother: Magdalene Dorothee of Wuthenau

Gisela Agnes of Rath (9 October 1669, in Kleinwülknitz, now part of Köthen – 12 March 1740, in Nienburg) was Duchess of Anhalt-Köthen by marriage from 1698. In 1694, she was created Countess of Nienburg. From 1704 to 1715, she was regent of Anhalt-Köthen for her underage son.

== Life ==
Gisela Agnes was a member of an ancient aristocratic Lutheran family. Her parents were Balthasar William of Rath-Kleinwülknitz (1629-1695) and Magdalene Dorothea of Wuthenau (1640-1694). Her paternal grandfather was Wilhelm von Rath, who commanded the army of Prince Louis I of Anhalf-Köthen during the Thirty Years' War.

The heir to the throne, the young Prince Emmanuel Lebrecht of Anhalt-Köthen fell in love with her. His mother, Princess Eleonore, tried to end this relationship, because Gisela Agnes was considered lower nobility, and unsuitable to marry a ruling Prince. She sent Gisela Agnes to her sister in Stadthagen. However, immediately after Emmanuel Lebrecht had assumed government, he "quietly" married her, on 30 September 1692.

This was a morganatic marriage. Moreover, Prince Emmanuel Lebrecht was a Calvinist and Gisela Agnes was Lutheran. The marriage sparked vehement protests from the Reformed church and the princely family. Nevertheless, children from this marriage were officially recognized as potential heir to the throne by the Princes of Anhalt in 1698 and the emperor in 1699. The later Dukes of Anhalt-Köthen all descend from the "unequal" marriage.

=== Regency ===
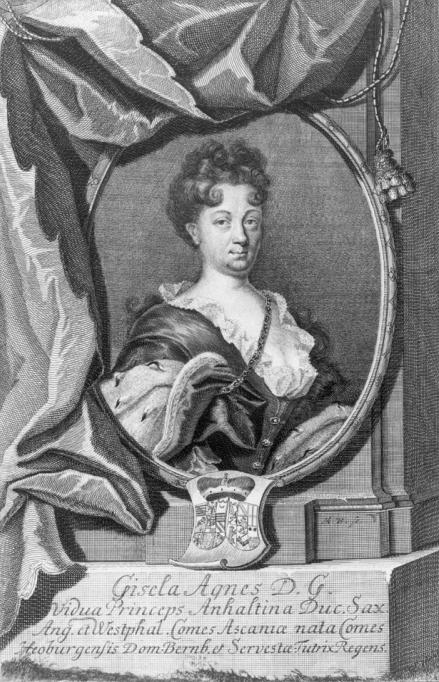
Engraving of Gisela Agnes, early 18th century

During his lifetime, her husband had arranged for her to act as regent for their son Leopold after his death. So when he died in 1704, she took up the regency.

She supported the Lutherans in the principality and founded the St. Agnus church, the first Lutheran church in Köthen. A large portrait of her by Antoine Pesne is still displayed in the church. Only a few years later, Johann Sebastian Bach would become a member of this congregation. In 1711, she founded the Gisela Agnes Stift, a secular convent for single noble ladies.

In 1714, a court orchestra was founded, formally by her, but financed by her son Leopold. Initially, the orchestra was composed mainly of former members of the court orchestra in Berlin, which had been dissolved the previous year. The first conductor was the opera composer Augustin Reinhard Stricker. In 1717, he was replaced by Johann Sebastian Bach.

In 1694, Emperor Leopold I elevated Gisela Agnes to "Countess of Nienburg". In 1699, Emmanuel Lebrecht gave her the castle, city and district of Nienburg as a personal possession for life. When the regency ended in 1715, Gisela Agnes withdrew to Nienburg, where she continued to support Lutheranism. She became friends with the theologian and poet August Hermann Francke, who even visited her on her widow's seat.

On 24 January 1716, her daughter Eleonore Wilhelmine married in Nienburg to Duke Ernest Augustus I of Saxe-Weimar-Eisenach. It is widely believed that her son Leopold first met the composer Bach during the wedding celebrations.

Gisela Agnes died in Nienburg on 12 March 1740 and was buried in the princely crypt in the St. Jacob church in Köthen.

== Issue ==
Gisela Agnes and Emmanuel Lebrecht had six children:

1. Augustus Lebrecht (24 May 1693 in Köthen – 25 October 1693 in Köthen) died before the recognition of the marriage of his parents as equal and lawful; for this reason, he was never recognized as Hereditary Prince of Anhalt-Köthen.
2. Leopold, Prince of Anhalt-Köthen 29 November 1694 in Köthen – 29 September 1728 in Köthen).
3. Eleonore Wilhelmine (7 May 1696 in Köthen – 30 August 1726 in Weimar), married on 15 February 1714 to Prince Frederick Erdmann of Saxe-Merseburg (1691-1714), and secondly on 24 January 1716 to Ernest Augustus I, Duke of Saxe-Weimar-Eisenach.
4. Augustus Louis, Prince of Anhalt-Köthen (9 June 1697 in Köthen – 6 August 1755 in Köthen).
5. Gisela Auguste (24 July 1698 in Köthen – 3 September 1698 in Köthen).
6. Christiane Charlotte (12 January 1702 in Köthen – 27 January 1745 in Köthen).

== Fiction ==
- Friedrich Heine: Gisela Agnes, ein kulturhistorischer Roman, Schettler, Köthen, 1909
