= Emmanuel Lebrecht, Prince of Anhalt-Köthen =

German prince (1671-1704)

Emmanuel Lebrecht
- Prince of Anhalt-Köthen
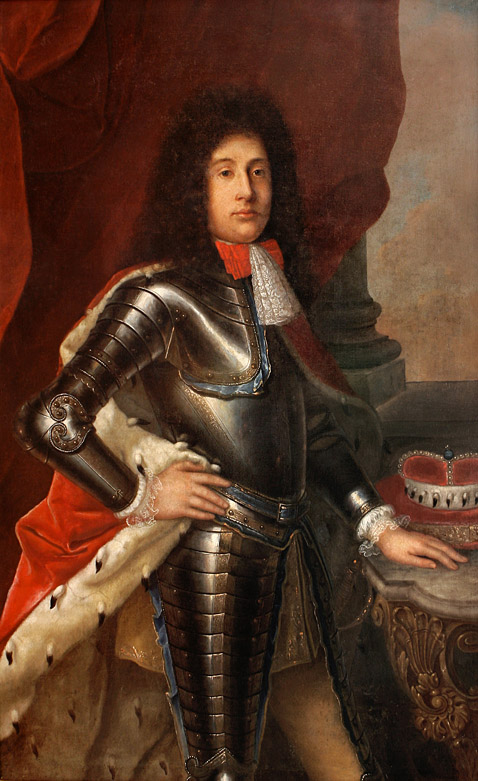
- Born: 20 May 1671; Köthen
- Died: 30 May 1704 (aged 33); Köthen
- Noble family: Ascania
- Spouse: Gisela Agnes of Rath
- Issue more...: Leopold, Prince of Anhalt-Köthen; Eleonore Wilhelmine; Augustus Louis, Prince of Anhalt-Köthen
- Father: Emmanuel, Prince of Anhalt-Köthen
- Mother: Anna Eleonore of Stolberg-Wernigerode

Emmanuel Lebrecht of Anhalt-Köthen (20 May 1671 – 30 May 1704) was a German prince of the House of Ascania and ruler of the principality of Anhalt-Köthen.

He was the only child of Emmanuel, Prince of Anhalt-Köthen, by his wife Anna Eleonore, daughter of Henry Ernest, Count of Stolberg.

== Life ==
Emmanuel Lebrecht was born six months after the death of his father on 8 November 1670 and was declared ruler of Anhalt-Köthen under the regency of his mother immediately at birth. The Dowager Princess Anna Eleonore ruled over Köthen for almost twenty years, until her death in 1690, and then John George II, Prince of Anhalt-Dessau, succeeded her in the regency for the next two years, until January 1692, when Emmanuel Lebrecht was formally proclaimed an adult and took over the government of his lands.

When Emmanuel Lebrecht was still a young prince, he fell in love with Gisela Agnes of Rath (b. Klein-Wülknitz near Köthen, 9 October 1669 - d. Nienburg, 12 March 1740), of an old noble family of Anhalt. The Dowager Princess Anna Eleonore was totally against their liaison and tried to separated the couple by sending Gisela Agnes to Stadthagen with her sister.

After the death of the Dowager Princess and formal assumption of the rule of his principality, Emmanuel Lebrecht sent for Gisela Agnes and they finally married in a secret ceremony in Nienburg on 22 May (30 September according to some sources) of 1692.

The morganatic marriage of a Reformist prince with a Lutheran woman from the lesser nobility brought vehements protest from the Reform Church and the other agnates of the Anhalt principalities. Nonetheless, Gisela Agnes was created Imperial Countess of Nienburg (German: Reichsgräfin von Nienburg) on 23 July 1694.

The agnates refused to accept the marriage as dynastically valid and Emmanuel Lebrecht sued them before the Reichshofrat for libel in 1696; finally, by means of a treaty of 28 June 1698, the Princes of Anhalt-Bernburg, Anhalt-Harzgerode, Anhalt-Zerbst, and Anhalt-Dessau all recognized the issue of the marriage as lawful heirs and all descendants as princes and princesses of Anhalt with all appertaining rights, without however creating any precedent against the prescriptions of the law of the House of Ascania. The Imperial confirmation of the treaty was granted on 12 March 1699.

On August 3 of that year Emmanuel Lebrecht assigned his wife the castle, city, and bailiwick of Nienburg as dowager for life and made her "tutrix and regent" in case of the minority of his successor, with the full approval of the agnates. In 1702, he made a testament in which the principle of primogeniture was introduced in Köthen; later, there was a dispute between his two surviving sons, Leopold and Augustus Louis. Emmanuel Lebrecht died two years later leaving an infant successor, Leopold, who reigned until 1715 under the regency of his mother.

== Issue ==
1. Augustus Lebrecht (b. Köthen, 24 May 1693 - d. Köthen, 25 October 1693), who died before the recognition of the marriage of his parents as equal and lawful; for this reason, he was never recognized as Hereditary Prince of Anhalt-Köthen.
2. Leopold, Prince of Anhalt-Köthen (b. Köthen, 29 November 1694 - d. Köthen, 29 September 1728).
3. Eleonore Wilhelmine (b. Köthen, 7 May 1696 - d. Weimar, 30 August 1726), married on 15 February 1714 to Frederick Erdmann of Saxe-Merseburg, and secondly on 24 January 1716 to Ernest Augustus I, Duke of Saxe-Weimar-Eisenach.
4. Augustus Louis, Prince of Anhalt-Köthen (b. Köthen, 9 June 1697 - d. Köthen, 6 August 1755).
5. Gisela Auguste (b. Köthen, 24 July 1698 - d. Köthen, 3 September 1698).
6. Christiane Charlotte (b. Köthen, 12 January 1702 - d. Köthen, 27 January 1745).

Emmanuel Lebrecht, Prince of Anhalt-Köthen House of Ascania Born: 20 May 1671 Died: 30 May 1704
Preceded by Emmanuel	Prince of Anhalt-Köthen; 1671–1704	Succeeded by Leopold
