= Anhalt University of Applied Sciences =

Vocational university in Bernburg, Germany

Coordinates: 51.8236°N 11.7092°E

- Type: State
- Established: 1991
- Budget: approx. EUR 31,000,000 double budget 2010/11
- President: Jörg Bagdahn
- Students: 8.020 WS 2015/16
- Location: Köthen (headquarters), Bernburg (Saale) & Dessau-Roßlau, Saxony-Anhalt, Germany
- Website: hs-anhalt.de

Anhalt University of Applied Sciences (German: Hochschule Anhalt) is a public university of applied sciences in Saxony-Anhalt, Germany, with campuses in Bernburg (Saale), Dessau-Roßlau and Köthen, Germany. It was established in 1991 during the restructuring of the higher-education system in the newly established federal state of Saxony-Anhalt.

The university combines practice-oriented teaching with applied research in fields including engineering, natural sciences, agriculture, economics, computer science, photovoltaics, architecture and design. Its present-day structure incorporates educational and research traditions that predate the establishment of the university in 1991, particularly in engineering education in Köthen and agricultural research and education in Bernburg.

== History ==
=== Köthen and the tradition of engineering education ===
The historical roots of engineering education at the Köthen campus extend to the Friedrichs-Polytechnikum, which was founded in Köthen in 1891. The institution developed as a center for technical education, with fields including mechanical engineering, electrical engineering and technical chemistry. Its history forms part of the longer tradition of higher technical education in Köthen.

The technical-educational tradition of Köthen continued through several institutional forms during the 20th century and subsequently became part of the academic environment from which Hochschule Anhalt emerged.

=== Bernburg and agricultural education ===
The Bernburg campus has its roots in a long tradition of agricultural research and education in the region. Agricultural experimental and research institutions were established in Bernburg during the 19th century and subsequently contributed to the development of higher agricultural education in the city.

Following German reunification, higher-education institutions in Bernburg, Dessau and Köthen were reorganized as part of the restructuring of higher education in Saxony-Anhalt. The resulting institution combined educational traditions from the three locations within a single university of applied sciences.

=== Establishment of Hochschule Anhalt ===
Fachhochschule Anhalt was established in 1991 with campuses in Bernburg, Dessau and Köthen. The first students began their studies in Bernburg and Köthen in 1991, while the Dessau campus was incorporated into the institution in 1992. Professor Klaus Hertwig became the founding rector.

The institution was established with a practice-oriented mission, combining higher education with applied research and cooperation with regional industry and other organizations. This orientation has remained a characteristic of the university's academic profile.

In 1998, the institution changed its name from Fachhochschule Anhalt to Hochschule Anhalt.

The university subsequently introduced the Bachelor's and Master's degree system and expanded its research activities and international cooperation.

=== Dessau and the Bauhaus tradition ===
The Dessau campus is located in a city internationally associated with the Bauhaus, which operated in Dessau from 1925 to 1932. The university's programmes in architecture and design are therefore situated within a city with an important architectural and design heritage.

== Campuses and faculties ==
Hochschule Anhalt is organized into seven faculties distributed across its three campuses.

=== Bernburg ===
The Bernburg campus is home to:

- Department of Agriculture, Ecotrophology and Landscape Development
- Economics Department

The campus has an academic profile focused particularly on agriculture, food and nutrition, landscape development and economics.

=== Dessau ===
The Dessau campus is home to:

- Department of Architecture, Facility Management and Geoinformation
- Department of Design

The campus combines architecture, planning, geoinformation, facility management and design.

=== Köthen ===
The Köthen campus is home to:

- Department of Computer Science and Languages
- Department of Electrical, Mechanical and Industrial Engineering
- Department of Applied Biosciences and Process Engineering

Köthen is consequently a major center of the university's activities in engineering, information technology, natural sciences and applied technology.

== Academic profile and research ==
Hochschule Anhalt combines practice-oriented degree programmes with applied research. Its academic activities cover engineering, information technology, natural sciences, agriculture, economics, architecture, design and related interdisciplinary fields.

Research at the university includes renewable energy, engineering, information technologies, agricultural sciences, biotechnology, environmental technologies, materials and other application-oriented fields.

=== Photovoltaic and renewable-energy research ===
Photovoltaic research is one of the university's areas of applied research, particularly within engineering and interdisciplinary research involving energy, agriculture and environmental applications.

Research activities at Hochschule Anhalt have included photovoltaic system performance and reliability, photovoltaic system modeling, photovoltaic potential assessment and agrivoltaics. The university has also participated in research involving photovoltaic systems under Central European climatic conditions and in international research on agrivoltaic systems.

In April 2018, Hochschule Anhalt and the Solar Energy Research Institute of Singapore (SERIS) officially opened a joint photovoltaic test field in Bernburg as part of the TruePower alliance. The facility was established as a test site for temperate climatic conditions and formed part of an international network of outdoor photovoltaic testing facilities.

The TruePower test field was designed to investigate the effects of environmental conditions on the actual energy yield of photovoltaic modules and systems. The Bernburg facility included high-precision measurements of photovoltaic module and string characteristics, energy yield and meteorological conditions, allowing photovoltaic performance under temperate climatic conditions to be compared with test sites in other climate zones.

The university's photovoltaic research has also included studies of photovoltaic module durability and manufacturing processes, as well as geographical-information-system methods for identifying suitable areas for photovoltaic installations.

==== Agrivoltaics ====
Hochschule Anhalt conducts research on agrivoltaics, investigating the combination of photovoltaic electricity generation with agricultural production and biodiversity conservation.

The Bernburg installation is used for research into photovoltaic energy production, agricultural production and biodiversity. Different photovoltaic module technologies are tested, while agricultural researchers investigate crop production between the vertically mounted modules and researchers in landscape development investigate biodiversity-promoting vegetation.

== Doctoral education ==
Hochschule Anhalt provides opportunities for doctoral research in addition to its Bachelor's and Master's degree programmes. Doctoral research is conducted through individual research projects under the supervision of professors and through designated doctoral structures and cooperative doctoral procedures.

A central doctoral structure is the Doctoral Center Engineering Sciences and Information Technologies (Promotionszentrum Ingenieurwissenschaften und Informationstechnologien, IWIT). The center is a joint doctoral center involving Hochschule Anhalt, Harz University of Applied Sciences and Merseburg University of Applied Sciences.

IWIT provides a framework for doctoral research in engineering sciences and information technologies. Doctoral candidates associated with the center can obtain doctoral degrees such as Dr.-Ing. or Dr. rer. nat., depending on their field of research and the applicable doctoral regulations.

The research fields represented by IWIT include engineering, information technologies and related applied scientific disciplines. The doctoral center provides prospective doctoral candidates with a framework for developing and conducting individual doctoral research projects and for completing the doctoral examination process.

The doctoral center is also part of Hochschule Anhalt's development as a research-oriented university of applied sciences. In March 2026, a doctoral candidate at Hochschule Anhalt defended a dissertation at IWIT in the field of explainable artificial intelligence and computer vision.

As of August 2026, IWIT reported 35 professorial members, 57 ongoing doctoral projects and six completed doctorates.

== International orientation ==
Hochschule Anhalt has an international orientation, with international students, partner institutions and international study and research programmes. The university operates international cooperation and student-exchange programmes and offers degree programmes with international and English-language components.

International cooperation also forms part of the university's research activities, including collaborative projects with universities, research institutions and other organizations outside Germany.

== Applied research and knowledge transfer ==
The university's institutional mission emphasizes the connection between scientific research and practical application. Its development since 1991 has included cooperation with companies, public institutions and research organizations and the transfer of research results into practical applications.

Research and knowledge-transfer activities encompass engineering, renewable energy, agriculture, biotechnology, information technology, architecture, environmental technologies and other applied-science fields.

The combination of practice-oriented education, applied research, cooperation with external organizations and doctoral research represents an important part of Hochschule Anhalt's academic profile.

== Gallery ==
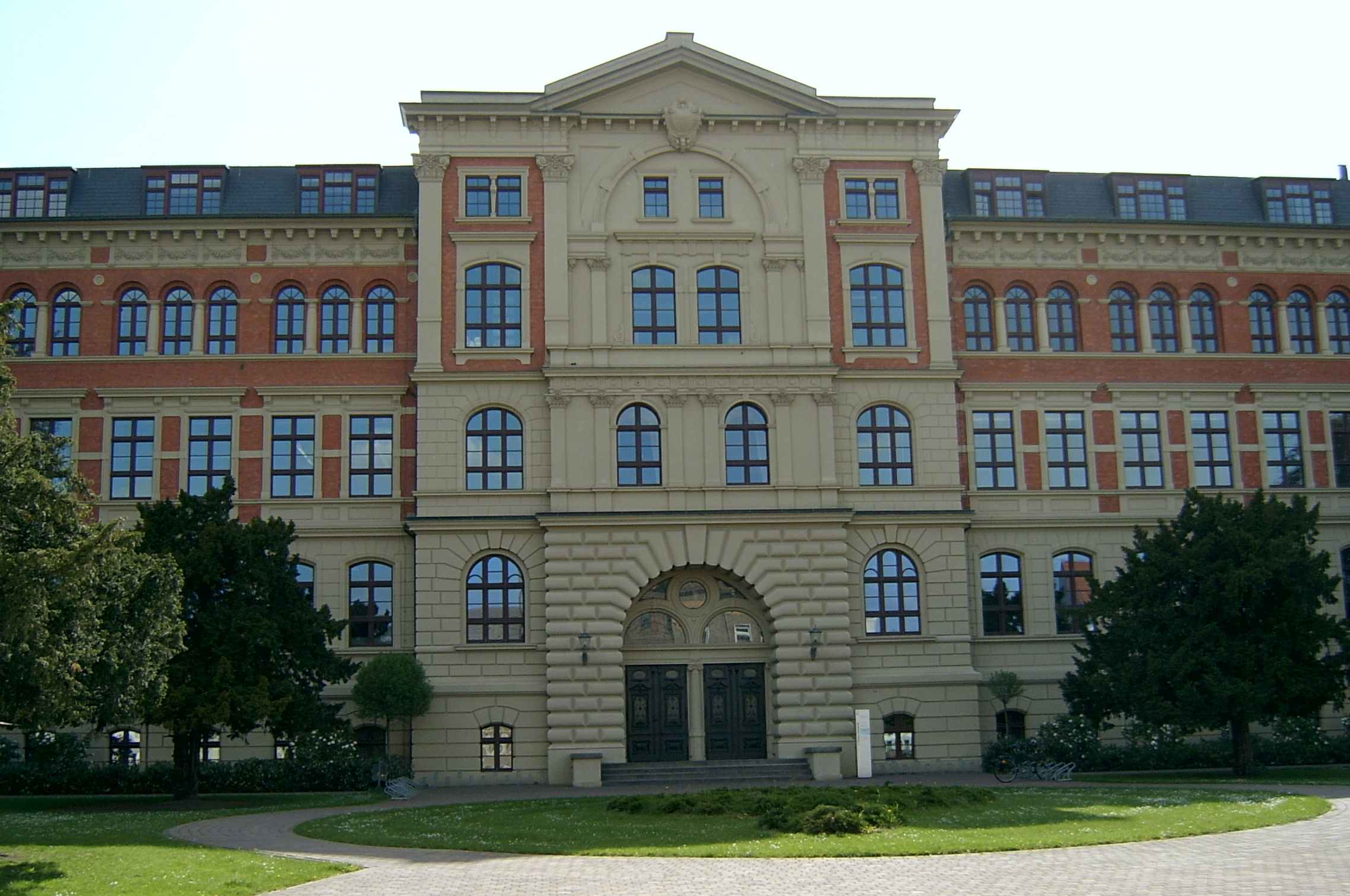
The main building in Köthen

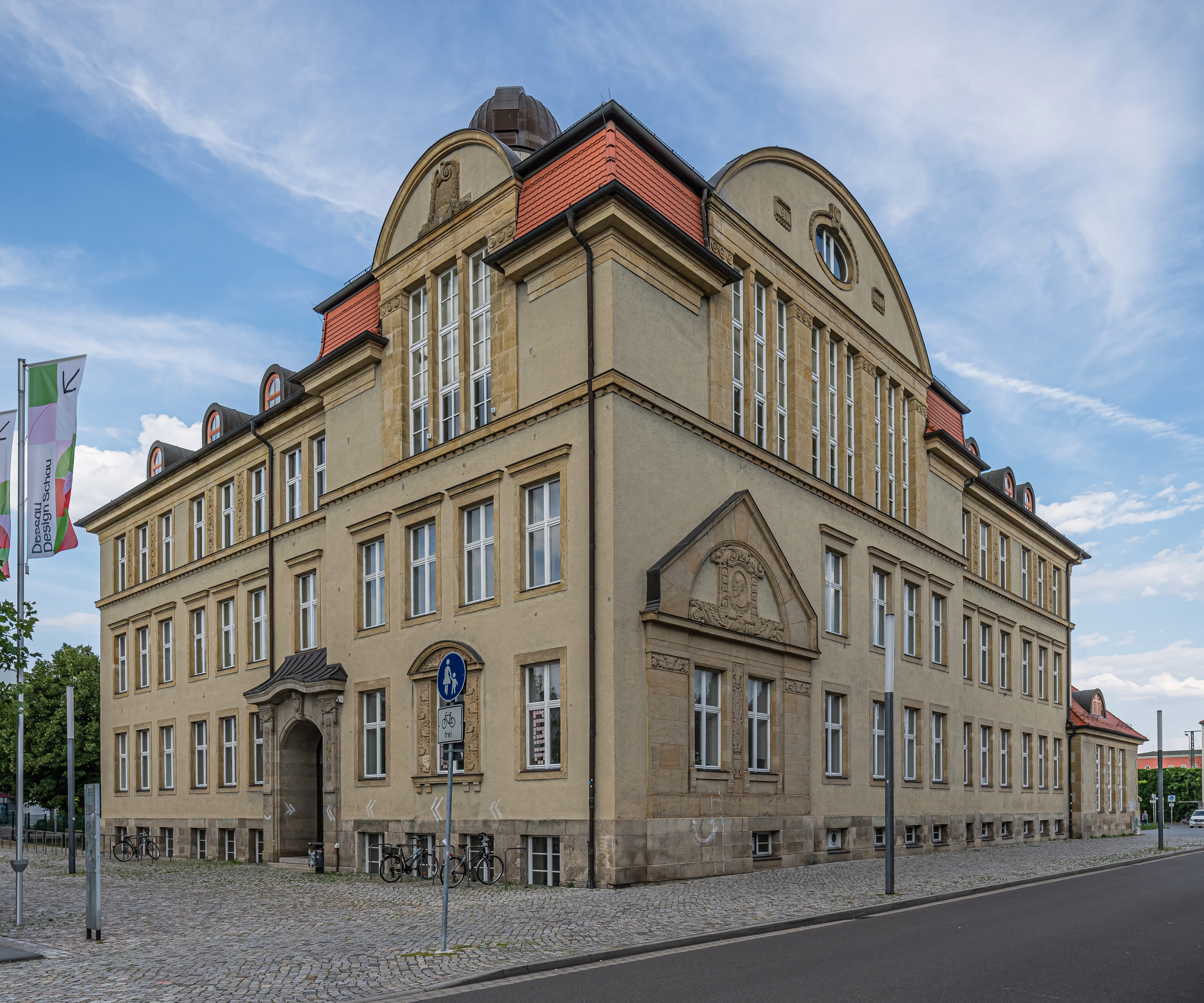
Seminar Building, Campus Dessau
