= Leopold, Prince of Anhalt-Köthen =

Prince of Anhalt-Köthen from 1704 to 1728

Leopold
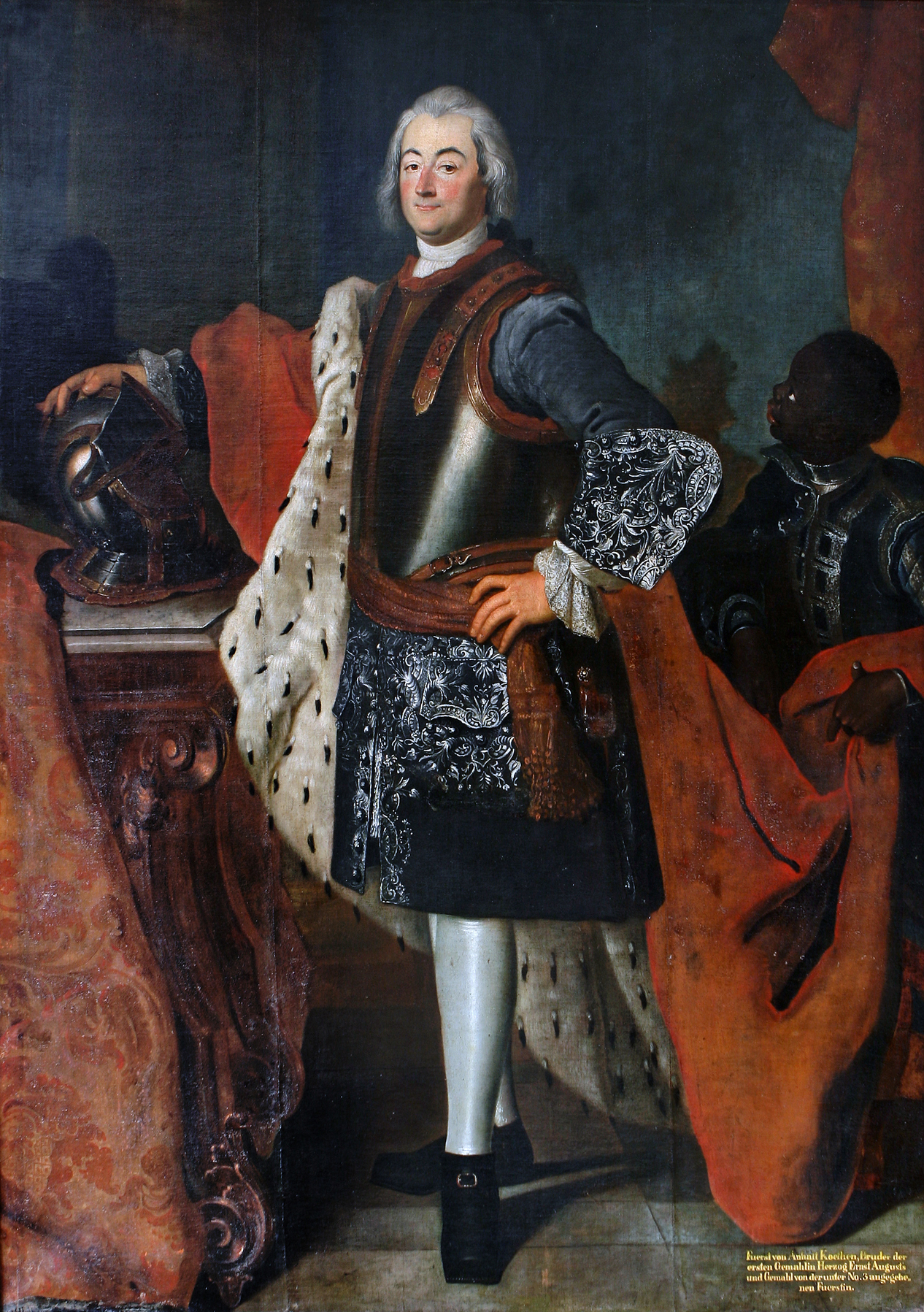
- Portrait of Leopold, early 18th century

Prince of Anhalt-Köthen
- Reign: 1704–1728
- Predecessor: Emmanuel Lebrecht
- Successor: Augustus Louis
- Born: 28 November 1694; Köthen, Anhalt-Köthen, Holy Roman Empire
- Died: 19 November 1728 (aged 33); Köthen, Anhalt-Köthen, Holy Roman Empire
- Spouse: Frederica Henriette of Anhalt-Bernburg; Charlotte Frederike of Nassau-Siegen
- Issue: Gisela Agnes, Princess of Anhalt-Dessau
- House: Ascania
- Father: Emmanuel Lebrecht, Prince of Anhalt-Köthen
- Mother: Gisela Agnes of Rath

Leopold of Anhalt-Köthen (29 November 1694 – 19 November 1728) was a German prince of the House of Ascania and ruler of the principality of Anhalt-Köthen. Today, he is best remembered for employing Johann Sebastian Bach as his Kapellmeister between 1717 and 1723.

He was born at Köthen, the second (but eldest surviving) son of Emmanuel Lebrecht, Prince of Anhalt-Köthen, by his wife Gisela Agnes of Rath.

== Life ==
=== Early years ===
At his birth, the agnates of the Anhalt principalities still did not recognize Leopold's right of inheritance due to the morganatic status of his parents' marriage. These rights were confirmed on 28 June 1698, however, and Leopold was able to succeed his father when he died in 1704, at age ten. His mother, the Dowager Princess Gisela Agnes, acted as regent on his behalf, but King Frederick I of Prussia, according to the late Prince's will, became his "upper guardian". From the beginning of the regency, conflicts arose between the king and the dowager princess: Frederick preferred a Reformed (Calvinistic) education for Leopold, but Gisela Agnes, a devout Lutheran, planned to raise her son in her own faith. In the meanwhile, the king had founded the Knight's Academy (German: Ritterakademie) in Brandenburg an der Havel, and in 1708 decided to send Leopold there for his education. In November of that year, during the festivities accompanying the King's new marriage, the Berlin court witnessed a performance of the opera Alexander and Roxana by Augustin Reinhard Stricker, in which the fourteen-year-old Leopold performed as a dancer.

=== The Grand Tour ===
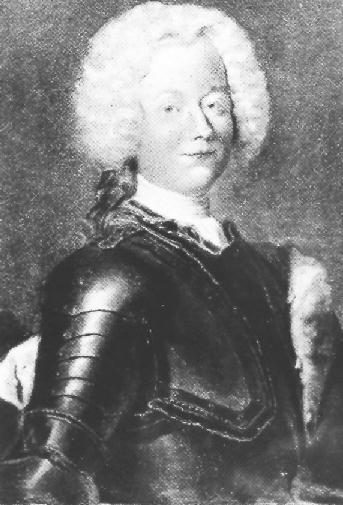
Portrait of Leopold, 1710

On 9 October 1710 Leopold began his Grand Tour. He was escorted by the Lutheran Jobst Christoph von Zanthier, because "no suitable Reformed chaperone could be found". The Tour first took him to The Hague during the winter of 1710–1711, where his lifelong love of opera began: in only four months, he went to the opera twelve times. The operas of Jean-Baptiste Lully impressed him greatly, and he acquired a "Rare fascination for the Opera of Monsieur Lully". Also, he learned to play the harpsichord and violin. His travel diary is still preserved in the Köthen Historical Museum.

After Leopold's return in 1711, King Frederick I wanted to make him a commander in the Prussian army, but the opposition of the dowager princess led him to withdraw this idea. Instead, Leopold traveled again, this time to England, where he attended the opera in London and visited the University of Oxford, whose famous library specially interested him.

Next on his itinerary were Rome and Venice, where he spent 130 Thalers just for visits to the opera theaters. Later, he traveled to Florence, Turin, and finally Vienna, where he acquired a collection of twelve cantatas by Francesco Mancini. On 17 April 1713, Leopold returned to Köthen. In all, he spent the sum of 55,749 Thalers on his trips. In 1714, he seized an opportunity to create a court Kapelle (musical establishment) made possible by the dissolution of the royal Prussian court orchestra. Many of the Berlin musicians entered his service. Its first Kapellmeister was the opera composer Augustin Reinhard Stricker, who was succeeded three years later by Johann Sebastian Bach.

=== Reign ===
==== Family disputes ====
On 30 November 1715 Leopold was declared of age and began his personal rule over Anhalt-Köthen; on 14 May 1716 he formally took possession of the Schloss (main residence). His mother, the dowager princess, moved to her estate in Nienburg.

Problems with succession quickly developed for the prince. As of 1702, the rule of primogeniture was instituted in Anhalt-Köthen; for this reason, Leopold forced his younger brother Augustus Louis to resign his joint rulership. As compensation, Leopold gave him the estate of Güsten, with its old Schloss built in 1547 by Prince George III, and the town of Warmsdorf with all its revenues, in addition to other concessions.

Leopold nonetheless had repeated disputes with his brother Augustus Louis in Warmsdorf, as well as his mother in Nienburg. In 1718 (or 1719) Augustus Louis sent armed men to two of Leopold's towns in order to take them over. His own mother was informed of this situation and supported her younger son. In revenge for that humiliation, Leopold in 1721 sent troops into Nienburg, but mother and son were soon reconciled. In August 1722 Leopold and his brother were also finally reconciled and concluded a definitive divisionary treaty; their mother was not a part of the settlement.

==== Relationship with J.S. Bach ====
Leopold most likely made Bach's acquaintance at the wedding of his sister Eleonore Wilhelmine to Ernest Augustus I, Duke of Saxe-Weimar, which was held at his mother's estate in Nienburg on 24 January 1716. When Stricker left his post the following year, Leopold lost no time in offering the job of Kapellmeister to Bach, who signed his contract on 7 August 1717. Bach was not able to break easily from his former employer Duke William Ernest of Saxe-Weimar, who imprisoned him from 6 November-2 December 1717 for not following correct procedures in requesting release from his post as Konzertmeister at the court of Weimar. Only after 2 December 1717 Bach could finally take his new post in Köthen.

The simple style of church music mandated at Leopold's Reformed (Calvinistic) court led to Bach's concentration on instrumental music and secular vocal music during his employment at Köthen. Much of Bach's secular music, including several of the Brandenburg Concerti and Part I of the Well-Tempered Clavier, stem from his years at Köthen. Bach composed a number of secular cantatas, or serenatas, in Leopold's honor; for example Die Zeit, die Tag und Jahre macht, BWV 134a. He also probably composed some music for Leopold to perform. Leopold played stringed instruments, in particular the viola de gamba. While some of Bach's music for that instrument was written for the virtuoso Christian Ferdinand Abel to perform, it appears that easier music would have been performed by Leopold.

Leopold and Bach appear to have had a good relationship. The prince stood as godfather for Bach's son, Leopold Augustus, who died in infancy in 1719. Leopold had to contribute more and more to the Prussian military, leaving him with less money for music. In 1723 Bach left his post in Köthen to become Kantor at the Thomasschule in Leipzig. The main reason for Bach's departure was the reduction of the Köthen court orchestra, not any dissatisfaction with Bach's services on the part of the prince, but there were other sources of tension, such as a lack of interest in Bach's music on the part of the prince's first wife. Nevertheless, in Leipzig Bach retained the role of Köthen court composer for the rest of Leopold's short life. In 1729 Bach returned to Köthen to direct the funeral music when the prince's embalmed body was transferred to St James church for burial. The text of this cantata, entitled Klagt, Kinder, klagt es aller Welt, has survived, but Bach's music is lost: it might be an early version in at least ten parts of what was to become the St Matthew Passion for two choirs and orchestra.

Schloss Köthen is now a museum, and a biannual Bach Festival is held in the very locations where much of his music was first performed.

== Marriages and Issue ==
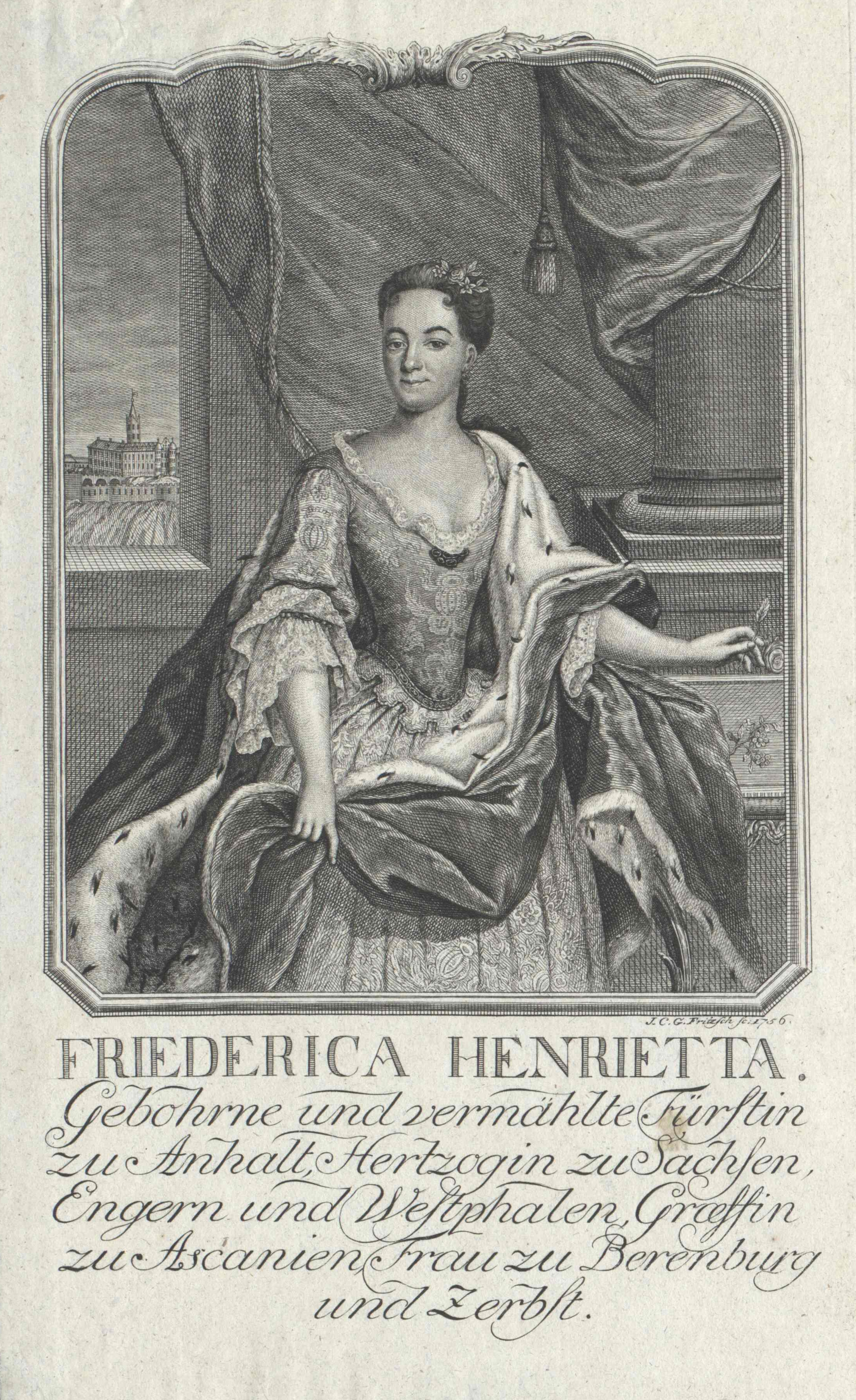
Friederica Henrietta, Leopold's first wife

In Bernburg on 11 December 1721 Leopold married his cousin Frederica Henriette (b. Bernburg, 24 January 1702 – d. Köthen, 4 April 1723), daughter of Karl Frederick, Prince of Anhalt-Bernburg. They had one daughter:

1. Gisela Agnes (b. Köthen, 21 September 1722 – d. Dessau, 20 April 1751), married on 25 May 1737 to Leopold II, Prince of Anhalt-Dessau.

Leopold apparently named his daughter after his mother as a gesture of reconciliation between them.

In Weimar on 27 June 1725 Leopold married for a second time to Charlotte Frederike (b. Siegen, 30 November 1702 – d. Stadthagen, 22 July 1785), daughter of Frederick William Adolf, Prince of Nassau-Siegen. They had two children:

1. Emmanuel Louis, Hereditary Prince of Anhalt-Köthen (b. Köthen, 12 September 1726 – d. of smallpox, Köthen, 17 August 1728).
2. Leopoldine Charlotte (b. Köthen, 3 September 1727 – d. of smallpox, Köthen, 6 September 1728).

== Death ==
The only son and heir of Leopold succumbed to smallpox in August 1728, and the prince's second daughter, who also contracted the disease, died in early September. Soon Leopold caught smallpox as well; on 17 November he played his violin for the last time and died two days later in Köthen, aged thirty-three.

With no surviving male heir, Leopold was succeeded by his brother Augustus Louis.

Leopold, Prince of Anhalt-Köthen House of Ascania Born: 28 November 1694 Died: 19 November 1728
Preceded by Emmanuel	Prince of Anhalt-Köthen; 1704–1728	Succeeded by Augustus Louis
