= Augustin Reinhard Stricker =

German baroque composer (1675 – between 1718 and 1723)

Augustin Reinhard Stricker (c. 1675 – between 1718 and 1723) was a German baroque composer, conductor and tenor singer. He was Johann Sebastian Bach's predecessor as Kapellmeister (music director) at the court of Leopold, Prince of Anhalt-Köthen and the dedicatee of Johann Mattheson's 1717 treatise Das beschützte Orchestre.

== Life and career ==
Little is known of Stricker's youth and personal life. The fact that he published a volume of Italian cantatas might indicate that he, like most aspiring composers of the era, probably spent considerable time studying in Italy. His first documented employment began in February 1702 when he was appointed to the post of Cammer-Musicus in the newly founded Hofkapelle (royal orchestra) of king Frederick I of Prussia in Berlin.

There, in 1705, he married the singer Catharina Elisabeth Müller, who would also be his professional partner for the remainder of his life; e.g., she also would be employed at the Köthen court. His first documented pasticcio, Sieg der Schönheit über die Helden (Triumph of Beauty over the Heroes), premiered at the Royal Prussian court in December 1706, celebrating the marriage of the Prussian crown prince, future king Frederick William I, and princess Sophia Dorothea of Hanover. While all the music is lost, the libretto, written by the Prussian Poet laureate Johann von Besser, indicates that Stricker wrote most of the music and also played the part of the god Neptune, so he probably had already earned a reputation as a capable singer and composer.

An opera entirely composed by Stricker, Alexanders und Roxanen Heyrath (The marriage of Alexander and Roxane), premiered in November 1708, celebrating Frederick I's marriage to princess Sophia Louise of Mecklenburg-Schwerin. Again, Besser wrote the libretto. Then 14-years-old Prince Leopold of Anhalt-Köthen played a minor part. The young Georg Philipp Telemann, already a renowned composer in his own right, attended the representation, and Mattheson probably was in the audience, as well.

According to contemporary custom, the orchestra was laid-off with the entire staff of the court following the death of Frederick I in 1713. Some of the now unemployed musicians would soon be hired by young Prince Leopold, who had just returned to Köthen after his Grand Tour in Italy. In 1714, he founded a Hofkapelle, and appointed Stricker to be its director (Kapellmeister). Stricker would hold this post for about three years. In 1715, he published a volume of six Italian cantatas.

In early 1717, Stricker resigned to relocate to the court of Saxe-Coburg, which then resided in Gotha. But he remained there for just a few months, as in July 1717, a new pasticcio Crudeltà consuma amore (Crudelty will consume love) was played at the Palatine court of Neuburg. The libretto labeled him Palatine Kapellmeister; however, this might have been an honorary title. In early 1718, another pasticcio, L'amicizia in terzo overo Il Dionigio (Friendship comes in threes or Dionysus) was premiered in Neuburg, which was probably his opus ultimum.

Shortly thereafter, he relocated to another Palatine residence, Heidelberg, where his son was baptized in December 1718 - incidentally, exactly a year after his now much higher esteemed successor, Johann Sebastian Bach, took office at the court of Köthen.

Stricker probably died a short time later; the date of his death remains unknown, though.

== Known works ==
- Sieg der Schönheit über die Helden (pasticcio), Berlin 1706
- Alexanders und Roxanen Heyrath (opera), Berlin 1708
- Opera Prima. Erster Theil, bestehend in 6 Italienischen Cantaten à voce sola, worzu Violino oder Hautbois Solo accompagniret. Componiret von Augustino Reinhardo Stricker, HochFürstl. Anhaltscher Capell-Meister. Cöthen: Anton Löffler 1715
- Crudeltà consuma amore (pasticcio), Neuburg 1717
- L'amicizia in terzo overo Il Dionigio (pasticcio) Neuburg 1718
- 1 concerto
- 4 sonatas
- cantatas
