= Köthen =

Town in Saxony-Anhalt, Germany

- Town
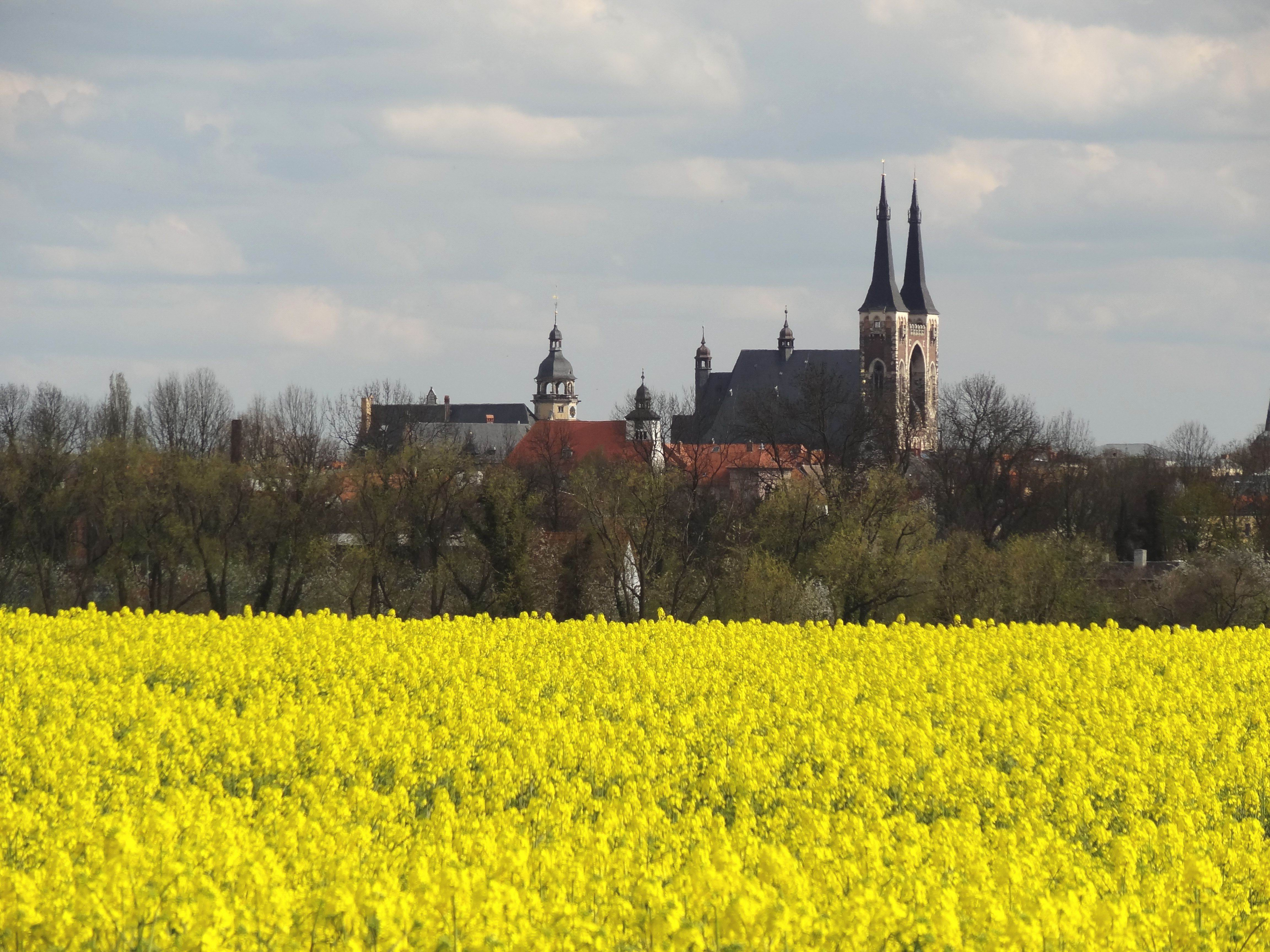
- Skyline

- Coat of arms

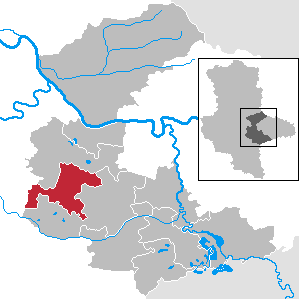
- Location of Köthen within Anhalt-Bitterfeld district
- Interactive map of Köthen
- Location within Germany Location within Saxony-Anhalt
- Coordinates: 51°45′04″N 11°58′25″E
- Country: Germany
- State: Saxony-Anhalt
- District: Anhalt-Bitterfeld

Government
  - Mayor (2023–30): Christina Buchheim (Left)

Area
  - Total: 78.42 km^{2} (30.28 sq mi)
- Elevation: 80 m (260 ft)

Population (2025-12-31)
  - Total: 23,831
  - Density: 303.9/km^{2} (787.1/sq mi)
- Time zone: UTC+01:00 (CET)
  - Summer (DST): UTC+02:00 (CEST)
- Postal codes: 06366
- Dialling codes: 03496
- Vehicle registration: ABI, AZE, BTF, KÖT, ZE
- Website: koethen-anhalt.de

Köthen ([ˈkøːtn̩]) is a town in Germany. It is the capital of the district of Anhalt-Bitterfeld in Saxony-Anhalt, about 30 km (19 mi) north of Halle.

Köthen is the location of the main campus and the administrative centre of the regional university, Anhalt University of Applied Sciences/Hochschule Anhalt which is especially strong in information technology. The city is conveniently located at the hub of the Magdeburg–Leipzig, Dessau–Köthen and Köthen–Aschersleben railways.

Köthen is situated in a fertile area with rich black soil suitable to the cultivation of sugar-beets. Industry includes high-tech engineering, manufacture of cranes, as well as chemicals, printing, and foodstuffs.

In English, the name of the city is often spelt anachronistically as Cöthen, a practice that has become standard in the literature relating to the life and work of Johann Sebastian Bach, who resided and worked there from 1717 to 1723.

== History ==
Owing to the fertile soil of the region, the area of Köthen is unusually rich in archaeological discoveries. The earliest signs of human habitation date from the early Stone Age about 250,000 years ago and evidence of every succeeding historical period may be found in the collections of the local Prehistorical Museum.

The first documentary mention of "Cothene" dates to 1115; by 1194 it was already known as a market town, becoming a seat of the princes of Anhalt. Köthen was chartered in 1200. For over two centuries (1603–1847) it was the capital of the independent principality (from 1806, duchy) of Anhalt-Köthen.

Map of Köthen (c. 1770)

The town has long been known to classical music enthusiasts as the place of origin of Johann Sebastian Bach's best-known secular works, including the Brandenburg concertos and the Well-Tempered Clavier. Bach worked in Köthen from 1717 to 1723 as Kapellmeister for Prince Leopold von Anhalt-Köthen. It is also the birthplace of the composer Carl Friedrich Abel who, together with Johann Christian Bach, founded the popular "Bach-Abel Concerts" in London, the first subscription concerts in England.

Schloss Köthen has been fully restored except for a small side wing bombed in 1944. Its Hall of Mirrors where Bach's music is now often performed is a popular attraction. It can be seen on DVD in the Freiburg Baroque Orchestra's recording of the Brandenburg concertos. Since 1967 a bi-annual Bach Festival has been held at Köthen, in the various halls of the palace as well as the local churches. Another concert hall was opened in 2008 in the palace complex.

Samuel Hahnemann, the founder of homoeopathy, practised in Köthen from 1821 to 1834, and during this period he published many of his best-known works. In 1855 his disciple Arthur Lutze opened a palatial homoeopathic clinic. Hahnemann's home is now open to tourists, and includes an actual working homoeopathic practice. The city has become the national center of homeopathy, location of congresses, and the seat of the new European Homeopathic Library. In 2013, the international homoeopathic medical society, Liga Medicorum Homoeopathica Internationalis, relocated its main operations to Köthen, so the city now is kind of a "world's capital of homoeopathy".

The pioneering ornithologist Johann Friedrich Naumann was born near Köthen and was employed at the ducal court for more than two decades (c. 1810-1835). His well-renowned collection of almost 1300 specimens and drawings of European birds is now the main part of an ornithological museum that is also situated in the palace.

== Geography ==
=== Location ===
Köthen located to the south of Magdeburg, north of Halle, west of Dessau and east of Bernburg (Saale).

In the north of the Anhalt-Bitterfeld district begins the Middle Elbe Biosphere Reserve. The Ziethe flows through the north part of the town.

=== Divisions ===
The town Köthen consists of Köthen proper and the following Ortschaften or municipal divisions:

- Arensdorf
- Baasdorf
- Dohndorf
- Löbnitz an der Linde
- Merzien
- Wülknitz

Arensdorf, Baasdorf, Dohndorf, Löbnitz an der Linde and Wülknitz were independent municipalities until they were incorporated by Köthen in January 2004. Merzien became part of Köthen in August 1994.

== Main sights ==
- St. Jakob Church (~1400), with baptismal font designed by Bertel Thorvaldsen; crypt with sarcophagi of the reigning princes; organ by Friedrich Ladegast (1872); the towers were added in the late 19th century; site where the funerary services were held for prince Leopold on 23 and 24 March 1729 at which Johann Sebastian Bach performed his Cantata Klagt, Kinder, klagt es aller Welt, BWV 244a.
- St. Agnus Church (~1699), where Johann Sebastian Bach worshipped. "Last Supper" by Lucas Cranach the Younger (1565); donor portrait by Antoine Pesne (1713); organ by Wilhelm Rühlmann
- Catholic St. Mary Church (~1830), built by Gottfried Bandhauer, it is one of the most prominent sacral buildings of the 19th century in northern Germany; organ by Anton Feith (1872–1929); crypt with the sarcophagus of the last reigning duke of Anhalt-Köthen
- Schloss Köthen, palace of the reigning princes (the main structure was built 1597–1660, with additions in the 18th century), now a museum — features a Versailles-style Hall of Mirrors (1722), the music school and the former ducal chapel as well as the actual rooms where much of J. S. Bach's secular music was first performed.
- Naumann Museum of ornithology and Prehistorical Museum, situated in different wings of the palace.
- Zoo (Tierpark Köthen) and city parks
- Historical Museum for city and district.
- City hall, the main part of which was built in the early 20th century
- remnants of the medieval city wall with two prominent towers at the former gates to Halle and Magdeburg, respectively
- Bach House, now a seniors residence
- Homes of Eichendorff and Hahnemann
- Monuments to prince Ludwig I, J.S. Bach, Hahnemann, Naumann, Angelika Hartmann, Fritz Weineck, and Yuri Gagarin.
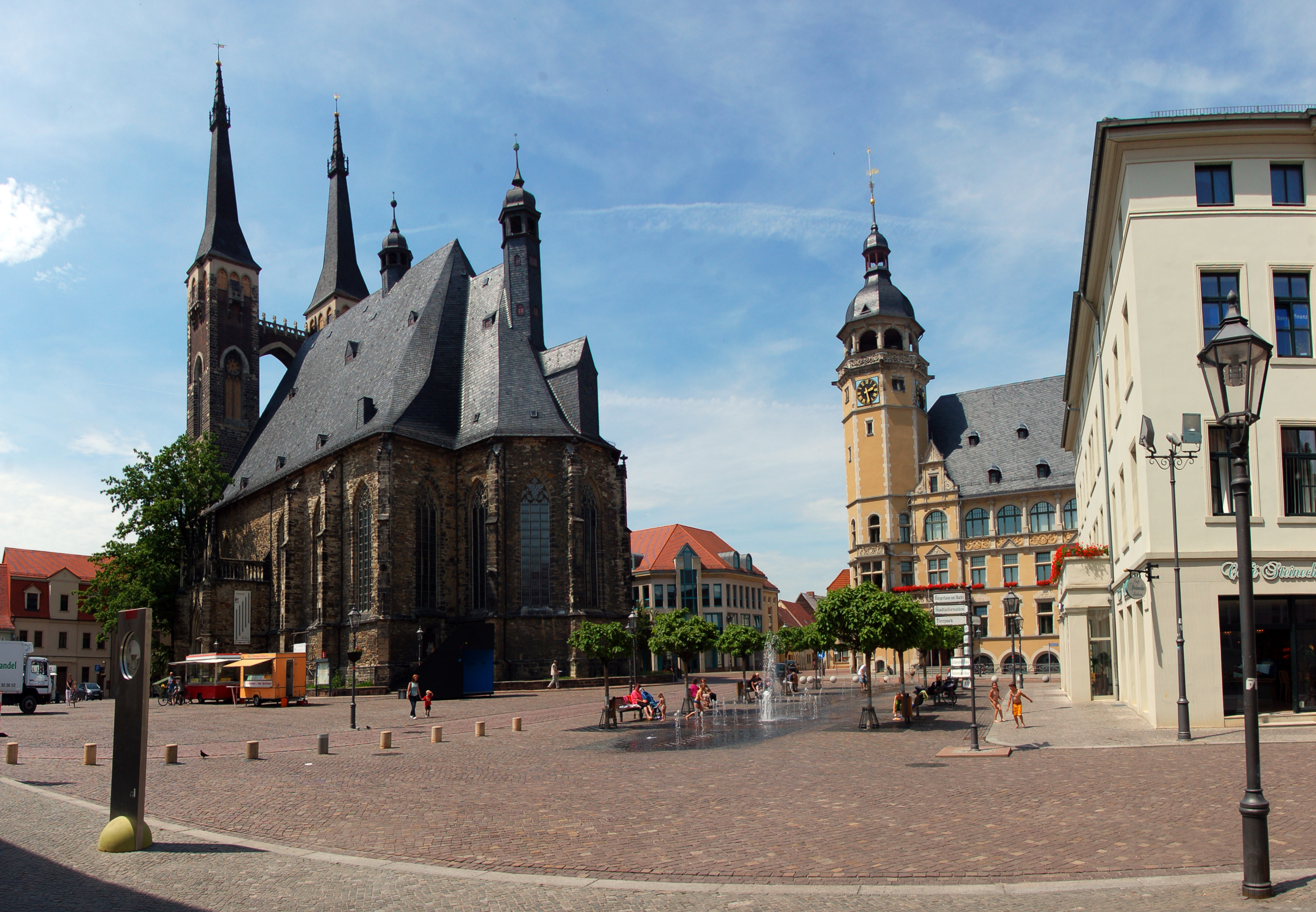
Market square with Church of St. Jakob and Townhall

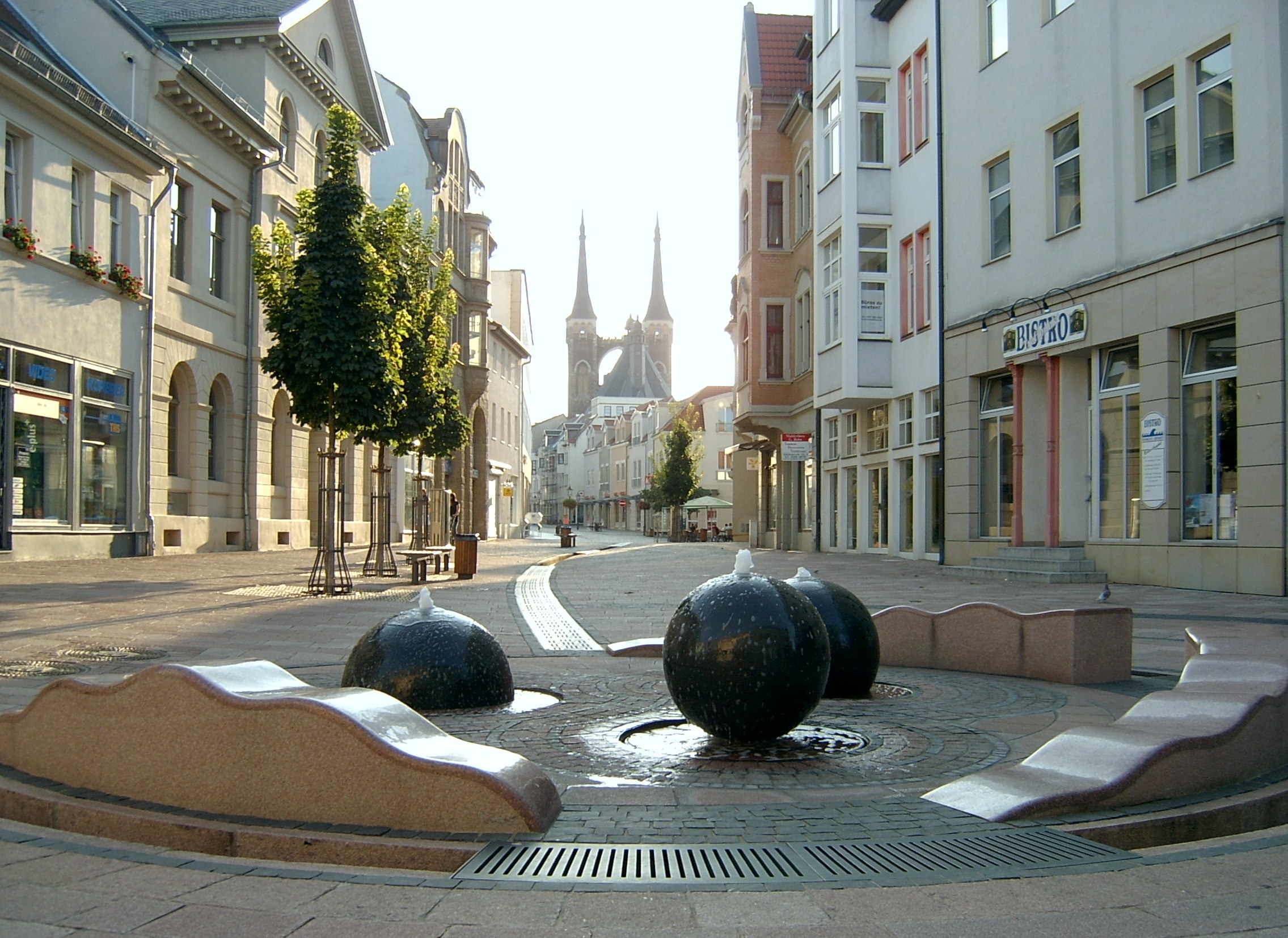
Boulevard

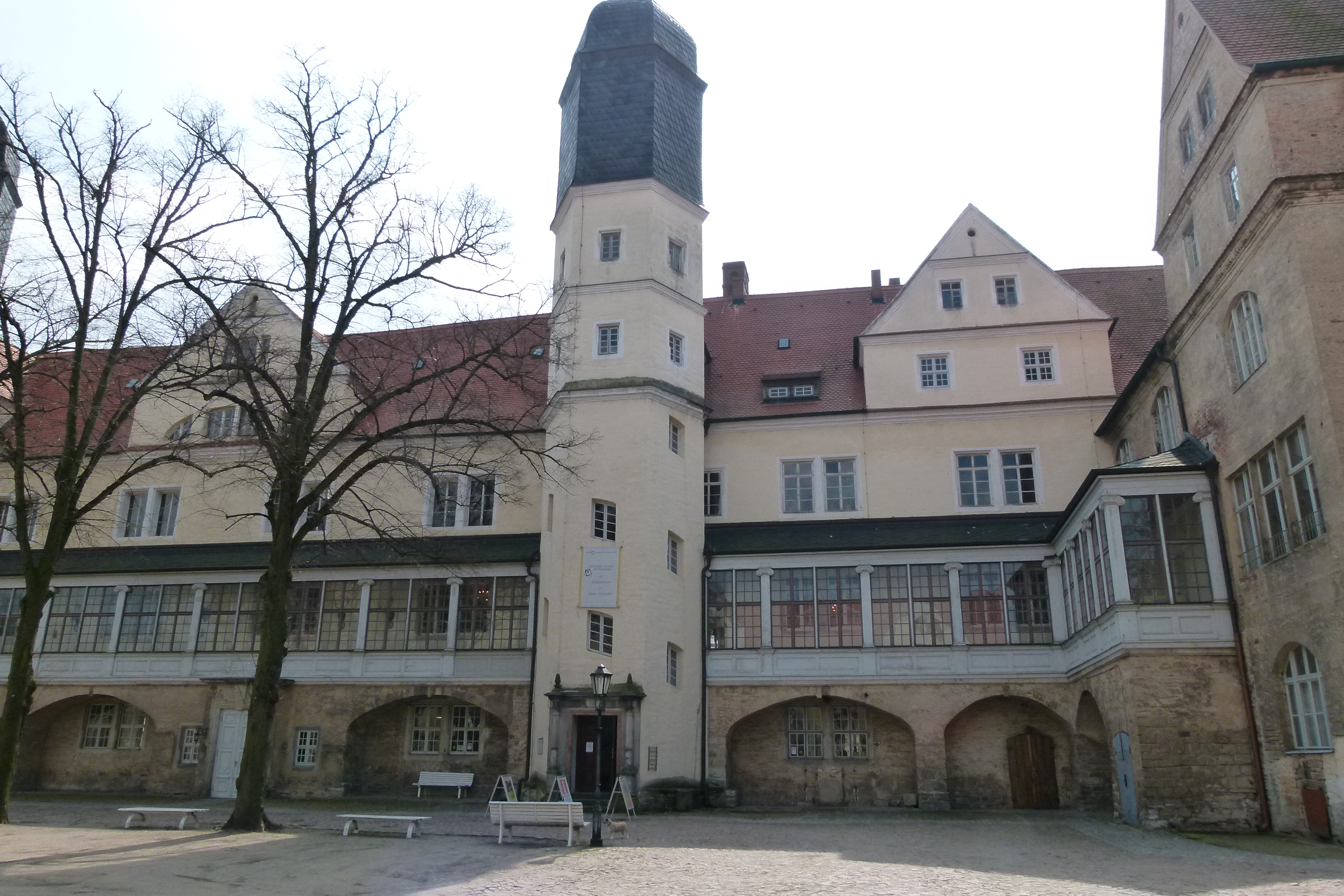
The southern wing of the palace (Ludwigsbau). It holds the Hall of Mirrors and the chapel.

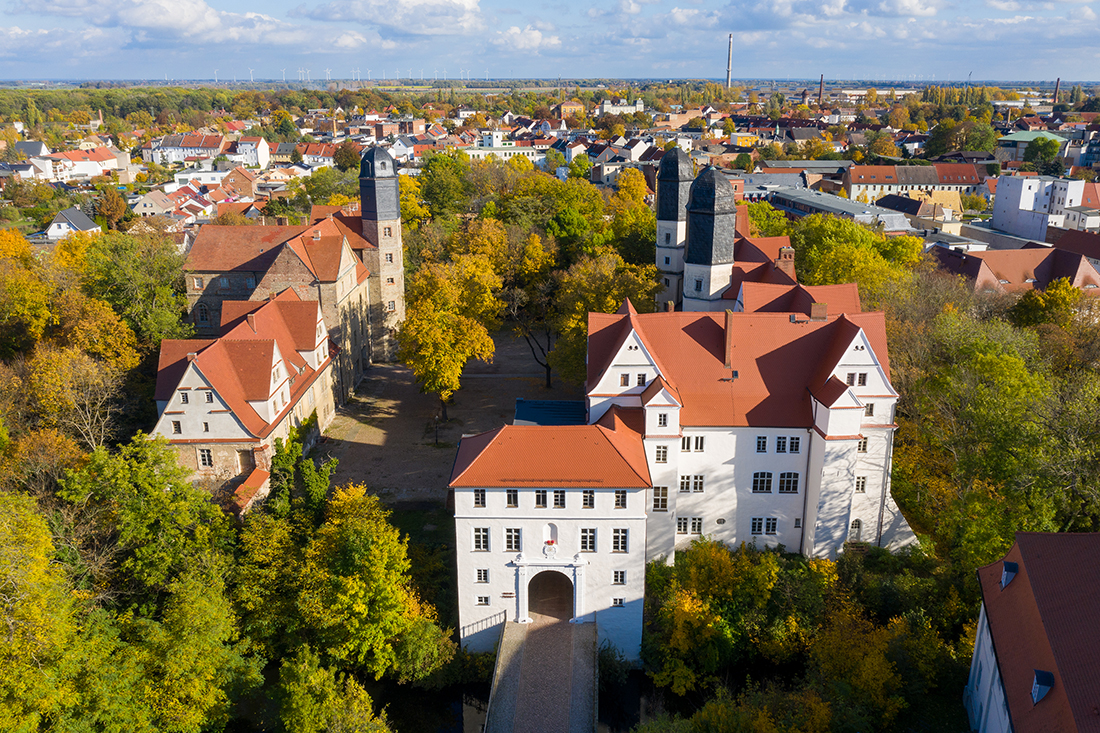
Palace from the air

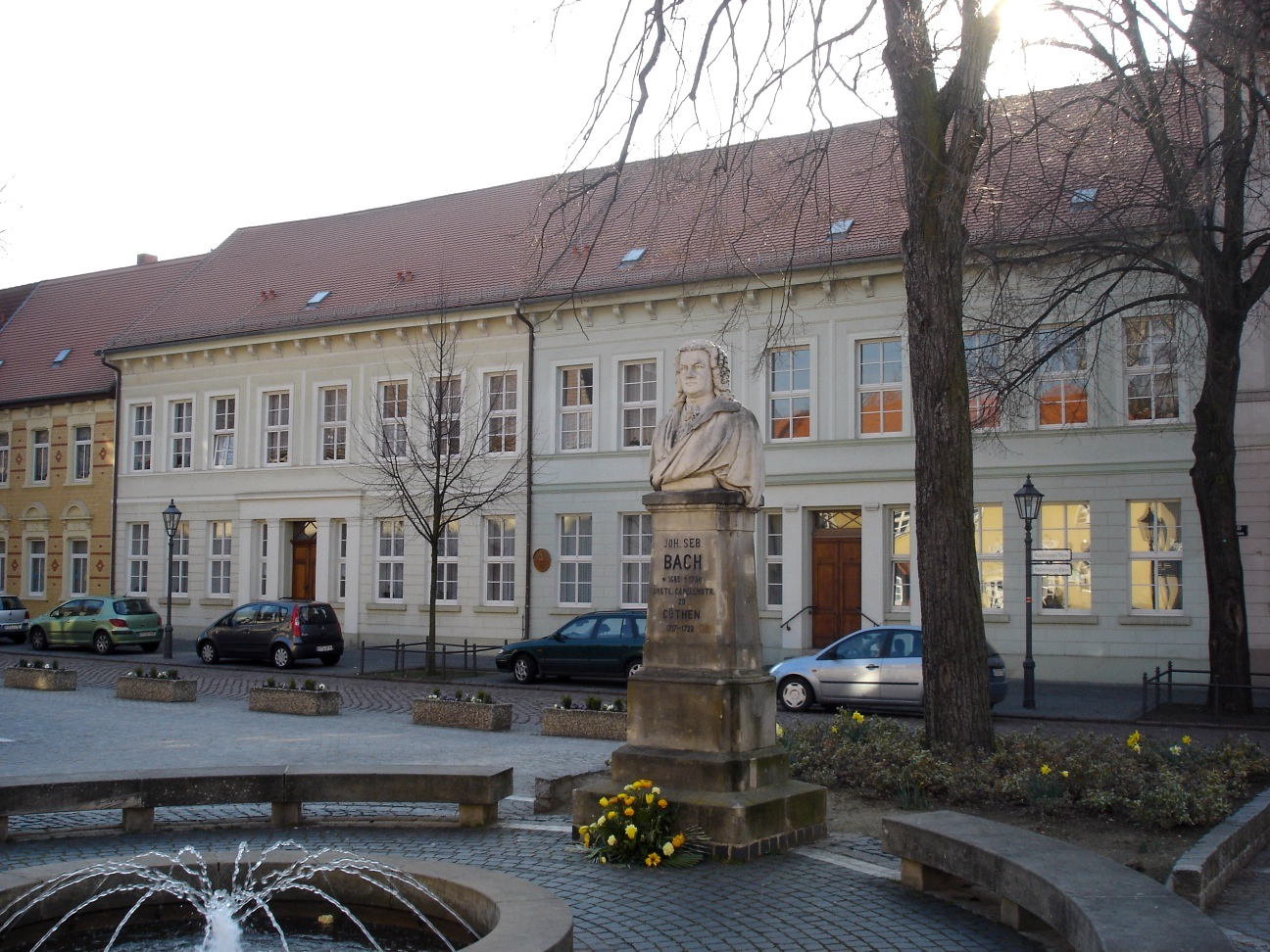
Monument of J.S. Bach in front of his home from 1719 to 1723

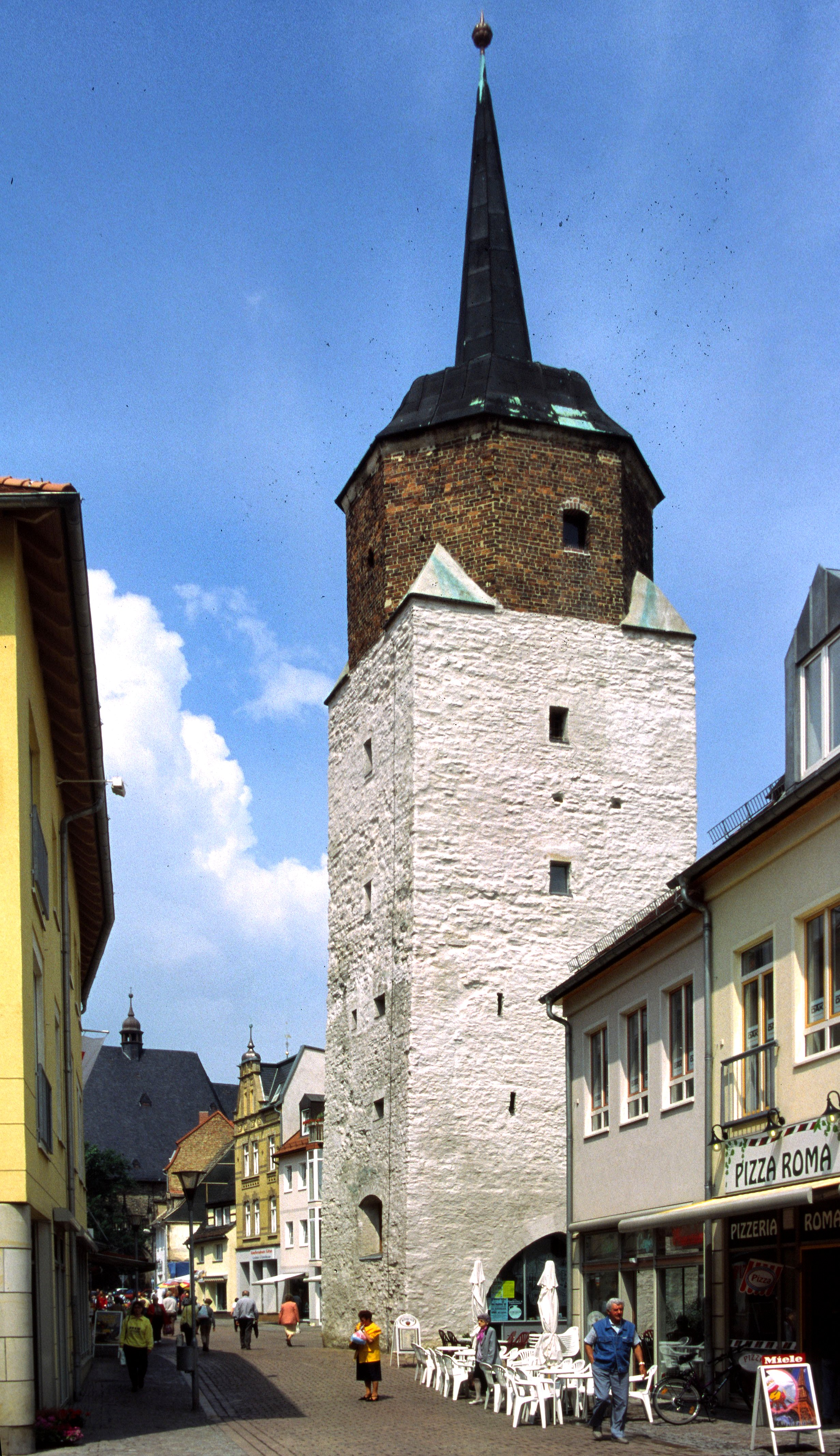
The tower guarding the southern gate (to Halle) was built in the 15th century and renovated in 1995.

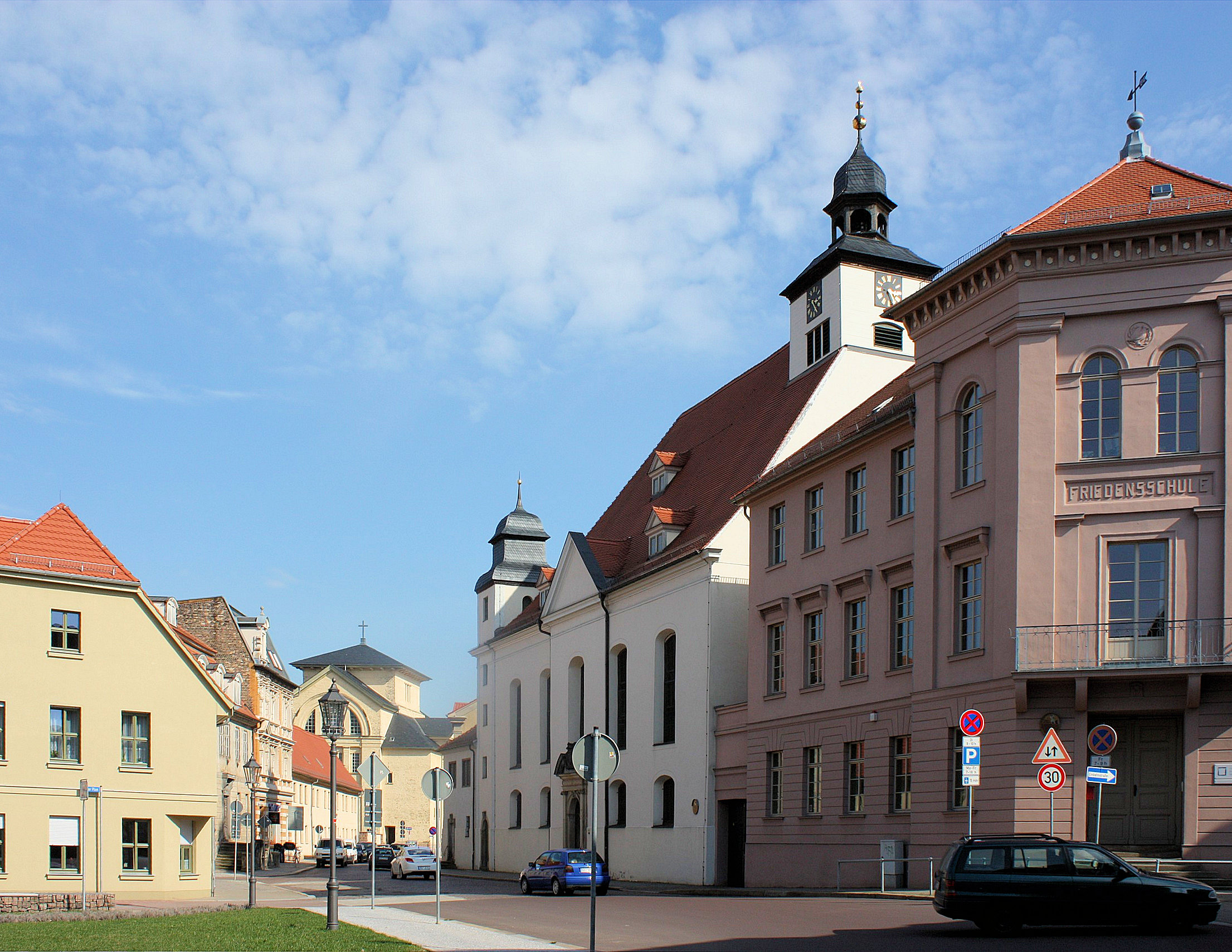
St. Agnus church

== Notable people ==
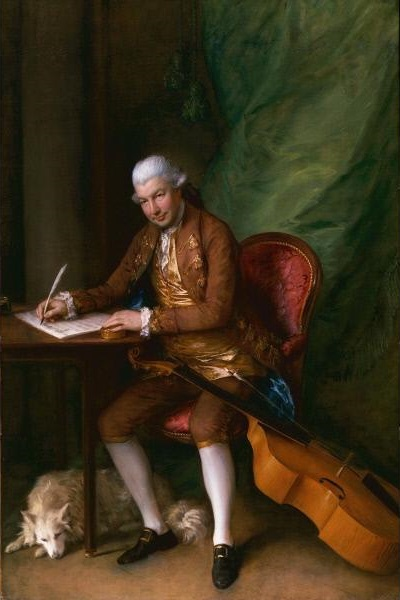
Carl Friedrich Abel by Thomas Gainsborough, 1777

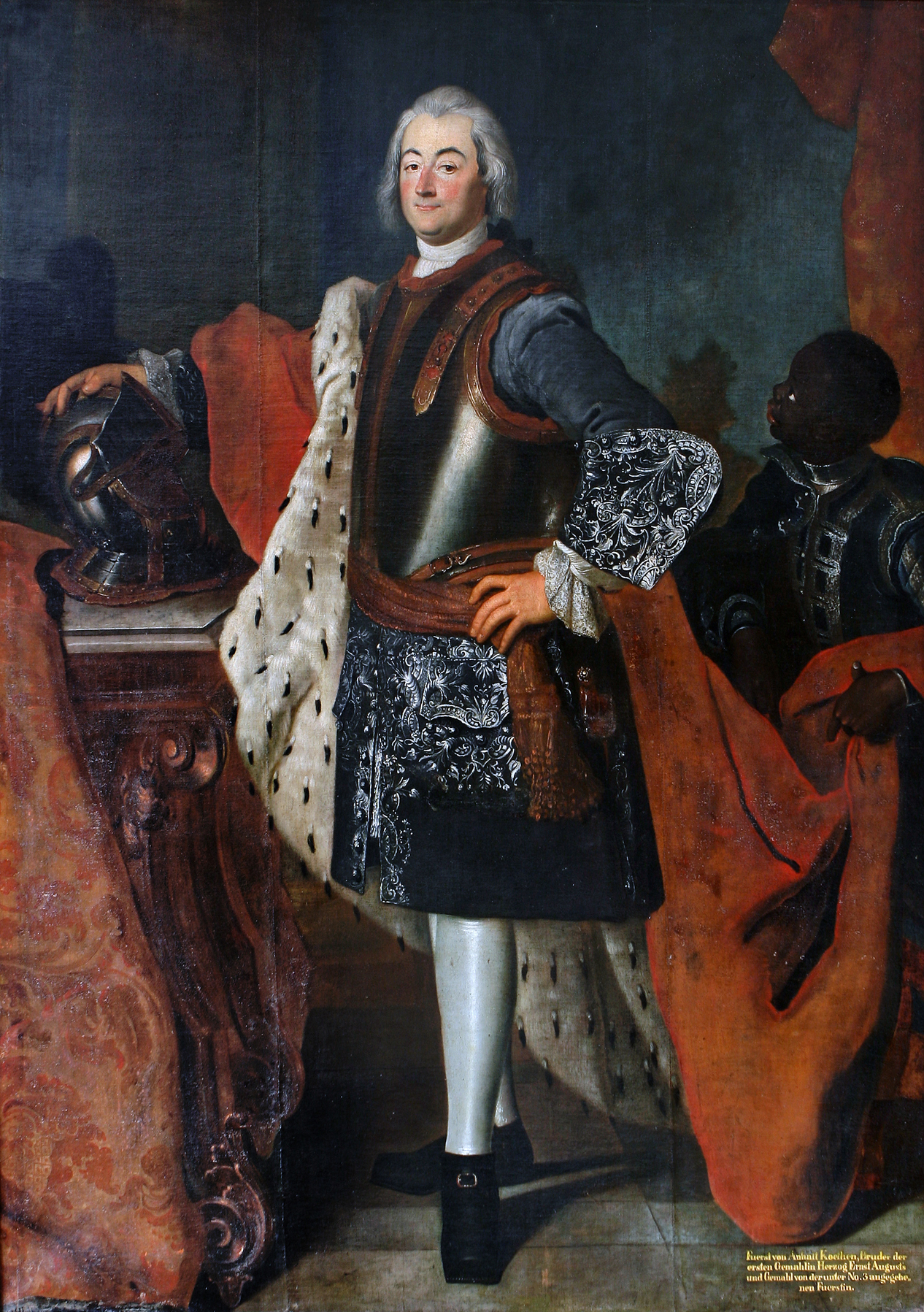
Prince Leopold by an unknown painter, c. 1725

- Wolfgang (1492–1566), prince of Anhalt-Köthen, Protestant reformer of the principalities of Anhalt
- Nicolaus Gallus (1516–1570), Protestant reformer
- Ludwig I (1579–1650), prince of Anhalt-Köthen, co-founder of the Fruitbearing Society
- Johann Friedrich Schweitzer (1625–1709), physician
- Gisela Agnes (1669–1740), princess consort of Anhalt-Köthen, regent in lieu of her son Leopold, 1704–1715
- Leopold (1694–1728), prince of Anhalt-Köthen, employer of J.S. Bach
- Carl Friedrich Abel (1723–1787), composer
- Leberecht Uhlich (1799–1872), theologian
- Hans Hermann Behr (1818–1904), physician and entomologist
- Julius Naue (1835–1907), painter and archeologist
- Eduard von Rindfleisch (1836–1908), pathologist
- August Klughardt (1847–1902), composer and conductor
- Georg Krause (1849–1927), founder of the influential journal of chemical science, Chemiker-Zeitung
- Werner Haase (1900–1950), Hitler's personal physician
- Walter Rauff (1906–1984), NSDAP-politician and participant of the Nazi eugenics crimes
- Theo Fitzau (1923–1982), racing driver
- Manfred Wekwerth (1929–2014), stage and film director
- Gerhard Thielcke (1931–2007), ornithologist
- Michael Naumann (born 1941), journalist, German federal Secretary of culture (1998–2001)
- Roland Brückner (born 1955), gymnast
- Franziska Hildebrand (born 1987), biathlete

== Twin towns – sister cities ==
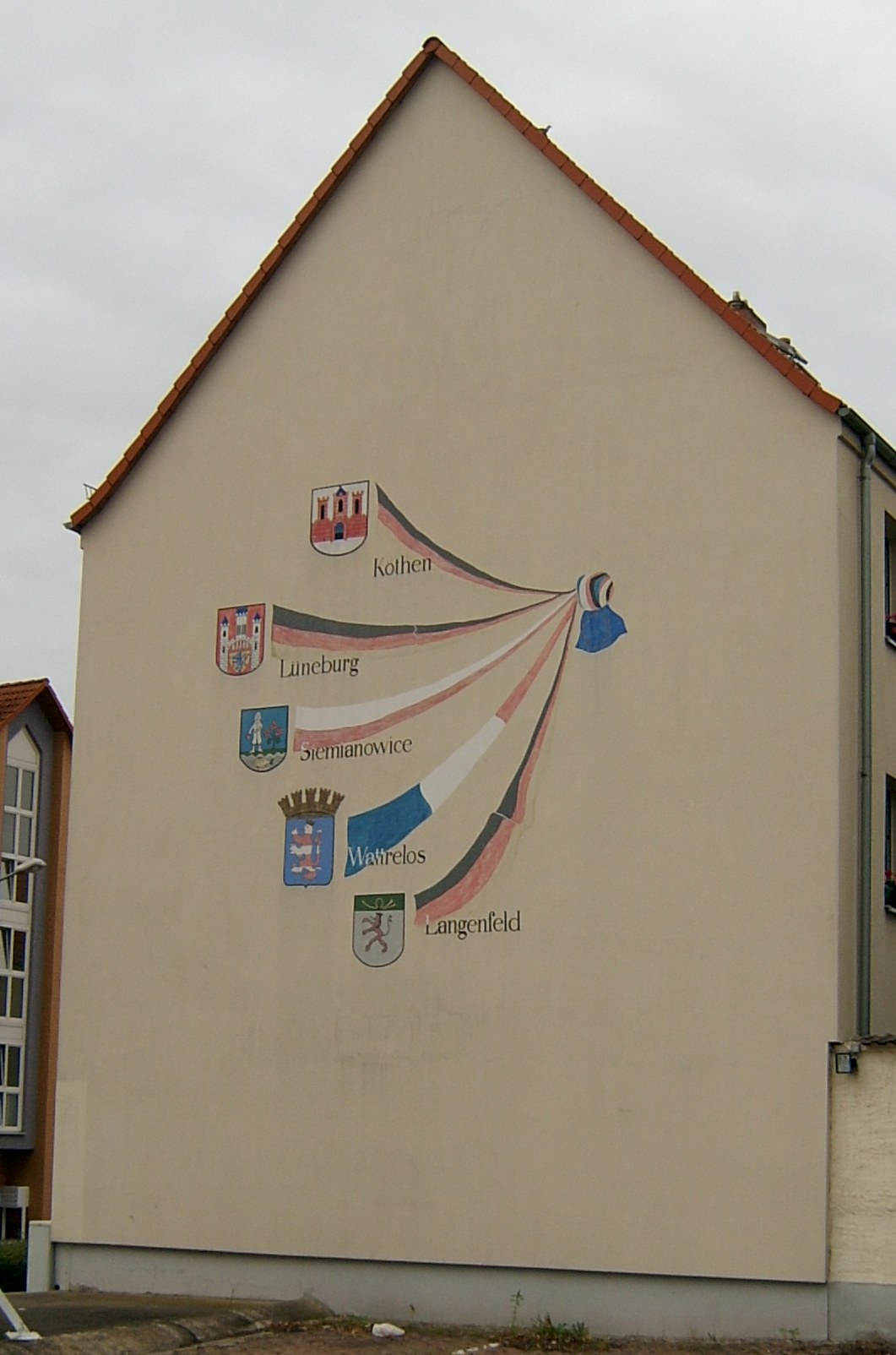
A mural depicting the twin towns

Köthen is twinned with:

- Siemianowice Śląskie, Poland (1993)
- Wattrelos, France (1990)

Köthen also has friendly relations with:

- Langenfeld, Germany (1990)
- Lüneburg, Germany (1990)
