= List of consorts of Anhalt =

List of consorts of Anhalt contains all consorts of the Central European land of Anhalt, across its various incarnations states, from the conquest of the region from the 13th century until the dissolution of the German Empire in 1918, of which Anhalt was a constituent state by that point.

== Countess of Anhalt ==
Picture	Name	Father	Birth	Marriage	Became Countess	Ceased to be Countess	Death	Spouse
	Matilda of Swabia	Herman II, Duke of Swabia (Conradines)	c. 998/9	c.1026			1030/4	Esico
	Eilika of Saxony	Magnus, Duke of Saxony (Billung)	c. 1080	Bef 1095			16 January 1142	Otto
	Sophie of Winzenburg	Herman I, Count of Winzenburg (House of Formbach)	1105	Abt 1125		6 or 7 July 1160		Albert
								Bernhard
	Irmgard of Thuringia	Hermann I, Landgrave of Thuringia (Ludovingians)	Abt 1197	Abt 1211	1212 husband's accession	1218 elevated to Princess	Abt 1244	Henry I
Partitioned between Anhalt-Aschersleben, Anhalt-Bernburg, and Anhalt-Zerbst in 1252.

== Princess of Anhalt ==
=== Princess of Anhalt-Aschersleben ===
Picture	Name	Father	Birth	Marriage	Became Princess	Ceased to be Princess	Death	Spouse
	Matilda of Brunswick-Lüneburg	Otto I, Duke of Brunswick-Lüneburg (House of Welf)	?	1245		12 June 1266 husband's death	1295/1298	Henry II
	Hedwig of Silesia	Henry III the White (Piast)	1252/1256	1283		14 December 1300		Otto I co-regent
	Elisabeth of Meissen	Frederick Clem (Wettin)	?	1309		24 July 1315	Aft 1347	Otto II

=== Princess of Anhalt-Bernburg, 1252–1468 ===
Picture	Name	Father	Birth	Marriage	Became Princess	Ceased to be Princess	Death	Spouse
	Sophie of Denmark	Abel, King of Denmark (Estridsen)	1240	1258		aft. 1284		Bernhard I
	Helena of Rügen	Vitslav II, Prince of Rügen (Rügen)	b. 1270	27 December 1302		9 August 1315		Bernhard II co-regent
	Agnes of Saxe-Wittenberg	Rudolf I, Duke of Saxe-Wittenberg (Ascania)	c. 1310	1328		4 January 1338		Bernhard III
	Matilda of Anhalt-Zerbst	Albert I, Prince of Anhalt-Zerbst (Ascania)	?	1339		c.1342		Bernhard III
	Mathilde of Brunswick-Lüneburg	Magnus I, Duke of Brunswick-Lüneburg (Welf)	?	1343		20 August 1348 husband's death	aft. 28 June 1354	Bernhard III
	Sophie							Henry IV
	Lutrud of Mansfeld	Gebhard IV, Count of Mansfeld (Mansfeld)				27 February 1404 husband's death	Aft 1426	Otto III
	Elisabeth of Honstein	Ulrich III, Count of Honstein-Kelbra (Hohnstein)	?	8 September 1396	1404 husband's accession	24 June 1420 husband's death	c.1426	Bernhard V co-regent
	Hedwig of Żagań	Jan I of Żagań (Piast)	c.1410					Bernhard VI
At Bernhard VI' death, His kinsman George I, Prince of Anhalt-Dessau, inherited his lands.

=== Princess of Anhalt-Zerbst, 1252–1396 ===
Picture	Name	Father	Birth	Marriage	Became Princess	Ceased to be Princess	Death	Spouse
	Catherine Birgersdotter	Birger Jarl (Bjälbo)	1245	17 October 1259		1289		Siegfried I
	Agnes of Brandenburg	Conrad, Margrave of Brandenburg-Stendal (Ascania)	?	1300		17 August 1316 husband's death	4 June 1330	Albert I
	Agnes of Rügen	Vitslav III, Prince of Rügen (Rügen)	?	2 September 1324		bef. 25 January 1337		Albert II co-regent
	Beatrix of Saxe-Wittenberg	Rudolf I, Duke of Saxe-Wittenberg (Ascania)	?	c.1337		aft. 26 February 1345		Albert II co-regent
	Elisabeth of Saxe-Wittenberg	Rudolf I, Duke of Saxe-Wittenberg (Ascania)	?	22 June 1344		aft. 30 May 1351		Waldemar I co-regent
	Beatrice d'Este	Obizzo III d'Este, Marquis of Ferrara (House of Este)	18 Sep 1332	c. 1365		7 January 1368 husband's death	1387	Waldemar I co-regent
	Elisabeth of Henneberg-Schleusingen	John I, Count of Henneberg-Schleusingen (Henneberg-Schleusingen)	1351	c.1366		11 April 1382 husband's death	24 April 1397	John II
	Jutta of Querfurt	Gebhard XI, Count of Querfurt (Querfurt)	c.1370	1386		1405	1410	Sigismund I

=== Princess of Anhalt-Dessau, 1603-1807 ===
Picture	Name	Father	Birth	Marriage	Became Princess	Ceased to be Princess	Death	Spouse
	Countess Palatine Dorothea of Simmern	John Casimir of the Palatinate-Simmern (Wittelsbach)	6 January 1581	21 February 1595	1603; Anhalt-Dessau recreated	24 May 1618 husband's death	19 September 1631	John George I
	Agnes of Hesse-Kassel	Maurice, Landgrave of Hesse-Kassel (Hesse-Kassel)	14 May 1606	18 May 1623		28 May 1650		John Casimir
	Sophie Margarete of Anhalt-Bernburg	Christian I, Prince of Anhalt-Bernburg (Ascania)	16 September 1615	14 July 1651		15 September 1660	27 December 1673	John Casimir
	Countess Henriette Catherine of Nassau	Frederick Henry, Prince of Orange (Orange-Nassau)	10 February 1637	9 September 1659	15 September 1660 husband's accession	7 August 1693 husband's death	3 November 1708	John George II, Prince of Anhalt-Dessau
	Anna Louise Föhse	Rudolf Föhse	22 March 1677	1698		5 February 1745		Leopold I, Prince of Anhalt-Dessau
	Gisela Agnes of Anhalt-Köthen	Leopold, Prince of Anhalt-Köthen (House of Ascania)	21 September 1722	25 May 1737	7 April 1747 husband's accession	20 April 1751		Leopold II
	Margravine Louise of Brandenburg-Schwedt	Frederick Henry, Margrave of Brandenburg-Schwedt (Hohenzollern)	24 September 1750	25 July 1767		1807; Principality elevated to the rank of Duchy	21 December 1811	Leopold III

=== Princess of Anhalt-Bernburg, 1603–1807 ===
Picture	Name	Father	Birth	Marriage	Became Princess	Ceased to be Princess	Death	Spouse
	Anna of Bentheim-Tecklenburg	Arnold III, Count of Bentheim-Steinfurt-Tecklenburg-Limburg (Bentheim-Steinfurt)	3 January 1579	2 July 1595	1603; Principality (re-)created	9 December 1624		Christian I
	Eleonore Sophie of Schleswig-Holstein-Sonderburg	John II, Duke of Schleswig-Holstein-Sonderburg (Oldenburg)	24 February 1603	28 February 1624	17 April 1630 husband's accession	22 September 1656 husband's death	5 January 1675	Christian II
	Elizabeth of Palatinate-Zweibrücken	Frederick, Count Palatine of Zweibrücken (Wittelsbach)	22 March 1642	16 October 1667		18 April 1677		Victor Amadeus
	Louise of Anhalt-Dessau	Leopold I, Prince of Anhalt-Dessau (Ascania)	21 August 1709	25 November 1724		29 July 1732		Victor Frederick
	Albertine of Brandenburg-Schwedt	Margrave Albert Frederick of Brandenburg-Schwedt (Hohenzollern)	21 April 1712	22 May 1733		7 September 1750		Victor Frederick
	Louise Albertine of Schleswig-Holstein-Sonderburg-Plön	Frederick Charles, Duke of Schleswig-Holstein-Sonderburg-Plön (Oldenburg)	21 July 1748	4 June 1763	18 May 1765	2 March 1769		Frederick Albert
	Marie Friederike of Hesse-Kassel	William I, Elector of Hesse (Hesse)	14 September 1768	29 November 1794	9 April 1796 husband's accession	1807; Principality elevated to the rank of Duchy	17 April 1839	Alexius Frederick Christian

==== Princess of Anhalt-Harzgerode, 1635–1709 ====
Picture	Name	Father	Birth	Marriage	Became Princess	Ceased to be Princess	Death	Spouse
	Johanna Elisabeth of Nassau-Hadamar	John Louis of Nassau-Hadamar (Nassau-Hadamar)	7 January 1619	10 August 1642		2 March 1647		Frederick
	Anna Katharina of Lippe-Detmold	Simon VII, Count of Lippe (House of Lippe)	31 July 1612	26 May 1657		15 October 1659		Frederick
	Elisabeth Juliane Solms-Laubach	Albert Otto II, Count of Solms-Laubach (Solms-Laubach)	6 March 1631	25 July 1671		2 January 1693		William Louis
	Sophie Auguste of Nassau-Dillenburg	Henry, Prince of Nassau-Dillenburg (Nassau-Dillenburg)	28 April 1666	20 October 1695		14 October 1709 husband's death	14 January 1733	William Louis

=== Anhalt-Bernburg-Schaumburg-Hoym ===
==== Princess of Anhalt-Zeitz-Hoym (1718–1727) ====
Picture	Name	Father	Birth	Marriage	Became Princess	Ceased to be Princess	Death	Spouse
	Charlotte of Nassau-Schaumburg	Adolph, Prince of Nassau-Schaumburg (Nassau)	28 September 1673	12 April 1692	14 February 1718; Principality created	31 January 1700		Lebrecht
	Charlotte Louise of Isenburg-Büdingen-Birstein	William Maurice, Count of Isenburg-Büdingen-Birstein (Isenburg)	31 July 1680	22 November 1714	17 May 1727 husband's accession	1727; Principality changed its name to Anhalt-Bernburg-Schaumburg-Hoym	2 January 1739	Victor I

==== Princess of Anhalt-Bernburg-Schaumburg-Hoym (1727–1812) ====
Picture	Name	Father	Birth	Marriage	Became Princess	Ceased to be Princess	Death	Spouse
	Charlotte Louise of Isenburg-Büdingen-Birstein	William Maurice, Count of Isenburg-Büdingen-Birstein (Isenburg)	31 July 1680	22 November 1714	1727; Principality changed its name to Anhalt-Bernburg-Schaumburg-Hoym	2 January 1739		Victor I
	Hedwig Sophie Henckel of Donnersmarck	Count Wenzel Louis Henckel of Donnersmarck (Henckel von Donnersmarck)	7 May 1717	14 February 1740		15 April 1772	21 February 1795	Victor I
	Amalie Eleonore of Solms-Braunfels	Frederick William, Prince of Solms-Braunfels (Solms-Braunfels)	22 November 1734	12 December 1765	15 April 1772 husband's accession	20 August 1806 husband's death	19 April 1811	Charles Louis
	Amelia of Nassau-Weilburg	Charles Christian, Prince of Nassau-Weilburg (Nassau-Weilburg)	7 August 1776	29 October 1793	20 August 1806 husband's accession	22 April 1812 husband's death	19 February 1841	Victor II

=== Princess of Anhalt-Zerbst, 1544–1796 ===
Picture	Name	Father	Birth	Marriage	Became Princess	Ceased to be Princess	Death	Spouse
	Margarete of Brandenburg	Joachim I Nestor, Elector of Brandenburg (Hohenzollern)	c. 1511	15 February 1534		4 February 1551 husband's death	after 3 November 1577	John V
	Anna of Pomerania	Barnim XI, Duke of Pomerania (Greifen)	5 February 1531	16 May 1557		4 May 1561 husband's death	13 October 1592	Karl I
	Dorothea Hedwig of Brunswick-Wolfenbüttel	Henry Julius, Duke of Brunswick-Lüneburg (Welf)	3 February 1587	29 December 1605		16 October 1609		Rudolph
	Countess Magdalene of Oldenburg	John VII, Count of Oldenburg (Oldenburg)	6 October 1585	31 August 1612		30 July 1621 husband's death	14 April 1657	Rudolph
	Sophie Augusta of Holstein-Gottorp	Frederick III, Duke of Holstein-Gottorp (Holstein-Gottorp)	5 December 1630	16 September 1649		4 July 1667 husband's death	12 December 1680	John VI
	Duchess Sophia of Saxe-Weissenfels	Augustus, Duke of Saxe-Weissenfels (Wettin)	23 June 1654	18 June 1676		3 November 1718 husband's death	31 March 1724	Karl Wilhelm
	Duchess Hedwig Friederike of Württemberg-Weiltingen	Frederick Ferdinand, Duke of Württemberg-Weiltingen (Württemberg)	18 October 1691	8 October 1715	3 November 1718 husband's accession	7 November 1742 husband's death	14 August 1752	John Augustus
	Joanna Elisabeth of Holstein-Gottorp	Christian August of Holstein-Gottorp, Prince of Eutin (Holstein-Gottorp)	24 October 1712	8 November 1727	7 November 1742 husband's accession	16 March 1747 husband's death	30 May 1760	Christian August, Prince of Anhalt-Zerbst
	Princess Caroline Wilhelmina Sophia of Hesse-Kassel	Maximilian of Hesse-Kassel (Hesse-Kassel)	10 May 1732	17 November 1753		22 May 1759		Frederick Augustus
	Friederike Auguste Sophie of Anhalt-Bernburg	Victor Frederick, Prince of Anhalt-Bernburg (Anhalt-Bernburg)	28 August 1744	27 May 1764		3 March 1793	12 April 1827	Frederick Augustus

=== Princess of Anhalt-Köthen 1603–1806 ===
Picture	Name	Father	Birth	Marriage	Became Princess	Ceased to be Princess	Death	Spouse
	Princess Amöena Amalie of Bentheim-Tecklenburg	Arnold III, Count of Bentheim-Steinfurt-Tecklenburg-Limburg (Bentheim-Steinfurt)	19 March 1586	31 October 1606		8 September 1625		Louis I
	Countess Sophie of Lippe	Simon VI, Count of Lippe (Lippe)	16 August 1599	12 September 1626		7 January 1650 husband's death	19 March 1654	Louis I
	Elisabeth Charlotte of Anhalt-Harzgerode	Frederick, Prince of Anhalt-Harzgerode (Ascania)	11 February 1647	25 August 1663		13 April 1665	20 January 1723	William Louis
	Countess Sophie of Stolberg-Wernigerode	Henry Volrad, Count of Stolberg-Wernigerode (Stolberg-Wernigerode)	2 October 1628	18 January 1655	13 Aprile 1655 husband's accession	7 November 1669 husband's death	13 September 1675	Lebrecht co-ruler
	Anna Eleonore of Stolberg-Wernigerode	Henry Ernest, Count of Stolberg (Stolberg-Wernigerode)	20 July 1593	23 March 1670		8 November 1670	27 January 1690	Emmanuel co-ruler
	Frederica Henriette of Anhalt-Bernburg	Karl Frederick, Prince of Anhalt-Bernburg (Ascania)	24 January 1702	11 December 1721		4 April 1723		Leopold
	Charlotte Frederike of Nassau-Siegen	Frederick William Adolf, Prince of Nassau-Siegen (Nassu-Siegen)	30 November 1702	27 June 1725		19 November 1728	22 July 1785	Leopold
	Countess Emilie of Promnitz-Pless	Erdmann II, Count of Promnitz (Promnitz)	15 September 1708	14 January 1726	19 November 1728 husband's accession	20 February 1732		Augustus Louis
	Countess Anna Friederike of Promnitz-Pless	Erdmann II, Count of Promnitz (Promnitz)	30 May 1711	21 November 1732		31 March 1750		Augustus Louis
	Louise Charlotte of Schleswig-Holstein-Sonderburg-Glücksburg	Frederick, Duke of Schleswig-Holstein-Sonderburg-Glücksburg (Glücksburg)	5 March 1749	26 July 1763		17 October 1789	30 March 1812	Karl George Lebrecht
	Friederike of Nassau-Usingen	Frederick Augustus, Prince of Nassau-Usingen then Duke of Nassau (Nassau-Usingen)	30 August 1777	9 February 1792		1803 divorce	28 August 1821	Augustus Christian Frederick, Duke of Anhalt-Köthen

==== Princess of Anhalt-Pless, 1764-1847 ====
Picture	Name	Father	Birth	Marriage	Became Princess	Ceased to be Princess	Death	Spouse
	Countess Louise Ferdinande of Stolberg-Wernigerode	Henry Ernest of Stolberg-Wernigerode (Stolberg-Wernigerode)	30 September 1744	13 June 1766		3 February 1784		Frederick Erdmann
	Princess Luise of Schleswig-Holstein-Sonderburg-Beck	Friedrich Karl Ludwig, Duke of Schleswig-Holstein-Sonderburg-Beck (Oldenburg)	28 September 1783	20 August 1803		24 November 1803		Frederick Ferdinand
	Countess Julie of Brandenburg	Frederick William II of Prussia (Hohenzollern)	4 January 1793	20 May 1816		23 August 1830	29 January 1848	Frederick Ferdinand
	Princess Auguste Friederike Esperance Reuss of Köstritz	Heinrich XLIV, Prince Reuss of Köstritz (Reuss of Köstritz)	3 August 1794	18 May 1819	23 August 1830 husband's accession	23 November 1847 husband's death	13 July 1855	Henry
At Henry's death without issue, the principality of Pless, governed by Semi-Salic Law, passed to Henry's nephew Hans Henry X, Count of Hochberg-Fürstenstein.

== Duchess of Anhalt ==
=== Duchess of Anhalt-Bernburg, 1803–1863 ===
Picture	Name	Father	Birth	Marriage	Became Duchess	Ceased to be Duchess	Death	Spouse
	Marie Friederike of Hesse-Kassel	William I, Elector of Hesse (Hesse)	14 September 1768	29 November 1794	1807; Principality elevated to the rank of Duchy	1817 divorce	17 April 1839	Alexius Frederick Christian
	Friederike of Schleswig-Holstein-Sonderburg-Glücksburg	Friedrich Wilhelm, Duke of Schleswig-Holstein-Sonderburg-Glücksburg (Glücksburg)	9 October 1811	30 October 1834		19 August 1863	10 July 1902	Alexander Karl, Duke of Anhalt-Bernburg
At Alexander Karl's death without issue, the duchy was inherited by his kinsman Leopold IV, Duke of Anhalt-Dessau-Köthen who merged the duchy with his own to form a united Duchy of Anhalt.

=== Duchess of Anhalt-Köthen, 1806-1847 ===
Picture	Name	Father	Birth	Marriage	Became Princess	Ceased to be Princess	Death	Spouse
	Countess Julie of Brandenburg	Frederick William II of Prussia (Hohenzollern)	4 January 1793	20 May 1816	18 December 1818 husband's accession	23 August 1830 husband's death	29 January 1848	Frederick Ferdinand
	Princess Auguste Friederike Esperance Reuss of Köstritz	Heinrich XLIV, Prince Reuss of Köstritz (Reuss of Köstritz)	3 August 1794	18 May 1819	23 August 1830 husband's accession	23 November 1847 husband's death	13 July 1855	Henry
At Henry's death without issue, the duchy was inherited by his kinsman Leopold IV, Duke of Anhalt-Dessau.

=== Duchess of Anhalt-Dessau, 1807-1863 ===
Picture	Name	Father	Birth	Marriage	Became Duchess	Ceased to be Duchess	Death	Spouse
	Margravine Louise of Brandenburg-Schwedt	Frederick Henry, Margrave of Brandenburg-Schwedt (Hohenzollern)	24 September 1750	25 July 1767	1807; Principality elevated to the rank of Duchy	21 December 1811		Leopold III
	Princess Frederica Wilhelmina of Prussia	Prince Louis Charles of Prussia (Hohenzollern)	30 September 1796	18 April 1818		30 August 1863; Duchies united forming the Duchy of Anhalt	1 January 1850	Leopold IV

=== Duchess of Anhalt, 1863–1918 ===
Picture	Name	Father	Birth	Marriage	Became Duchess	Ceased to be Duchess	Death	Spouse
	Princess Antoinette of Saxe-Altenburg	Prince Eduard of Saxe-Altenburg (Wettin)	17 April 1838	22 April 1854	22 May 1871 husband's accession	24 January 1904 husband's death	13 October 1908	Frederick I
	Princess Marie of Baden	Prince William of Baden (Zähringen)	26 July 1865	2 July 1889	24 January 1904 husband's accession	21 April 1918 husband's death	29 November 1939	Frederick II
