= Louis, Prince of Anhalt-Pless =

German prince

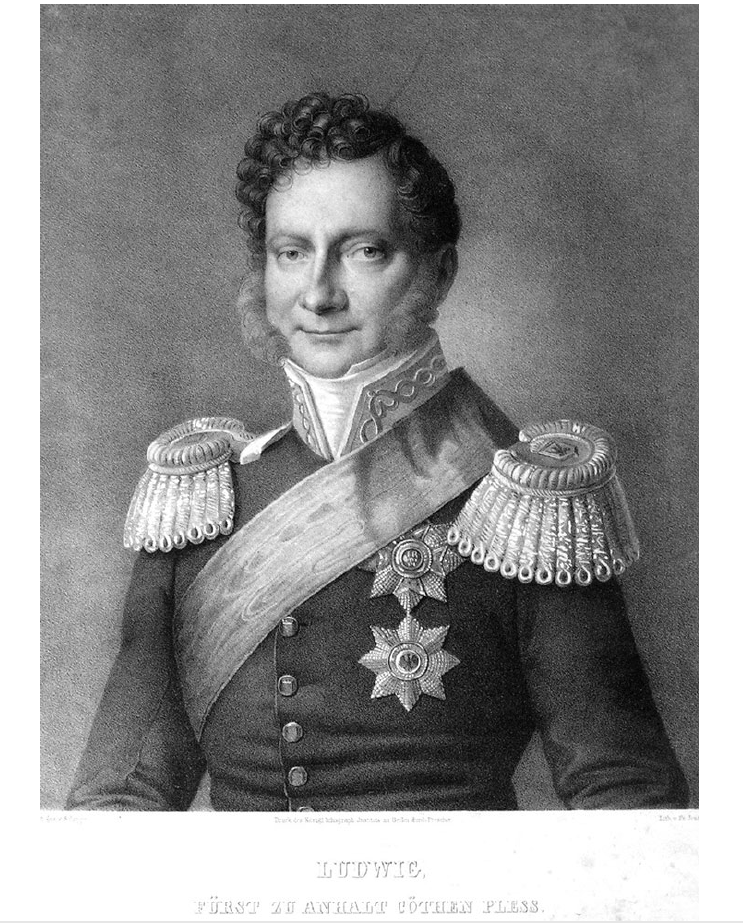
Louis of Anhalt-Pless

Louis of Anhalt-Pless (16 July 1783 in Pless – 5 November 1841 in Pless) was a German prince of the House of Ascania and ruler of the principality of Anhalt-Pless.

He was the sixth (but fifth surviving) son of Frederick Erdmann, Prince of Anhalt-Pless, by his wife Louise Ferdinande, daughter of Henry Ernest, Count of Stolberg-Wernigerode.

== Life ==
As the youngest child in his family, Louis had little prospect of ever taking part the government of Pless; but when the main line of the Anhalt-Köthen branch of the House of Ascania became extinct in 1818, his older brother Frederick Ferdinand assumed the title duke of Anhalt-Köthen and left the government of Pless in the hands of the next oldest brother Henry.

In 1830, Frederick Ferdinand died childless and Henry succeeded him as duke. Shortly after, he left the government of Pless in the hands of Louis. Because Henry was also childless, Louis became heir presumptive to the duchy of Anhalt-Köthen until his death, unmarried and also childless. After Louis's death, Henry reassumed his government over Pless until his own death.

Preceded by Henry	Prince of Anhalt-Pless; 1830–1841	Succeeded by Henry
