= Christian Ernest of Stolberg-Wernigerode =

German politician

Christian Ernest
- Count of Stolberg-Wernigerode
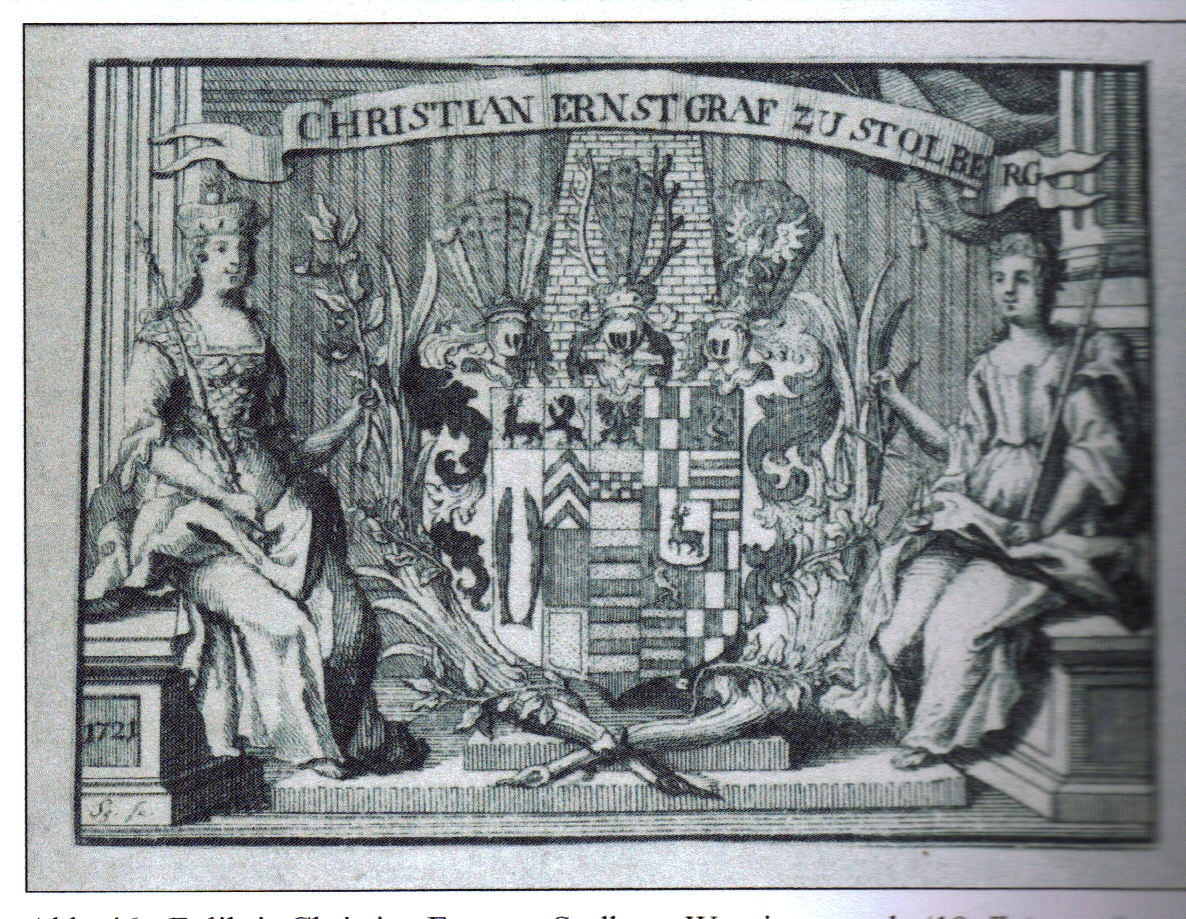
- Exlibris of Christian Ernst zu Stolberg-Wernigerode
- Born: 2 April 1691; Gedern
- Died: 25 October 1771 (aged 80); Wernigerode
- Noble family: House of Stolberg
- Spouses: Sophie Charlotte, Countess of Leiningen-Westerburg
- Issue: Henry Ernest of Stolberg-Wernigerode
- Father: Louis Christian, Count of Stolberg
- Mother: Christine of Mecklenburg-Güstrow

Christian Ernest of Stolberg-Wernigerode

Count of Wernigerode
- In office 1710–1771
- Preceded by: Ernest of Stolberg
- Succeeded by: Henry Ernest of Stolberg-Wernigerode

Secret Councillor of the Kingdom of Denmark

Personal details
- Born: 2 April 1691 Gedern
- Died: 25 October 1771 (aged 80) Wernigerode
- Spouse(s): Sophie Charlotte, Countess of Leiningen-Westerburg
- Occupation: German politician

Christian Ernest, Count of Stolberg-Wernigerode, (2 April 1691, Gedern – 25 October 1771, Wernigerode) was a German politician and a member of the House of Stolberg. From 1710 to 1771 he governed County of Wernigerode in the Harz mountains, which in 1714 became a dependency of the Kingdom of Prussia.

== Life ==
Christian Ernest was the tenth child from the second marriage of Count (Graf) Louis Christian of Stolberg. His mother was Christine, daughter of Gustav Adolf, Duke of Mecklenburg-Güstrow.

In accordance with his father's last will and testament of 23 January 1699, Christian Ernest was to inherit the County of Wernigerode, which until that point had been governed by his uncle, Count Ernest of Stolberg; the Hohnstein Forest south of Benneckenstein; and the claim for the mortgaged district (Amt) Elbingerode (Harz). After his father's death in 1710, Christian Ernest entered into his inheritance under the regency of his mother and called himself from then on Graf zu Stolberg-Wernigerode. He moved the county seat of Ilsenburg back to Wernigerode, arranging to have Wernigerode Castle renovated and modernized.

In a 1714 settlement (Rezess), Christian Ernest was forced to recognize the sovereignty of Brandenburg-Prussia over the County of Wernigerode.

On 21 May 1738, he issued a primogeniture edict which limited the rights of inheritance to male descendants and disallowed future divisions of the County of Wernigerode.

When his brother Heinrich August died in 1748, Christian Ernest inherited the territory of Schwarza, Thuringia.

Christian Ernest was a Knight of the Royal Prussian Order of the Black Eagle and the Royal Danish Ordre de l'Union Parfaite. From 1735 to 1745 he served his cousin on his mother's side, King Christian VI of Denmark, as privy councillor (Geheimrat).

Under the reign of Christian Ernest much building activity was undertaken in the County of Wernigerode. He had the Lustgarten (Pleasure Garden) in Wernigerode refashioned in the French style and installed an Orangery. He was also responsible for building the still preserved Wolkenhäuschen ("Cabin in the Clouds"), a small refuge on the Brocken, the highest mountain in the Harz mountain range.

== Marriage and descendants ==
On 31 March 1712, Christian Ernest married Sophie Charlotte, Countess of Leiningen-Westerburg (22 February 1695 - 10 December 1762). She was the daughter of Johann Anton, Graf zu Leiningen-Westerburg in Schadeck and Christine Luise, Countess zu Sayn-Wittgenstein.

They had one son: Henry Ernest of Stolberg-Wernigerode (1716–1778), married firstly Countess Marie Elizabeth II of Promnitz with issue. He married secondly Princess Christiane Anne of Anhalt-Köthen (1726–1790), daughter of Augustus Louis, Prince of Anhalt-Köthen (1697–1755), and had issue.

== Literature ==
- Ernst Förstemann: Graf Christian Ernst zu Stolberg-Wernigerode, Hannover 1886.
- Friedrich Wilhelm Bautz (1975). "CHRISTIAN ERNST Graf von Stolberg-Wernigerode". In Bautz, Friedrich Wilhelm (ed.). Biographisch-Bibliographisches Kirchenlexikon (BBKL) (in German). Vol. 1. Hamm: Bautz. cols. 1003–1004. ISBN 3-88309-013-1.
