= Emilie of Promnitz-Pless =

Princess of Anhalt-Köthen (1708–1732)

Emilie
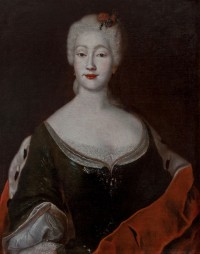
- Portrait, c. 1730

Princess consort of Anhalt-Köthen
- Tenure: 19 November 1728 – 20 February 1732
- Born: 15 September 1708; Żary, Electorate of Saxony
- Died: 20 February 1732 (aged 23); Köthen, Anhalt-Köthen
- Spouse: Augustus Louis, Prince of Anhalt-Köthen
- Issue: Karl George Lebrecht, Prince of Anhalt-Köthen; Frederick Erdmann, Prince of Anhalt-Pless
Names
- Christine Johanna Emilie
- House: Promnitz (by birth); Ascania (by marriage)
- Father: Erdmann II, Count of Promnitz
- Mother: Anna Maria of Saxe-Weissenfels

Christine Johanna Emilie, Princess of Anhalt-Köthen (née Countess Christine Johanna Emilie of Promnitz-Pless; 15 September 1708 – 20 February 1732) was the second wife and consort of Augustus Louis, Prince of Anhalt-Köthen.

== Biography ==
Countess Christine Johanna Emilie of Promnitz-Pless was born on 15 September 1708 in Żary, to Erdmann II, Count of Promnitz and his wife, Princess Anna Maria of Saxe-Weissenfels, the third daughter of Johann Adolf I, Duke of Saxe-Weissenfels and Johanna Magdalena of Saxe-Altenburg.

On 14 January 1726, she married Prince Augustus Louis of Anhalt-Köthen in Żary. She was his second wife. His first wife, Agnes Wilhelmine von Wuthenau, with whom he was in a morganatic marriage, died in 1725. Emilie and Augustus Louis had five children:

- Christiane Anna Agnes (b. Köthen, 5 December 1726 - d. Wernigerode, 2 October 1790), married on 12 July 1742 to Henry Ernest, Count of Stolberg-Wernigerode.
- Frederick Augustus, Hereditary Prince of Anhalt-Köthen (b. Köthen, 1 November 1727 - d. Schloss Warmsdorf, 26 January 1729).
- Johanna Wilhelmine (b. Warmsdorf, 4 November 1728 - d. Carolath, 17 January 1786), married on 17 December 1749 to Frederick, Prince of Carolath-Beuthen.
- Karl George Lebrecht, Prince of Anhalt-Köthen (b. Köthen, 15 August 1730 - d. Semlin, 17 October 1789).
- Frederick Erdmann, Prince of Anhalt-Pless (b. Köthen, 27 October 1731 - d. Pless, 12 December 1797).

On 19 November 1728, her husband succeeded his brother, Leopold, Prince of Anhalt-Köthen, as the Prince of Anhalt-Köthen.

Emilie died on 20 February 1732 in Köthen. Later that year, her husband married her sister, Anna Friederike of Promnitz-Pless.
