= Louis of Anhalt-Köthen =

German prince of the House of Ascania

Louis of Anhalt-Köthen (b. Köthen, 25 September 1778 - d. Köthen, 16 September 1802) was a German prince of the House of Ascania.

He was the third son of Karl George Lebrecht, Prince of Anhalt-Köthen, and his wife Louise Charlotte, daughter of Frederick, Duke of Schleswig-Holstein-Sonderburg-Glücksburg.

== Life ==
Starting in 1798 he was a Major in the King's Regiment in Danish service, where he received his military training. In 1801, he renounced to the Danish service and went into the Prussian service.

The death of his brother Karl William in 1793 made Louis the next in line to inherit Köthen, preceded only by his older brother Augustus Christian Frederick.

His early death prevented his eventual inheritance of Köthen, but his son Louis Augustus succeeded his uncle in Anhalt-Köthen when he died ten years later.

== Marriage and issue ==
In Darmstadt on 20 September 1800 Louis married Louise Karoline Theodora Amalie (b. Darmstadt, 15 January 1779 - d. Köthen, 18 April 1811), daughter of the later (1806) Louis I, Grand Duke of Hesse and by Rhine. They had two sons:

1. Frederick William Augustus (b. Halle an der Saale, 7 July 1801 - d. Köthen, 29 October 1801).
2. Louis Augustus (b. posthumously, Köthen, 20 September 1802 - d. Leipzig, 18 December 1818).
