= Agnes Wilhelmine von Wuthenau =

German noblewoman (1700–1725)

- Countess of Warmsdorf
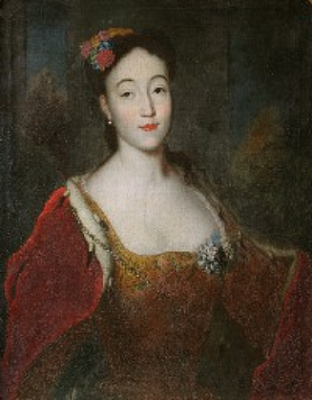
- Born: 4 December 1700; Plötzkau, Anhalt-Bernburg
- Died: 14 January 1725 (aged 24); Köthen, Saxony-Anhalt
- Noble family: Wuthenau (by birth); Anhalt-Köthen (by marriage)
- Spouse: Augustus Louis, Prince of Anhalt-Köthen
- Issue: Princess Gisela Henriette; Princess Agnes Leopoldine
- Father: Christian Ludwig von Wuthenau
- Mother: Agnes Sabine von Schlegel

Agnes Wilhelmine von Wuthenau, Countess of Warmsdorf (4 December 1700 – 14 January 1725) was a German noblewoman and the first wife of Augustus Louis, Prince of Anhalt-Köthen.

== Biography ==
=== Early life and ancestry ===
Agnes Wilhelmine was born on 4 December 1700 in Plötzkau into the Wuthenau family, an old German aristocratic family which belonged to the Saxon uradel, as the eldest daughter of Christian Ludwig von Wuthenau and his wife, Agnes Sabine von Schlegel.

=== Court lady ===
She served as a lady-in-waiting to Gisela Agnes of Anhalt-Köthen, who ruled as regent of Anhalt-Köthen. She became engaged to Gisela Agnes's son, Prince Augustus Louis of Anhalt-Köthen, on 18 November 1721. She was created Countess of Warmsdorf by Charles VI, Holy Roman Emperor.

=== Marriage and issue ===
Agnes and Augustus Louis married on 23 January 1722 in Dresden. As the marriage was initially considered morganatic, she did not obtain the title and style of princess.

They had two daughters, who were all recognized as princesses of Anhalt:

- Gisela Henriette (b. Warmsdorf, 16 December 1722 - d. Warmsdorf, 16 December 1728), died young.
- Agnes Leopoldine (b. Köthen, 31 May 1724 - d. Köthen, 28 July 1766), died unmarried.

=== Death ===
Agnes died on 14 January 1725, three years before her husband succeeded his brother as the ruling Prince of Anhalt-Köthen. After her death, August Ludwig married Countess Christine Johanna Emilie von Promnitz and later his own sister-in-law, Countess Anna Friederike von Promnitz and had issue from all his marriages.
