= Henry, Duke of Anhalt-Köthen =

German prince

Henry
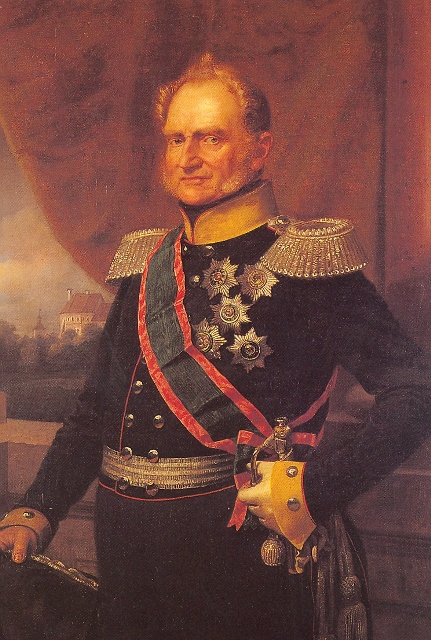
- Portrait of Henry by Franz Krüger

Duke of Anhalt-Köthen
- Reign: 1830–1847
- Predecessor: Frederick Ferdinand
- Successor: Leopold IV, Duke of Anhalt
- Born: 30 July 1778; Pless
- Died: 23 November 1847 (aged 69); Köthen
- Spouse: Princess Auguste Friederike Reuss of Köstritz (m. 1819)
- House: House of Ascania
- Father: Frederick Erdmann, Prince of Anhalt-Pless
- Mother: Louise Ferdinande

Henry of Anhalt-Köthen (30 July 1778 – 23 November 1847) was a German prince of the House of Ascania, ruler of the non-sovereign principality of Anhalt-Pless and the last ruler of the duchy of Anhalt-Köthen.

== Life ==
He was the fourth (but third surviving) son of Frederick Erdmann, Prince of Anhalt-Pless, by his wife, Louise Ferdinande, daughter of Henry Ernest, Count of Stolberg-Wernigerode.

In 1796, he joined the Prussian army. During the campaign of 1806, he attained the rank of major. Before he retired from active service, Henry was elevated to the rank of Generalmajor.

After his elder brother Frederick Ferdinand inherited Anhalt-Köthen in 1818, Henry assumed the government over the state country of Pless. When Frederick Ferdinand died in 1830, Henry succeeded him in Köthen, whereas he left Pless to his younger brother Louis, who died in 1841 without heirs. Henry reassumed his rulership over Pless until his death.

In Trebschen on 18 May 1819, Henry married Auguste Fredericka Espérance (3 August 1794, Brunswick – 13 July 1855, Köthen), daughter of Henry XLIV, Prince Reuss of Köstritz, and sister of Prince Henry LXIII. The union was childless.

Since his youth, Henry was a strong advocate of homeopathy. In 1821, he took under his protection its creator, Samuel Hahnemann, who remained with his large family in Köthen for the next fourteen years as Henry's physician.

In 1830, Henry was made a knight of the Order of the Black Eagle. In 1841, he resumed service in the Prussian army, and by the time of his death, he was a General of Infantry.

With him, the line of Anhalt-Köthen became extinct. On his death, the duchy was inherited by his kinsmen Alexander Karl of Anhalt-Bernburg and Leopold IV of Anhalt-Dessau. However, Alexander renounced his rights over Köthen on behalf of Leopold IV since it was clear that his eventual assumption of all the Anhalt lands was inevitable.

The principality of Pless, governed by Semi-Salic Law, passed to Henry's nephew Hans Henry X, Count of Hochberg-Fürstenstein (corresponding article in German), son of his sister Anna Emilie, who was the only one of his siblings who had children.

Henry of Anhalt-Köthen House of Ascania Born: 30 July 1778 in Pless Died: 23 November 1847 in Köthen
Preceded by Frederick Ferdinand	Prince of Anhalt-Pless as mediatised non sovereign incumbent 1818–1830	Succeeded by Louis
Preceded by Louis	Prince of Anhalt-Pless as mediatised non sovereign incumbent 1841–1847	Succeeded by Hans Henry X
Regnal titles
Preceded by Frederick Ferdinand	Duke of Anhalt-Köthen; 1830–1847	Succeeded by Leopold IV
