= Wolfgang Printz =

German composer, music historian and novelist (1641–1717)

- Born: Wolfgang Caspar/Kaspar Printz; 10 October 1641; Germany
- Died: 13 October 1717 (aged 76)
- Occupations: Composer and Theologian

Wolfgang Caspar Printz (10 October 1641 – 13 October 1717), normally referred to as Wolfgang Printz (with sometimes the variation of Kaspar), was a German composer who studied theology and was appointed cantor at Promnitz, Triebel and Sorau. His Historische Beschreibung der edlen Sing- und Klingkunst...von Anfang der Welt bis auf unserer Zeit (which in English means: Historical description of the noble art of singing and instrumental music ... from the beginning of the world until our time) was the first history of music written in Germany.

== Life ==
Printz was the son of a forester in Oberpfalz. He had hardly any training before he enrolled in 1659 at the university of Altdorf, near Nuremberg, where he learned the fundaments of music theory from Abdias Treu. He broke the Altdorfer study time in 1661 and soon abandoned it to work as a tutor. This employment limited his ability to travel. At the age of 21 in 1662 he moved to Dresden, where he became Kapellmeister at the court of the arts-friendly Silesian magnate Count Erdmann I. He traveled with his new employer, even to Bohemian and Hungarian military camps.

After the count's death in 1664 he accepted a position as cantor at the Sorau church, started a family and spent the next 52 years as a composer and musicologicist. Similar to Johann Kuhnau, he released several popular musical compositions alongside novels. Under Erdmann II of Promnitz he again took over the management of the court orchestra, until succeeded by the young Georg Philipp Telemann in 1704. His musical oeuvre has largely disappeared, but his historical description still offers useful information on contemporary composers.
