= Anna Reuss of Köstritz =

- Born: 9 January 1837; Dresden
- Died: 2 February 1907 (aged 70); Wernigerode
- Noble family: House of Reuss
- Spouse: Otto of Stolberg-Wernigerode
- Father: Henry LXIII, Prince Reuss of Köstritz
- Mother: Countess Caroline of Stolberg-Wernigerode

Princess Anna Elizabeth Reuss of Köstritz (9 January 1837 in Dresden – 2 February 1907 in Wernigerode), was a princess of Reuss by birth and by marriage countess, and after 1890 princess, of Stolberg-Wernigerode.

== Life ==
Anna was the daughter of Prince Henry LXIII, Prince Reuss of Köstritz (1786–1841) and his second wife Countess Caroline of Stolberg-Wernigerode (1806–1899).

Anna spent her childhood at Staniszów Castle in Silesia. She was artistically talented and in 1862 she went to Berlin, where she received painting and music lessons and met Count Otto of Stolberg-Wernigerode, whom she married on 22 August 1863 at Staniszów Castle.

In 1890 her husband was raised to Prince of Stolberg-Wernigerode. His political rise allowed a major expansion of Wernigerode Castle, which lasted from 1862 to 1893. The castle was restructured in a historicistic style; Anna was creatively involved in this endeavour. She and her daughters and daughters-in-law created the eight large tapestries in the Castle Church.

Anna also wrote numerous plays and poems. The best known among these are "Jagd am Hubertustag" and "Holtemme".

== Issue ==
From her marriage to Otto, Anna had 7 children:

- Christian Ernest (1864–1940), Prince of Stolberg-Wernigerode

married in 1891 Countess Marie of Castell-Rüdenhausen (1864–1942)

- Elizabeth (1866–1928)

married in 1885 Count Constantin of Stolberg-Wernigerode (1843–1905)

- Hermann (1867–1913)

married in 1910 princess Dorothea of Solms-Hohensolms-Lich (1883–1942), daughter of Hermann of Solms-Hohensolms-Lich

- William (1870–1932)

married in 1910 Princess Elizabeth of Erbach-Schönberg (1883–1966)

- Henry (1871–1874)
- Marie (1872–1950)

married in 1902 Count William of Solms-Laubach (1861–1936)

- Emma (1875–1956)

married in 1894 Prince Charles of Solms-Hohensolms-Lich (1866–1920)

== Ancestry ==
Ancestors of Anna Reuss of Köstritz

16. Heinrich XXIV, Count Reuss of Köstritz
8. Heinrich IX, Count Reuss of Köstritz
17. Baroness Eleonore von Promnitz-Dittersbach
4. Prince Heinrich XLIV Reuss of Köstritz
18. Count Karl von Wartensleben und Flodroff
9. Countess Amalie von Wartensleben-Flodroff
19. Johanna Margaretha Huyssen van Kattendijke
2. Heinrich LXIII, Prince Reuss of Köstritz
20. Baron Johann von Geuder genannt Rabensteiner
10. Baron Friedrich Christian von Geuder genannt Rabensteiner
22. Baroness Sophia von Lettmath
5. Baroness Wilhelmine von Geuder genannt Rabensteiner
22. Johann von Bredow
11. Johanna von Bredow
23. Sophie von Borcke
1. Princes Anna Reuss of Köstritz
24. Count Heinrich Ernst of Stolberg-Wernigerode
12. Count Christian Frederick of Stolberg-Wernigerode
25. Princess Christiane of Anhalt-Köthen
6. Count Heinrich of Stolberg-Wernigerode
26. Christoph Ludwig, Count of Stolberg-Stolberg
13. Countess Auguste of Stolberg-Stolberg
27. Countess Luise of Stolberg-Rossla
3. Countess Caroline of Stolberg-Wernigerode
28. Count Albrecht of Schönburg-Waldenburg
14. Prince Otto Karl Friedrich of Schonburg-Waldenburg
29. Friederike von der Marwitz
7. Princess Johanna of Schonburg-Waldenburg
30. Count Heinrich XXIII Reuss-Köstritz
15. Countess Henriette Eleonore Elisabeth Reuss-Köstritz
31. Countess Ernestine of Schönburg-Wechselburg
