= Frederick Erdmann, Prince of Anhalt-Pless =

German prince

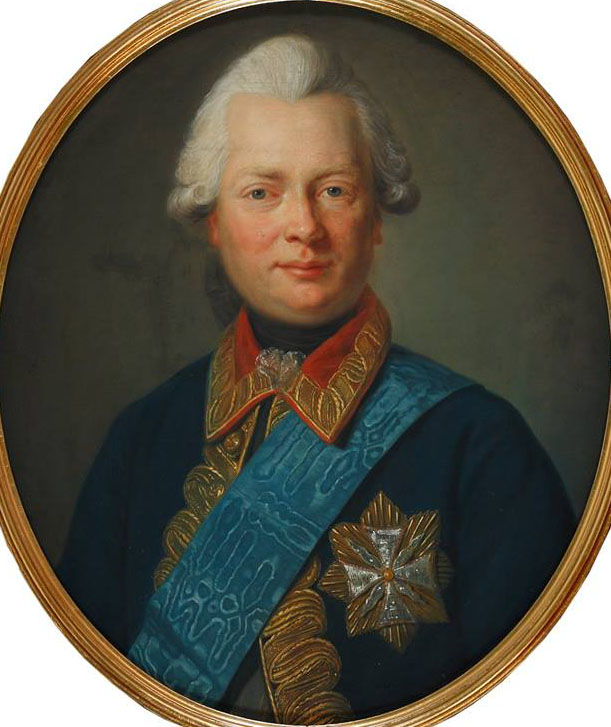
Portrait of Frederick Erdmann by an unknown artist, c. 1770

Frederick Erdmann of Anhalt-Pless (27 October 1731 – 12 December 1797) was a German prince from the Anhalt-Köthen branch of the House of Ascania, and the first ruler of the Principality of Anhalt-Pless. In 1784 he has received Polish-Lithuanian Commonwealth citizenship (Indygenat)

== Life ==
As the youngest surviving son of Augustus Louis, Prince of Anhalt-Köthen, by his second wife, Christine Johanna Emilie, daughter of Count Erdmann II of Promnitz-Pless, Frederick Erdmann's prospects of inheriting or ruling jointly over Köthen were dim at birth. His situation changed in 1765, after the death of his infant cousin Count William of Promnitz, heir apparent of Pless, left his uncle Johann Erdmann, Count of Promnitz-Pless, without any heirs male; the child's uncle then decided to give Frederick Erdmann the county as an anticipated inheritance. The lordships of Jannowitz, Peterswaldau and Kreppelhof, however, Johann Erdmann gave to his great-nephew Christian Frederick of Stolberg-Wernigerode (nephew and, later, brother-in-law of Frederick Erdmann).

After receiving this inheritance, Frederick Erdmann moved to Pless and assumed the title "Prince of Anhalt-Pless" (sometimes "of Anhalt-Köthen-Pless").

== Marriage and issue ==
In Wernigerode on 13 June 1766, Frederick Erdmann was married to his niece, Countess Louise Ferdinande zu Stolberg-Wernigerode (Wernigerode, 30 September 1744 – Pless, 3 February 1784), daughter of Count Heinrich Ernst zu Stolberg-Wernigerode and his wife, Princess Christiane Anna Agnes of Anhalt-Köthen, Frederick Erdmann's older sister. They had nine children:

1. Emmanuel Ernest Erdmann, Hereditary Prince of Anhalt-Pless (Schloss Pless, 9 January 1768 – Schloss Pless, 4 June 1808). Due to having a mental disability, he was excluded from the succession.
2. Frederick Ferdinand, Prince of Anhalt-Pless and from 1818 Duke of Anhalt-Köthen (Pless, 25 June 1769 – Köthen, 23 August 1830).
3. Anna Emilie (Pless, 20 May 1770 – Fürstenstein, 1 February 1830), married on 21 May 1791 Hans Henry VI, Imperial Count of Hochberg and Freiherr of Fürstenstein (near Waldenburg in Lower Silesia). She was the only one of Frederick Erdmann's six surviving children to have children, and her descendants eventually inherited Pless.
4. Benedikte (Büdingen, 14 July 1771 – Büdingen, 4 February 1773).
5. Christiane (Pless, 8 February 1774 – Pless, 1 August 1783).
6. George (Pless, 29 May 1776 – Pless, 29 July 1777).
7. Henry, Duke of Anhalt-Köthen (Schloss Pless, 30 July 1778 – Köthen, 23 November 1847).
8. Christian Frederick (Schloss Pless, 14 November 1780 – Kulm (killed in action), 30 August 1813).
9. Louis (Pless, 16 July 1783 – Pless, 5 November 1841).

Preceded by new creation	Prince of Anhalt-Pless; 1765–1797	Succeeded by Frederick Ferdinand
