= Karl George Lebrecht, Prince of Anhalt-Köthen =

German prince

Karl George Lebrecht
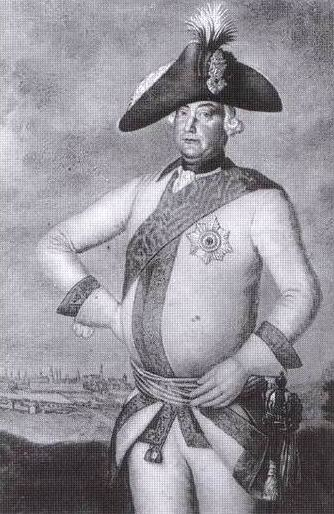

Prince of Anhalt-Köthen
- Reign: 1755 – 1789
- Born: 15 August 1730; Köthen, Anhalt-Köthen; Holy Roman Empire
- Died: 17 October 1789 (aged 59); Semlin
- Spouse: Louise Charlotte of Schleswig-Holstein-Sonderburg-Glücksburg
- Issue: Augustus Christian Frederick, Duke of Anhalt-Köthen; Prince Louis of Anhalt-Köthen
- House: Ascania
- Father: Augustus Louis, Prince of Anhalt-Köthen
- Mother: Christine Johanna Emilie of Promnitz-Pless

Karl George Lebrecht of Anhalt-Köthen (Köthen, 15 August 1730 – Semlin, 17 October 1789), was a German prince of the House of Ascania and ruler of the principality of Anhalt-Köthen.

He was the second (but eldest surviving) son of Augustus Louis, Prince of Anhalt-Köthen, by his second wife Christine Johanna Emilie, daughter of Erdmann II, Count of Promnitz-Pless.

== Life ==
As a young prince, Karl George Lebrecht served briefly in the Danish army (1750–51) and, from November 1751, in the Prussian army.

In 1755, he inherited Anhalt-Köthen after the death of his father.

Karl George Lebrecht was created a knight of the Order of the Black Eagle in 1780 and in 1787 was elevated to the rank of Generalfeldmarschall.

During the Turkish Wars of the 1780s he contracted a fever and died in Semlin (now Zemun) near Belgrade.

== Marriage and issue ==
In Glücksburg on 26 July 1763 Karl George Lebrecht married Louise Charlotte (b. Glücksburg, 5 March 1749 - d. Köthen, 30 March 1812), daughter of Frederick (1701–1766), Duke of Schleswig-Holstein-Sonderburg-Glücksburg, and by birth a princess of Denmark as descendant in the male line of King Christian III. They had six children:

1. Karoline Louise (b. Köthen, 8 January 1767 - d. Köthen, 8 February 1768).
2. Augustus Christian Frederick, Prince and from 1806 first Duke of Anhalt-Köthen (b. Köthen, 18 November 1769 - d. Schloss Geuz, 5 May 1812).
3. Karl William (b. Köthen, 5 January 1771 - killed in action at Avesnes, 8 November 1793).
4. Louise Friederike (b. Köthen, 30 August 1772 - d. Köthen, 28 December 1775).
5. Louis (b. Köthen, 25 September 1778 - d. Köthen, 16 September 1802).
6. Fredericka Wilhelmine (b. Köthen, 7 September 1780 - d. Köthen, 21 July 1781).

Preceded by Augustus Louis	Prince of Anhalt-Köthen; 1755–1789	Succeeded by Augustus Christian Frederick
