= Heinrich LXIII, Prince Reuss of Köstritz =

Prince of Reuss (1786–1841)

Prince Heinrich LXIII Reuss of Köstritz
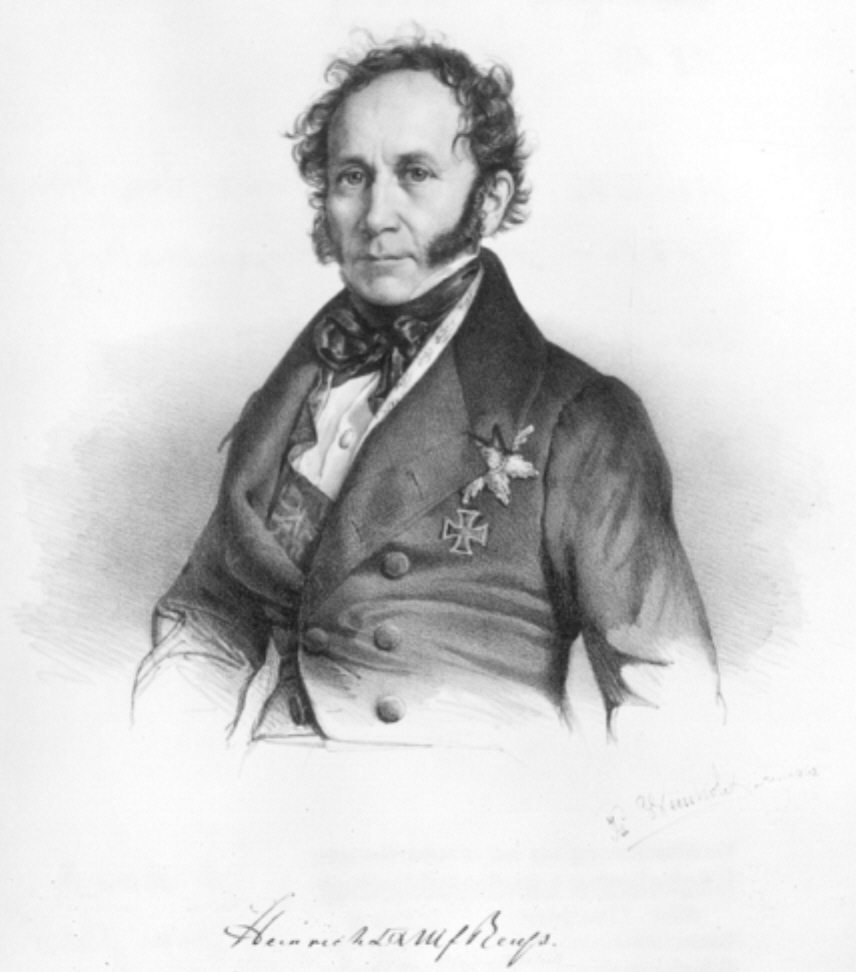
- Born: 18 June 1786; Berlin, Kingdom of Prussia
- Died: 27 September 1841 (aged 52); Stonsdorf, Kingdom of Prussia
- Spouse: Countess Eleonore of Stolberg-Wernigerode; Countess Caroline of Stolberg-Wernigerode
- Issue: Augusta, Grand Duchess of Mecklenburg-Schwerin; Heinrich VII, Prince Reuss of Köstritz; Anna, Princess of Stolberg-Wernigerode
- House: House of Reuss
- Father: Prince Heinrich XLIV Reuss of Köstritz
- Mother: Baroness Wilhelmine Friederike Marie Auguste Eleonore of Geuder-Rabensteiner

Prince Heinrich LXIII Reuss of Köstritz (18 June 1786 – 27 September 1841) was a member of the House of Reuss.

== Life ==
After the death of his elder brother Heinrich LX in 1833, he was the senior member of the Köstritz branch of the House of Reuss. His sister, Princess Auguste Friederike Espérance, was the wife of Henry, Duke of Anhalt-Köthen.

He was married twice. On 21 February 1819 at Wernigerode Castle, he married on Countess Eleonore of Stolberg-Wernigerode (1801–1827), who was a daughter of Count Henry of Stolberg-Wernigerode. After she died, on 11 May 1828, Heinrich LXIII married her sister Countess Caroline of Stolberg-Wernigerode (1806–1899).

From 1833 until his death, he was a member of the First Chamber of the Saxon parliament. As the owner of a Manor, he had been appointed by the king. Among others, he owned estates in Klipphausen, Spreewiese and Klix.

== Offspring ==
Heinrich LXIII had the following children:

From his first marriage:

- Joanna, usually called Jenny (1820–1878), married in 1843 to Prince Ferdinand of Schoenaich-Carolath
- Heinrich IV, Prince Reuss of Köstritz (1821–1894), inherited in 1878 the title of Prince from his cousin Prince Heinrich LXIX Reuss of Köstritz, father of Heinrich XXIV, Prince Reuss of Köstritz and Eleonore, Tsaritsa of Bulgaria
- Augusta (1822–1862), married the Grand Duke Frederick Francis II of Mecklenburg-Schwerin
- Heinrich VI Prince Reuss (1823–1823), died just days after his birth in Wernigerode
- Heinrich VII (1825–1906), Adjutant General of Emperor William I, the first German ambassador to Constantinople, lived most of his life in Trebschen (modern Trzebiechów, Poland)
- Heinrich X, Prince Reuss (1827–1847), his birth mother Eleonore died when he was born

From his second marriage:

- Heinrich XII, Prince Reuss (1829–1866), Lord of Stonsdorf; married in 1858 Anna Countess of Hochberg-Fürstenstein; his grandson would marry Sophie Renate Reuss of Köstritz
- Heinrich XIII, Prince Reuss (1830–1897), Lord of Baschkow; married in 1869 Anna Countess of Hochberg-Fürstenstein
- Louise (1832–1862)
- Heinrich XV, Prince Reuss (1834–1869), married in 1863 Countess Luitgarde of Stolberg-Wernigerode
- Anna (1837–1907), married in 1863 Prince Otto of Stolberg-Wernigerode
- Heinrich XVII, Prince Reuss (1839–1870), killed in the Battle of Mars-la-Tour

== Ancestry ==
Ancestors of Heinrich LXIII, Prince Reuss of Köstritz

8. Heinrich XXIV, Count Reuss of Köstritz
4. Heinrich IX, Count Reuss of Köstritz
9. Baroness Eleonore von Promnitz-Dittersbach
2. Heinrich XLIV, Prince Reuss of Köstritz
10. Count Karl von Wartensleben und Flodroff
5. Countess Amalie von Wartensleben und Flodroff
11. Johanna Margaretha Huyssen van Kattendijke, Countess of Flodroff
1. Heinrich LXIII, Prince Reuss of Köstritz
12. Baron Johann von Geuder genannt Rabensteiner
6. Baron Friedrich Christian von Geuder genannt Rabensteiner
13. Baroness Sophia von Lettmath
3. Baroness Wilhelmine von Geuder genannt Rabensteiner
14. Johann von Bredow
7. Johanna von Bredow
15. Sophie von Borcke
