= Louis Augustus, Duke of Anhalt-Köthen =

Louis Augustus
- Duke of Anhalt-Köthen
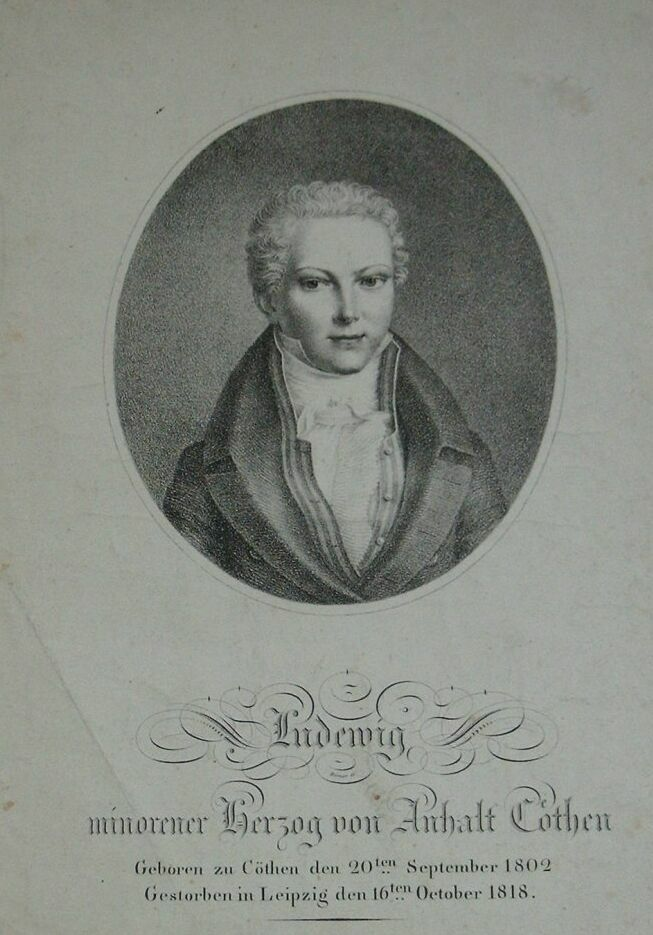
- Lithograph of Louis Augustus, 1818

Duke of Anhalt-Köthen
- Reign: 5 May 1812 – 18 December 1818
- Predecessor: Augustus Christian Frederick
- Successor: Frederick Ferdinand
- Regent: Leopold III, Duke of Anhalt-Dessau (1812–1817); Leopold IV, Duke of Anhalt-Dessau (1817–1818)
- Born: 20 September 1802; Köthen, Anhalt, Holy Roman Empire
- Died: 18 December 1818 (aged 16); Leipzig, Kingdom of Saxony, German Confederation
- Burial: St. Jakob, Köthen
Names
- German: Ludwig August Karl Friedrich Emil
- House: Ascania
- Father: Prince Louis of Anhalt-Köthen
- Mother: Princess Louise of Hesse-Darmstadt

Louis Augustus Karl Frederick Emil, Duke of Anhalt-Köthen (Köthen, 20 September 1802 – Leipzig, 18 December 1818), was a German prince of the House of Ascania and ruler of the duchy of Anhalt-Köthen.

He was the second (but only surviving son) of Prince Louis of Anhalt-Köthen by his wife Princess Luise Karoline Theodora Amalie of Hesse-Darmstadt, daughter of the later (1806) Louis I, Grand Duke of Hesse and by Rhine.

== Life ==
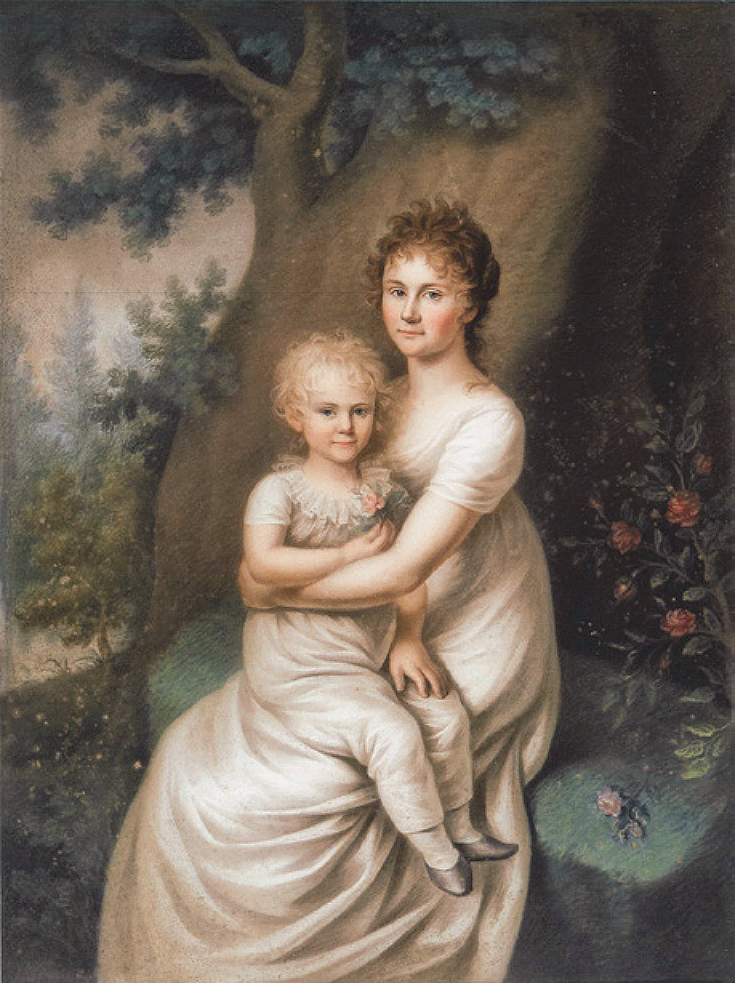
Princess Louise of Hesse-Darmstadt with her son Prince Louis Augustus of Anhalt-Köthen (1805).

Prince Louis Augustus was born posthumously, four days after the death of his father, on 16 September 1802. One year later, his uncle, the reigning Prince (and later Duke) Augustus Christian Frederick of Anhalt-Köthen divorced his wife after eleven years of childless union, and showed no interest in marrying again; this left Louis Augustus as his uncle's heir presumptive.

When Augustus Christian Frederick died in 1812, Louis Augustus succeeded him at the age of ten. Duke Leopold III of Anhalt-Dessau, as head of the whole House of Anhalt, assumed the regency on his behalf until his death in 1817, when his grandson and heir, Leopold IV, assumed guardianship of the duke.

Louis Augustus died at only sixteen years of age. Because he was still a minor, he never ruled on his own. With him, the main line of Anhalt-Köthen became extinct, and he was succeeded by his uncle Frederick Ferdinand, a member of the Anhalt-Köthen-Pless branch.

Preceded by Augustus Christian Frederick	Duke of Anhalt-Köthen; 1812–1818	Succeeded by Frederick Ferdinand
