= Frederick Ferdinand, Duke of Anhalt-Köthen =

German prince and Major General

Frederick Ferdinand
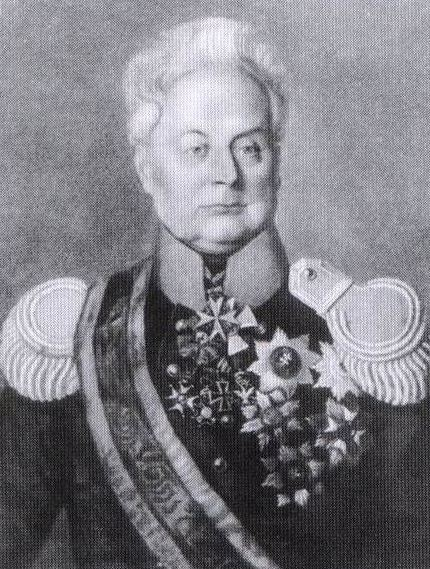

Duke of Anhalt-Köthen
- Reign: 1818–1830
- Predecessor: Louis Augustus
- Successor: Henry
- Born: 25 June 1769; Pless
- Died: 23 August 1830 (aged 61); Köthen
- Spouse: Princess Luise of Schleswig-Holstein-Sonderburg-Beck (m. 1803; died 1803) Countess Julie of Brandenburg (m. 1816)
- House: House of Ascania
- Father: Frederick Erdmann, Prince of Anhalt-Pless
- Mother: Countess Louise Ferdinande of Stolberg-Wernigerode

Frederick Ferdinand of Anhalt-Köthen (25 June 1769, in Pless – 23 August 1830, in Köthen) was a German prince, Ascanian ruler of the principality of Anhalt-Pless and, from 1818, of the duchy of Anhalt-Köthen. He was the second son of Frederick Erdmann, Prince of Anhalt-Pless, and his wife, Countess Louise Ferdinande of Stolberg-Wernigerode, daughter of Henry Ernest, Count of Stolberg-Wernigerode.

== Career ==
In 1786 he joined the Prussian Army, where he obtained the rank of Major General. From 1792 to 1794, he fought in military campaigns on the Rhine.

After the death of his father and his mentally disabled older brother's renunciation of succession rights (1797), Frederick Ferdinand inherited the non-sovereign Prussian state country of Pless, but in 1803 he returned to the Prussian army.

After the Battle of Jena, he commanded his own regiment at Zehdenick near the enemy lines, but was forced to withdraw to Bohemia in order to ensure the disarmament of the Austrians. Soon afterwards he retired from the military and made a trip to the Netherlands and France before his return to Pless. During the War of the Sixth Coalition in 1813, he was Commander of the Silesian countryside.

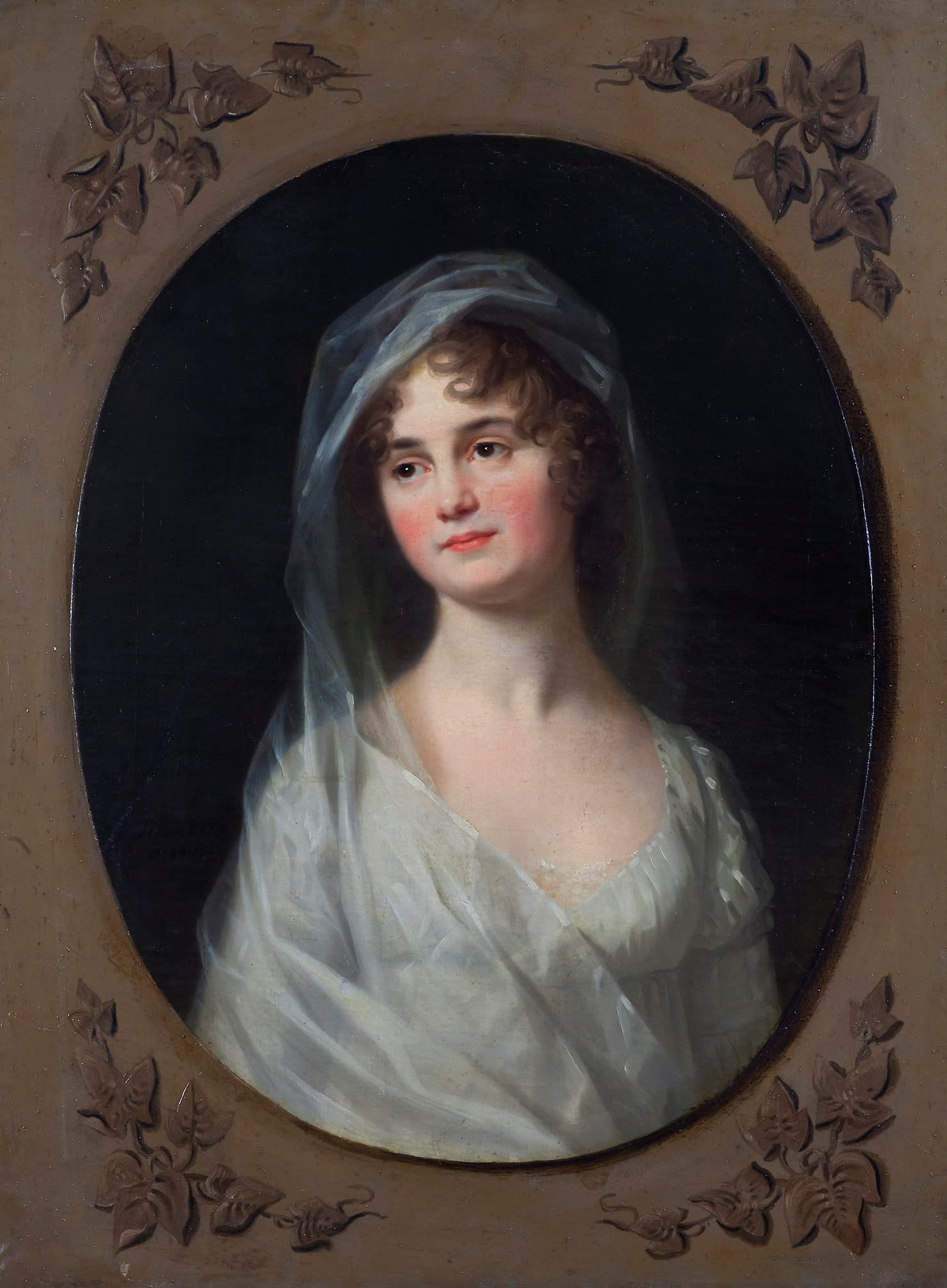
His first wife, Luise of Schleswig-Holstein-Sonderburg-Beck

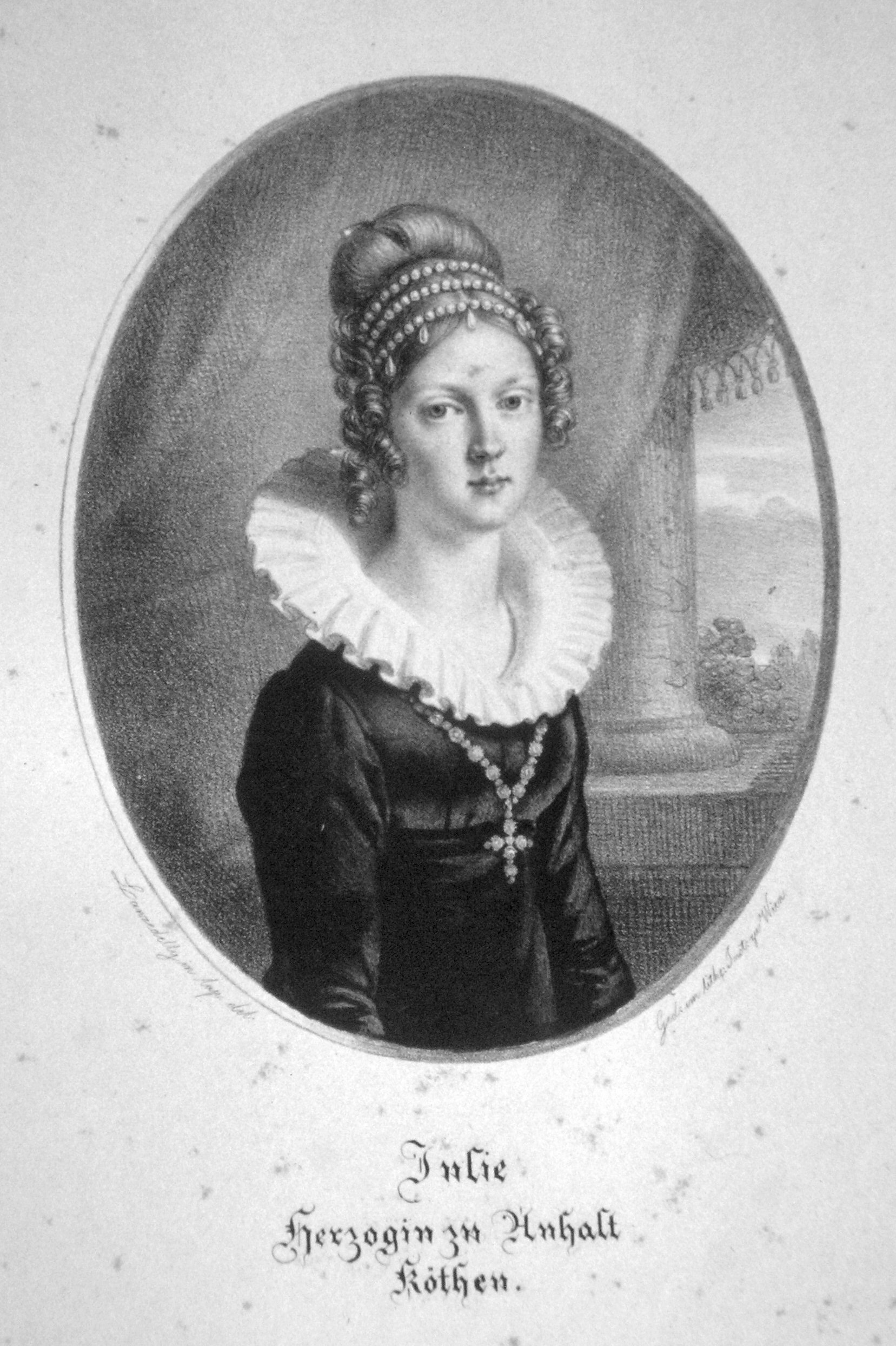
His second wife, Julie of Brandenburg

When the young Duke Louis Augustus died without direct heirs in 1818, Frederick Ferdinand, as his closest male relative, succeeded him in the sovereign duchy. Shortly after, he ceded Pless to his brother Henry.

In Grimschleben, near Nienburg, he brought in the classicist architect Gottfried Bandhauer to remodel his palace. By 1828 he founded a colony in southern Ukraine called "Askania-Nova" (New Ascania), located in the steppes of Tauri, in the northern peninsula of Crimea.

Under his government, Bandhauer also built (between 1823 and 1828) the Ferdinandsbau in Schloss Köthen, the monastery and hospital of the Brothers of Mercy (German: Barmherzigen Brüder) in 1829, and the Catholic Church of St. Mary (Kirche St. Maria) in 1830, in the crypt of which Frederick Ferdinand was buried shortly thereafter.

== Personal life ==
In Lindenau bei Heiligenbeil on 20 August 1803 Frederick Ferdinand married Princess Maria Dorothea Henriette Louise of Schleswig-Holstein-Sonderburg-Beck (28 September 1783, Lindenau – 24 November 1803, Pless), daughter of Friedrich Karl Ludwig, Duke of Schleswig-Holstein-Sonderburg-Beck, and by birth a princess of Denmark as a descendant in the male line of King Christian III. The union lasted only three months until Louise's death.

In Berlin on 20 May 1816 Frederick Ferdinand was married for a second time to Countess Julie of Brandenburg (4 January 1793, Neuchâtel – 29 January 1848, Vienna), illegitimate daughter of King Frederick William II of Prussia by his second wife Countess Sophie von Dönhoff, who was his left hand morganatic wife. This marriage too was childless.

During a trip to Paris in 1825, Frederick Ferdinand and his wife converted to Catholicism. His attempts to convert Köthen to the Catholic faith encountered stiff resistance. The duke chose as confessor the Belgian Jesuit Peter Jan Beckx.

== Death ==
Frederick Ferdinand died on 23 August 1830, in Köthen, aged 71. His body was buried in the Pfarrkirche St.Maria, Köthen, Saxony-Anhalt. On his death without issue, he was succeeded by his brother Henry, Duke of Anhalt-Köthen.

Frederick Ferdinand of Anhalt-Köthen House of Ascania Born: 25 June 1769 in Pless Died: 23 August 1830 in Köthen
Regnal titles
Preceded by Frederick Erdmann	Prince of Anhalt-Pless as mediatised non sovereign incumbent 1797 – 1818	Succeeded by Henry
Preceded by Louis Augustus	Duke of Anhalt-Köthen; 1818 – 1830	Succeeded by Henry
