= Louise Charlotte of Schleswig-Holstein-Sonderburg-Glücksburg =

Danish and German princess

Louise Charlotte
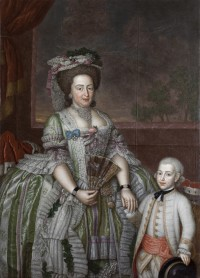
- Portrait of Louise Charlotte and her son Augustus (1780)

Princess Consort of Anhalt-Köthen
- Reign: 26 July 1763 – 17 October 1789
- Born: 5 March 1749; Glücksburg Castle, Schleswig-Holstein
- Died: 30 March 1812 (aged 63); Köthen, Anhalt-Köthen
- Spouse: Karl George Lebrecht, Prince of Anhalt-Köthen
- Issue: Augustus Christian Frederick, Duke of Anhalt-Köthen; Louis of Anhalt-Köthen
- House: Glücksburg (by birth); Ascania (by marriage)
- Father: Frederick, Duke of Schleswig-Holstein-Sonderburg-Glücksburg
- Mother: Henriette Augusta of Lippe-Detmold

Louise Charlotte Friederike, Princess of Anhalt-Köthen (née Princess Louise Charlotte Friederike of Schleswig-Holstein-Sonderburg-Glücksburg; 5 March 1749 – 30 March 1812) was a member of the Danish royal family and the consort of Karl George Lebrecht, Prince of Anhalt-Köthen.

== Biography ==
Princess Louise Charlotte Friederike of Schleswig-Holstein-Sonderburg-Glücksburg was born on 5 March 1749 at Glücksburg Castle. Her father was Frederick, Duke of Schleswig-Holstein-Sonderburg-Glücksburg. Her mother, Henriette Augusta of Lippe-Detmold, was a daughter of Simon Henry Adolph, Count of Lippe-Detmold. Louise Charlotte was a Danish princess by birth, as a male-line descendant of Christian III of Denmark.

On 26 July 1763 she married Karl George Lebrecht, Prince of Anhalt-Köthen, becoming the Princess Consort of Anhalt-Köthen. They had six children:

1. Karoline Louise (b. Köthen, 8 January 1767 - d. Köthen, 8 February 1768).
2. Augustus Christian Frederick, Prince and from 1806 first Duke of Anhalt-Köthen (b. Köthen, 18 November 1769 - d. Schloss Geuz, 5 May 1812).
3. Karl William (b. Köthen, 5 January 1771 - killed in action at Avesnes, 8 November 1793).
4. Louise Friederike (b. Köthen, 30 August 1772 - d. Köthen, 28 December 1775).
5. Louis (b. Köthen, 25 September 1778 - d. Köthen, 16 September 1802).
6. Fredericka Wilhelmine (b. Köthen, 7 September 1780 - d. Köthen, 21 July 1781).

On 29 January 1764 she was a recipient of the Ordre de l'Union Parfaite.

Louise Charlotte died on 30 March 1812 in Köthen.
