= Anna Friederike of Promnitz-Pless =

German princess

Anna Friederike
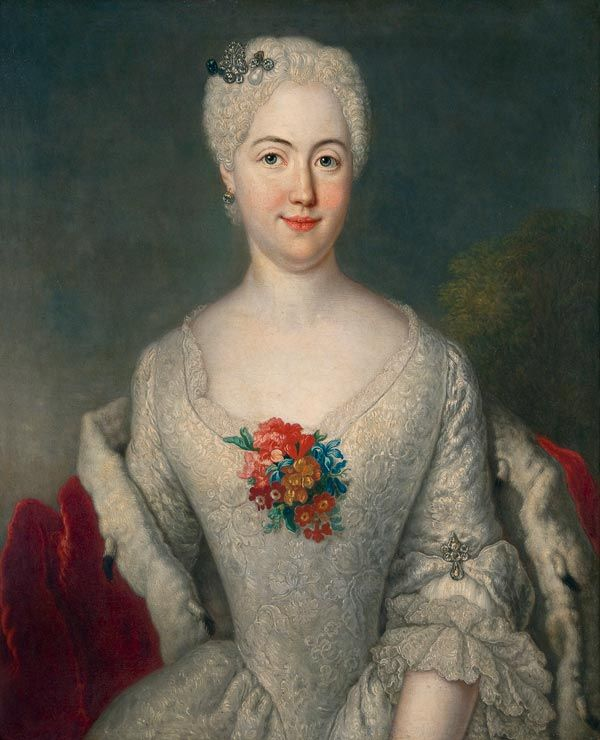
- Portrait c. 1738

Princess consort of Anhalt-Köthen
- Tenure: 21 November 1732 – 31 March 1750
- Born: 30 May 1711; Żary, Electorate of Saxony
- Died: 31 March 1750 (aged 38); Köthen, Anhalt-Köthen
- Spouse: Augustus Louis, Prince of Anhalt-Köthen
- Issue: Princess Charlotte Sophie; Princess Marie Magdalene Benedikte
- House: Promnitz (by birth); Ascania (by marriage)
- Father: Erdmann II, Count of Promnitz
- Mother: Anna Maria of Saxe-Weissenfels

Anna Friederike, Princess of Anhalt-Köthen (née Countess Anna Friederike of Promnitz-Pless; 30 May 1711 – 31 March 1750) was the third wife and consort of Augustus Louis, Prince of Anhalt-Köthen.

== Biography ==
Countess Anna Friederike of Promnitz-Pless was born in Żary on 30 May 1711 to Erdmann II, Count of Promnitz and Princess Anna Maria of Saxe-Weissenfels. Her mother was a daughter of Johann Adolf I, Duke of Saxe-Weissenfels and Johanna Magdalena of Saxe-Altenburg.

On 21 November 1732 she married Augustus Louis, Prince of Anhalt-Köthen in Żary, becoming the princess consort of Anhalt-Köthen. Her husband was previously married to her elder sister, Emilie of Promnitz-Pless, who had died earlier that year. They had two children:

- Princess Charlotte Sophie (25 August 1733 - 6 September 1770)
- Princess Marie Magdalene Benedikte (22 March 1735 - 7 November 1783)

Anna Friederike died on 31 March 1750 in Köthen.
