= Augustus Christian Frederick, Duke of Anhalt-Köthen =

Augustus Christian Frederick
- Duke of Anhalt-Köthen
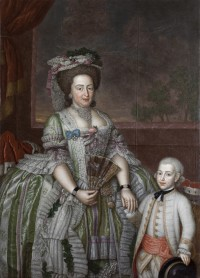
- Portrait of Augustus Christian Frederick and his mother Louise Charlotte (1780)

Prince/Duke of Anhalt-Köthen
- Reign: 17 October 1789 – 5 May 1812
- Predecessor: Karl George Lebrecht
- Successor: Louis Augustus
- Born: 18 November 1769; Köthen, Anhalt-Köthen
- Died: 5 May 1812 (aged 42); Schloss Geuz
- Burial: Köthener Schlosspark
- Spouse: Princess Karoline Friederike of Nassau-Usingen
Names
- German: August Christian Friedrich
- House: Ascania
- Father: Karl George Lebrecht, Prince of Anhalt-Köthen
- Mother: Louise Charlotte of Schleswig-Holstein-Sonderburg-Glücksburg

Augustus Christian Frederick of Anhalt-Köthen (Köthen, 18 November 1769 – Schloss Geuz, 5 May 1812), was a German prince of the House of Ascania, ruler of the principality of Anhalt-Köthen, and from 1806 the first "Duke of Anhalt-Köthen."

He was the eldest son of Karl George Lebrecht, Prince of Anhalt-Köthen, by his wife Louise Charlotte, daughter of Frederick, Duke of Schleswig-Holstein-Sonderburg-Glücksburg.

== Life ==
After the death of his father in 1789, Augustus Christian Frederick inherited the throne of Anhalt-Köthen. Like him, he pursued a military career in the Prussian army, where he became a Generalmajor.

On 15 May 1803, he was appointed Generalfeldmarschallleutnant and on 31 January 1805 made a knight of the Order of the Black Eagle.

In Frankfurt-am-Main on 9 February 1792 Augustus Christian Frederick married Princess Karoline Friederike of Nassau-Usingen (b. Usingen, 30 August 1777 - d. Hochheim, 28 August 1821), daughter of Frederick Augustus, Prince of Nassau-Usingen and later (1806) Duke of Nassau. After eleven years of an unhappy and childless marriage, they were divorced in 1803.

On 18 April 1806, Napoleon granted him the title "Monsieur d'Anhalt" and with this officially elevated him to the Ducal dignity.

At his death six years later without male issue, Augustus Christian Frederick was succeeded by his infant nephew Louis Augustus Karl Frederick Emil, the son of his deceased younger brother Louis.

Preceded by Karl George Lebrecht	Prince of Anhalt-Köthen; 1789–1806	Succeeded by Principality elevated to the rank of Duchy
Preceded by New creation	Duke of Anhalt-Köthen; 1806–1812	Succeeded by Louis Augustus Karl; Frederick Emil
