= Augustus Louis, Prince of Anhalt-Köthen =

18th-century German prince

Augustus Louis
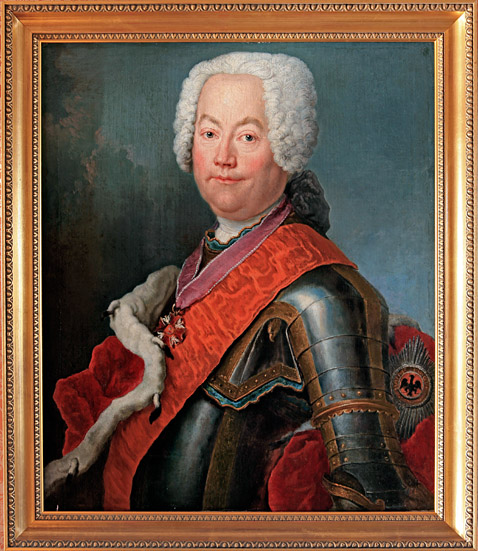
- Portrait, c. 1730

Prince of Anhalt-Köthen
- Reign: 19 November 1728 – 6 August 1755
- Predecessor: Leopold
- Successor: Karl George Lebrecht
- Born: 9 June 1697; Köthen, Anhalt-Köthen; Holy Roman Empire
- Died: 6 August 1755 (aged 58)
- Spouses: Agnes Wilhelmine von Wuthenau; Emilie of Promnitz-Pless; Anna Friederike of Promnitz-Pless
- Issue: Karl George Lebrecht, Prince of Anhalt-Köthen; Frederick Erdmann, Prince of Anhalt-Pless
- House: Ascania
- Father: Emmanuel Lebrecht, Prince of Anhalt-Köthen
- Mother: Gisela Agnes of Rath

Augustus Louis of Anhalt-Köthen (9 June 1697 in Köthen – 6 August 1755 in Köthen), was a German prince of the House of Ascania and ruler of the principality of Anhalt-Köthen.

He was the third (second surviving) son of Emmanuel Lebrecht, Prince of Anhalt-Köthen, and his wife Gisela Agnes of Rath.

== Life ==
In 1702, Augustus' father instituted primogeniture in his lands so that on his death in 1704 only the eldest surviving son, Leopold, inherited his father's titles and powers.

When Leopold was declared of age in 1715, Augustus Louis tried to claim his rights under the old system, but finally Leopold forced him to renounce them. In exchange, Augustus Louis received the enclave of Güsten with its old Schloss built in 1547 by Prince George III and the town of Warmsdorf with all its revenues, as well as other concessions.

After the death from smallpox of Leopold and his two sons in 1728, Augustus Louis inherited Anhalt-Köthen, however he soon faced disputes with his sister-in-law, the Dowager Princess Charlotte Fredericka (who sought the payment of her widow dowry), and his niece Gisela Agnes (who made claims to her father's inheritance).

In 1730 Charlotte Fredericka married Albert Wolfgang, Count of Schaumburg-Lippe, but until her death in 1785 she received the sum of 200,000 Thalers annually from Anhalt-Köthen. For Gisela Agnes, the income from her inheritance rose to 335,000 Thalers a year. These payments left Anhalt-Köthen deeply in debt. Augustus Louis tried to address the fiscal problems created by obligations to his brother's family members, but without success.

== Marriages and Issue ==
About 1720, Augustus Louis fell in love with Agnes Wilhelmine von Wuthenau (b. Plötzkau, 4 December 1700 - d. Köthen, 14 January 1725), of the old nobility of Anhalt and lady-in-waiting to his mother, the Dowager Princess Gisela Agnes. They were engaged on 18 November 1721 and she was created Countess of Warmsdorf (German: Gräfin von Warmsdorf) by the Emperor. The couple finally married in Dresden on 23 January 1722; this morganatic union produced only two daughters, who were recognized as princesses of Anhalt with all appertaining rights:

1. Gisela Henriette (b. Warmsdorf, 16 December 1722 - d. Warmsdorf, 16 December 1728).
2. Agnes Leopoldine (b. Köthen, 31 May 1724 - d. Köthen, 28 July 1766).

In Sorau on 14 January 1726, a year after the death of his first wife, Augustus Louis married again to Christine Johanna Emilie (b. Sorau, 15 September 1708 - d. Köthen, 20 February 1732), daughter of Erdmann II, Count of Promnitz-Pless. They had five children:

1. Christiane Anna Agnes (b. Köthen, 5 December 1726 - d. Wernigerode, 2 October 1790), married on 12 July 1742 to Henry Ernest, Count of Stolberg-Wernigerode.
2. Frederick Augustus, Hereditary Prince of Anhalt-Köthen (b. Köthen, 1 November 1727 - d. Schloss Warmsdorf, 26 January 1729).
3. Johanna Wilhelmine (b. Warmsdorf, 4 November 1728 - d. Carolath, 17 January 1786), married on 17 December 1749 to Frederick, Prince of Carolath-Beuthen.
4. Karl George Lebrecht, Prince of Anhalt-Köthen (b. Köthen, 15 August 1730 - d. Semlin, 17 October 1789).
5. Frederick Erdmann, Prince of Anhalt(-Köthen)-Pless (b. Köthen, 27 October 1731 - d. Pless, 12 December 1797).

In Sorau on 21 November 1732 Augustus Louis married Anna Friederike (b. Sorau, 30 May 1711 - d. Köthen, 31 March 1750), also a daughter of Erdmann II, and the younger sister of his second wife, just nine months after the latter's death. They had two daughters:

1. Charlotte Sophie (b. Köthen, 25 August 1733 - d. Köthen, 6 September 1770).
2. Marie Magdalene Benedikte (b. Köthen, 22 March 1735 - d. Massenheim, 7 November 1783).

Augustus Louis, Prince of Anhalt-Köthen House of Ascania Born: 9 June 1697 Died: 6 August 1755
| Preceded by Leopold | Prince of Anhalt-Köthen; 1728–1755 | Succeeded by Karl George Lebrecht |
