= Erdmann II of Promnitz =

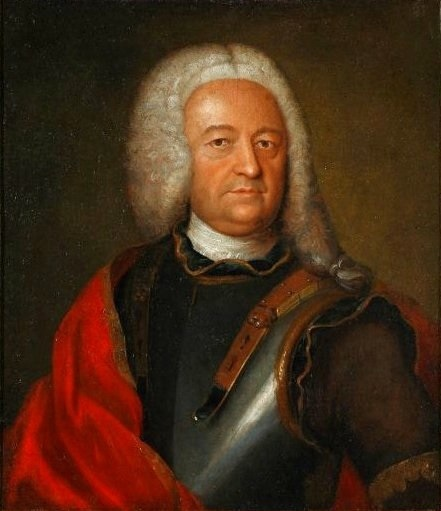
- Born: 22 August 1683; Sorau, Electorate of Saxony (now Żary, Poland)
- Died: 7 September 1745 (aged 62) near Sorau, Electorate of Saxony (now Żary, Poland)
- Noble family: Promnitz
- Spouses: Anna Maria of Saxe-Weissenfels; Henriette Eleonore Reuss-Lobenstein
- Father: Balthasar Erdmann of Promnitz
- Mother: Emilie Agnes Reuss of Schleiz

Erdmann II, Count von Promnitz (born 22 August 1683 in Sorau, Electorate of Saxony (now Żary, Poland); died: 7 September 1745 at the forest castle near Żary) was Lord of Żary (German: Sorau) and Trzebiel (German: Triebel) in Lower Lusatia, and Pszczyna (German: Pless) in Upper Silesia.

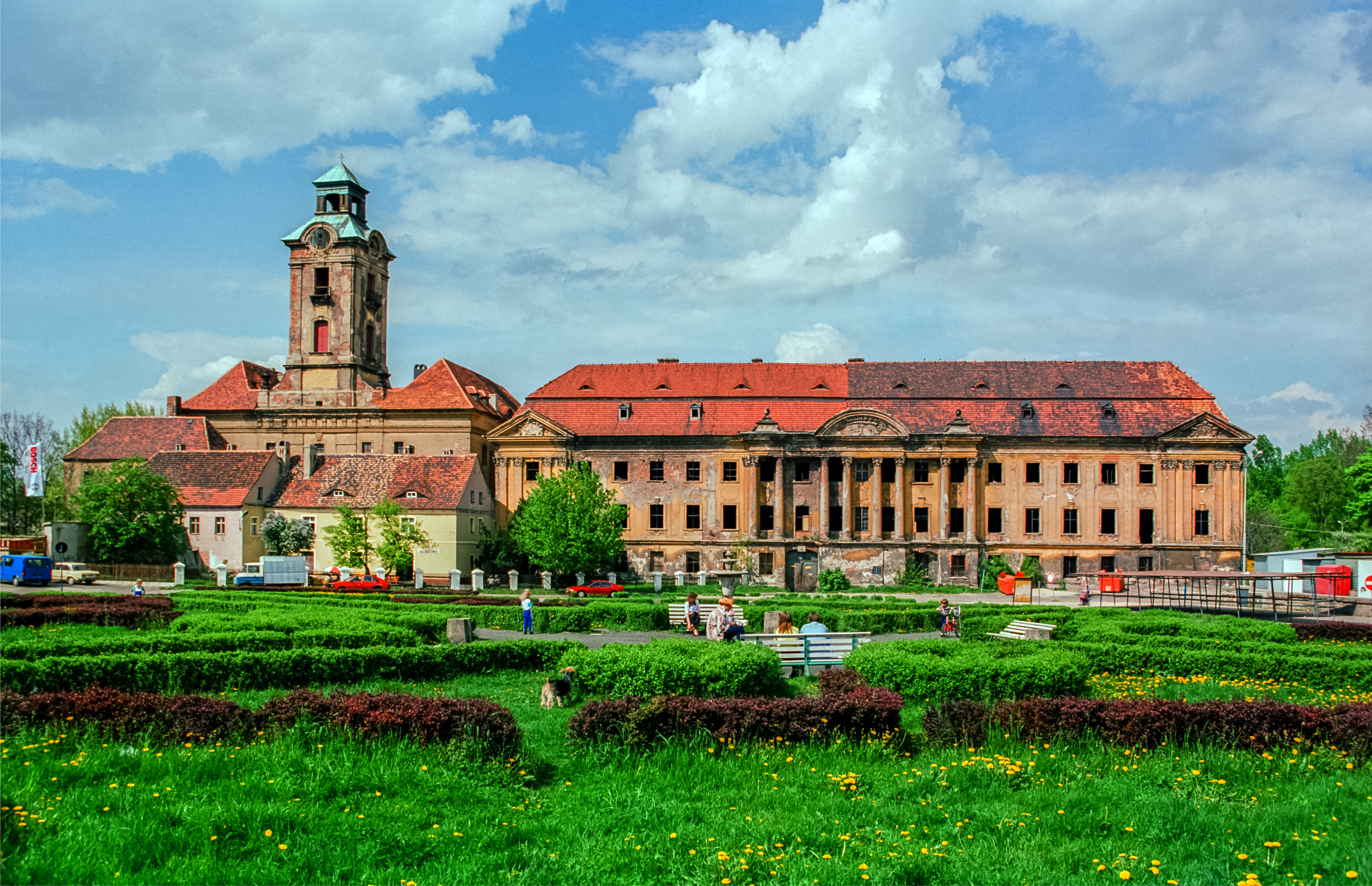
Promnitz Palace in Żary (formerly Sorau)

He served Augustus II the Strong, elector of Saxony and king of Poland, and later his son and successor Augustus III as Privy Councillor and as cabinet minister.

In 1703, Erdmann II inherited his father's vast estates. He administered this estate himself.

Erdmann von Promnitz brought Wolfgang Caspar Printz and Georg Philipp Telemann as Kapellmeister to his court in Sorau.

== Family ==
In 1705, he married Anna Maria, the daughter of the Duke Johann Adolf I, Duke of Saxe-Weissenfels. They had the following children:

- Christine Johanna Emilie (15 September 1708 – 20 February 1732), married in 1726 Prince Augustus Louis, Prince of Anhalt-Köthen (9 June 1697 – 6 August 1755)
- Anna Friederike (May 30, 1711 – March 31, 1750), married in 1732 Augustus Louis of Anhalt-Köthen, who had been the husband of her late elder sister;
- Johanna Sophia (born and died 1713)
- Balthasar Erdmann (born and died 1715)
- Marie Elizabeth (24 October 1717 – 20 July 1741), married Henry Ernest of Stolberg-Wernigerode (1716–78)
- John Erdmann (2 February 1719 – 4 July 1785) married Caroline of Schönaich-Carolath (20 June 1727 – 18 December 1762)
- Agnes Sophie (14 May 1720 – 2 August 1791), married Heinrich XXVIII, Count of Reuss-Ebersdorf (30 August 1726 – 10 May 1797) son of Heinrich XXIX, Count of Reuss-Ebersdorf

He later married his second wife, Henriette Eleonore (1 January 1706 – 7 April 1762), daughter of Heinrich XV, Count of Reuss-Lobenstein (1674–1739). They had one son:

- Seyfried of Promnitz-Drehna (22 May 1734 – 27 February 1760), married Caroline Wilhelmine Louise (15 July 1733 – 18 February 1766), daughter of Count Charles Frederick Augustus of Lippe-Biesterfeld.
