= Henry Ernest of Stolberg-Wernigerode =

German politician, canon, dean and author

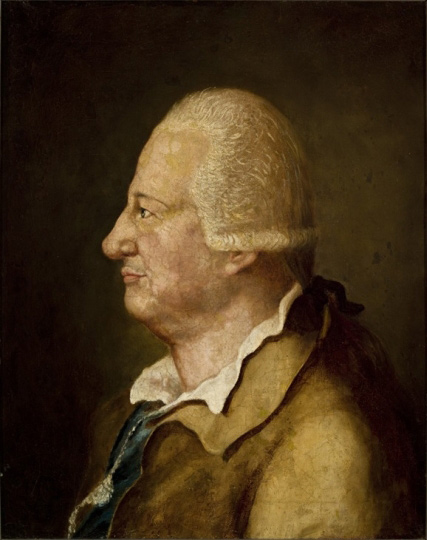
- A 1773 portrait of Henry Ernest
- Born: 7 December 1716; Wernigerode
- Died: 24 October 1778 (aged 61); Halberstadt
- Noble family: House of Stolberg
- Spouses: Countess Marie Elizabeth II of Promnitz; Princess Christiane Anna of Anhalt-Köthen
- Father: Christian Ernest of Stolberg-Wernigerode
- Mother: Countess Sophie Charlotte of Leiningen-Westerburg

Henry Ernest of Stolberg-Wernigerode (German: Heinrich Ernst (later calling himself Henrich Ernst) zu Stolberg-Wernigerode; 7 December 1716, Wernigerode – 24 October 1778, Halberstadt) was a German politician, canon, dean and author of many hymns. He also published some poetry and collections of songs. He was Count of Stolberg-Wernigerode from 1771 until his death.

== Life ==
Henry Ernest was the eldest surviving son of Count Christian Ernest of Stolberg-Wernigerode. His mother, Countess Sophie Charlotte of Leiningen-Westerburg, was heavily influenced by Pietism and raised her son in this spirit. Henry Ernest studied at the universities in Halle and Göttingen and, already in 1739, he received a prebend at the cathedral chapter at Halberstadt; this appointment was confirmed by King Frederick II of Prussia. Also in 1739, he was awarded the Order of the Dannebrog by King Christian VI of Denmark.

His father involved him in the ruling of the county from a young age and after 1742 he consistently attended meetings of the Chamber of Wernigerode. He was involved, for example, in the development of the peat industry on Mount Brocken, in 1743 establishing a peat works on the Brocken named Heinrichshöhe.

During his father's lifetime he enlarged the hymnology department of the count's library, and collected and composed himself almost 400 hymns. He also supported the popular poet Anna Louisa Karsch. In 1763 he had Johann Georg Ziesenis make him a painting showing King Frederick II of Prussia down to the knee.

After his father's death on 25 October 1771, the 55-year-old Henry Ernest took up the government in the county of Wernigerode, where he promoted the most pietistic form of religious life.

== Marriage and issue ==
Henry Ernest was married on 11 December 1738 in Sorau to Marie Elizabeth, daughter of Count Erdmann II of Promnitz. She died on 29 July 1741 in Wernigerode as a result of the birth of their second daughter.

- Charlotte Auguste (9 October 1740 – 20 September 1741)
- Daughter (1741–1741)

After a year of mourning, he was married a second time, in Köthen, to Princess Christiane Anna of Anhalt-Köthen, daughter of Prince Augustus Louis and his second wife, Countess Emilie of Promnitz (making her a niece of his first wife). His son and heir was born from this marriage:

- Christian Frederick (1746–1824)

married Auguste Eleonore of Stolberg-Stolberg (1748–1821)

- Auguste Friederike (4 September 1743 – 9 January 1783)

married firstly on 5 December 1767 to Gustav Frederick of Isenburg-Büdingen (7 August 1715 – 12 February 1768)
married secondly on 24 September 1768 to Louis Casimir of Isenburg-Büdingen (25 August 1710 – 15 December 1775)
married thirdly on 26 June 1777 to Friedrich von Wendt (died 24 September 1818)

- Louise Ferdinand (30 September 1744 – 3 February 1784)

married on 13 June 1766 to Frederick Erdmann, Prince of Anhalt-Pless (1731–1797)

== Works ==
- Religious Poems, edited by Siegmund Jakob Baumgarten, 4 vols, Halle, 1748–52.
- Der sel. u. sichere Glaubensweg eines ev. Christen in gebundene Rede gebracht, Wernigerode 1747
- Neue Sammlung geistlicher Lieder, Wernigerode, 1752 [editor], including his song: Fort, fort, mein Herz, du mußt stets aufwärts steigen

== References and sources ==
- Eduard Jacobs (1893). "Stolberg-Wernigerode, Henrich Ernst Graf zu" . Allgemeine Deutsche Biographie (in German). Vol. 36. Leipzig: Duncker & Humblot. pp. 393–399.
- Friedrich Wilhelm Bautz (1990). "HEINRICH ERNST Graf von Stolberg-Wernigerode". In Bautz, Friedrich Wilhelm (ed.). Biographisch-Bibliographisches Kirchenlexikon (BBKL) (in German). Vol. 2. Hamm: Bautz. cols. 686–687. ISBN 3-88309-032-8.

Henry Ernest of Stolberg-Wernigerode House of Stolberg Born: 7 December 1716 Died: 24 October 1778
Preceded by Christian Ernest	Count of Stolberg-Wernigerode; 1771-1778	Succeeded by Christian Frederick
