= History of Saxony-Anhalt =

The Prussian province of Saxony within Prussia and the German Empire

Anhalt within the German Empire

Flag of Anhalt

Flag of the Prussian province of Saxony

The history of Saxony-Anhalt began with Old Saxony, which was conquered by Charlemagne in 804 and transformed into the Duchy of Saxony within the Carolingian Empire. Saxony went on to become one of the so-called stem duchies of the German Kingdom and subsequently the Holy Roman Empire which formed out of the eastern partition of the Carolingian Empire. The duchy grew to become a powerful state within the empire, ruling over much of what is now northern Germany, but following conflicts with the emperor it was partitioned into numerous minor states, including the Principality of Anhalt, around the end of the 12th century and early 13th century. The territories of the Duchy of Saxony, the Principality of Anhalt, and their successors are now part of the modern German state of Saxony-Anhalt.

The ducal title and electoral dignity passed to the Ascanian Bernhard of Anhalt, but the title only came with a few small eastern parts of the former territory. Following his death in 1212 his possessions were divided between his sons: Henry established Anhalt as a county while Albert I took on the ducal title and the remaining possessions.

Anhalt was raised to a principality in 1218 but was divided in 1252 between Henry's sons, forming Anhalt-Aschersleben, Anhalt-Bernburg and Anhalt-Zerbst. Over the centuries, numerous additional divisions and reunifications of the Anhalt territory took place, resulting in the creation of Anhalt-Köthen, Anhalt-Dessau, Anhalt-Pless and Anhalt-Plötzkau, as well as the recreation of several of the divisions; after 1252 it was only ruled as a single entity between 1570 and 1603.

Meanwhile, after Albert I's death in 1260, the Duchy of Saxony was co-ruled by his sons John I and Albert II, and subsequently also by John I's sons. However, the geographic separation of the territories – Wittenberg, Lauenburg and Hadeln – led to them being increasingly administered separately. In 1296 the duchy was officially separated into two separate duchies: John's sons became rulers of Saxe-Lauenburg (which also included the Hadeln exclave) while Albert II became ruler of Saxe-Wittenberg. In addition to the duchy, Albert had acquired the County of Gommern in 1295, and in 1290 his son and heir Rudolph had been enfeoffed with the lands of the former County of Brehna on Wittenberg's southern border. The status of the electoral dignity was contested by both lines until it was officially settled in Saxe-Wittenberg's favour by the Golden Bull of 1356, after which time it became known as the Electorate of Saxony. In 1423 the Electorate was inherited by the Wettin Frederick I, who was also the Margrave of Meissen and Landgrave of Thuringia. Since Prince-elector was a higher rank than either landgrave or margrave, the whole of Frederick's territory became known as the Electorate of Saxony; the lands around Wittenberg, Brehna and Gommern became known as the Kurkreis or "Electoral Circle".

After the dissolution of the Holy Roman Empire in 1806, the remaining Anhalt divisions – Bernburg, Dessau and Köthen – were elevated to duchies by Napoleon while the Electorate of Saxony became a Kingdom; all were part of Napoleon's Confederation of the Rhine until 1813.

In 1813 the Kingdom of Prussia occupied large amounts of Saxony's territory in the Battle of Leipzig, including the Electoral Circle (which had been renamed the "Wittenberg Circle" in 1807); in May 1815 a treaty was signed in which Saxony ceded this territory to Prussia. In June 1815 they all became part of the German Confederation. In 1816 Prussia reorganised its annexed territory, merging it with the former Duchy of Magdeburg, Principality of Halberstadt, Principality of Erfurt, the Eichsfeld, and the former Imperial Cities of Mühlhausen and Nordhausen, along with the Altmark and other parts of Brandenburg west of the Elbe, into the Province of Saxony.

In 1863 the Anhalt duchies were finally reunited to form the Duchy of Anhalt. The duchy became part of the Prussian-led North German Confederation in 1867 and finally the German Empire in 1871.

Following Germany's defeat in World War I, Anhalt became the Free State of Anhalt while the Province of Saxony continued as a constituent of the Free State of Prussia (both within the Weimar Republic). During Nazi rule, all of the previous subdivisions, including Anhalt and the Province of Saxony, ceased to exist de facto as they were replaced with Gaue in 1934.

After World War II what had been Anhalt and the Province of Saxony formed the basis of the occupying Soviet administration's state (Land) of Saxony-Anhalt. Along with the other states of East Germany, Saxony-Anhalt was dissolved in 1952 and replaced with various districts (Bezirke); Saxony-Anhalt roughly corresponds to the former Magdeburg and Halle districts. However, the states, including Saxony-Anhalt, came back into being following German reunification in 1990, albeit with different borders than the original East German states.

== Duchy of Saxony ==
Saxony (red) within the German Kingdom around the beginning of the 11th century.

After Charlemagne's conquest of the Saxons (772–804), their land was incorporated into the Carolingian empire, and late in the 9th century, it became the first Duchy of Saxony. It occupied nearly all the territory between the Elbe and Saale rivers to the east and the Rhine to the west; it bordered on Franconia and Thuringia in the south. It was itself divided into four provinces: Westphalia, Angria, Eastphalia, and Nordalbingia, with modern Saxony-Anhalt mostly lying within Eastphalia. Duke Henry I (Henry the Fowler) of Saxony was elected German king in 919, and his son, Emperor Otto I, bestowed (961) Saxony on Hermann Billung (d. 973), a Saxon nobleman, whose descendants held the duchy until the extinction of the male line in 1106. Lothair of Supplinburg bestowed it on his Guelphic son-in-law, Henry the Proud, who was already Duke of Bavaria.

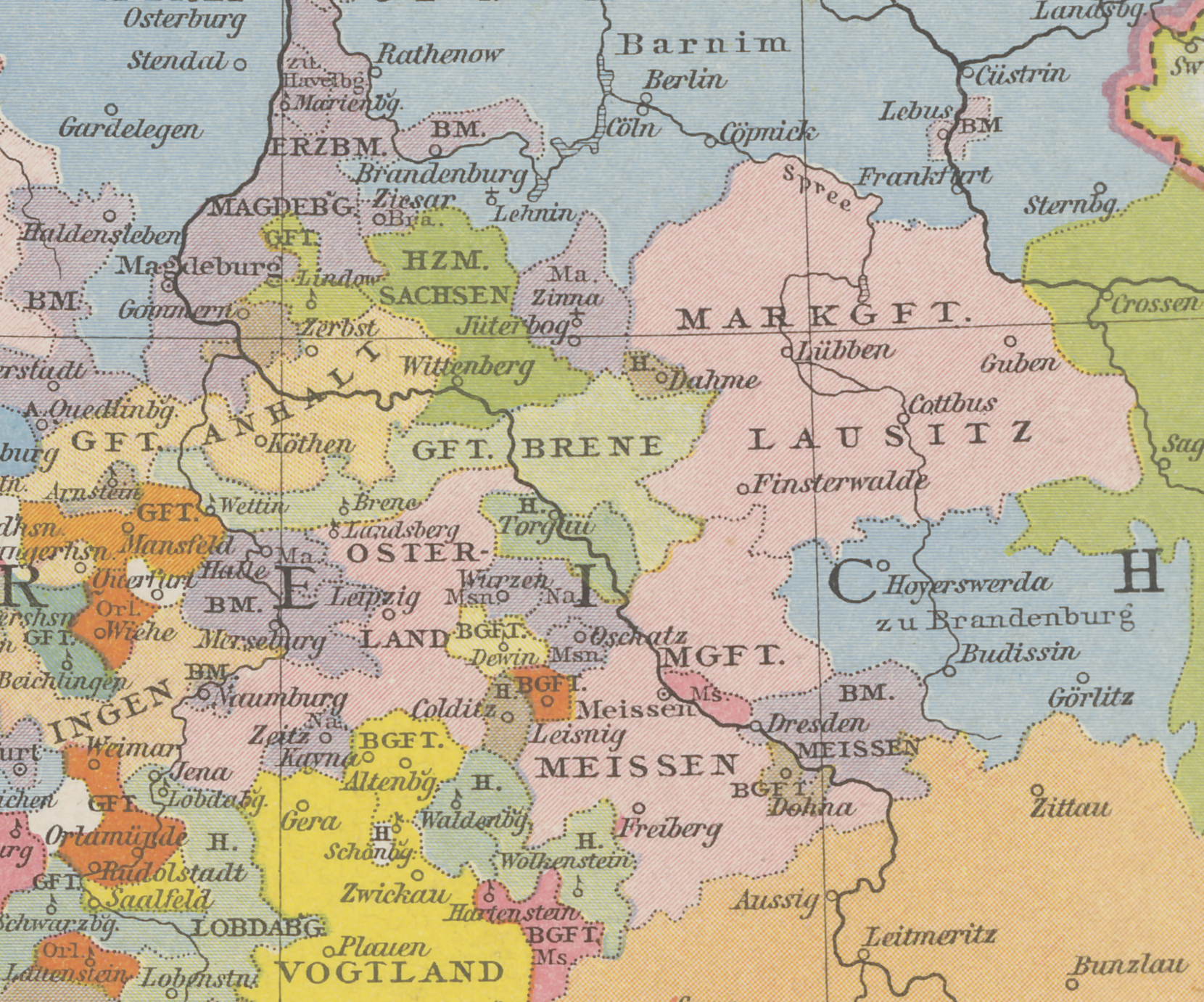
Anhalt (Gft. Anhalt, orange) and the Wittenberg lands of the Duchy of Saxony (Hzm. Sachsen, dark green) around the middle of the 13th century.

In 1142 the duchy passed to Henry the Lion, son of Henry the Proud. The struggle between Henry the Lion and Emperor Frederick I ended with Henry's loss of all his fiefs in 1180. The stem duchy was broken up into numerous fiefs. The Guelphic heirs of Henry the Lion retained only their allodial lands, the Duchy of Brunswick. The ducal title of Saxony went to Bernhard of Anhalt, a younger son of Albert the Bear of Brandenburg and founder of the Ascanian line of Saxon dukes. Besides Anhalt, Bernard received Lauenburg and the country around Wittenberg on the Elbe. These widely separate territories continued after 1260 under separate branches of the Ascanians as Saxe-Lauenburg and Saxe-Wittenberg.

== Electorate and Kingdom of Saxony ==
The Golden Bull of 1356 raised the Duke of Saxe-Wittenberg to the permanent rank of elector, with the right to participate in the election of the Holy Roman Emperor. Electoral Saxony, as his territory was called, was a relatively small area along the middle Elbe. Extending to the south of Electoral Saxony was the Margraviate of Meissen, ruled by the increasingly powerful house of Wettin. The margraves of Meissen acquired (13th–14th century) the larger parts of Thuringia, Lower Lusatia and the intervening territories, and in 1423 Margrave Frederick the Warlike added Electoral Saxony; in 1425 he became Elector Frederick I. Thus, Saxony shifted to east-central and east Germany from northwest Germany.

In 1485 the Wettin lands were partitioned between two sons of Elector Frederick II; the division came to be permanent. Ernest, founder of the Ernestine branch of Wettin, received Electoral Saxony with Wittenberg and most of the Thuringian lands. Albert, founder of the Albertine branch, received a ducal rank and the Meissen territories, including Dresden and Leipzig. Duke Maurice of Saxony, a grandson of Albert and a Protestant, received the electoral title in the 16th century; it remained in the Albertine branch until the dissolution of the Holy Roman Empire in 1806.

The rivalry between Saxony and Brandenburg (after 1701 the kingdom of Prussia) was a decisive factor in later Saxon history, as was the election in 1697 of Augustus II (who was Frederick Augustus I as Elector of Saxony) as King of Poland; the election led to an economic partnership between the declining Poland and Saxony, whose prestige was thereby diminished. In the War of the Austrian Succession, Saxony adhered to what had become its traditional wavering policy, changing sides in the middle of the conflict. The death in 1763 of Augustus III ended the union with Poland.

The period of Saxon rule in Poland marked a time of economic and social decay but also of cultural and artistic flowering. Augustus II and Augustus III were lavish patrons of art and learning and greatly beautified their capital, Dresden. The universities of Wittenberg and Leipzig had long been leading intellectual centers, and 18th-century Leipzig led in the rise of German literature as well as in music, which reached its first peak with Bach.

Saxony sided with Prussia against France early in the French Revolutionary Wars but changed sides in 1806. For this act its elector was raised to royal rank, becoming King Frederick Augustus I. His failure to change sides again before Napoleon's fall cost him (1815) nearly half his kingdom at the Congress of Vienna. The Kingdom of Saxony lost Lower Lusatia, part of Upper Lusatia, and all its northern territory including Wittenberg and Merseburg to Prussia. Its principal remaining cities were Dresden, Leipzig, Chemnitz, and Plauen. The larger part of the territories ceded in 1815 was incorporated with several other Prussian districts into the Prussian province of Saxony, with Magdeburg as its capital. This was united after 1945 with Anhalt to form the state of Saxony-Anhalt and became part of the German Democratic Republic (East Germany) in 1949. From 1952 to 1990 Saxony-Anhalt was divided into the East German districts of Halle and Magdeburg. In 1990, prior to German reunification, the districts were reintegrated as a state.

== Counts of Anhalt ==
During the 9th century, the greater part of Anhalt was included in the Duchy of Saxony. In the 12th century, it came under the rule of Albert the Bear, Margrave of Brandenburg. Albert was descended from Adalbert, Count of Ballenstedt, whose son Esico (d. 1059 or 1060) appears to have been the first to bear the title of Count of Anhalt. Esico's grandson, Otto the Rich, Count of Ballenstedt, was the father of Albert the Bear, who united Anhalt with Brandenburg. When Albert died in 1170, his son Bernard I, who received the title of Duke of Saxony in 1180, became the first Count of Anhalt. Bernard I died in 1212, and Anhalt, separated from Saxony, passed to his son Henry, who in 1218 took the title of prince and was the real founder of the house of Anhalt. Henry is included among the Minnesingers in the Codex Manesse.

== Princes of Anhalt ==
On Henry's death in 1252 his three sons partitioned the principality, founding the lines of Aschersleben, Bernburg and Zerbst. The family ruling in Aschersleben became extinct in 1315, and this district was subsequently incorporated into the neighbouring Bishopric of Halberstadt, thus dividing the territory of Anhalt-Bernburg into two separate pieces. The last prince of the original line of Anhalt-Bernburg died in 1468 and his lands were inherited by the princes of the sole remaining line, that of Anhalt-Zerbst. The territory belonging to this branch of the family had been divided in 1396, and after the acquisition of Bernburg, Prince George I made a further partition of Zerbst (Zerbst and Dessau). Early in the 16th century, owing to the death or abdication of several princes, the family had narrowed down to the two branches of Anhalt-Köthen and Anhalt-Dessau (both issued from Anhalt-Dessau in 1471).

Wolfgang of Anhalt, called "The Confessor", who became prince of Anhalt-Köthen in 1508, was the second ruler in the world to introduce the Reformation in his territory. He was a co-signer of the Augsburg Confession in 1530, and after the Battle of Mühlberg in 1547 was placed under Imperial ban and deprived of his lands by Charles V, Holy Roman Emperor. After the peace of Passau in 1552 he bought back his principality, but as he was childless he surrendered it in 1562 to his kinsmen, the princes of Anhalt-Dessau. Ernest I, Prince of Anhalt-Dessau (d. 1516), left three sons, John II, George III, and Joachim, who jointly ruled their lands for many years and favoured the reformed doctrines, which thus became dominant in Anhalt. About 1546 the three brothers divided their principality and founded the lines of Zerbst, Plötzkau and Dessau. This division, however, was only temporary, as the acquisition of Köthen, and a series of deaths among the ruling princes, enabled Joachim Ernest, a son of John II, to unite the whole of Anhalt under his rule in 1570.

Joachim Ernest died in 1586, and his five sons ruled the land in common until 1603, when Anhalt was again divided, and the lines of Dessau, Bernburg, Plötzkau, Zerbst, and Köthen were re-established. The principality was ravaged during the Thirty Years' War, and in the earlier part of this struggle Christian I of Anhalt-Bernburg took an important part. In 1635 an arrangement was made by the various princes of Anhalt to authorize the eldest member of the family to represent the principality as a whole. This action was probably due to the necessity of maintaining an appearance of unity in view of the disturbed state of European politics at the time.

In 1665 the Anhalt-Köthen branch became extinct, and according to a family compact, this district was inherited by Lebrecht, Prince of Anhalt-Plötzkau, who surrendered Plötzkau to Bernburg and took the title of prince of Anhalt-Köthen. In the same year the princes of Anhalt decided that if any branch of the family became extinct its lands should be equally divided among the remaining branches. This arrangement was carried out after the death of Frederick Augustus, Prince of Anhalt-Zerbst, in 1793, and Zerbst was divided between the three remaining princes. During these years the policy of the different princes was marked, perhaps intentionally, by considerable uniformity. Once or twice Calvinism was favoured by one of the princes, but in general, the house was loyal to the doctrines of Martin Luther. The growth of Prussia provided Anhalt with a formidable neighbour, and the establishment and practice of primogeniture by all branches of the family prevented the further division of the principality.

== 19th century duchies ==
In 1806 Napoleon elevated the remaining states of Anhalt-Bernburg, Anhalt-Dessau, and Anhalt-Köthen to duchies. (Anhalt-Plötzkau and Anhalt-Zerbst had in the meantime ceased to exist.) These duchies were united in 1863 to form a single Duchy of Anhalt, again due to the extinction of the Köthen and Bernburg lines. The new duchy consisted of two large portions: Eastern and Western Anhalt, separated by the interposition of a part of the Prussian Province of Saxony, and five exclaves surrounded by Prussian territory, namely Alsleben, Muhlingen, Dornburg, Goednitz and Tilkerode-Abberode. The eastern and larger portion of the duchy was enclosed by the Prussian government district of Potsdam (in the Prussian province of Brandenburg), and Magdeburg and Merseburg (belonging to the Prussian province of Saxony). The smaller western part (the so-called Upper Duchy or Ballenstedt) was also enclosed by the two latter districts as well as by the duchy of Brunswick-Lüneburg.

The capital of Anhalt (whenever it was a united state) was Dessau.

In 1918 Anhalt became a state within the Weimar Republic (see Free State of Anhalt). After World War II it was united with the former Prussian province of Saxony, forming the new state of Saxony-Anhalt. The state was dissolved in 1952 by the German Democratic Republic government, but was re-established prior to German reunification and is now one of the German Bundesländer.

== State of Saxony-Anhalt ==
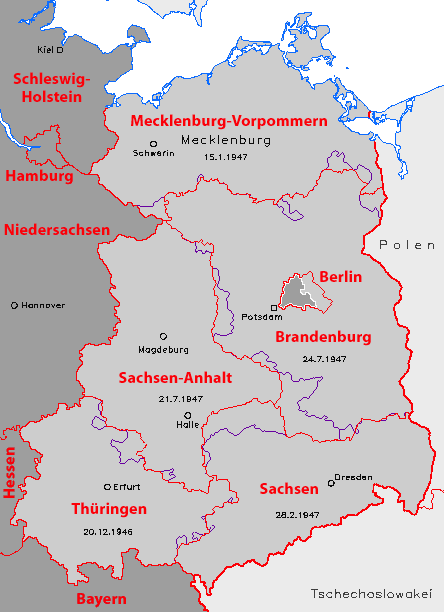
The states of the former East Germany. The modern borders are shown in red while the pre-1952 borders are shown in purple.

Saxony-Anhalt was formed as a province of Prussia in 1945, from the territories of the former Prussian Province of Saxony (except the Regierungsbezirk Erfurt), the Free State of Anhalt, the Free State of Brunswick (Calvörde and the eastern part of the former Blankenburg district) and the formerly Thuringian town Allstedt. See the respective articles for the history of the area before 1945.

When Prussia was disbanded in 1947, the province became the state of Saxony-Anhalt. It became part of the German Democratic Republic (East Germany) in 1949. From 1952 to 1990 Saxony-Anhalt was divided into the East German districts of Halle and Magdeburg. In 1990, in the course of German reunification, the districts were reintegrated as a state.

== Geography ==
The land is undulating in the west and mountainous in the extreme north-west, where it forms part of the Harz range, the Ramberg peak marking the highest elevation at 1900 ft (579 m). From the Harz, the country gently shelves down to the Saale and is fertile between this river and the Elbe. East of the Elbe, the land is mostly a flat sandy plain, with extensive pine forests, interspersed with bog-land and rich pastures. The Elbe is the chief river, intersecting the eastern portion of the former duchy from east to west and joining the Mulde at Rosslau. The navigable Saale takes a northerly direction through the central portion of the territory and receives, on the right, the Fuhne and, on the left, the Wipper and Bode rivers.

The climate is generally mild, less so in the higher regions to the south-west. The area of the former duchy is 906 sq mi (2300 km^{2}), and the population in 1905 was 328,007, a ratio of about 351/sq mi (909/km^{2}).

== Political and religious structure of Anhalt in 1911 ==
As of 1911, Anhalt was divided into the districts of Dessau, Köthen, Zerbst, Bernburg and Ballenstedt, Bernburg being the most populous and Ballenstedt the least. Four towns – Dessau, Bernburg, Köthen, and Zerbst – had populations exceeding 20,000. The inhabitants of the former duchy, who mainly belonged to the upper Saxon race, were, with the exception of about 12,000 Roman Catholics and 1,700 Jews, members of the Evangelical Church of the Union. The supreme ecclesiastical authority was the consistory in Dessau. A synod of 39 members, elected for six years, assembled periodically to deliberate on internal matters pertaining to the organization of the church. The Roman Catholics were under the bishop of Paderborn.

By virtue of a fundamental law proclaimed on September 17, 1859, and subsequently modified by various decrees, the duchy was a constitutional monarchy. The duke bore the title of "Highness" and wielded the executive power while sharing legislative powers with the estates. The diet (Landtag) was composed of thirty-six members, of whom two were appointed by the duke, eight were representatives of landowners paying the highest taxes, two were chosen from among the highest assessed members of the commercial and manufacturing classes, fourteen were electors of the towns and ten represented the rural districts. These representatives were chosen for six years by indirect vote and had to be at least 25 years of age. The duke governed through a minister of state, who was the head of all the departments: finance, home affairs, education, public worship, and statistics.
