= Principality of Anhalt =

State of the Holy Roman Empire

County (Principality) of Anhalt Grafschaft (Fürstentum) Anhalt (German)
- 1218–1806
- Flag Lesser arms of Anhalt

- Map of Anhalt (Zerbst, Dessau, Köthen, Bernburg) in 1793
- Status: Principality
- Capital: Dessau (when united)
- Religion: Roman Catholic (until 1520s); Lutheran (from 1520s)
- Prince of Anhalt
  - 1218–1252: Henry I
- Historical era: Middle Ages
  - Partitioned from Saxony: 1212
  - Elevated to principality: 1218
  - Partitioned¹: 1252–1570
  - Joined Council of Princes: 1582
  - Partitioned²: 1603–1863
  - Principalities³ raised to duchies: 1806
Preceded by	Succeeded by
Duchy of Saxony	Duchy of Anhalt
- Today part of: Germany
- 1: 13th-century partition into Anhalt-Aschersleben, Anhalt-Bernburg and Anhalt-Zerbst. 2: 17th-century partition into Anhalt-Bernburg, Anhalt-Dessau, Anhalt-Köthen, Anhalt-Plötzkau and Anhalt-Zerbst. 3: Anhalt-Bernburg, Anhalt-Dessau and Anhalt-Köthen.

The Principality of Anhalt (German: Fürstentum Anhalt) was a State of the Holy Roman Empire, located in Central Germany, in what is today part of the federal state of Saxony-Anhalt.

Under the rule of the House of Ascania, the Anhalt territory was split off the German stem duchy of Saxony in 1212 and granted to Count Henry I, who was raised to the rank of a Prince of the Holy Roman Empire in 1218. Ruled by Ascanian princes from the High Middle Ages to the Early modern period, Anhalt was divided several times amongst various lines of the dynasty until the dissolution of the Empire in 1806, when Napoleon elevated the remaining states of Anhalt-Bernburg, Anhalt-Dessau and Anhalt-Köthen to duchies.

== Geography ==
The Anhalt territory stretched from the Harz mountain range in the west to the Elbe River and beyond to the Fläming Heath in the east. Upon the 1315 loss of Anhalt-Aschersleben, the lands around Ballenstedt formed a western exclave. The area of the later duchy was 906 sq mi (2,300 km^{2}).

In the west, the land is undulating and in the extreme northwest, where it forms part of the Harz mountains, hilly, with the Ramberg (Harz) peak as the tallest point at 1,900 ft (579 m). From the Harz the country gently shelves down to the Saale; the land between this river and the Elbe is particularly fertile. East of the Elbe, the land is mostly a flat sandy plain, with extensive pine forests, interspersed with bog-land and rich pastures. The Elbe is the chief river, intersecting the eastern portion of the former duchy, from east to west, and at Rosslau is met by the Mulde. The navigable Saale takes a northerly direction through the central portion of the territory and receives, on the right, the Fuhne and, on the left, the Wipper and the Bode.

The climate is generally mild, less so in the higher Harz regions to the south-west.

== History ==
From the 9th century onward, the western parts of the later Anhalt territory up to the Elbe and Saale rivers were included in the Schwabengau region of Eastphalia, the eastern part of the medieval Duchy of Saxony. In the 11th century, it came under the rule of Count Esico of Ballenstedt (died 1059 or 1060), mentioned in a 1036 deed issued by Emperor Conrad II at Tilleda. Possibly a descendant of the Saxon margrave Odo, he owned large allodial lands around Ballenstedt in the Schwabengau as well as in the adjacent Gau Serimunt in the former Saxon Eastern March.

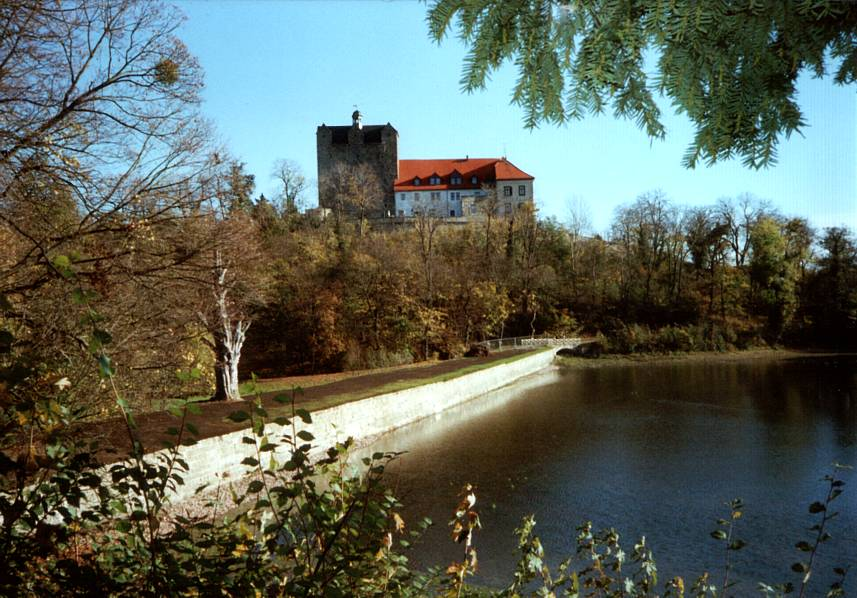
Ballenstedt Castle

Count Esico was succeeded by his son Adalbert II of Ballenstedt, who also appeared as a count in the Saxon Nordthüringgau and further territories in the Eastern March. Adalbert joined the Saxon Rebellion against King Henry IV and was slain in a feud with Egeno II of Konradsburg in 1080. His son Count Otto the Rich appeared as a "Count of Ballenstedt" from 1106. When Emperor Henry V temporarily deprived Lothair of Supplinburg of the Saxon ducal title in 1112, Otto was enfeoffed with the Duchy of Saxony, which, however, he had to renounce shortly afterwards, as Lothair and Henry had reconciled. On the eve of the 1115 Battle of Welfesholz, Otto campaigned the lands of the Polabian Slavs, gaining large estates around Zerbst up to the Hevelli lands ruled by the Hevelli princes.

=== County of Anhalt ===
Until his death in 1123, Count Otto had Anhalt Castle built in the Harz mountains near Harzgerode and appears to have been among the first to assume the title of a "Count of Anhalt". He was the father of Albert the Bear, who temporarily was appointed Margrave of the Saxon Eastern March (or March of Lusatia) by the Saxon duke Lothair of Supplinburg and struggled for the ducal title himself. Albert could not prevail against the Welf duke Henry the Lion, nevertheless he conquered the eastern territories of the former Northern March, which had been lost in the 983 Great Slav Rising, where he established the Margraviate of Brandenburg in 1157. When he died in 1170, his younger son Count Bernhard inherited the Ascanian home territories around Anhalt Castle and after the deposition of Henry the Lion by Emperor Frederick Barbarossa finally became Duke of Saxony in 1180. However, he effectively only ruled over the Eastphalian territories, while the Westphalian and Engern parts of Saxony fell under the control of the Prince-Archbishops of Cologne.

The County of Anhalt finally arose upon the death of Duke Bernhard in 1212, when his sons divided their heritage. The younger Albert I became Duke of Saxony, while the elder Henry I went on to rule the Ascanian lands, now definitely separated from Saxony, as Count of Anhalt. In 1218, Henry I assumed the title of a prince and thereby was the real founder of the princely House of Anhalt.

=== Princes of Anhalt ===
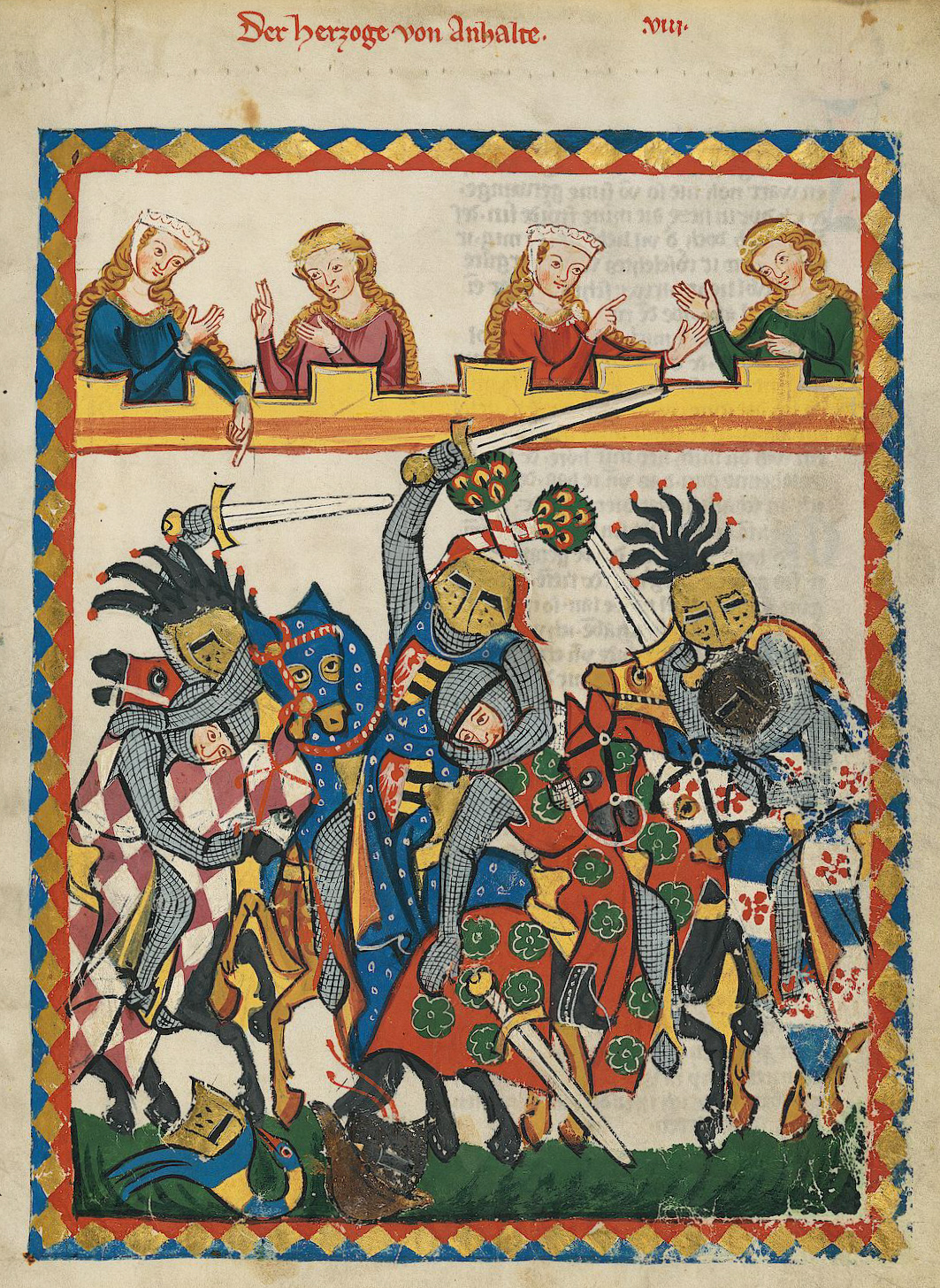
Der Herzoge von Anhalte., Codex Manesse, c. 1305/15

On Henry's death in 1252, his three sons partitioned the principality and founded, respectively, the lines of Aschersleben, Bernburg and Zerbst. The family ruling in Aschersleben became extinct in 1315, and this district was subsequently incorporated in the neighboring Bishopric of Halberstadt, thus dividing the territory of Anhalt-Bernburg in two separate pieces. The last prince of the original line of Anhalt-Bernburg died in 1468 and his lands were inherited by the princes of the sole remaining line, that of Anhalt-Zerbst. The territory belonging to this branch of the family had been divided in 1396, and after the acquisition of Bernburg Prince George I made a further partition of Zerbst (Zerbst and Dessau). Early in the 16th century, however, owing to the death or abdication of several princes, the family had become narrowed down to the two branches of Anhalt-Köthen and Anhalt-Dessau (issued both from Anhalt-Dessau in 1471).

Wolfgang of Anhalt, called the Confessor, who became prince of Anhalt-Köthen in 1508, was the second ruler in the world to introduce the Reformation to his country. He was a co-signer of the Augsburg Confession in 1530, and after the Battle of Mühlberg in 1547 was placed under Imperial ban and deprived of his lands by Emperor Charles V. After the peace of Passau in 1552 he bought back his principality, but as he was childless he surrendered it in 1562 to his kinsmen the princes of Anhalt-Dessau. Ernest I, Prince of Anhalt-Dessau (d. 1516) left three sons, John V, George III, and Joachim, who ruled their lands together for many years, and who favoured the Lutheran doctrine, which thus became dominant in Anhalt. About 1546 the three brothers divided their principality and founded the lines of Zerbst, Plötzkau and Dessau. This division, however, was only temporary, as the acquisition of Köthen, and a series of deaths among the ruling princes, enabled Joachim Ernest, a son of John V, to unite the whole of Anhalt under his rule in 1570.

The first united principality of Anhalt was short-lived, and in 1603 it was split up into the mini states of Anhalt-Dessau, Anhalt-Bernburg, Anhalt-Köthen, Anhalt-Zerbst and Anhalt-Plötzkau.

Joachim Ernest died in 1586, and his five sons ruled the land in common until 1603, when owing to the lack of primogeniture, Anhalt was again divided, and the lines of Dessau, Bernburg, Plötzkau, Zerbst and Köthen were re-founded. The principality was ravaged during the Thirty Years' War, and in the earlier part of this struggle Christian I of Anhalt-Bernburg took an important part. In 1635 an arrangement was made by the various princes of Anhalt, which gave a certain authority to the eldest member of the family, who was thus able to represent the principality as a whole. This proceeding was probably due to the necessity of maintaining an appearance of unity in view of the disturbed state of European politics.

Anhalt partitions 1747-1793

In 1665, the branch of Anhalt-Köthen became extinct, and according to a family compact this district was inherited by Lebrecht, Prince of Anhalt-Plötzkau, who surrendered Plötzkau to Bernburg, and took the title of prince of Anhalt-Köthen. In the same year the princes of Anhalt decided that if any branch of the family became extinct its lands should be equally divided between the remaining branches. This arrangement was carried out after the death of Frederick Augustus, Prince of Anhalt-Zerbst in 1793, and Zerbst was divided between the three remaining princes. During these years the policy of the different princes was marked, perhaps intentionally, by considerable uniformity. Once or twice Calvinism was favoured by a prince, but in general the house was loyal to the doctrines of Martin Luther. The growth of Prussia provided Anhalt with a formidable neighbour, and the long-delayed establishment of primogeniture by all branches of the family prevented further divisions of the principality.

=== Dukes of Anhalt ===
Coat of arms of the 19th-century Duchy of Anhalt.

In 1806, Napoleon elevated the remaining states of Anhalt-Bernburg, Anhalt-Dessau and Anhalt-Köthen to duchies; in the meantime, Anhalt-Plötzkau and Anhalt-Zerbst had ceased to exist. With the Dissolution of the Holy Roman Empire the duchies became fully independent. The extinction of the Köthen line in 1853 and the Bernburg line in 1863, resulted in those states merging with Anhalt-Dessau to form the united Duchy of Anhalt.

== Rulers of Anhalt ==
=== House of Ascania ===
==== Partitions of Anhalt under Ascanian rule ====
County of Anhalt (1030-1212); Raised to: Principality of Anhalt (1212-1252)
Zerbst (1st creation) (1252-1396)				Bernburg (1st creation) (1252-1468)	Aschersleben (1252-1315)
Zerbst (1st creation) (1252-1396)				Bernburg (1st creation) (1252-1468)	Annexed to Bishopric of Halberstadt
Köthen (1st creation) (1396-1562)		Dessau (1st creation) (1396-1561)		Bernburg (1st creation) (1252-1468)	Annexed to Bishopric of Halberstadt
Köthen (1st creation) (1396-1562)			Zerbst (2nd creation) (1544-1562)	Plotzkau (1st creation) (1544-1553)	Annexed to Bishopric of Halberstadt
Principality of Anhalt (Anhalt-Zerbst line) (1562-1603)					Annexed to Bishopric of Halberstadt
Köthen (2nd creation) (1603-1847)	Plotzkau (2nd creation) (1603-1665)	Dessau (2nd creation) (1603-1863)	Zerbst (3rd creation) (1603-1793)	Bernburg (2nd creation) (1603-1863)	Annexed to Bishopric of Halberstadt
Duchy of Anhalt (from Anhalt-Dessau line) (1863-1918)					Annexed to Bishopric of Halberstadt

==== Table of rulers ====
Ruler	Born	Reign	Death	Ruling part	Consort	Notes
Albert I the Bear	c.1100	1123-1170	18 November 1170	Anhalt	Sophie of Winzenburg; 1125 thirteen children	Also Count of Ballenstedt, Duke of Saxony and Margrave of Brandenburg.
Bernard I	c.1134	1170-1212	2 February 1212	Anhalt	Brigitte of Denmark six children Sophia of Thuringia one child Judith of Poland c.1173 no children	Also Count of Ballenstedt and Duke of Saxony
Henry I	1170	1212-1252	1252	Anhalt	Irmgard of Thuringia; 1211 eleven children	First independent ruler of Anhalt. In 1218 becomes Prince of Anhalt. After his death his sons divided the Principality.
Henry II the Fat	1215	1252-1266	12 June 1266	Anhalt-Aschersleben	Matilda of Brunswick-Lüneburg; 1245 two children	Children of Henry I, divided their rule.
Bernard I	1218	1252-1287	1287	Anhalt-Bernburg	Sophia of Denmark; 3 February 1258; Hamburg six children	Children of Henry I, divided their rule.
Siegfried I	1230	1252-1298	25 March 1298	Anhalt-Zerbst	Catherine of Sweden; 17 October 1259 ten children	Children of Henry I, divided their rule.
Regency of Matilda of Brunswick-Lüneburg (1266-1270)						Children of Henry II, ruled jointly, first under their mother, who was elected Abbess of Gernrode in 1275. In 1283, Henry renounced his rights in Otto's favor.
Otto I	c.1245	1266-1304	25 June 1304	Anhalt-Aschersleben	Hedwig of Wrocław; 1283 three children	Children of Henry II, ruled jointly, first under their mother, who was elected Abbess of Gernrode in 1275. In 1283, Henry renounced his rights in Otto's favor.
Henry III	c.1245	1266-1283	12 June 1266	Anhalt-Aschersleben	Unmarried	Children of Henry II, ruled jointly, first under their mother, who was elected Abbess of Gernrode in 1275. In 1283, Henry renounced his rights in Otto's favor.
Bernard II	1260	1287-1323	After 26 December 1323	Anhalt-Bernburg	Helena of Rügen; 27 December 1302 three children	Ruled jointly. After the death of John, Bernard ruled alone.
John I	1258/60	1287-1291	5 June 1291	Anhalt-Bernburg	Unmarried	Ruled jointly. After the death of John, Bernard ruled alone.
Albert I	c.1260	1298-1316	17 August 1316	Anhalt-Zerbst	Liutgard of Holstein-Itzehoe after 1277 two children Agnes of Brandenburg-Stendal; 1300 five children	
Otto II	c.1260	1304-1315	24 July 1315	Anhalt-Aschersleben	Elisabeth of Meissen; 24 August 1309 two children	After his death in 1315 without male heirs, the Principality was annexed by the Bishopric of Halberstadt.
Definitively annexed by the Bishopric of Halberstadt
Albert II	after 1277	1316-1362	17 July 1362	Anhalt-Zerbst	Agnes of Rügen; 2 September 1324 no children Beatrix of Saxe-Wittenberg c.1337 five children	Albert III and Valdemar I ruled jointly, as sons of Albert II. In 1359 Albert III associated his eldest son, Albert IV, but he predeceased him. In 1362, after Albert III's death, is brother Valdemar continued the co-ruling with his nephew John II. Valdemar II, Valdemar I's son, joined John II after his father's death.
Valdemar I	after 1277	1316-1368	7 January 1368	Anhalt-Zerbst	Elisabeth of Saxe-Wittenberg; 22 June 1344 six children Beatrice d'Este; 1365 no children	Albert III and Valdemar I ruled jointly, as sons of Albert II. In 1359 Albert III associated his eldest son, Albert IV, but he predeceased him. In 1362, after Albert III's death, is brother Valdemar continued the co-ruling with his nephew John II. Valdemar II, Valdemar I's son, joined John II after his father's death.
Albert III	c.1337	1359	1 August 1359	Anhalt-Zerbst	Unmarried	Albert III and Valdemar I ruled jointly, as sons of Albert II. In 1359 Albert III associated his eldest son, Albert IV, but he predeceased him. In 1362, after Albert III's death, is brother Valdemar continued the co-ruling with his nephew John II. Valdemar II, Valdemar I's son, joined John II after his father's death.
John II	after 1337	1362-1382	11 April 1382	Anhalt-Zerbst	Elisabeth of Henneberg-Schleusingen; 1366 four children	Albert III and Valdemar I ruled jointly, as sons of Albert II. In 1359 Albert III associated his eldest son, Albert IV, but he predeceased him. In 1362, after Albert III's death, is brother Valdemar continued the co-ruling with his nephew John II. Valdemar II, Valdemar I's son, joined John II after his father's death.
Valdemar II	c.1337	1368-1371	before 24 August 1371	Anhalt-Zerbst	Unmarried	Albert III and Valdemar I ruled jointly, as sons of Albert II. In 1359 Albert III associated his eldest son, Albert IV, but he predeceased him. In 1362, after Albert III's death, is brother Valdemar continued the co-ruling with his nephew John II. Valdemar II, Valdemar I's son, joined John II after his father's death.
Bernard III	1300	1323-1348	20 August 1348	Anhalt-Bernburg	Agnes of Saxe-Wittenberg; 1328 five children Matilda of Anhalt-Zerbst; 1339 no children Matilda of Brunswick-Wolfenbüttel; 1343 two children	
Bernard IV	Before 1339	1348-1354	28 June 1354	Anhalt-Bernburg	Unmarried	
Henry IV	Before 1339	1354-1374	7 July 1374	Anhalt-Bernburg	Sophia of Stolberg before 1348 three children	Bypassed by his older brother Bernard IV as ruler of Anhalt-Bernburg, he only assumed rule of the principality when Bernhard died in 1354.
Otto III	Before 1348	1374-1404	27 February 1404	Anhalt-Bernburg	Unknown two children Lutrudis before 1391 one child	Bypassed his nephew Bernard.
Sigismund I	After 1366	1382-1405	19 January 1405	Anhalt-Dessau (in Zerbst until 1396)	Judith of Querfurt; 1386 eleven children	Sons of John II. Ruled jointly. In 1396 divided the land. Sigismund received Anhalt-Dessau and Albert Anhalt-Köthen.
Albert IV	After 1366	1382-1423	24 November 1423	Anhalt-Köthen (in Zerbst until 1396)	Elisabeth of Mansfeld I before 1398 six children Elisabeth of Querfurt before 4 January 1419 three children	Sons of John II. Ruled jointly. In 1396 divided the land. Sigismund received Anhalt-Dessau and Albert Anhalt-Köthen.
Valdemar III	After 1366	1382-1391	1391	Anhalt-Zerbst	Unmarried	Sons of John II. Ruled jointly. In 1396 divided the land. Sigismund received Anhalt-Dessau and Albert Anhalt-Köthen.
Bernard V	Before 1374	1404-1420	24 June 1420	Anhalt-Bernburg	Elisabeth of Hohnstein-Kelbra; 8 September 1396 one child	Succeeded in reaching the power jointly with his eldest cousin, Otto. As he left no male heirs, the land was inherited by his other cousin, Bernard.
Otto IV	Before 1391	1404-1415	7 July 1374	Anhalt-Bernburg	Unmarried	Ruled jointly with his cousin. Left no descendants.
George I the Elder	1390	1405-1474	21 September 1474	Anhalt-Dessau	Matilda of Anhalt-Bernburg I after 1413 no children Euphemia of Oleśnica; 1432 six children Sophia of Hohnstein after 1442 three children Anna of Lindow-Ruppin; 7 September 1453 nine children	Sons of Sigismund I, ruled jointly. In 1468 inherited Anhalt-Bernburg.
Albert V	After 1390	1405-1469	1469	Anhalt-Dessau	Sophie of Hadmersleben no children	Sons of Sigismund I, ruled jointly. In 1468 inherited Anhalt-Bernburg.
Valdemar IV	c.1386	1405-1417	After 22 July 1417	Anhalt-Dessau	Unmarried	Sons of Sigismund I, ruled jointly. In 1468 inherited Anhalt-Bernburg.
Sigismund II	After 1390	1405-1452	After 22 May 1452	Anhalt-Dessau	Matilda of Anhalt-Bernburg II no children	Sons of Sigismund I, ruled jointly. In 1468 inherited Anhalt-Bernburg.
Bernard VI	Before 1391	1420-1468	2 February 1468	Anhalt-Bernburg	Matilda of Querfurt-Burgscheidungen; 21 October 1419 two children Hedwig of Żagań; 11 March 1434 no children	His children predeceased him, which left him no heirs at his death in 1468. Bernburg was inherited by Anhalt-Dessau line.
Anhalt-Bernburg was annexed to Anhalt-Dessau
Adolph I	After 1398?	1423-1473	28 August 1473	Anhalt-Köthen	Cordula of Lindow-Ruppin; 2 November 1442; Ruppin seven children	Ruled jointly. Adolph ruled with his brother Valdemar V until 1436 and then with Valdemar's son John. In 1471, Adolph concluded a succession contract with George I, Prince of Anhalt-Dessau, which would put his youngest son in Köthen's throne, as Valdemar VI.
Valdemar V	After 1398?	1423-1436	28 August 1473	Anhalt-Köthen	Sophie of Hadmersleben; 1420 no children	Ruled jointly. Adolph ruled with his brother Valdemar V until 1436 and then with Valdemar's son John. In 1471, Adolph concluded a succession contract with George I, Prince of Anhalt-Dessau, which would put his youngest son in Köthen's throne, as Valdemar VI.
John III		1436-1463	1463	Anhalt-Köthen	Unmarried	Ruled jointly. Adolph ruled with his brother Valdemar V until 1436 and then with Valdemar's son John. In 1471, Adolph concluded a succession contract with George I, Prince of Anhalt-Dessau, which would put his youngest son in Köthen's throne, as Valdemar VI.
Valdemar VI (from Anhalt-Dessau line)	1450	1473-1508	1 November 1508	Anhalt-Köthen	Margaret of Schwarzburg; 24 January 1485; Köthen four children	After the contract established with Dessau, this line of princes dominated in Köthen. After the death of Adolph in 1473, George I of Dessau's sons, Valdemar VI and Albert VI, ascended to the principality. After Albert's death, Valdemar co-ruled with his nephews. In 1508, all his co-rulers abdicated to Valdemar VI's son, Wolfgang.
Albert VI	After 1419?	1473-1475	9 January 1475	Anhalt-Köthen	Elisabeth of Mansfeld II; 27 March 1454; Alsleben seven children	After the contract established with Dessau, this line of princes dominated in Köthen. After the death of Adolph in 1473, George I of Dessau's sons, Valdemar VI and Albert VI, ascended to the principality. After Albert's death, Valdemar co-ruled with his nephews. In 1508, all his co-rulers abdicated to Valdemar VI's son, Wolfgang.
Philip	31 May 1468	1475-1500	13 November 1500	Anhalt-Köthen	Unmarried	After the contract established with Dessau, this line of princes dominated in Köthen. After the death of Adolph in 1473, George I of Dessau's sons, Valdemar VI and Albert VI, ascended to the principality. After Albert's death, Valdemar co-ruled with his nephews. In 1508, all his co-rulers abdicated to Valdemar VI's son, Wolfgang.
Magnus	1455	1475-1508	29 October 1524	Anhalt-Köthen	Unmarried	After the contract established with Dessau, this line of princes dominated in Köthen. After the death of Adolph in 1473, George I of Dessau's sons, Valdemar VI and Albert VI, ascended to the principality. After Albert's death, Valdemar co-ruled with his nephews. In 1508, all his co-rulers abdicated to Valdemar VI's son, Wolfgang.
Adolph II	16 October 1458	1475-1508	24 March 1526	Anhalt-Köthen	Unmarried	After the contract established with Dessau, this line of princes dominated in Köthen. After the death of Adolph in 1473, George I of Dessau's sons, Valdemar VI and Albert VI, ascended to the principality. After Albert's death, Valdemar co-ruled with his nephews. In 1508, all his co-rulers abdicated to Valdemar VI's son, Wolfgang.
Ernest I	1454	1474-1516	12 June 1516	Anhalt-Dessau	Margaret of Münsterberg; 20 January 1494; Cottbus four children	Sons of George I, ruled jointly.
George II the Strong	1454	1474-1509	25 April 1509	Anhalt-Dessau	Agnes of Pomerania-Barth; 1478 no children	Sons of George I, ruled jointly.
Sigismund III	1456	1474-1487	27 November 1487	Anhalt-Dessau	Unmarried	Sons of George I, ruled jointly.
Rudolph I the Valiant	1466	1474-1510	7 September 1510	Anhalt-Dessau	Unmarried	Sons of George I, ruled jointly.
Wolfgang the Confessor	1 August 1492	1508-1562	23 March 1566	Anhalt-Köthen	Unmarried	Sole ruler of Köthen. After his abdication without descendants, the Principality was incorporated in the recreated Anhalt-Zerbst.
Regency of Margaret of Münsterberg (1516-1524)						Children of Ernest I, ruled jointly, firstly under their mother. In 1544, the brothers divided the land. Joachim mainteined Dessau to himself; John took Zerbst and refounded Anhalt-Zerbst; George took Plotzkau. After George and Joachim's deaths without descendants, their lands were inherited by their nephews, sons of John III.
Joachim I	7 August 1509	1516-1561	6 December 1561	Anhalt-Dessau	Unmarried	Children of Ernest I, ruled jointly, firstly under their mother. In 1544, the brothers divided the land. Joachim mainteined Dessau to himself; John took Zerbst and refounded Anhalt-Zerbst; George took Plotzkau. After George and Joachim's deaths without descendants, their lands were inherited by their nephews, sons of John III.
John IV	4 September 1504	1516-1551	4 February 1551	Anhalt-Dessau-Zerbst (in Dessau until 1544)	Margaret of Brandenburg; 15 February 1534; Dessau six children	Children of Ernest I, ruled jointly, firstly under their mother. In 1544, the brothers divided the land. Joachim mainteined Dessau to himself; John took Zerbst and refounded Anhalt-Zerbst; George took Plotzkau. After George and Joachim's deaths without descendants, their lands were inherited by their nephews, sons of John III.
George III the God-Blessed	15 August 1507	1516-1553	17 October 1553	Anhalt-Plotzkau (in Dessau until 1544)	Unmarried	Children of Ernest I, ruled jointly, firstly under their mother. In 1544, the brothers divided the land. Joachim mainteined Dessau to himself; John took Zerbst and refounded Anhalt-Zerbst; George took Plotzkau. After George and Joachim's deaths without descendants, their lands were inherited by their nephews, sons of John III.
Charles I	17 November 1534	1551-1561	4 May 1561	Anhalt-Zerbst	Anna of Pomerania; 16 May 1557; Zerbst no children	Sons of John IV. In 1553 inherited Plotzkau from their uncle George III. In 1561 inherited Dessau and Bernburg from their uncle Joachim. In the next year inherited Kothen. From 1570 Joachim Ernest was the sole owner of all Anhalt.
Joachim Ernest	21 October 1536	1551-1562	6 December 1586	Anhalt-Zerbst	Agnes of Barby-Mühlingen; 3 March 1560; Barby six children Eleonore of Württemberg; 9 January 1571; Stuttgart ten children	Sons of John IV. In 1553 inherited Plotzkau from their uncle George III. In 1561 inherited Dessau and Bernburg from their uncle Joachim. In the next year inherited Kothen. From 1570 Joachim Ernest was the sole owner of all Anhalt.
Joachim Ernest	21 October 1536	1562-1586	6 December 1586	Anhalt	Agnes of Barby-Mühlingen; 3 March 1560; Barby six children Eleonore of Württemberg; 9 January 1571; Stuttgart ten children	Sons of John IV. In 1553 inherited Plotzkau from their uncle George III. In 1561 inherited Dessau and Bernburg from their uncle Joachim. In the next year inherited Kothen. From 1570 Joachim Ernest was the sole owner of all Anhalt.
Bernard VII	17 March 1540	1551-1562	1 March 1570	Anhalt-Zerbst	Clara of Brunswick-Lüneburg-Gifhorn; 28 May 1565; Dessau one child	Sons of John IV. In 1553 inherited Plotzkau from their uncle George III. In 1561 inherited Dessau and Bernburg from their uncle Joachim. In the next year inherited Kothen. From 1570 Joachim Ernest was the sole owner of all Anhalt.
Bernard VII	17 March 1540	1562-1570	1 March 1570	Anhalt	Clara of Brunswick-Lüneburg-Gifhorn; 28 May 1565; Dessau one child	Sons of John IV. In 1553 inherited Plotzkau from their uncle George III. In 1561 inherited Dessau and Bernburg from their uncle Joachim. In the next year inherited Kothen. From 1570 Joachim Ernest was the sole owner of all Anhalt.
John George I	9 May 1567	1586-1603	24 May 1618	Anhalt	Dorothea of Mansfeld-Arnstein; 22 February 1588; Hedersleben five children Dorothea of Palatinate-Simmern; 21 February 1595; Heidelberg eleven children	Sons of Joachim Ernest, ruled jointly. In 1603 divided the land again: John George received Dessau; Christian received Bernburg; Augustus received Plötzkau; Rudolph received Zerbst; Louis received Köthen. Augustus served also as regent for his minor nephews in Anhalt-Kothen and Anhalt-Zerbst.
John George I	9 May 1567	1603-1618	24 May 1618	Anhalt-Dessau	Dorothea of Mansfeld-Arnstein; 22 February 1588; Hedersleben five children Dorothea of Palatinate-Simmern; 21 February 1595; Heidelberg eleven children	Sons of Joachim Ernest, ruled jointly. In 1603 divided the land again: John George received Dessau; Christian received Bernburg; Augustus received Plötzkau; Rudolph received Zerbst; Louis received Köthen. Augustus served also as regent for his minor nephews in Anhalt-Kothen and Anhalt-Zerbst.
Christian I	11 May 1568	1586-1603	17 April 1630	Anhalt	Anna of Bentheim-Steinfurt-Tecklenburg-Limburg; 2 July 1595; Lorbach sixteen children	Sons of Joachim Ernest, ruled jointly. In 1603 divided the land again: John George received Dessau; Christian received Bernburg; Augustus received Plötzkau; Rudolph received Zerbst; Louis received Köthen. Augustus served also as regent for his minor nephews in Anhalt-Kothen and Anhalt-Zerbst.
Christian I	11 May 1568	1603-1630	17 April 1630	Anhalt-Bernburg	Anna of Bentheim-Steinfurt-Tecklenburg-Limburg; 2 July 1595; Lorbach sixteen children	Sons of Joachim Ernest, ruled jointly. In 1603 divided the land again: John George received Dessau; Christian received Bernburg; Augustus received Plötzkau; Rudolph received Zerbst; Louis received Köthen. Augustus served also as regent for his minor nephews in Anhalt-Kothen and Anhalt-Zerbst.
Rudolph II	28 October 1576	1586-1603	30 July 1621	Anhalt	Dorothea Hedwig of Brunswick-Wolfenbüttel; 29 December 1605; Wolfenbüttel four children	Sons of Joachim Ernest, ruled jointly. In 1603 divided the land again: John George received Dessau; Christian received Bernburg; Augustus received Plötzkau; Rudolph received Zerbst; Louis received Köthen. Augustus served also as regent for his minor nephews in Anhalt-Kothen and Anhalt-Zerbst.
Rudolph II	28 October 1576	1603-1621	30 July 1621	Anhalt-Zerbst	Dorothea Hedwig of Brunswick-Wolfenbüttel; 29 December 1605; Wolfenbüttel four children	Sons of Joachim Ernest, ruled jointly. In 1603 divided the land again: John George received Dessau; Christian received Bernburg; Augustus received Plötzkau; Rudolph received Zerbst; Louis received Köthen. Augustus served also as regent for his minor nephews in Anhalt-Kothen and Anhalt-Zerbst.
Louis I	17 June 1579	1586-1603	7 January 1650	Anhalt	Amöena Amalie of Bentheim-Steinfurt-Tecklenburg-Limburg; 31 October 1606; Rheda two children Sophia of Lippe; 12 September 1626; Detmold two children	Sons of Joachim Ernest, ruled jointly. In 1603 divided the land again: John George received Dessau; Christian received Bernburg; Augustus received Plötzkau; Rudolph received Zerbst; Louis received Köthen. Augustus served also as regent for his minor nephews in Anhalt-Kothen and Anhalt-Zerbst.
Louis I	17 June 1579	1603-1650	7 January 1650	Anhalt-Köthen	Amöena Amalie of Bentheim-Steinfurt-Tecklenburg-Limburg; 31 October 1606; Rheda two children Sophia of Lippe; 12 September 1626; Detmold two children	Sons of Joachim Ernest, ruled jointly. In 1603 divided the land again: John George received Dessau; Christian received Bernburg; Augustus received Plötzkau; Rudolph received Zerbst; Louis received Köthen. Augustus served also as regent for his minor nephews in Anhalt-Kothen and Anhalt-Zerbst.
Augustus	14 July 1575	1586-1603	22 August 1653	Anhalt	Sibylle of Solms-Laubach; 25 January 1618; Ansbach eight children	Sons of Joachim Ernest, ruled jointly. In 1603 divided the land again: John George received Dessau; Christian received Bernburg; Augustus received Plötzkau; Rudolph received Zerbst; Louis received Köthen. Augustus served also as regent for his minor nephews in Anhalt-Kothen and Anhalt-Zerbst.
Augustus	14 July 1575	1603-1653	22 August 1653	Anhalt-Plötzkau	Sibylle of Solms-Laubach; 25 January 1618; Ansbach eight children	Sons of Joachim Ernest, ruled jointly. In 1603 divided the land again: John George received Dessau; Christian received Bernburg; Augustus received Plötzkau; Rudolph received Zerbst; Louis received Köthen. Augustus served also as regent for his minor nephews in Anhalt-Kothen and Anhalt-Zerbst.
John Casimir	17 December 1596	1618-1660	15 September 1660	Anhalt-Dessau	Agnes of Hesse-Kassel; 18 May 1623; Dessau six children Sophie Margaret of Anhalt-Bernburg; 14 July 1651; Dessau no children	
Regency of Augustus, Prince of Anhalt-Plötzkau (1621-1642)						
John V	24 March 1621	1621-1667	4 July 1667	Anhalt-Zerbst	Sophie Augusta of Holstein-Gottorp; 16 September 1649; Gottorp fourteen children	
Christian II	11 August 1599	1630-1656	22 September 1656	Anhalt-Bernburg	Eleonore Sophie of Schleswig-Holstein-Sonderburg-Plön; 28 February 1625; Ahrensbök fifteen children	
Frederick	16 November 1613	1630-1670	30 June 1670	Anhalt-Bernburg (at Harzgerode)	Johanna Elisabeth of Nassau-Hadamar; 10 August 1642; Bückeburg three children Anna Katharina of Lippe-Detmold (31 July 1612 – 15 October 1659); 26 May 1657; Harzgerode no children	
Regency of Augustus, Prince of Anhalt-Plötzkau, Lebrecht, Prince of Anhalt-Köthen and Emmanuel, Prince of Anhalt-Köthen (1650-1653)						After his death without descendants, his previous regents took over the principality for themselves.
William Louis	3 August 1638	1650-1665	13 April 1665	Anhalt-Köthen	Elisabeth Charlotte of Anhalt-Harzgerode; 25 August 1663; Köthen no children	After his death without descendants, his previous regents took over the principality for themselves.
Lebrecht I	8 April 1622	1653-1665	7 November 1669	Anhalt-Plötzkau	Sophie Ursula Eleonore of Stolberg-Wernigerode; 18 January 1655; Plötzkau no children	Cousins of William Louis, and princes of Anhalt-Plötzkau, they served as regents for their cousin alongside their uncle, Augustus. After William Louis' death in 1665, they took the principality of Köthen for themselves, giving away their inheritance in Plötzkau to Anhalt-Bernburg.
Lebrecht I	8 April 1622	1665-1669	7 November 1669	Anhalt-Köthen	Sophie Ursula Eleonore of Stolberg-Wernigerode; 18 January 1655; Plötzkau no children	Cousins of William Louis, and princes of Anhalt-Plötzkau, they served as regents for their cousin alongside their uncle, Augustus. After William Louis' death in 1665, they took the principality of Köthen for themselves, giving away their inheritance in Plötzkau to Anhalt-Bernburg.
Emmanuel	6 October 1631	1653-1665	8 November 1670	Anhalt-Plötzkau	Anna Eleonore of Stolberg-Wernigerode; 23 March 1670; Ilsenburg one child	Cousins of William Louis, and princes of Anhalt-Plötzkau, they served as regents for their cousin alongside their uncle, Augustus. After William Louis' death in 1665, they took the principality of Köthen for themselves, giving away their inheritance in Plötzkau to Anhalt-Bernburg.
Emmanuel	6 October 1631	1665-1670	8 November 1670	Anhalt-Köthen	Anna Eleonore of Stolberg-Wernigerode; 23 March 1670; Ilsenburg one child	Cousins of William Louis, and princes of Anhalt-Plötzkau, they served as regents for their cousin alongside their uncle, Augustus. After William Louis' death in 1665, they took the principality of Köthen for themselves, giving away their inheritance in Plötzkau to Anhalt-Bernburg.
Plotzkau definitively annexed to the Principality of Anhalt-Bernburg
Victor Amadeus	6 October 1634	1656-1718	14 February 1718	Anhalt-Bernburg	Elisabeth of Palatinate-Zweibrücken; 16 October 1667; Meisenheim six children	Annexed Anhalt-Plötzkau in 1665.
John George II	17 November 1627	1660-1693	7 August 1693	Anhalt-Dessau	Henriette Catherine of Nassau; 9 September 1659; Groningen five children	Prince of Anhalt-Dessau, he also served as regent for his cousin, Emmanuel Lebrecht of Anhalt-Kothen, together with the prince's mother, Anna Eleonore of Stolberg-Wernigerode.
Regency of Sophie Augusta of Holstein-Gottorp (1667-1674)						Children of John V, divided the rule.
Charles William	16 October 1652	1667-1718	3 November 1718	Anhalt-Zerbst	Sophia of Saxe-Weissenfels; 18 June 1676; Halle three children	Children of John V, divided the rule.
John Louis I	4 May 1656	1667-1704	1 November 1704	Anhalt-Zerbst (at Dornburg)	Christine Eleonore of Zeutsch (5 June 1666 – 17 May 1699); 23 July 1687; Halle seven children	Children of John V, divided the rule.
Regencies of Anna Eleonore of Stolberg-Wernigerode (1670-1690) and John George II, Prince of Anhalt-Dessau (1690-1692)						
Emmanuel Lebrecht	20 May 1671	1670-1704	30 May 1704	Anhalt-Köthen	Gisela Agnes of Rath; 30 September 1692; Nienburg (morganatic) ten children	
William Louis	18 August 1643	1670-1709	14 October 1709	Anhalt-Bernburg (at Harzgerode)	Elisabeth Juliana of Solms-Laubach (6 March 1631 – 2 January 1693)25 July 1671; Laubach no children Sophie Auguste of Nassau-Dillenburg (28 April 1666 – 14 January 1733); 20 October 1695; Frederiksborg no children	After his death, Harzgerode merged again in Bernburg.
Regency of Henriette Catherine of Nassau (1693-1698)						
Leopold I	3 July 1676	1693-1747	7 April 1747	Anhalt-Dessau	Anna Louise Föhse; 8 September 1698; Dessau (morganatic) ten children	
Regency of Gisela Agnes of Rath (1704-1715)						With no male heirs, he was succeeded by his brother.
Leopold	29 November 1694	1704-1728	19 November 1728	Anhalt-Köthen	Frederica Henriette of Anhalt-Bernburg; 11 December 1721; Bernburg one child Charlotte Frederike of Nassau-Siegen; 27 June 1725; Weimar two children	With no male heirs, he was succeeded by his brother.
Charles Frederick	13 July 1668	1718-1721	22 April 1721	Anhalt-Bernburg	Sophie Albertine of Solms-Sonnenwalde; 25 June 1692; Bernburg six children Wilhelmine Charlotte Nüssler; 1 May 1715; Bernburg	Children of Victor Amadeus, divided their rule.
Lebrecht	28 June 1669	1718-1727	17 May 1727	Anhalt-Bernburg (in Zeitz-Hoym)	Charlotte of Nassau-Schaumburg; Schaumburg Castle; 12 April 1692 five children Eberhardine of Weede (9 August 1685 – 13 February 1724); 27 June 1702; Grave six children Sophie Sibylla of Ingersleben (18 March 1684 – 31 March 1726); 14 September 1725 (morganatic) no children	Children of Victor Amadeus, divided their rule.
John Augustus	29 July 1677	1718-1742	7 November 1742	Anhalt-Zerbst	Fredericka of Saxe-Gotha-Altenburg; 25 May 1702; Zerbst no children	Died without issue. Zerbst was inherited by his cousins from Dornburg.
Victor Frederick	20 September 1700	1721-1765	18 May 1765	Anhalt-Bernburg	Louise of Anhalt-Dessau; 25 November 1724; Dessau one child Sophie Albertine Fredericka of Brandenburg-Schwedt; 22 May 1733; Potsdam five children Konstanze Fredericka Schmidt; 13 November 1750; Bernburg (morganatic) one child	
Victor I Amadeus	7 September 1693	1727-1772	15 April 1772	Anhalt-Bernburg (in Zeitz-Hoym in 1727; in Schaumburg-Hoym from 1727)	Charlotte Louise of Isenburg-Birstein (31 July 1680 – 2 January 1739); 22 November 1714; Birstein six children Hedwig Sophie Henckel of Donnersmarck; 14 February 1740; Pölzig six children	
Augustus Louis	9 June 1697	1728-1755	6 August 1755	Anhalt-Köthen	Agnes Wilhelmine von Wuthenau; 23 January 1722; Dresden (morganatic) two children Christine Johanna Emilie of Promnitz-Pless; 14 January 1726; Sorau five children Anna Fredericka of Promnitz-Pless; 21 November 1732; Sorau two children	
John Louis	23 June 1688	1704-1746 1742-1746	5 November 1746	Anhalt-Zerbst (in Dornburg) Anhalt-Zerbst	Unmarried	First cousins of their predecessor, they were Princes of Dornburg, until its ending by joining it with the inherited Principality of Zerbst. Ruled jointly. after John Louis' death, Christian ruled alone.
Christian August	29 November 1690	1704-1747 1742-1747	16 March 1747	Anhalt-Zerbst (in Dornburg) Anhalt-Zerbst	Joanna Elisabeth of Holstein-Gottorp; 8 November 1727; Vechelde five children	First cousins of their predecessor, they were Princes of Dornburg, until its ending by joining it with the inherited Principality of Zerbst. Ruled jointly. after John Louis' death, Christian ruled alone.
Christian Louis	5 November 1691	1704-1710	20 October 1710	Anhalt-Zerbst (in Dornburg)	Unmarried	First cousins of their predecessor, they were Princes of Dornburg, until its ending by joining it with the inherited Principality of Zerbst. Ruled jointly. after John Louis' death, Christian ruled alone.
John Frederick	14 July 1695	1704-1742	11 May 1742	Anhalt-Zerbst (in Dornburg)	Cajetana of Sperling (d.17 December 1742) no children	First cousins of their predecessor, they were Princes of Dornburg, until its ending by joining it with the inherited Principality of Zerbst. Ruled jointly. after John Louis' death, Christian ruled alone.
Leopold II Maximilian	25 December 1700	1747-1751	16 December 1751	Anhalt-Dessau	Gisela Agnes of Anhalt-Köthen; 25 May 1737; Bernburg seven children	
Regency of Joanna Elisabeth of Holstein-Gottorp (1747-1752)						
Frederick August	8 August 1734	1747-1793	3 March 1793	Anhalt-Zerbst	Caroline Wilhelmina Sophia of Hesse-Kassel; 17 November 1753; Zerbst no children Friederike Auguste Sophie of Anhalt-Bernburg; 22 May 1764; Ballenstedt no children	
Definitively annexed by the Principality of Anhalt-Dessau
Regency of Dietrich of Anhalt-Dessau (1751-1758)						Prince of Anhalt-Dessau, also served as regent for his cousin, Louis Augustus Karl Frederick Emil of Anhalt-Kothen. After his death the regency in Anhalt-Kothen passed together with the principality of Anhalt-Dessau to his son.
Leopold III Frederick Franz	10 August 1740	1751-1817	9 August 1817	Anhalt-Dessau	Louise Henriette Wilhelmine of Brandenburg-Schwedt; 25 July 1767; Charlottenburg two children	Prince of Anhalt-Dessau, also served as regent for his cousin, Louis Augustus Karl Frederick Emil of Anhalt-Kothen. After his death the regency in Anhalt-Kothen passed together with the principality of Anhalt-Dessau to his son.
Charles George Lebrecht	15 August 1730	1755-1789	17 October 1789	Anhalt-Köthen	Louise Charlotte of Schleswig-Holstein-Sonderburg-Glücksburg; 26 July 1763; Glücksburg six children	
Frederick Albert	15 August 1735	1765-1796	9 April 1796	Anhalt-Bernburg	Louise Albertine of Schleswig-Holstein-Sonderburg-Plön; 25 November 1724; Augustenburg two children	
Charles Louis	16 May 1723	1772-1806	20 August 1806	Anhalt-Bernburg (in Schaumburg-Hoym)	Benjamine Gertrude Keiser (1 January 1729 – 6 January 1787); 25 March 1748; Stevensweert (morganatic) Amalia Eleonora of Solms-Braunfels (22 November 1734 – 19 April 1811); 12 December 1765; Braunfels five children	
Augustus Christian Frederick	18 November 1769	1789-1812	5 May 1812	Anhalt-Köthen	Fredericka of Nassau-Usingen; 9 February 1792; Frankfurt-am-Main no children	In 1806 became Duke of Anhalt-Köthen. Left no descendants, and was succeeded by his nephew.
Alexius Frederick Christian	12 June 1767	1796-1834	24 March 1834	Anhalt-Bernburg	Marie Friederike of Hesse-Kassel; 29 November 1794; Kassel (annulled 1817) four children Dorothea Fredericka of Sonnenberg; 11 January 1818; Ballenstedt (morganatic) no children Ernestine Charlotte of Sonnenberg; 2 May 1819; Bernburg (morganatic) no children	In 1803 became Duke of Anhalt-Bernburg.
Victor II Charles	2 November 1767	1806-1812	22 April 1812	Anhalt-Bernburg (in Schaumburg-Hoym)	Amelia of Nassau-Weilburg; 29 October 1793; Weilburg four children	
Regencies of Leopold III, Duke of Anhalt-Dessau (1812-1817) and Leopold IV, Duke of Anhalt (1817-1818)						Died as a minor, never ruled by his own.
Louis Augustus Karl	20 September 1802	1812-1818	18 December 1818	Anhalt-Köthen	Unmarried	Died as a minor, never ruled by his own.
Frederick	29 November 1741	1812	24 December 1812	Anhalt-Bernburg (in Schaumburg-Hoym)	Unmarried	Son of Victor I. After his childless death, Hoym and Holzappel were inherited by his niece Hermine (daughter of Victor II), while Hoym merged in Bernburg again.
Hermine	2 December 1797	1812-1817	14 September 1817	Anhalt-Bernburg (in Schaumburg and Holzappel)	Archduke Joseph, Palatine of Hungary; 30 August 1815; Schaumburg Castle two children	Daughter of Victor II. After her death her lands probably merged again in Bernburg.
Frederick Ferdinand	25 June 1769	1818-1830	23 August 1830	Anhalt-Köthen	Maria Dorothea Henriette Louise of Schleswig-Holstein-Sonderburg-Beck; 26 July 1763; Lindenau bei Heiligenbeil no children Julie of Brandenburg; 20 May 1816; Berlin no children	From the Anhalt-Pless line, cousin of his predecessor. Attempted, with no success, to reinstall Catholicism in his duchy.
Henry	30 July 1778	1830-1847	23 November 1847	Anhalt-Köthen	Auguste Fredericka Espérance Reuss of Köstritz; 18 May 1819; Trebschen no children	Left no descendants. His lands were inherited by Leopold of Anhalt-Dessau.
Definitively annexed to the Principality of Anhalt-Dessau
Alexander Charles	2 March 1805	1834-1863	19 August 1863	Anhalt-Bernburg	Friederike of Schleswig-Holstein-Sonderburg-Glücksburg; 30 October 1834; Gottorp no children	Left no male descendants. Bernburg reverted to Anhalt-Dessau.
Definitively annexed to the Principality of Anhalt-Dessau
Leopold IV Frederick	1 October 1794	1817-1863	22 May 1871	Anhalt-Dessau	Frederica Wilhelmina of Prussia; 18 April 1818; Berlin six children	Prince of Anhalt-Dessau, ended the regency in Kothen after his cousin's death (1818). In 1863 he reunites Anhalt under his rule, and becomes its first duke.
Leopold IV Frederick	1 October 1794	1863-1871	22 May 1871	Anhalt	Frederica Wilhelmina of Prussia; 18 April 1818; Berlin six children	Prince of Anhalt-Dessau, ended the regency in Kothen after his cousin's death (1818). In 1863 he reunites Anhalt under his rule, and becomes its first duke.
Frederick I	29 April 1831	1871-1904	24 January 1904	Anhalt	Antoinette of Saxe-Altenburg; 22 April 1854; Altenburg six children	
Frederick II	19 August 1856	1904-1918	21 April 1918	Anhalt	Marie of Baden; 2 July 1889; Karlsruhe no children	Left no descendants. He was succeeded by his brother.
Edward	18 April 1861	1918	13 September 1918	Anhalt	Louise Charlotte of Saxe-Altenburg; 6 February 1895; Altenburg (annulled 26 January 1918) six children	Brother of his predecessor. Ruled 18 April to 13 September.
Joachim Ernest II	11 January 1901	1918	18 February 1947	Anhalt	Elisabeth Strickrodt; 3 March 1927; Ballenstedt (morganatic, annulled 1929) no children Edda-Charlotte von Stephani-Marwitz; 15 October 1929; Ballenstedt (morganatic) five children	Ruled 13 September to 12 November. Monarchy abolished in that year.

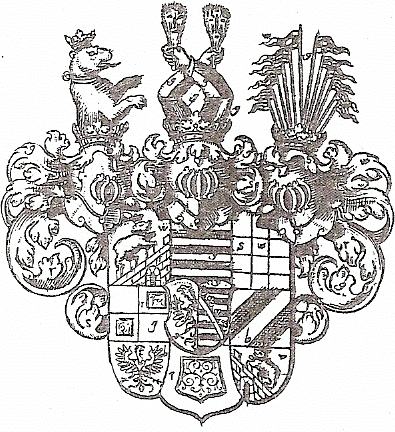
Coat of arms of the duchy 1703
