= Duchy of Anhalt =

German duchy (1806–1918)

Duchy of Anhalt Herzogtum Anhalt
- 1863–1918
- Flag Coat of arms

- The Duchy of Anhalt within the German Empire

- Map of the Duchy of Anhalt (1863-1918)
- Status: Member of the Confederation of the Rhine; Member of the German Confederation; State of the North German Confederation; State of the German Empire
- Capital: Dessau (when united)
- Common languages: German, Low German
- Religion: Evangelical Church of Anhalt
- Government: Duchy
- Duke
  - 1863–1871: Leopold IV (first)
  - 1918: Joachim Ernst (last)
- Historical era: Middle Ages
  - Counties^{3} raised to duchies: 1806
  - Köthen and Bernburg lines extinct; duchies united under Dessau line: 1863
  - German Revolution: 1918

Area
  - Total: 3,800 km^{2} (1,500 sq mi)
Preceded by
Principality of Anhalt
Anhalt-Bernburg
Anhalt-Köthen
Succeeded by
Free State of Anhalt
- Today part of: Germany
- 1. 13th century partition into Anhalt-Aschersleben, Anhalt-Bernburg and Anhalt-Zerbst.; 2. 17th century partition into Anhalt-Bernburg, Anhalt-Dessau, Anhalt-Köthen, Anhalt-Plötzkau and Anhalt-Zerbst.; 3. The three counties raised to duchies by Napoleon in 1806 were Anhalt-Bernburg, Anhalt-Dessau and Anhalt-Köthen.

The Duchy of Anhalt (German: Herzogtum Anhalt) was a historical German duchy. The duchy was located between the Harz Mountains in the west and the River Elbe and beyond to the Fläming Heath in the east. The territory was once ruled by the House of Ascania, and is now part of the federal state of Saxony-Anhalt.

== History ==
Anhalt's origins lie in the Principality of Anhalt, a state of the Holy Roman Empire.

=== Dukes of Anhalt ===
During the 9th century, most of Anhalt was part of the Duchy of Saxony. In the 12th century, it came under the rule of Albert the Bear, margrave of Brandenburg. Albert was descended from Albert, count of Ballenstedt, whose son Esico (died 1059 or 1060) appears to have been the first to bear the title of count of Anhalt. Esico's grandson, Otto the Rich, count of Ballenstedt, was the father of Albert the Bear, who united Anhalt with the Margraviate of Brandenburg (March of Brandenburg). When Albert died in 1170, his son Bernard, who received the title of duke of Saxony in 1180, became count of Anhalt. Bernard died in 1212, and Anhalt, separated from Saxony, passed to his son Henry I, who in 1218 took the title of prince and was the real founder of the house of Anhalt.

=== Princes of Anhalt ===
Over the next six hundred years multiple divisions of the Anhalt principality took place as younger sons were granted appanages and founded lines of their own. These divisions included:

- Anhalt-Bernburg 1252–1468, 1603–1863
- Anhalt-Dessau 1396–1561, 1603–1863
- Anhalt-Köthen 1396–1562, 1603–1853
- Anhalt-Plötzkau 1544–1553, 1603–1665
- Anhalt-Zerbst 1252–1396, 1544–1796

=== 19th century duchies ===
In 1806, Napoleon elevated the remaining states of Anhalt-Bernburg, Anhalt-Dessau and Anhalt-Köthen to duchies (Anhalt-Plötzkau and Anhalt-Zerbst had ceased to exist in the meantime). These duchies were united in 1863 to form a united Anhalt again due to the extinction of the Köthen and Bernburg lines. The new duchy consisted of two large portions – Eastern and Western Anhalt, separated by the interposition of a part of the Prussian Province of Saxony – and of five enclaves surrounded by Prussian territory: Alsleben, Muhlingen, Dornburg, Gödnitz and Tilkerode-Abberode. The eastern and larger portion of the duchy was enclosed by the Prussian government district of Potsdam (in the Prussian Province of Brandenburg), Province of Magdeburg and Merseburg (belonging to the Prussian Province of Saxony). The western or smaller portion (the so-called Upper Duchy or Ballenstedt) was also enclosed by the two latter districts and by the Duchy of Brunswick.

The capital of Anhalt (at the times when it was a united state) was Dessau.

In 1918, Anhalt became a state within the Weimar Republic (see Free State of Anhalt). After World War II it was united with the Prussian parts of Saxony in order to form the new state of Saxony-Anhalt. Having been dissolved in 1952, the state was reestablished prior to the German reunification and is now part of the Bundesland Saxony-Anhalt in Germany.

==== Constitution ====
The duchy, by virtue of a fundamental law, proclaimed on September 17, 1859 and subsequently modified by various decrees, was a constitutional monarchy. The duke, who was addressed as "Highness," wielded the executive power while sharing the legislation with the estates. The diet (Landtag) was composed of thirty-six members, of whom two were appointed by the duke, eight were representatives of landowners paying the highest taxes, two of the highest assessed members of the commercial and manufacturing classes, fourteen of the other electors of the towns and ten of the rural districts. The representatives were chosen for six years by indirect vote and must have completed their twenty-fifth year. The duke governed through a minister of state, who was the praeses of all the departments—finance, home affairs, education, public worship and statistics.

== Geography ==
In the west, the land is undulating and in the extreme southwest, where it forms part of the Harz range, mountainous, the Ramberg peak being the tallest at 1900 ft (579 m). From the Harz, the country gently slopes down to the Saale; between this river and the Elbe is fertile country. East of the Elbe, the land is mostly a flat sandy plain, with extensive pine forests, interspersed with bog-land and rich pastures. The Elbe is the chief river, intersecting the eastern portion of the former duchy, from east to west, and at Rosslau is met by the Mulde. The navigable Saale takes a northerly direction through the western portion of the eastern part of the territory and receives, on the right, the Fuhne and, on the left, the Wipper and the Bode.

The climate is generally mild, less so in the higher regions to the south-west. The area of the former duchy is 906 square miles (2,300 km^{2}). The population was 203,354 in 1871 and 328,007 in 1905.

The country was divided into the districts of Dessau, Köthen, Zerbst, Bernburg and Ballenstedt with Bernburg being the most, and Ballenstedt the least. Four towns, namely Dessau, Bernburg, Köthen and Zerbst, had populations exceeding 20,000. The inhabitants of the former duchy, who were primarily upper Saxons, belonged, with the exception of about 12,000 Roman Catholics and 1700 Jews, to the Evangelical Church. The supreme ecclesiastical authority was the consistory in Dessau; while a synod of 39 members, elected for six years, assembled at periods to deliberate on internal matters touching the organization of Church of Anhalt. The Roman Catholics were under the Bishop of Paderborn.

== Rulers of Anhalt, Middle Ages ==
- Esico ?–1059/1060, first Count of Anhalt
- Otto the Rich, Count of Ballenstedt
- Albert the Bear ?–1170
- Bernard ?–1212
- Henry I 1212–1252

== Dukes of Anhalt, 1863–1918 ==
- Leopold IV 1863–1871
- Friedrich I 1871–1904
- Friedrich II 1904–1918
- Eduard 1918
- Joachim Ernst 1918

== See also ==
- Former countries in Europe after 1815
