= Siegfried (archbishop of Bremen) =

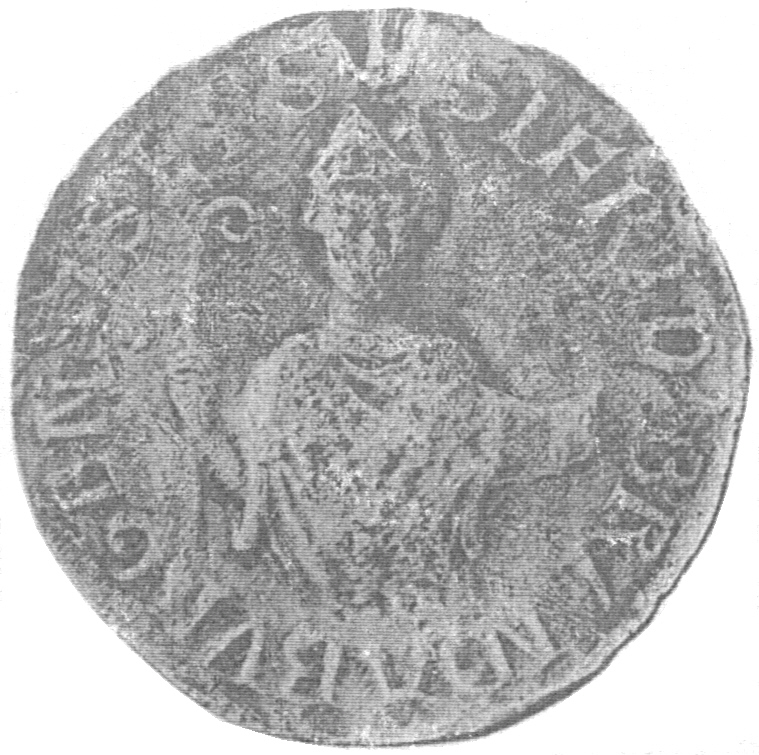
The seal of Bishop Siegfried I of 1173. Inscription: SIFRID[VS] BRANDABVRGENSIS EP[ISCOPV]S. Omissions in edged brackets.

Siegfried of Anhalt (c. 1132 – 24 October 1184) was born as the third son of Sophie of Winzenburg and her husband Albert the Bear, then Count of Anhalt, of the House of Ascania. In 1168 he was elected Archbishop of Bremen. Afterward he became Prince-Bishop of Brandenburg (1173–1179) as Siegfried I. In 1179 he succeeded in getting it upgraded to a Prince-Archbishopric of imperial immediacy in 1180, thus becoming Prince-Archbishop of Bremen. He was a strong advocate of Ascanian clan interests.

== Before ascending the see ==
Probably before 1147 Siegfried joined the Our Lady Friary in Magdeburg as a secular canon. His father's donations of rural possessions to the monastery in 1151 are probably related to providing Siegfried a princely livelihood within the monastery. Siegfried appears for the first time as a witness in a document of 19 September 1154 in Halle upon Saale alongside his father and brothers. They altogether testified, that Bremen's Archbishop Hartwig, Count of Stade confirmed to have received a donation of Siegfried's paternal grandmother Eilika in Paulinzell. In 1155 Siegfried, his parents, brothers and sisters attended the inauguration ceremony of the abbey of the monastery in Leitzkau. The following years he officiated as canon in Magdeburg.

== Historical background ==
The Archdiocese of Bremen and its respective incumbent was one of the players in the struggle for feudal positions. The Archbishop had no princely rank under the emperor, but held all the possessions, privileges, etc., that belonged to the See as mediate tenant, meaning a vassal of the Duchy of Saxony, where the possessions were located, with the Duke himself being a vassal of the Emperor. Hartwig of Stade, as Hartwig I Archbishop of Bremen, was the last male representative of the comital family of Stade. When he died in 1168, the County of Stade was reverted. The Bremian Chapter, which had elected Hartwig for Archbishop in expectancy for the county, claimed it would be a fief of the Bremian See. Henry the Lion of the House of Guelph, replied with a twofold claim: (1) he would be the heir, giving some obscure arguments on his relation to Stade's comital family; (2) the then Archbishop Adalbero of Bremen allegedly had promised Henry's mother Wulfhild to enfeoff her with the county, a very dubious claim. In fact Henry, then 14 years old, simply wanted to increase his realm. Therefore, Henry occupied the County of Stade with his troops.

Henry the Lion, Duke of Saxony, Westphalia and Angria and of Bavaria, was an ambitious man, striving for more independence and rejecting the imperial overlordship. He gained strong allies through marriage with Matilda Plantagenêt, the daughter of Henry II of England and Eleanor of Aquitaine and sister of Richard Lionheart, and by way of alliance with Prince Pribislav of Mecklenburg and Duke Casimir I of Pomerania.

Henry's paternal cousin Emperor Frederick I Barbarossa, House of Hohenstaufen, steadily had to assert himself against his princely vassals and the Roman Catholic Church. Frederick refused to receive the rank as Emperor like a papal fief, which is why he conflicted with Pope Alexander III.

Siegfried's Ascanian clan, domiciled at the middle Elbe river and then led by Albert the Bear, a maternal cousin of Henry the Lion, also strove for more power and territories to conquer westwards from Saxon and eastwards from Slavic rulers. Nevertheless, the Ascanians by far were not as successful as Henry the Lion. Siegfried's brothers held different territories conquered by their father and them:

- Otto of Anhalt, became as Otto I Margrave of Brandenburg after Albert the Bear died
- Hermann of Anhalt, became Count of Weimar-Orlamünde
- Siegfried of Anhalt
- Heinrich of Anhalt, canon at Magdeburg's Cathedral
- Albert of Anhalt, became Count of Ballenstedt
- Dietrich of Anhalt, became Count of Werben
- Bernhard of Anhalt, inherited the Ascanian allodially owned County of Anhalt,

== The first struggle for the Bremian See ==
In 1168, after the death of Bremen's Archbishop Hartwig I, the Bremian cathedral chapter elected two rival Archbishops. The capitulars, opposing Henry the Lion and his claim to the County of Stade, voted for Siegfried, while the Guelphic party elected Otbertus, the dean of the Chapter.

Henry's loyal vassal, Gunzelin of Hagen, first Count of Schwerin, took martial actions against anti-Guelphic partisans, provoking an upheaval in Bremen. The Guelphic party won and Siegfried had to flee to Oldenburg. Frederick I declared the elections null and void on the Diet (1169) in Bamberg. Anyway, Frederick I did not like Siegfried's loyalty to Pope Alexander III, with whom Frederick was quarrelling. Frederick I aligned himself with Henry the Lion, in order to ascertain his loyalty, and appointed the Bremian capitular provost Baldwin I to the see, Alexander III confirmed that. Baldwin was an aged and compliant man. Baldwin ceded the County of Stade to Henry and alienated many other archiepiscopal estates. By the end of 1168 Ascanians and Guelphs confronted in skirmishes.

== Siegfried as prince-bishop of Brandenburg ==
Siegfried now used to call himself Bishop Elect of Bremen. Through the influence of his friend, Wichmann of Seeburg, Archbishop of Magdeburg, in 1173 the Brandenburgian Chapter elected Siegfried the new Prince-Bishop of Brandenburg, succeeding the late Wilmar. Not much is known about Siegfried's period in office. Several times he stayed with Wichmann or Alexander III.

== Fighting again for the Bremian See ==
In 1176, at the Battle of Legnano, Frederick I lost his Italian campaign, blaming it on Henry the Lion, who had refused to support him. Henry was busy extending and defending his own reign against the quarrelling clan of the Ascanians. Wichmann visited Frederick I in Italy in order to fathom in how far Siegfried's claim to the Bremian See could be enforced – e.g. in the scope of the Peace of Venice. Frederick I declared Baldwin's investiture as Archbishop and all his alienations of archiepiscopal possessions to be invalid. When in 1178 Baldwin received the official notification of his dismissal, he died. In 1179 Siegfried attended the Third Council of the Lateran in Rome, while the Bremian Chapter elected another Guelphic partisan, Berthold, for Archbishop. Both Frederick I and Alexander III originally wanted to confirm this knowledgeable man in his new position. But when in 1179 Berthold arrived in Rome to gain his papal confirmation, Alexander III declared Berthold's election null and void.

Inferior in warfare, many of Henry's enemies litigated him in lawsuits. Henry absented at the trials, to which he had been summoned. Thus the Diet decided to bring Henry before a judge, using military violence (German: Reichsheerfahrt 1180-1181). Frederick I Barbarossa and his allies, many of them vassals and former supporters of Duke Henry the Lion, had defeated him. In 1180 Frederick I Barbarossa stripped Henry the Lion of his duchies. In 1182, he and his wife went into exile.

In 1180, at the Diet in Gelnhausen, the attending princes and Frederick I Barbarossa decided to partition Saxony in some dozens of territories of imperial immediacy, allotting each territory to that one of his allies, who had conquered them before from Henry the Lion and his remaining supporters. Otto I wielded his influence at the Diet. His and Siegfried's brother Bernhard, one of the most steadfast warriors against Henry the Lion, was provided with the later on so-called younger Duchy of Saxony (1180 - 1296), thus becoming Bernhard III, Duke of Saxony. In 1260, with effect from 1296 on, its later rulers split the younger Duchy into the Duchies of Saxe-Wittenberg (German: Herzogtum Sachsen-Wittenberg) and Saxe-Lauenburg (German: Herzogtum Sachsen-Lauenburg), the latter belonging in religious respect to the archdiocese of Bremen.

The Gelnhausen Diet (1180) confirmed Siegfried as Archbishop upgraded part of the diocesan territory to form the Prince-Archbishopric of Bremen of imperial immediacy. Thus the Prince-Archbishopric of Bremen became one of the successor states of the old Duchy of Saxony, holding only a small part of its former territory. Since the deposed Henry the Lion had entrenched in his last Saxon stronghold, the city of Stade, Otto I and Bernhard III militarily supported their brother Siegfried to de facto gain the power in all the Prince-Archbishopric.

== Siegfried as Prince-Archbishop of Bremen ==
After Alexander III had deposed Berthold (later Prince-Bishop of Metz), Siegfried did not lay down, but managed to get his election of 1168 confirmed in 1180. He ceded Ditmarsh, which supposed to belong to the Prince-Archbishopric of Bremen, to his brother Bernhard. In his new position of Duke of Saxony he held the Land of Hadeln around Otterndorf, south of the river Elbe right opposite of Ditmarsh on the north bank. Adolf III of Schauenburg, Count of Holstein, at enmity with the Ascanians, had taken de facto possession of Ditmarsh. So it was up to Bernhard to regain the territory, but he failed, he could only force Adolf to accept his overlordship in Ditmarsh.

In 1181, Siegfried waived to further levy fees from merchants for building ships. In the pertaining document he recognised the burghers of the city of Bremen as universitas civitas. He granted new privileges to the cities of Bremen and Stade. He participated in the foundations of the monastery in Osterholz (1182) and Heiligenrode (1180/1183; a part of today's Stuhr).

In 1182, Frederick I consigned Siegfried with the task to pick up the seven-year-old Princess Ingeborg, the sister of Canute VI of Denmark at the Danish court, and to escort her to her designate bridegroom Duke Frederick of Swabia, Frederick I's son. The Danish-imperial relations were difficult and therefore Canute granted his sister only a poor endowment. The marriage never materialised.

Siegfried continued and promoted the interior colonisation by settling wasteland and draining and diking marshes, as in Oberneuland (1181; a part of today's Bremen), Stuhr (1183), Osten and the marshes along the river Oste.

In 1183, some canons of Bremen's Cathedral formed a conspiracy against Siegfried, blaming him at Pope Lucius III to be a too secular clerk. The scholastic Henry of Bremen exonerated Siegfried, thus he stayed in office. Siegfried could win most of the diocesan clergy and Bremen's burghers through generous and pious donations.

In 1184, Siegfried died prematurely and was buried in a church in Bremen.

== See also ==
- Anhalt
- Archdiocese of Bremen
- House of Ascania

== Notes ==
Siegfried, Archbishop of Bremen House of Ascania Born: 1132 Died: 1184
Catholic Church titles
Preceded by Hartwig I, Count of Stade	Archbishop of Bremen; 1168 (he couldn't effectively take the See, because Guelphic partisans hindered him)	Succeeded by Baldwin I, Archbishop of Bremen
Regnal titles
Catholic Church titles
Preceded by Wilmar, bishop of Brandenburg	Prince-Bishop of Brandenburg as Siegfried I 1173–1179 (He resigned in favour of the Bremian See.)	Succeeded by Balderam, bishop of Brandenburg
Preceded by Berthold Archbishop of Bremen	Prince-Archbishop of Bremen; 1179/1180–1184 (in the beginning he couldn't effectively take the See, because Henry the Lion had occupied the Prince-Archbishopric)	Succeeded by Hartwig II, Prince-Archbishop of Bremen
