= Henry II of Anhalt-Aschersleben =

German prince

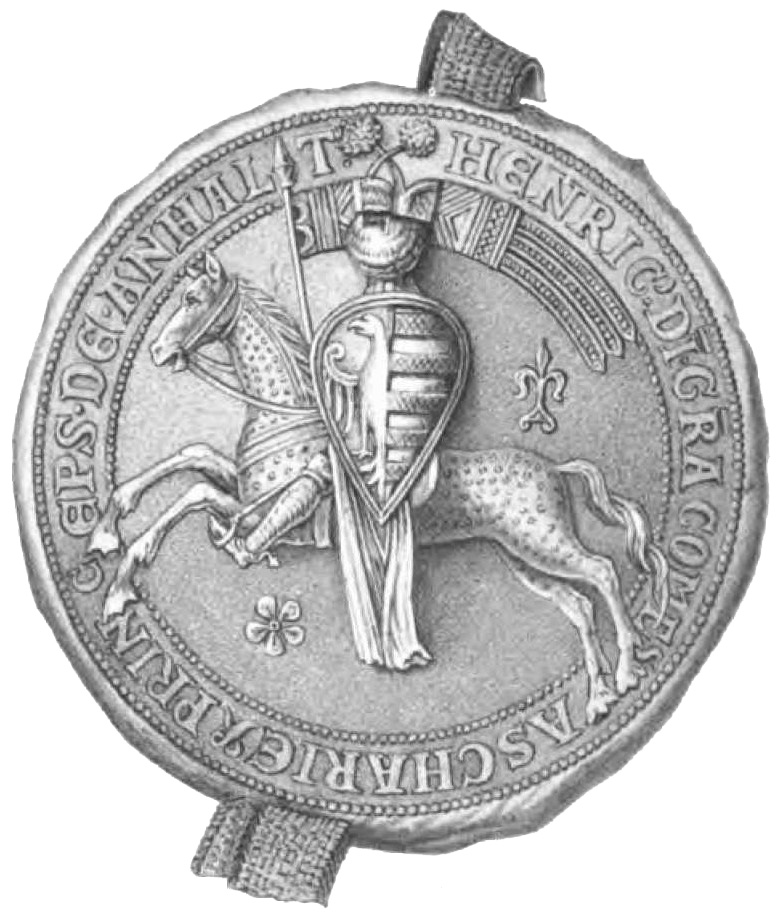
Seal of Henry II

Henry II, Prince of Anhalt-Aschersleben (1215 – 12 June 1266) was a German prince of the House of Ascania and ruler of the principality of Anhalt-Aschersleben.

He was the eldest son of Henry I, Count of Anhalt (who was raised to the rank of prince in 1218), by his wife Irmgard, daughter of Hermann I, Landgrave of Thuringia.

== Life ==
Henry was co-ruler of the principality of Anhalt with his father from 1244. After his father's death in 1252 the Anhalt state was divided between him and his brothers. Henry took over the old family areas of Aschersleben, Hecklingen, Ermsleben and Wörbzig.

Through his mother, Henry was related to the Landgraves of Thuringia; in 1247 he intervened in the War of the Thuringian Succession and spoke out in support of an alliance with Albert I, Duke of Brunswick-Lüneburg (his brother-in-law), who in return promised to give him some Thuringian lands. He was defeated and captured in battle near Besenstedt in 1263, but was released shortly after. He soon renewed his war against Thuringia. In 1265 he was captured again and forced to renounce completely his claims to lands in Thuringia.

In 1257, Henry supported King Alfonso X of Castile as German King and led military actions against the monasteries and archbishops of Magdeburg and bishops of Halberstadt as well as his brothers and cousins. In 1266 he raised Aschersleben to the rank of a city.

== Marriage and issue ==
In 1245 Henry married Matilda (d. Gernrode?, 25 October / 1 December? 1297), daughter of Otto the Child, Duke of Brunswick-Lüneburg, and Matilda of Brandenburg and great-granddaughter of Otto I of Brandenburg, older brother of Bernhard of Anhalt, Henry's grandfather. They had two sons:

1. Otto I, Prince of Anhalt-Aschersleben (d. 25 June 1304).
2. Henry III, Prince of Anhalt-Aschersleben (d. 9 November 1307).

On Henry's death his sons were still minors and his widow Matilda assumed the regency of the principality until 1270, when they reached adulthood. Shortly after, Matilda took the veil and became Abbess of Gernrode for almost twenty years, from 1275 to 1296.

Preceded by Henry I	Prince of Anhalt-Aschersleben; 1252–1266	Succeeded by Otto I and Henry III
