= Henry I of Anhalt =

First Prince of Anhalt

Henry I
- Prince of Anhalt
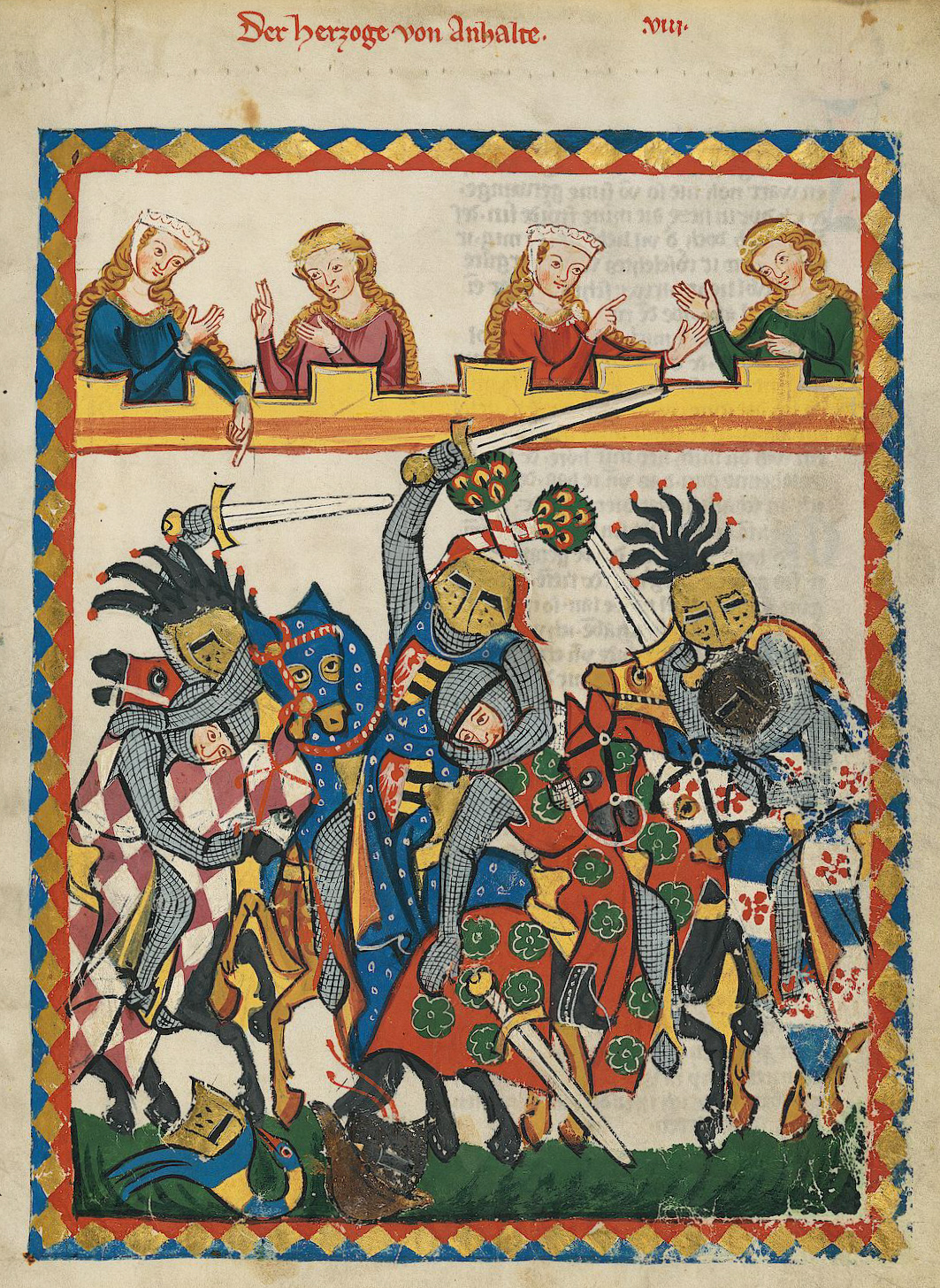
- Portrait in the Codex Manesse, 14th century
- Born: c. 1170
- Died: 1252
- Buried: Ballenstedt
- Noble family: House of Ascania
- Spouse: Irmgard of Thuringia
- Issue: Henry II, Prince of Anhalt-Aschersleben; Bernhard I, Prince of Anhalt-Bernburg; Siegfried I, Prince of Anhalt-Zerbst
- Father: Bernhard, Count of Anhalt
- Mother: Judith (Jutta) of Poland

Henry I (c. 1170 – 1252), a member of the House of Ascania, was Count of Anhalt from 1212 and the first ruling Anhalt prince from 1218 until his death.

== Life ==
He was the oldest son of Count Bernhard of Anhalt probably by his first wife Judith (or Jutta) of Poland, a daughter of Mieszko III the Old. Bernhard was enfeoffed with the Duchy of Saxony by Emperor Frederick Barbarossa after the deposition of the Welf duke Henry the Lion in 1180. After his death in 1212, his surviving sons divided his lands according to the laws of the House of Ascania: Henry received the old Ascanian allodial possessions in the Saxon Schwabengau around Ballenstedt, where he established the Principality of Anhalt; while his younger brother Albert inherited the Saxon ducal title and retained several unconnected Eastphalian estates around the towns of Wittenberg and Belzig (later Saxe-Wittenberg) as well as the northern lordship of Lauenburg.

Henry initially was a loyal supporter of the Hohenstaufen heir Frederick II, though later he temporarily switched sides to his Welf rival, Emperor Otto IV, was at feud with the Archbishops of Magdeburg, and campaigned the estates of Nienburg Abbey. From about 1215, he began to style himself "prince" (princeps, German: Fürst), and by Otto's death in 1218 was officially elevated to that rank attending the Hoftag diets of Emperor Frederick II. From 1220 Henry acted as a guardian for the minor sons of his Ascanian cousin, the late Margrave Albert II of Brandenburg, rivalling with both the Magdeburg archbishop Albert I of Käfernburg and his brother, Duke Albert of Saxony.

Partition of Anhalt among the sons of Henry I

Henry backed Emperor Frederick II during the rebellion of his son Henry (VII) in 1234 as well as on his Italian campaigns against the Lombard League, participating in the 1238 Siege of Brescia. Back in Germany, he became involved in the conflict between the Magdeburg archbishop Wilbrand von Käfernburg with his Ascanian cousins, the Margraves of Brandenburg, whereby the Nienburg estates were devastated by the troops of Margrave Otto III in 1242. Both sides reconciled in 1245, mediated by Duke Otto I of Brunswick who married his daughter Matilda, a niece of the Brandenburg margraves, off to Prince Henry's eldest son, Henry II.

Before his death, about 1245, Henry retired and divided the Anhalt principality between his sons: Henry II inherited Aschersleben, Bernhard received Bernburg, and Siegfried took Zerbst. His youngest surviving sons, Hermann and Magnus, were ordained priests. The House of Ascania ruled the Duchy of Anhalt until 1918.

== Literary patron and poet ==
Henry's most famous ministerialis (bondsman) was Eike von Repgow, a Saxon noble from Reppichau, who compiled the Sachsenspiegel, the most important legal code of the German Middle Ages. The prince also was a renowned Minnesänger. At the beginning of the 14th century, five of his Minnelieder (love songs) were copied into the Codex Manesse, an exceptionally beautiful collection. In this source, he is erroneously referred to as "Duke" (Herzog).

== Marriage and issue ==
About the year 1211 Henry married Irmgard (c. 1197 – c. 1244), daughter of the Ludovingian landgrave Hermann I of Thuringia and a second cousin of the Hohenstaufen emperor Frederick II through her paternal grandmother Judith of Swabia. They had eleven children:

1. Henry II, Prince of Anhalt-Aschersleben (born 1215 – died 12 June 1266)
2. Judith (died after 14 May 1277), married by 10 March 1233 to Lord Nicholas I of Werle
3. Sophie (died 23 November 1272), first married to Duke Otto I of Merania, secondly to Count Siegfried of Regenstein, and thirdly to Otto of Hadmersleben
4. Bernhard I, Prince of Anhalt-Bernburg (born c. 1218 – died 1287)
5. Albert (died c. 1245), a Franciscan friar
6. Hermann (died 1289), a canon in Halberstadt
7. Magnus (died after 18 June 1264), a canon in Magdeburg
8. Otto (died after 19 July 1246), a canon in Magdeburg
9. Siegfried I, Prince of Anhalt-Zerbst (born c. 1230 – died Köthen, 25 March 1298)
10. Hedwig (died 21 December 1259), married on 8 May 1242 to Duke Boleslaw II of Silesia and Liegnitz-Glogau
11. Gertrud (died 1275), Abbess of Gernrode (1260–1275).

== Ancestors ==
Ancestors of Henry I of Anhalt

8. Otto, Count of Ballenstedt
4. Albert the Bear
9. Eilika of Saxony
2. Bernhard, Count of Anhalt
10. Herman I, Count of Winzenburg
5. Sophie of Winzenburg
11. A Countess of Everstein
1. Henry I, Prince of Anhalt
12. Bolesław III Wrymouth
6. Mieszko III the Old
13. Salomea of Berg
3. Judith (Jutta) of Poland
14. Béla II of Hungary
7. Elizabeth of Hungary
15. Helena of Serbia

Henry I of Anhalt House of Ascania Born: c. 1170 Died: 1252
Regnal titles
Preceded by Bernhard	Count of Anhalt; 1212–1218	County elevated to principality
Anhalt elevated to principality	Prince of Anhalt; 1218–1252	Succeeded by Henry II as Prince of Anhalt-Aschersleben
Anhalt elevated to principality	Prince of Anhalt; 1218–1252	Succeeded by Bernhard I as Prince of Anhalt-Bernburg
Anhalt elevated to principality	Prince of Anhalt; 1218–1252	Succeeded by Siegfried I as Prince of Anhalt-Zerbst
