= Otto II of Anhalt-Aschersleben =

German prince

Otto II
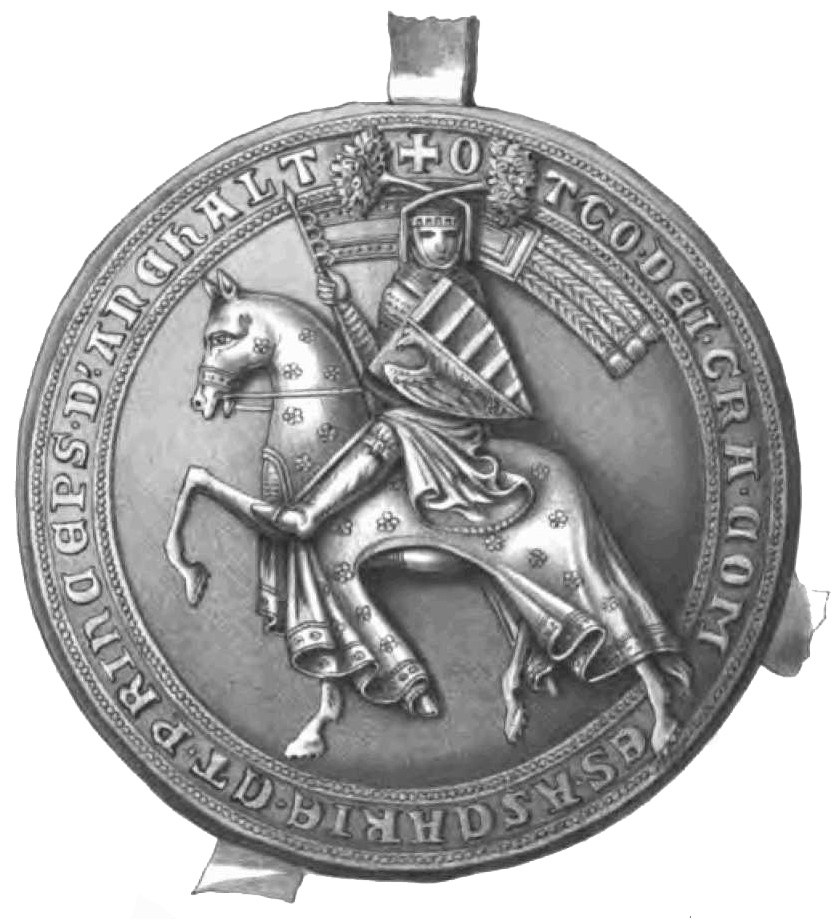
- Seal of Otto II

Prince of Anhalt-Aschersleben
- Reign: 1304—1315
- Predecessor: Otto I
- Successor: Title extinct
- Died: 24 July 1315
- Spouse: Elisabeth Clem (m. 1309)
- Issue: Princess Katharina; Princess Elisabeth
- House: Ascania
- Father: Otto I, Prince of Anhalt-Aschersleben
- Mother: Hedwig of Breslau

Otto II, Prince of Anhalt-Aschersleben (died 24 July 1315) was a German prince of the House of Ascania and the last ruler of the principality of Anhalt-Aschersleben.

He was the last child and only son of Otto I, Prince of Anhalt-Aschersleben, by his wife Hedwig, daughter of Henry III the White, Duke of Breslau.

== Life ==
After the death of his father in 1304, Otto inherited his principality of Anhalt-Aschersleben.

Otto participated in the political feuds typical of his era. In 1307 he supported the House of Wettin. After years of maintaining close ties with his cousin Waldemar, Margrave of Brandenburg-Stendal, Otto broke with him and became a vassal of King Eric VI of Denmark in 1315. He died shortly after; the last male of his family, the line of Anhalt-Aschersleben became extinct upon his death.

The Bishopric of Halberstadt took over his principality and lands (including Aschersleben) as payment for debt after his death. The presiding Anhalt prince at this time, Bernhard II of Anhalt-Bernburg, recognized the validity of the bishop's claim to this territory and the transfer was agreed upon in a contract signed in December 1316. The rights to the Principality of Anhalt-Aschersleben were disputed and argued over for centuries. In 1648, the prince/electors of Brandenburg took over the Bishopric of Halberstadt and all its possessions, including all of the land and rights once possessed by Prince Otto II.

== Marriage and issue ==
On 24 August 1309, Otto married Elisabeth (d. aft. 2 May 1347), the only daughter of Frederick Clem, the youngest son of Henry III, Margrave of Meissen. They had two daughters:

1. Katharina (d. bef. 15 April 1369), heiress of the Allodial, married in 1328 to Count Hermann VI of Orlamünde.
2. Elisabeth (d. young ca. 1317/1319).

Preceded by Otto I	Prince of Anhalt-Aschersleben; 1304–1315	Succeeded by Annexed by the Bishopric of Halberstadt
