= Henry III of Anhalt-Aschersleben =

German prince

Henry III, Prince of Anhalt-Aschersleben (died 9 November 1307) was a German prince of the House of Ascania and ruler of the principality of Anhalt-Aschersleben.

He was the youngest son of Henry II, Prince of Anhalt-Aschersleben, by his wife Matilda, daughter of Otto the Child, Duke of Brunswick-Lüneburg.

== Life ==
After the death of his father in 1266, Henry and his older brother Otto inherited the principality of Anhalt-Aschersleben; but because they were still underage, their mother Matilda acted as regent until they were proclaimed adults in 1270.

Destined for the church at a very young age, he became a canon at Magdeburg in 1274 and provost of St. Blasius at Brunswick in 1281.

Henry co-ruled with his brother until 1283, when he renounced all his rights over Aschersleben in Otto's favor.

In 1304 Henry was elected Archbishop of Magdeburg and was formally installed in 1306. He died one year later.

Preceded by Henry II	Prince of Anhalt-Aschersleben with Otto I 1266–1283	Succeeded by Otto I
Preceded by Burkhard II von Blankenburg	Archbishop of Magdeburg; 1305–1307	Succeeded by Burkhard III von Mansfeld-Schrapglau
