= Henry of Bremen =

Henry of Bremen was a 13th-century Franciscan of German origin. He was named Archbishop of Gniezno by Pope Martin IV on 23 December 1281, although he had not previously held any church office, but declined to serve. His repudiation of the appointment opened the way for the appointment of Jakub Świnka in 1283.
