= Otto I of Anhalt-Aschersleben =

German prince

Otto I
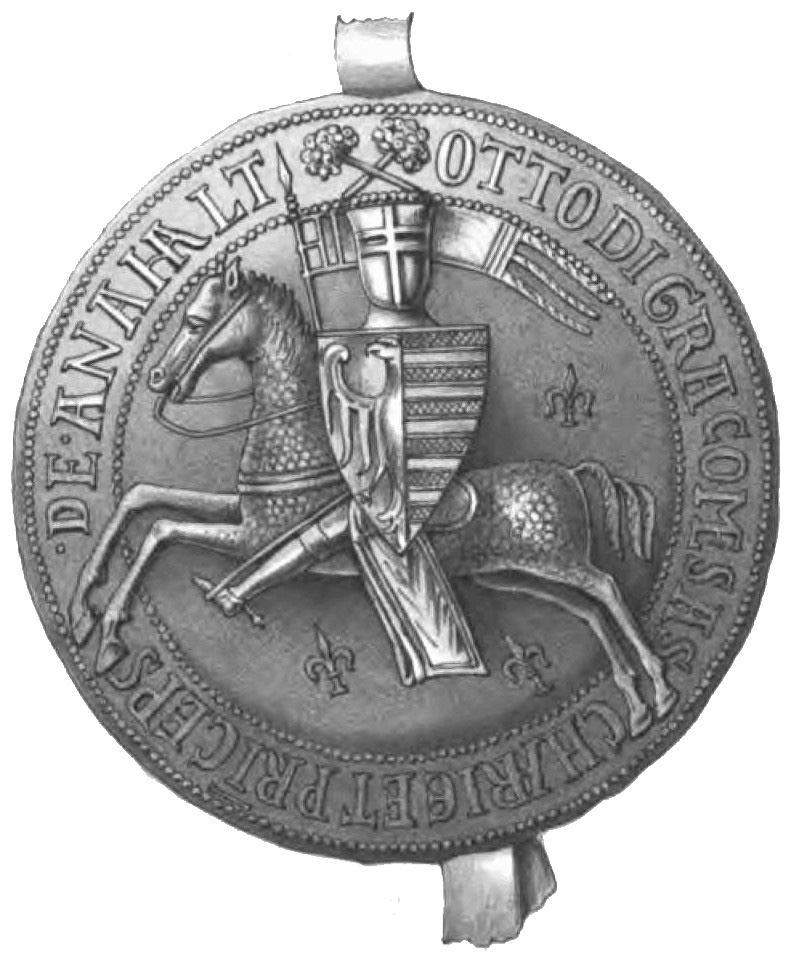
- Seal of Otto I

Prince of Anhalt-Aschersleben
- Reign: 1266–1304
- Predecessor: Henry II
- Successor: Otto II
- Died: 25 June 1304
- Spouse: Hedwig of Breslau (m. 1283)
- Issue: Otto II, Prince of Anhalt-Aschersleben; Princess Sophie; Princess Elisabeth
- House: Ascania
- Father: Henry II, Prince of Anhalt-Aschersleben
- Mother: Matilda of Brunswick-Lüneburg

Otto I, Prince of Anhalt-Aschersleben (died 25 June 1304) was a German prince of the House of Ascania and ruler of the principality of Anhalt-Aschersleben.

He was the eldest son of Henry II, Prince of Anhalt-Aschersleben, by his wife Matilda, daughter of Otto the Child, Duke of Brunswick-Lüneburg. Otto was named after his maternal grandfather.

== Life ==
After the death of his father in 1266, Otto and his younger brother Henry inherited the principality of Anhalt-Aschersleben as co-rulers; but because they were still underage, their mother Matilda assumed the regency of Aschersleben until 1270, when both brothers were declared adults.

Otto continued to rule jointly with his brother until 1283, when Henry (already a provost) renounced his rights. From that time, Otto ruled alone until his own death.

== Marriage and issue ==
In 1283 Otto married Hedwig (b. ca. 1256 - d. aft. 14 December 1300), daughter of Henry III the White, Duke of Wrocław, and widow of Henry, Lord of Pleissnerland, eldest son of Albert II, Margrave of Meissen. They had three children:

1. Otto II, Prince of Anhalt-Aschersleben (d. 24 July 1315).
2. Sophie, married bef. 1308 to Count Ulrich III of Regenstein-Heimburg.
3. Elisabeth, married ca. 1300 to Count Frederick of Beichlingen-Rotenburg.

Preceded by Henry II	Prince of Anhalt-Aschersleben with Henry III until 1283; 1266–1304	Succeeded by Otto II
