= Principality of Anhalt-Aschersleben =

Principality of Anhalt-Aschersleben Fürstentum Anhalt-Aschersleben
- 1252–1315
- Flag Coat of arms

- Map of Anhalt in 1259. Anhalt-Aschersleben is in brown.
- Status: Principality
- Capital: Aschersleben
- Common languages: East Central German
- Prince
  - 1252–67: Henry II
  - 1267–1304: Otto I
  - 1267–83: (with Henry III)
  - 1304–15: Otto II
- Historical era: Middle Ages
  - Partitioned from Anhalt: 1252
  - Seized by Halberstadt: 1315
  - Passed to Brandenburg on secularisation of bishopric: 1648
Preceded by	Succeeded by
Principality of Anhalt	Bishopric of Halberstadt

Anhalt-Aschersleben was a short-lived principality of the Holy Roman Empire ruled by the House of Ascania with its residence at Aschersleben in present-day Saxony-Anhalt. It emerged as a subdivision from the Principality of Anhalt from 1252 to 1315.

== History ==
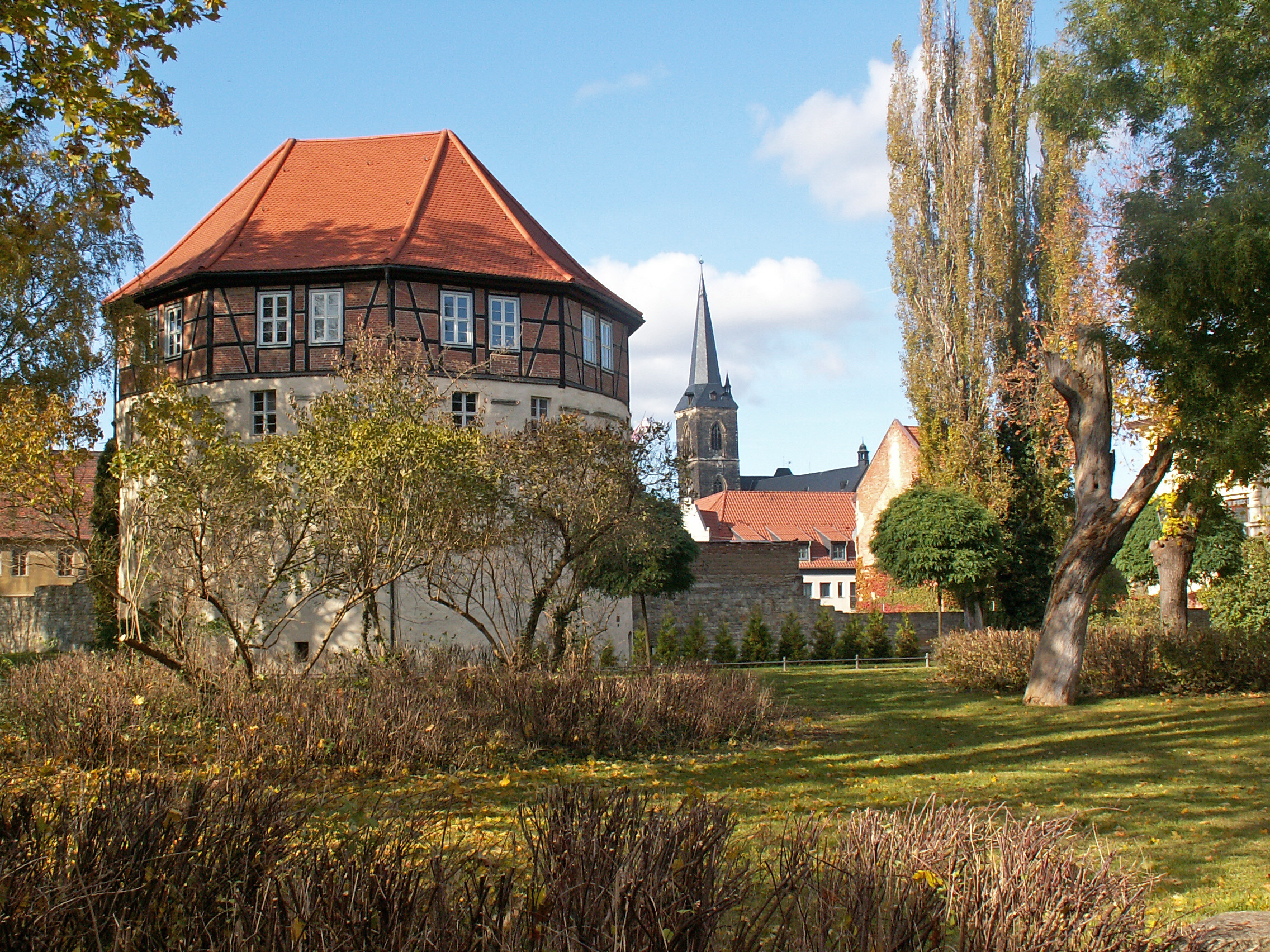
Aschersleben

It was created when the Anhalt territory was divided among the sons of Prince Henry I into the Principalities of Anhalt-Aschersleben, Anhalt-Bernburg and Anhalt-Zerbst in 1252. Prince Henry II the Fat, the eldest son of Henry I, had been co-ruler of his father since 1244. In the course of the partition he chose the Anhalt ancestral homeland north of the Harz mountain range around the Ascanian residence of Aschersleben (Ascharia), which he granted town privileges in 1266.

When in 1315 Henry's grandson Otto II died without male heirs, the principality — including the capital of Aschersleben — was seized as a fief by his cousin and creditor Bishop Albert of Halberstadt. Though Prince Bernhard II of Anhalt-Bernburg one year later acknowledged the feudal tenure of Halberstadt, Aschersleben was the cause for several conflicts between his successors and the Halberstadt bishops. Nevertheless, it remained part of the diocese, which in 1648 was secularized into the Principality of Halberstadt, and its sovereign possessions, including the rights to Anhalt-Aschersleben, were given to Brandenburg-Prussia.

== Princes of Anhalt-Aschersleben 1252–1315 ==
- 1252–1266 Henry II
- 1266–1304 Otto I
  - 1266–1283 Henry III, brother and co-regent
- 1304–1315 Otto II
