= Sophie of Winzenburg =

First Margravine of Brandenburg

- Born: 1105; Winzenburg, near Hanover
- Died: 6 or 7 July 1160; Brandenburg an der Havel
- Buried: Ballenstedt
- Noble family: House of Frombach
- Spouse: Albert the Bear
- Issue: Otto I, Margrave of Brandenburg; Hermann I, Count of Orlamünde; Siegfried, Prince-Archbishop of Bremen; Heinrich; Albert; Dietrich; Bernhard, Count of Anhalt; Hedwig, Margravine of Meissen daughter Adelheid; Gertrude, Duchess of Moravia; Sybille, Abbess of Quedlinburg; Eilika
- Father: Herman I, Count of Winzenburg
- Mother: Countess of Everstein

Sophie of Winzenburg (1105 in Winzenburg, near Hanover – 6 or 7 July 1160 in Brandenburg an der Havel) was the first Margravine of Brandenburg.

== Life ==
Sophie was a daughter of Count Herman I of Winzenburg and his first wife, who was a Countess of Everstein. She donated an oxgang of farmland near Wellen to the monastery at Leitzkau and later another oxgang near Wolmirsleben. In 1158, she accompanied her husband on a pilgrimage to the Holy Land.

== Death ==
Her sister, Beatrix, was abbess of Quedlinburg Abbey. Sophie and Beatrix both died in 1160. Some sources suggest that Sophie died on 25 March, other name 6 or 7 July. She was buried in the church of the monastery in Ballenstedt.

== Criticism ==
The present state of research is that the identity of her father has not been conclusively proven. She may have belonged to another noble house in which the name Sophie was used.

== Image ==
Seven hundred years after her death, a bracteate depicting Sophie and her husband was found in Aschersleben. Her portrait is stylized, as was usual in that period. The fact that Albert depicted his wife beside him on coins is a sign of his extraordinary love for Sophie.

== Marriage and issue ==
In 1125, she married Albert the Bear. She had a dozen children with him. Of these children, Bernhard lived the longest, viz. until 1212.

1. Otto I, Margrave of Brandenburg (1126/1128 – 7 March 1184)
2. Count Herman I of Orlamünde (died 1176)
3. Siegfried (died 24 October 1184), Bishop of Brandenburg from 1173 to 1180, Prince-Archbishop of Bremen, the first ranked prince, from 1180 to 1184
4. Heinrich (died 1185), a canon in Magdeburg
5. Count Adalbert of Ballenstedt (died after 6 December 1172)
6. Count Dietrich of Werben (died after 5 September 1183)
7. Count Bernhard of Anhalt (1140 – 9 February 1212), Count of Anhalt, and from 1180 also Duke of Saxony as Bernard III
8. Hedwig (d. 1203), married to Otto II, Margrave of Meissen
9. Daughter, married c. 1152 to Vladislav of Olomouc, the eldest son of Soběslav I, Duke of Bohemia
10. Adelheid (died 1162), a nun in Lamspringe
11. Gertrude, married in 1155 to Duke Děpold I of Jamnitz
12. Sybille (died c. 1170), Abbess of Quedlinburg
13. Eilika
