= Christian I of Anhalt-Bernburg =

German prince (1568–1630)

Christian I
- Prince of Anhalt-Bernburg
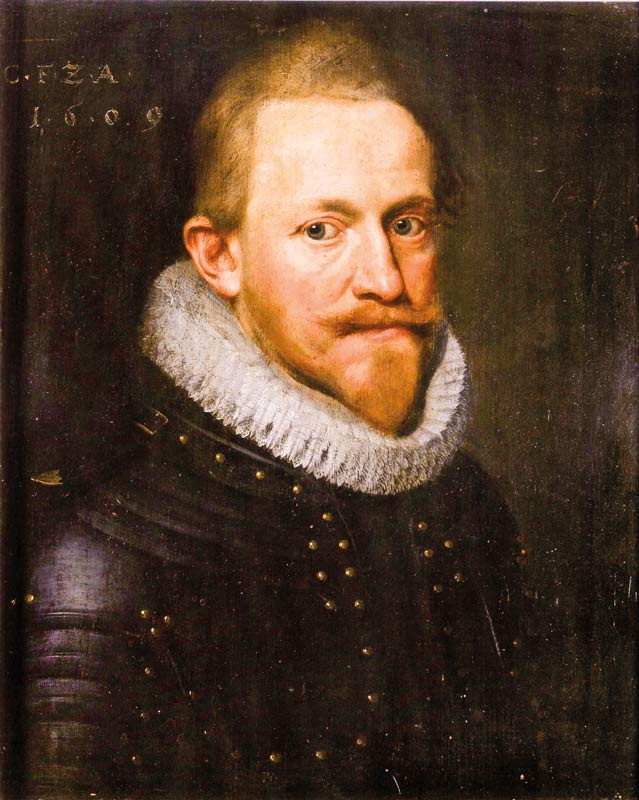
- Christian of Anhalt, 1609
- Born: 11 May 1568; Bernburg
- Died: 17 April 1630 (aged 61); Bernburg
- Spouse: Anna of Bentheim-Tecklenburg
- Issue Detail: Christian II, Prince of Anhalt-Bernburg; Eleonore Marie; Frederick, Prince of Anhalt(-Bernburg)-Harzgerode
- House: Ascania
- Father: Joachim Ernest, Prince of Anhalt
- Mother: Agnes of Barby-Mühlingen

Christian I, Prince of Anhalt-Bernburg, also known as Christian of Anhalt, (11 May 1568 – 17 April 1630) was a German prince of the House of Ascania. He was ruling prince of Anhalt and, from 1603, ruling prince of the revived principality of Anhalt-Bernburg. From 1595 he was governor of Upper Palatinate, and soon became the advisor-in-chief of Frederick IV, Elector Palatine.

== Life ==
Christian was the second son of Joachim Ernest, Prince of Anhalt, by his first wife Agnes, daughter of Wolfgang I, Count of Barby-Mühlingen. Born in Bernburg, Christian was trained from 1570 in Dessau by Caspar Gottschalk in Latin, Italian, and French. Still a child, he participated in diplomatic missions, among other places, to Constantinople; thus prepared, he developed into an ambitious, urbane diplomat.

In the early months of 1586 he went to Dresden and remained there several years as the closest friend of his namesake, Christian I, Elector of Saxony, whose Calvinist sympathies he shared. It is known that he suffered from alcoholic excesses during his stay at the electoral court.

Taking possession of his family lands in December of the same year (1586), Christian remained a devoted Calvinist and later served as advisor to Frederick IV, Elector Palatine. In 1591 he led the Palatine army in aid of the French king Henry IV. When a dispute for the possession of the bishopric of Strasbourg—the so-called Bishops' War—erupted in 1592, he supported Brandenburg against Lorraine. In 1595 he was appointed Governor of the Upper Palatinate by Frederick IV and settled in the Bavarian town of Amberg.

In 1603 the principality of Anhalt was formally divided between Christian and his surviving brothers. He received Bernburg, and with this settlement revived the old principality of the same name that had been extinct since 1468.

As a diplomat, Christian played an important role in the formation of the Protestant Union in 1608. With the death of the Elector Frederick IV, Christian served his son, Frederick V, and was appointed to command the Protestant forces to defend Bohemia against Holy Roman Emperor Ferdinand II and his allies when the Bohemian nobles elected Frederick as their king in 1619. The same year, Christian was accepted in the Fruitbearing Society. When Bohemian forces were defeated at the Battle of White Mountain in 1620, Christian advised Frederick against making a stand in Prague. In 1621, in response to his affiliation with the Palatines, Christian was put under an imperial ban that effectively made him an outlaw within the Holy Roman Empire and stripped him of his lands.

Christian fled first to Sweden, and then became a guest of King Christian IV at his court in Denmark-Norway. He appealed to Emperor Ferdinand for mercy in 1624 and was allowed to return to his principality, where he died six years later.

== Marriage and issue ==
In Lohrbach on 2 July 1595 Christian married Anna of Bentheim-Tecklenburg (b. Bentheim, 4 January 1579 – d. Bernburg, 9 December 1624), daughter of Arnold III, Count of Bentheim-Steinfurt-Tecklenburg-Limburg. They had sixteen children:

1. Frederick Christian (b. and d. Amberg, 2 May 1596).
2. Amalie Juliane (b. Amberg, 10 September 1597 – d. Neinburg, Hannover, 11 August 1605).
3. Christian II, Prince of Anhalt-Bernburg (b. Amberg, 11 August 1599 – d. Bernburg, 22 September 1656).
4. Eleonore Marie (b. Amberg, 7 August 1600 – d. Strelitz, 17 July 1657), married on 7 May 1626 to John Albert II, Duke of Mecklenburg-Güstrow.
5. A daughter (b. and d. Amberg, May? 1601).
6. Sibylle Elisabeth (b. Amberg, 10 February 1602 – d. Strelitz, 15 August 1648).
7. Anna Magdalene (b. Amberg, 8 March 1603 – d. 30 October 1611).
8. Anna Sophie (b. Amberg, 10 June 1604 – d. Bernburg, 1 September 1640).
9. Louise Amalie (b. Amberg, 14 January 1606 – d. Bernburg, 17 October 1635).
10. Ernest (b. Amberg, 19 May 1608 – d. Naumburg, 3 December 1632), colonel of a cavalry regiment in Saxon service, fatally wounded at the Battle of Lützen (1632).
11. Amöena Juliane (b. Amberg, 13 November 1609 – d. Bernburg, 31 July 1628).
12. Agnes Magdalene (b. Amberg, 8 October 1612 – d. Wildungen, 17 July 1629).
13. Frederick, Prince of Anhalt(-Bernburg)-Harzgerode (b. Ensdorf, 16 November 1613 – d. Plötzkau, 30 June 1670).
14. Sophie Margarete (b. Amberg, 16 September 1615 – d. Dessau, 27 December 1673), married on 14 July 1651 to John Casimir, Prince of Anhalt-Dessau.
15. Dorothea Matilde (b. Amberg, 11 August 1617 – d. Bernburg, 7 May 1656).
16. Frederick Louis (b. Amberg, 17 August 1619 – d. Harzgerode, 29 January 1621).

== Footnotes ==
Christian I of Anhalt-Bernburg House of Ascania Born: 11 May 1568 Died: 17 April 1630
Preceded by Joachim Ernest	Prince of Anhalt with John George I, Bernhard (until 1596), Augustus, Rudolph, John Ernest (until 1601) and Louis; 1586–1603	Succeeded by Principality partitioned in Anhalt-Dessau, Anhalt-Bernburg, Anhalt-Plötzkau, Anhalt-Zerbst and Anhalt-Köthen
Preceded by Principality (re-)created	Prince of Anhalt-Bernburg; 1603–1630	Succeeded by Christian II
