= Fuhne =

River in Germany

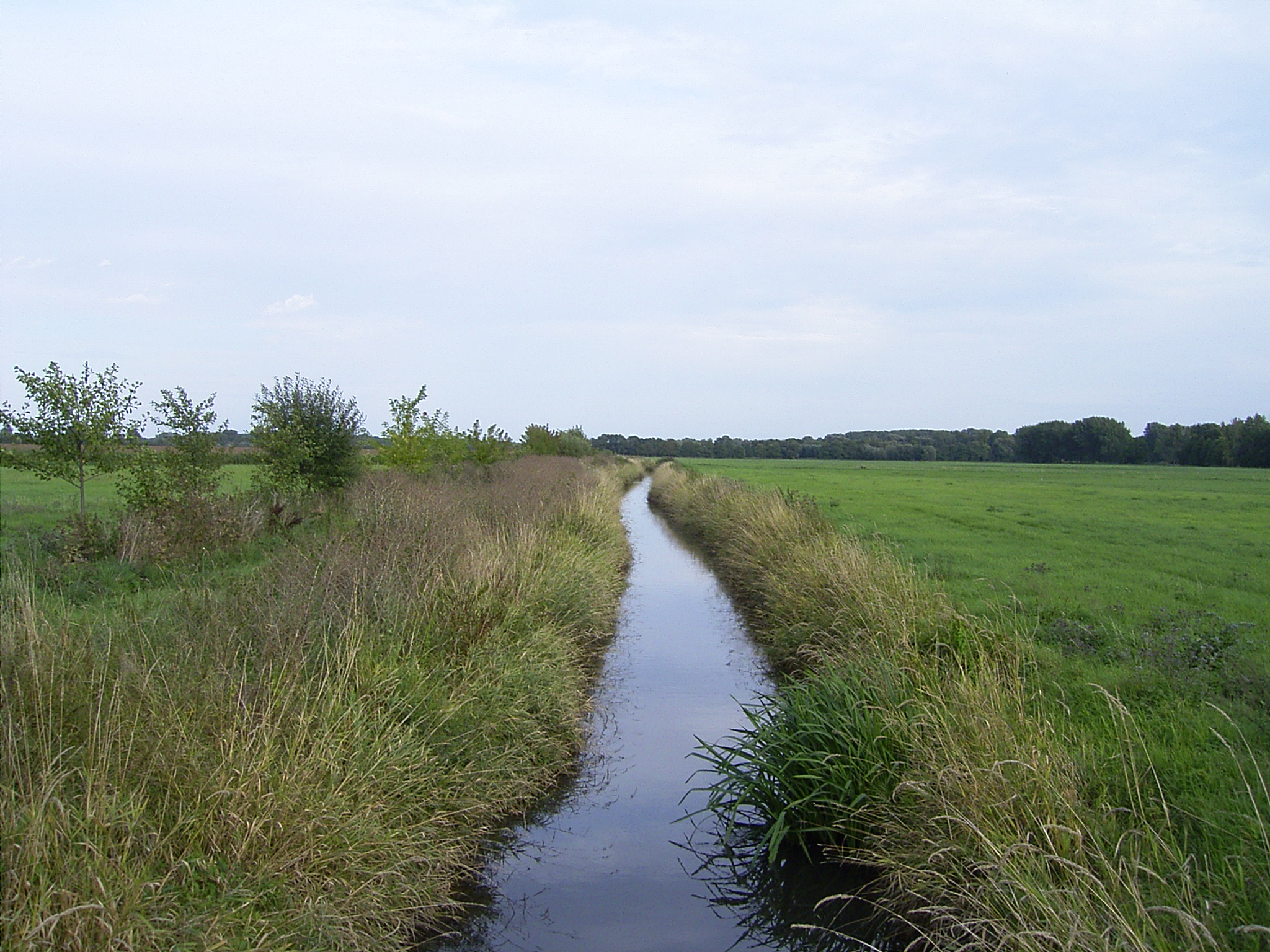

Location
- Country: Germany
- States: Saxony-Anhalt

Physical characteristics
- Mouth
  - location: Saale
  - coordinates: 51.7993°N 11.7638°E

Basin features
- Progression: Saale→ Elbe→ North Sea

Fuhne (German pronunciation: [ˈfuːnə]) is a river of Saxony-Anhalt, Germany. It flows into the Saale near Bernburg.

== See also ==
- List of rivers of Saxony-Anhalt
