= Bernhard, Count of Anhalt =

11th/12th-century German nobleman

Bernhard
- Count of Anhalt
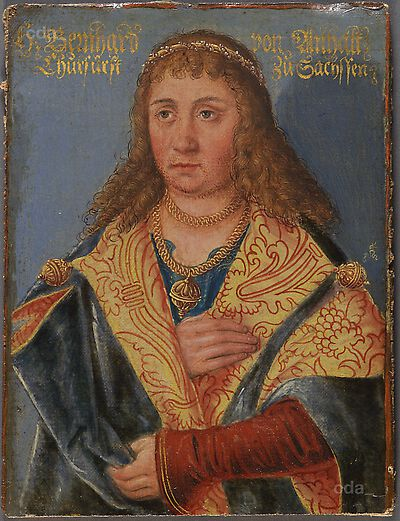
- Portrait c. 1578–1580

Duke of Saxony
- Reign: 1180–1212
- Predecessor: Henry the Lion
- Successor: Albert I
- Born: c. 1140
- Died: 2 February 1212; Ballenstedt
- Noble family: House of Ascania
- Spouses: Judith of Greater Poland; Sophia of Thuringia
- Issue: Henry I, Count of Anhalt; Albert I, Duke of Saxony; Sophia of Saxony
- Father: Albert the Bear
- Mother: Sophie of Winzenburg

Bernhard (c. 1140– 2 February 1212), a member of the House of Ascania, was Count of Anhalt and Ballenstedt, and Lord of Bernburg through his paternal inheritance. From 1180 he was also Duke of Saxony (as Bernhard III or Bernhard I).

== Life ==
=== Early years ===
Bernhard was the youngest of the seven sons of Albert the Bear, Duke of Saxony from 1138 to 1142 and first Margrave of Brandenburg from 1157, by his wife Sophie of Winzenburg. In 1157 he was present together with his father and brothers at the funeral of the Wettin margrave Conrad of Meissen. Two years later, Bernhard accompanied Emperor Frederick Barbarossa to Italy with his brother Margrave Otto I of Brandenburg.

=== Count of Anhalt ===
After the death of his father in 1170, Bernhard inherited the estates around Ascaria (Aschersleben) in the Saxon Schwabengau and the adjacent Gau Serimunt between the Saale, Mulde and Elbe rivers in the former Saxon Eastern March. These territories eventually emerged as the nucleus of the Ascanian Principality of Anhalt, named after Anhalt Castle near Harzgerode.

When his elder brother Albert died without male issue in 1172, Bernhard also inherited his County of Ballenstedt. In the same year he solicited the Emperor Frederick Barbarossa in the Imperial Diet of Goslar for possession of Plötzkau, which passed to him in 1173. However, a dispute over the rule of the Plötzkau lordship sparked a fierce conflict with the Welf duke Henry the Lion that led to the destruction of Aschersleben and Gröningen and nearly resulted in the destruction of Halberstadt. Bernhard nonetheless was able to confirm his possessions.

=== Fall of Henry the Lion ===
When Henry the Lion was outlawed by the Emperor in 1180, the Reichstag also dispossessed him of his fiefs (Würzburg and the Duchies of Bavaria and Saxony). In Gelnhausen on 13 April 1180, Bernhard was granted the eastern part of the Welf lands, including the Archbishopric of Bremen-Hamburg, which was passed on to his elder brother Siegfried, and the Duchy of Saxony. This latter award was without real value, however, since this duchy was a radically reduced territory consisting of three unconnected parcels of land along the river Elbe: (1) Hadeln around Otterndorf, (2) a parcel around Lauenburg upon Elbe and (3) a parcel around Wittenberg upon Elbe. Previously the duchy had been divided, so that Bernhard could only receive the region between Meissen and the Mark of Brandenburg as his formal possession. Besides these, he also received several small territories: the towns of Aken and Wittenberg and the Burgraviate of Magdeburg. The dignity Duke of Saxony, Angria and Westphalia was only an empty title. The rich lands of Engern and Westphalia, in addition to the ducal title of Highness, were conferred on the Archbishopric-Electorate of Cologne. The counts of Holstein were released from their homage to the Saxon dukes, the County of Stade was taken by the Archbishop of Bremen, Lübeck became an Imperial City, the Saxon Palatinate was bestowed on Count Hermann of Thuringia and, in addition, the Saxon bishops took back their fiefs. Bernhard was forced to support the Emperor in his renewed war against Henry the Lion in 1181. In spite of his defeat, Henry the Lion was able to preserve his allodial title, from which the Duchy of Brunswick and Lüneburg was later formed.

=== Ruling as Duke of Saxony ===
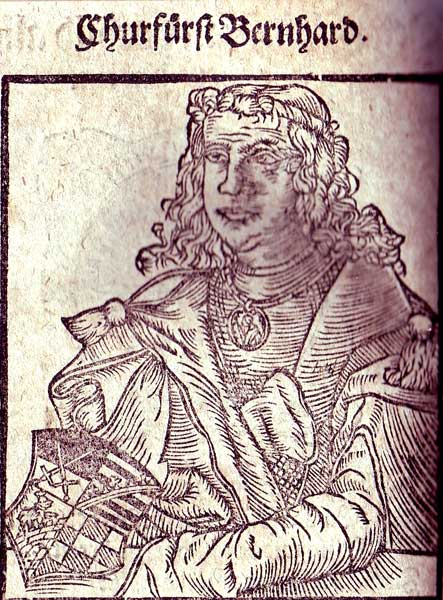
Woodcut by Balthasar Mencius (Menz), 1596, showing Bernhard holding his coat-of-arms. Inscription: Churfürst Bernhard (i.e. Prince-elector Bernhard)

In Nordalbingien and the areas between the Elbe and the Baltic Sea, Bernhard's vassals soon rebelled against him and gave their support to Henry the Lion. Bernhard tried to assert his claims, thanks to the support of his brothers Otto I of Brandenburg and Siegfried, Archbishop of Bremen. At first the vassals of Artlenburg swore an oath of fidelity. After them, the counts of Ratzeburg, Danneberg, Luckow and Schwerin also swore. However, the most powerful of these vassals, Count Adolf III of Holstein, would not accept Bernhard's lordship and became his adversary. Conflicts broke out around Dithmarschen, in western Holstein, but without success for Adolf.

After Adolf's defeat, Lauenburg (Polabenburg) on the lower Elbe, became the focal point for opposition to Bernhard's rule. Determined to eliminate the opposition against him in his lands, he levied high taxes on rebellious territories, which led to an attack against Lauenburg and its destruction in 1182, followed by the restoration of the fortress.

In 1183 another of Bernhard's brothers, Count Dietrich of Werben died without surviving male issue. His possessions fell mostly to Bernhard.

Warfare involving Henry the Lion also expanded to the Slavic countries. Henry Borwin I, the son of Pribislav, was a supporter of Henry the Lion like his father, and remained an opponent of Bernhard. His cousin Nicholas I, granted Burg Malchow by Henry the Lion in 1164, lost part of it due to his association with Bernhard. Borwin allied himself with Duke Bogislaw I of Pomerania and Nicholas with Jaromar I, Prince of Rügen, a faithful vassal of Denmark. But shortly after Bogislaw had to punish Borwin (in response to a secret order of the emperor) with the help of King Canute VI of Denmark for his refusal to render homage, by which his lands were split between the Elbe and Or to the Empire and Denmark. Borwin was taken into captivity by King Canute and was forced, like Nicholas, to accept his lands from the king as fiefs. After incursions of the Danes in Pomerania in 1184 and 1185, Bogislaw shared the same destiny.

With the success of the Danes, the Emperor in 1184 pressed for a political balance between Bernhard and his vassal. Count Adolf of Holstein kept the disputed regions, however he had to pay 700 marks to Bernhard and swear the oath of fidelity that he had earlier refused to do. Counts Bernhard of Ratzeburg and Gunzelin of Schwerin were also obliged to make payments. The destroyed Lauenburg had to be rebuilt.

However, after Henry's return in 1188 it came again to discussions with Bernhard, who finally lost the town of Bardowick.

As Duke of Saxony, Bernhard became at the same time Marshal of the Holy Roman Empire. He asserted this important post for the first time in 1190 at the coronation of Emperor Henry VI, but spoiled his good terms with the Emperor through his opposition to making the German crown hereditary in the House of Hohenstaufen. In 1198 he supported Philip of Swabia as Emperor. Philip was killed on 21 June 1208 by Otto of Wittelsbach at Altenburg in Bamberg. Thereupon a new imperial election was held in Halberstadt and (with Bernhard's vote included) Otto of Brunswick was elected on 22 September and crowned immediately in Frankfurt as Otto IV.

Otto IV, who meanwhile had fallen out with Pope Innocent III over Sicily, supported the reascension of Valdemar, the papally dismissed Prince-Archbishop of Bremen. So in 1211 Bernhard escorted his brother-in-law Valdemar into the city of Bremen, de facto regaining the see.

With his acquisition of Saxon estates, Bernhard moved his residence and court to Wittenberg. In 1260 (with effect as from 1296 on) his grandsons split the Duchy into the Duchies of Saxe-Wittenberg (German: Herzogtum Sachsen-Wittenberg) and Saxe-Lauenburg (German: Herzogtum Sachsen-Lauenburg), the latter holding the unconnected two northern territories. Wittenberg remained a residence of the House of Ascania until the extinction of this line in 1422. On his death, aged seventy-two, Bernhard was buried beside his father Albert and several of his brothers in the Church of the Benedictine monastery in Ballenstedt.

== Marriage and issue ==
Bernhard married, firstly, Judith (Jutta) (b. bef. 1154 – d. aft. 12 December 1201), a daughter of Mieszko III the Old of Poland. They had:

1. Henry I, Count of Anhalt (b. c. 1170 – d. 1252)
2. Sophia of Saxony (d. 16 July 1244), Abbess of Gernrode (1221–44)
3. Albert I, Duke of Saxony (b. c. 1175 – d. 7 October / 8 November? 1260)
4. Magnus (d. young)
5. Hedwig (c. 1175 – after 1206), in c. 1204 she became the second wife of Count Ulrich I of Wettin

He married, secondly, Sophia, daughter of Louis II, the Iron, Landgrave of Thuringia with issue:

1. John, Provost in Halberstadt (1256)

== Sources ==
- Loud, Graham A.; Schenk, Jochen, eds. (2017). The Origins of the German Principalities, 1100-1350: Essays by German Historians. Routledge.
- Lyon, Jonathan R. (2013). Princely Brothers and Sisters: The Sibling Bond in German Politics, 1100-1250. Cornell University Press.

Bernhard, Count of Anhalt House of Ascania Born: c. 1140 Died: 2 February 1212
Regnal titles
Preceded by Henry III	Duke of Saxony; 1180–1212	Succeeded by Albert I
Preceded by Albert the Bear	Count of Anhalt; 1170–1212	Succeeded by Henry I
