= Sophie Elisabeth of Anhalt-Dessau =

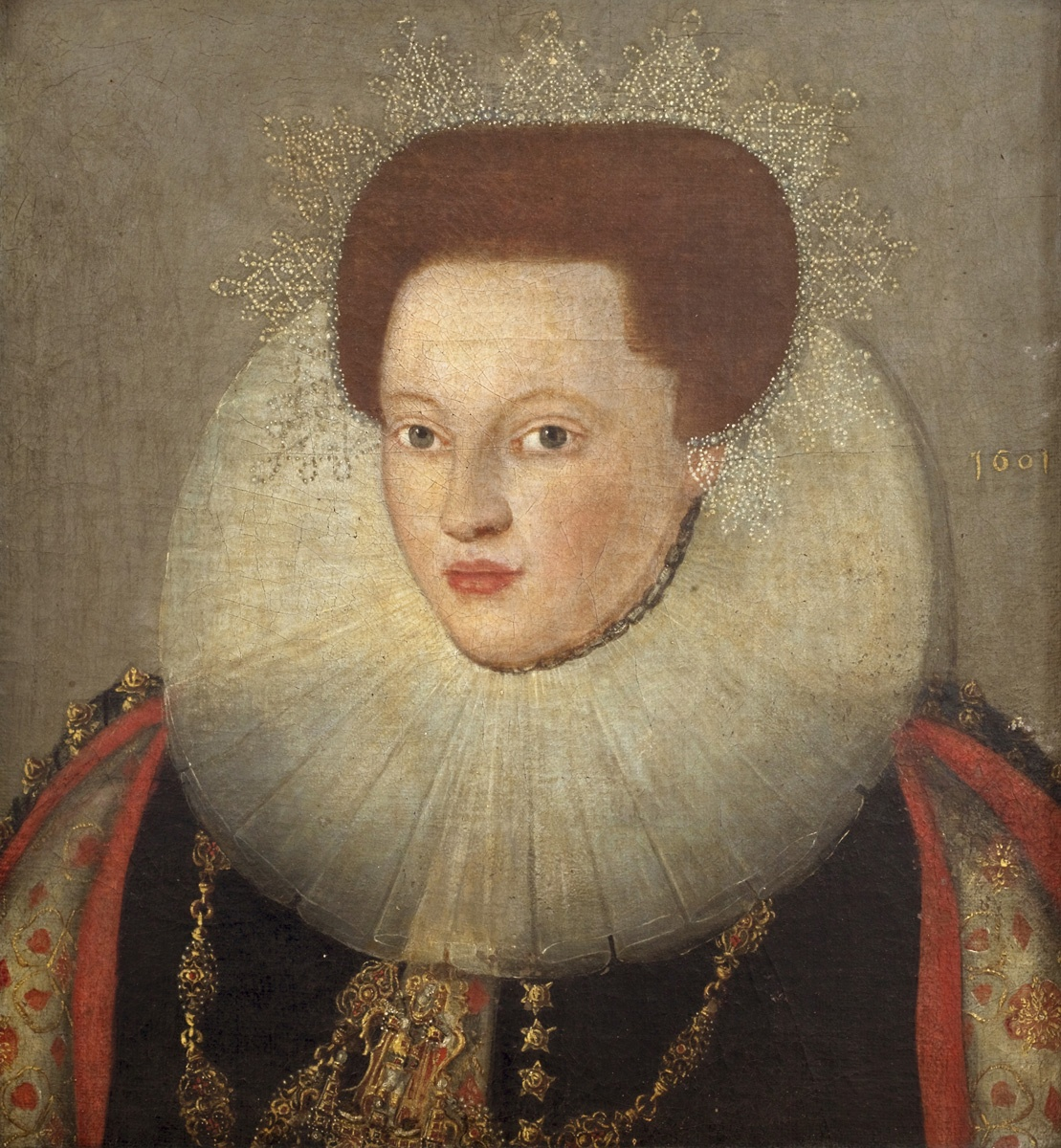
- Portrait of Sophie Elisabeth (after 1614)

Abbess of Gernrode
- Reign: 1593 – 1614
- Predecessor: Dorothea Maria of Anhalt
- Successor: None (Gernrode disestablished)

Duchess of Liegnitz
- Reign: 4 November 1614 – 9 February 1620
- Predecessor: Anna Maria of Anhalt
- Successor: Elisabeth Magdalena
- Born: 10 February 1589; Dessau
- Died: 9 February 1620 (aged 30); Liegnitz
- Spouse: George Rudolf of Liegnitz
- Dynasty: House of Ascania
- Father: John George I of Anhalt-Dessau
- Mother: Dorothea of Mansfeld-Arnstein

Sophie Elisabeth of Anhalt-Dessau (10 February 1589 – 9 February 1620) was a German princess of the House of Ascania. She was the last abbess of Gernrode (r.1593-1614). After leaving the abbey, Sophie Elisabeth married George Rudolf of Liegnitz and was duchess of Liegnitz until her death in 1620.

== Family ==
Sophie Elisabeth was a member of the House of Ascania. Her parents were John George I of Anhalt-Dessau and his first wife, Dorothea of Mansfeld-Arnstein (1561-1594), daughter of John Albert VI of Mansfeld-Arnstein. Sophie Elisabeth had four full siblings, and eleven half-siblings (from her father's second marriage to Dorothea of Simmern). These included John Casimir, Eleonore Dorothea, Sibylle Christine, George Aribert and Susanna Margarete.

== Abbess of Gernrode ==
From the age of four, Sophie Elisabeth was abbess of Gernrode. The abbey had been in decline for some time before Sophie Elisabeth's abbacy. In particular, since the fifteenth century members of Sophie Elisabeth's dynasty, the House of Anhalt (descended from the House of Ascania) had successively tried to incorporate the abbey into their own domains. By the time Sophie Elisabeth became abbess, the abbey's possessions covered only about two square miles. Between 1610 and 1614, members of the House of Anhalt incorporated these last remaining possessions of Gernrode into their own domains.

In 1614, Sophie Elisabeth left the abbey in order to marry. Her relatives, the princes of Anhalt, refused to appoint a new abbess and completed the incorporation of Gernrode into their territory. Sophie Elisabeth was thus the last abbess of Gernrode.

== Marriage ==
On 4 November 1614 Sophie Elisabeth married her cousin, George Rudolf of Liegnitz in Dessau. A book was written to record their magnificent wedding celebrations. After marrying Sophie Elisabeth, George Rudolf converted from Lutheranism to Calvinism.

As duchess of Liegnitz, Sophie Elisabeth was a literary and musical patron. She brought many volumes of French and Italian works were brought to the ducal library. The writer Martin Opitz wrote several poems about Sophie Elisabeth.

Sophie Elisabeth and George Rudolf had no children together. She died, aged thirty, in 1620.

== Literatur ==
- O. von Heinemann, Geschichte der Abtei und Beschreibung der Stiftskirche zu Gernrode. (H. C. Huch, Quedlinburg 1877).
- H.K. Schulze, Das Stift Gernrode. Unter Verwendung eines Manuskriptes von Reinhold Specht. Mit einem kunstgeschichtlichen Beitrag von Günther W. Vorbrodt. (Mitteldeutsche Forschungen Bd. 38), Böhlau, Köln 1965.
- Friedrich Nick, Karl Friedrich Flögel: Die Hof und Volksnarren, sammt den närrischen Lustbarkeiten, vol. 2, (Scheible, Stuttgart, 1861).
- L. M. Koldau, Frauen-Musik-Kultur: ein Handbuch zum deutschen Sprachgebiet der Frühen Neuzeit (Böhlau-Verlag, 2005).
- B. Becker-Cantarino: Martin Opitz: Studien zu Werk und Person, (Rodopi, Amsterdam, 1982).
- J.S. Ersch, Allgemeine Encyclopädie der Wissenschaften und Künste in alphabetischer ..., (Brockhaus, Leipzig, 1855).
