= Dorothea of Saxony =

Daughter of Augustus, Elector of Saxony

- Coat-of-arms of elector of Saxony.
- Born: 4 October 1563; Dresden
- Died: 13 February 1587 (aged 23); Wolfenbüttel
- Noble family: House of Wettin
- Spouse: Henry Julius, Duke of Brunswick-Wolfenbüttel
- Issue: Dorothea Hedwig of Brunswick-Wolfenbüttel
- Father: Augustus, Elector of Saxony
- Mother: Anne of Denmark, Electress of Saxony

Dorothea of Saxony (German: Dorothea von Sachsen; 4 October 1563 in Dresden – 13 February 1587 in Wolfenbüttel) was a Saxon princess from the House of Wettin and by marriage Duchess of Brunswick-Wolfenbüttel.

== Life ==
Dorothea was born 4 October 1563, the daughter of the Elector Augustus of Saxony (1526–1586) and his wife Anna (1532–1585), daughter of King Christian III of Denmark. Of the four 15 children from the marriage of her parents, only four survived their father; Dorothea among them.

On 26 September 1585 in Wolfenbüttel, the twenty-two-year-old Dorothea married the future Duke Henry Julius of Brunswick-Wolfenbüttel (1564–1613), who was one year her junior. At the time, her mother Anna was seriously ill and Dorothea had felt very badly and cried pitifully when she said farewell.

The marriage would consolidate a Protestant alliance of German princes, led by Count Palatine John Casimir of Simmern, who had married Dorothea's sister Elizabeth in 1570. Unfortunately, the marriage would be short-lived as Dorothea would die in childbirth aged 23 on 13 February 1587.

Henry remarried a few years later on 19 April 1590. By his second wife, Elizabeth of Denmark, Henry had ten more children, one of whom was named Dorothea.

== Issue ==
From her marriage to Henry Julius Dorothea had one daughter:

- Dorothea Hedwig (1587–1609)

married in 1605 Rudolf of Anhalt-Zerbst (1576–1621)

== Ancestors ==
Ancestors of Dorothea of Saxony

16. Frederick II, Elector of Saxony (1412–1464)
8. Albert III, Duke of Saxony (1443–1500)
17. Margaret of Austria, Electress of Saxony (1416–1486)
4. Henry IV, Duke of Saxony (1473–1541)
18. George of Poděbrady (1420–1471)
9. Sidonie of Poděbrady (1449–1510)
19. Kunigunde of Sternberg (1425–1449)
2. Augustus, Elector of Saxony (1526–1586)
20. Eric II, Duke of Pomerania (1425–1474)
10. Magnus II, Duke of Mecklenburg (1441–1503)
21. Dorothea of Brandenburg, Duchess of Mecklenburg (1420–1491)
5. Catherine of Mecklenburg (1487–1561)
22. Eric II, Duke of Pomerania (1425–1474)
11. Sophie of Pomerania, Duchess of Mecklenburg (1460–1504)
23. Sophia of Pomerania-Stolp (1435–1497)
1. Dorothea of Saxony
24. Christian I of Denmark (1426–1481)
12. Frederick I of Denmark (1471–1533)
25. Dorothea of Brandenburg (1430–1495)
6. Christian III of Denmark (1503–1559)
26. John Cicero, Elector of Brandenburg (1455–1499)
13. Anna of Brandenburg (1487–1514)
27. Margaret of Thuringia (1449–1501)
3. Anne of Denmark, Electress of Saxony (1532–1585)
28. John V, Duke of Saxe-Lauenburg (1439–1507)
14. Magnus I, Duke of Saxe-Lauenburg (1470–1543)
29. Dorothea of Brandenburg, Duchess of Saxe-Lauenburg (1446–1519)
7. Dorothea of Saxe-Lauenburg (1511–1571)
30. Henry IV, Duke of Brunswick-Lüneburg (1463–1514)
15. Catherine of Brunswick-Wolfenbüttel, Duchess of Saxe-Lauenburg (1488–1563)
31. Catherine of Pomerania (d. 1526)

== References and sources ==
- Wilhelm Havemann: Geschichte der Lande Braunschweig und Lüneburg, p. 421
- Günter Meißner: Saur allgemeines Künstlerlexikon, K.G. Saur Verlag, p. 508
- Jörg Jochen Berns: Höfische Festkultur in Braunschweig-Wolfenbüttel, 1590-1666: Vorträge eines ..:, p. 421
- Karl August Muffat: Die Verhandlungen der protestantischen Fürsten in den Jahren 1590 und 1591 ..., p. 5
