= John George I =

John George I may refer to:

- John George I, Prince of Anhalt-Dessau (1567–1618)
- John George I, Elector of Saxony (1585–1656)
- John George I, Duke of Saxe-Eisenach (1634–1686)
