= Marie Elisabeth of Brunswick-Wolfenbüttel =

Duchess consort of Saxe-Eisenach (1638–1687)

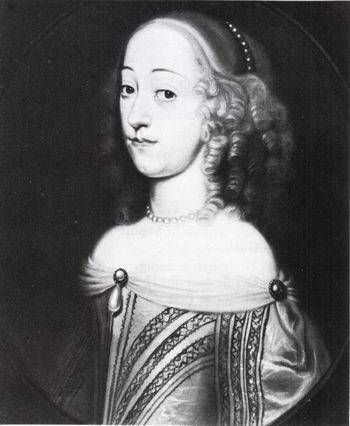

Duchess consort of Saxe-Eisenach
- Tenure: 1663-1668

Duchess consort of Saxe-Coburg
- Tenure: 1680–1687
- Born: 7 January 1638; Brunswick
- Died: 15 February 1687 (aged 49); Coburg
- Spouse: Adolf William, Duke of Saxe-Eisenach (m. 1663; died 1668) Albert, Duke of Saxe-Coburg (m. 1676)
- Issue: Karl August, Hereditary Prince of Saxe-Eisenach; Frederick William, Hereditary Prince of Saxe-Eisenach; Adolf William, Hereditary Prince of Saxe-Eisenach; Ernest August, Hereditary Prince of Saxe-Eisenach; William August, Duke of Saxe-Eisenach; Prince Ernest August of Saxe-Gotha-Altenburg
- House: Welf
- Father: Augustus, Duke of Brunswick-Lüneburg
- Mother: Elisabeth Sophie of Mecklenburg

Marie Elisabeth of Brunswick-Wolfenbüttel (7 January 1638 - 15 February 1687), was a German noblewoman of the House of Welf and by her two marriages Duchess of Saxe-Eisenach and Saxe-Coburg.

Marie Elisabeth was the daughter of Augustus the Younger, Duke of Brunswick-Lüneburg and his third wife, Duchess Elisabeth Sophie of Mecklenburg. Marie Elisabeth and her older brother Ferdinand Albert were the only surviving children of their parents' marriage. In addition, they had seven older half-siblings from Duke Augustus' two previous marriages, of whom only four survive adulthood: Rudolph Augustus, Sibylle Ursula (by marriage Duchess of Holstein-Glücksburg), Clara Augusta (by marriage Duchess of Württemberg-Neustadt) and Anthony Ulrich, all born from Augustus' second marriage with Dorothea of Anhalt-Zerbst.

== Life ==
In 1663, Marie Elisabeth married firstly Adolf William, Duke of Saxe-Eisenach. They had five sons:

1. Karl August, Hereditary Prince of Saxe-Eisenach (Eisenach, 31 January 1664 - Eisenach, 14 February 1665).
2. Frederick William, Hereditary Prince of Saxe-Eisenach (Eisenach, 2 February 1665 - Eisenach, 3 May 1665).
3. Adolf William, Hereditary Prince of Saxe-Eisenach (Eisenach, 26 June 1666 - Eisenach, 11 December 1666).
4. Ernest August, Hereditary Prince of Saxe-Eisenach (Eisenach, 28 August 1667 - Eisenach, 8 February 1668).
5. William August, Duke of Saxe-Eisenach (Eisenach, 30 November 1668 - Eisenach, 23 February 1671).

Duke Adolf William died on 21 November 1668, leaving his widow heavily pregnant with their fifth and last child. Nine days later, William August was born and became Duke of Saxe-Eisenach from the moment of his birth, under the guardianship of his uncle John George; however, being a sickly child like all his four older brothers, died aged 2, and Saxe-Eisenach passed to John George.

In 1676, Marie Elisabeth married secondly Albert V, Duke of Saxe-Coburg. After their marriage, the couple settled in Saalfeld, who was designed as Albert's residence. They had one son:

1. Ernest August (Saalfeld, 1 September 1677 – Saalfeld, 17 August 1678).

After concluding a definitive treaty of partition with his brothers, in 1680 Albert received Coburg, where he and Marie Elisabeth moved their residence.

Marie Elisabeth died in Coburg, aged 49, having survived all her sons. Her widower remarried morganatically one year later and died childless in 1699.

== Sources ==
Beck, August (1875). "Adolf Wilhelm". Allgemeine Deutsche Biographie 1 (in German). Archived from the original on November 12, 2025.

Marie Elisabeth of Brunswick-Wolfenbüttel House of Wettin Born: 7 January 1638 Died: 15 February 1687
German royalty
New creation	Duchess consort of Saxe-Eisenach; 1663-1668	Vacant Title next held by Johannetta of Sayn-Wittgenstein
New creation	Duchess consort of Saxe-Coburg; 1680-1687	Vacant Title next held by Anna Sophie of Schwarzburg-Rudolstadt as Duchess of Saxe-Coburg-Saalfeld
