= George Aribert of Anhalt-Dessau =

George Aribert of Anhalt-Dessau (Dessau, 3 June 1606 – Wörlitz, 14 November 1643), was a German prince of the House of Ascania and (titular) ruler of the principality of Anhalt-Dessau.

He was the sixth son of John George I, Prince of Anhalt-Dessau and Dorothea, daughter of John Casimir of Simmern. In fact, he was the second and youngest son of John George and Dorothea who survived to adulthood; two of his older brothers, Frederick Maurice and Henry Waldemar, died in infancy.

== Life ==
After the death of his father in 1618, the twelve-year-old George Aribert was put under the custody of his older brother John Casimir. Nominally, the young prince was co-ruler with his brother, but he never took a real part in the government of Dessau.

In 1619 Georg Aribert was accepted by his uncle Louis of Anhalt-Köthen in the Fruitbearing Society. The Bitter orange tree was chosen as his emblem.

George Aribert performed military service in the Imperial army with Christoph Albrecht von Zanthierfrom 1625 to 1629.

After thirteen years of "co-government" between him and John Casimir, a treaty was signed on 28 January 1632 that divided the territories of Anhalt-Dessau; George Aribert took possession of just a few locations: Wörlitz (which he chose as his residence), Radegast, and Kleutsch.

== Marriage and issue ==
Around 1632 George Aribert decided to marry Anna Johanna Elisabeth von Krosigk (d. aft. 1686), of an old German nobility from the region of Saxony-Anhalt and daughter of Christoph von Krosigk (1576-1638) and his wife, Katharina Elisabeth von Peblis (d. 1653), sister of the Georg Hans von Peblis (1577-1650), a diplomat during the Thirty Years' War. Her father Christoph was "Cammerrath, Marschall und Hauptmann in Diensten" at the court of Georg Aribert's brother, John Casimir in Anhalt-Dessau.

This decision created many difficulties with his relatives, who were totally against the union. However, on 10 February 1637 they finally concluded a formal agreement to accept the union as morganatic.

Under the terms of the contract, the prince's wife would obtain all the rights of a legitimate spouse, but she was maintained in her rank as member of the old nobility, without raising her to princely rank, comital, or baronial nobility. George Aribert also promised not to ask the Emperor to elevate her status.

The children of the marriage were to be nobles only, and bear the name "von Aribert"; they were denied any rights to princely name, title, or arms, and also excluded from the succession to Anhalt. Nevertless, were assigned certain estates as well as a rent of 45,000 Thalers. The Estates (Landstände) of Anhalt-Dessau confirmed the contract the next day and promised never to recognize anyone excluded by the contract as prince or princess.

One month later, on 7 March 1637, George Aribert finally married Johanna Elisabeth. They had five children:

1. Sophie von Aribert (Countess of Bähringen from 6 February 1671) (b. 1637 – d. Wülknitz, 23 May 1695), married on 3 December 1682 to Gebhard Siegfried Edler von Plotho und Engelmünster (d. Hanau, 31 August 1689).
2. Dorothea Ariberte von Aribert (b. 16 October 1639 – d. Wörlitz, 3 May 1661).
3. Christian Aribert von Aribert (Count of Bähringen, Lord of Waldersee and Radegast from 6 February 1671) (d. Koblenz, 14 July 1677).
4. Eleonore von Aribert (Countess of Bähringen from 6 February 1671) (b. Wörlitz, 16 May 1642 – d. Baruth, 27 August 1677), married on 4 May 1675 to John George III, Count of Solms-Baruth.
5. Johanna von Aribert (d. Wörlitz, November 1660).

George Aribert died at age 37. All his lands reverted to Anhalt-Dessau.

Nevertheless, some years later (in 1660) his son Christian Aribert wrote to his cousin John George (son of John Casimir) to dispute the validity of his parents' contract with their relatives and claim the rank of Prince of Anhalt. The Emperor issued a rescript to the princes of Anhalt in 1661 where he claimed that he wanted to uphold the contract but could not deny justice to Christian Aribert.

In the end, Duke Ernest of Saxe-Gotha offered mediation, and an agreement was reached on 6 February 1671 with the Princes of Anhalt. The agreement gave Christian Aribert the title "Count of Bähringen, Lord of Waldersee and Radegast," and allowed him to style himself "Legitimate and only son of Prince George Aribert of Anhalt." For arms, he was allowed to use the traditional bear of Anhalt impaling Waldersee. Also, his two surviving sisters Sophie and Eleonore were created "Countesses of Bähringen."

No opposition would be made to his elevation to the rank of prince, as long as it was not to that of Prince of Anhalt. In case of the extinction of the entire House of Anhalt in all male lines, there would be no opposition to him or his male-line legitimate heirs making a claim to the principality. However, Christian Aribert died unmarried and childless in 1677; his two sisters both married at advanced ages and died without issue.
