= John George I of Saxe-Eisenach =

John George I
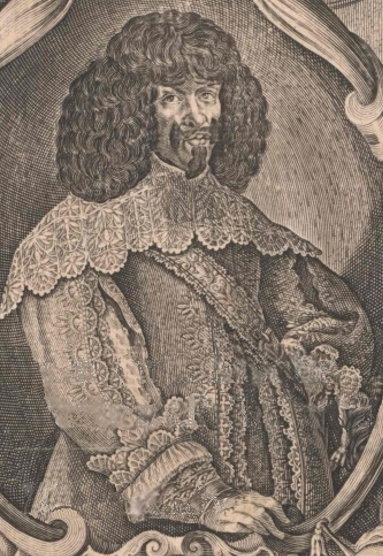

Duke of Saxe-Marksuhl
- Reign: 1662–1686
- Predecessor: New Creation
- Successor: Johann Georg II

Duke of Saxe-Eisenach
- Reign: 1671–1686
- Predecessor: William August
- Successor: Johann Georg II
- Born: 12 July 1634; Weimar
- Died: 19 September 1686 (aged 52); Eckhartshausen, Marksuhl
- Spouse: Johannetta of Sayn-Wittgenstein (m. 1661)
- Issue: Eleonore Erdmuthe Luise, Margravine of Brandenburg-Ansbach and Electress of Saxony; Frederick August, Hereditary Duke of Saxe-Eisenach; Johann Georg II, Duke of Saxe-Eisenach; John William III, Duke of Saxe-Eisenach; Fredericka Elisabeth, Duchess of Saxe-Weissenfels
- House: Wettin
- Father: Wilhelm, Duke of Saxe-Weimar
- Mother: Eleonore Dorothea of Anhalt-Dessau
- Religion: Lutheran

Johann Georg I, Duke of Saxe-Eisenach (Weimar, 12 July 1634 – hunting accident, Eckhartshausen, Marksuhl, 19 September 1686) was the fifth but third surviving son of William, Duke of Saxe-Weimar and Eleonore Dorothea of Anhalt-Dessau.

After the death of his father (1662), his older brother Johann Ernst II inherited Weimar, and his second brother Adolf Wilhelm received Eisenach. Johann Georg received an income from the new duchy of Saxe-Eisenach and took his residence in the small town of Marksuhl.

In 1668 his brother Adolf Wilhelm died. His fifth and only surviving son, Wilhelm August, was born eight days after his father's death and became duke from the moment of his birth; Johann George became the regent of the duchy and also the guardian of the new duke. Wilhelm August died in 1671 at only two years of age, and Johann Georg inherited the duchy.

The next year (1672) the death without heirs of the Duke Frederick Wilhelm III of Saxe-Altenburg forced a new treaty of division of the family lands between Johann Georg, his surviving brothers and his cousin. Johann Georg was confirmed in his possession of Eisenach and took some towns, and his younger brother, Bernhard, inherited Jena.

In the spring of 1672, when Johann Georg officially moved his residence from Marksuhl to Eisenach, the occasion was marked by a special Easter church service with music composed by Ambrosius Bach. His move reestablished Eisenach's status as the capital of the principality.

Johann Georg thus became the founder of the most recent line of the dukes of Saxe-Eisenach, who became extinct in 1741. He was ruler in 1685 when Johann Sebastian Bach was born in the duchy.

== Marriage and issue ==
In Wallau on 29 May 1661, Johann Georg married the Countess Johannetta of Sayn-Wittgenstein, heiress of Sayn-Altenkirchen. They had eight children:

1. Eleonore Erdmuthe Luise (b. Friedewald, 13 April 1662 - d. Schloss Pretzsch, 19 September 1696), married firstly on 4 November 1681 to Johann Friedrich, Margrave of Brandenburg-Ansbach, and secondly on 17 April 1692 to Johann Georg IV, Elector of Saxony. By her first marriage, Eleonore was the mother of the Queen Caroline of Brandeburg-Ansbach, wife of the King George II of Great Britain.
2. Frederick August, Hereditary Duke of Saxe-Eisenach (b. Friedewald, 30 October 1663 - killed in battle, Pressburg, 19 September 1684).
3. Johann Georg II, Duke of Saxe-Eisenach (b. Friedewald, 24 July 1665 - d. of smallpox, Eisenach, 10 November 1698).
4. Johann Wilhelm, Duke of Saxe-Eisenach (b. Friedewald, 17 October 1666 - d. Eisenach, 14 January 1729).
5. Maximilian Heinrich (b. Friedewald, 17 October 1666 - d. Altenkirchen, 23 July 1668), twin of Johann Wilhelm.
6. Louise (b. Friedewald, 18 April 1668 - d. Altenkirchen, 26 June 1669).
7. Fredericka Elisabeth (b. Altenkirchen, 5 May 1669 - d. Langensalza, 12 November 1730), married on 7 January 1698 to Johann Georg, Duke of Saxe-Weissenfels.
8. Ernst Gustav (b. Friedewald, 28 August 1672 - d. Altenkirchen, 16 November 1672).

== Bibliography ==
- Anton Balthasar König: Biographisches Lexikon aller Helden und Militärpersonen. Band 3, 1790, S. 337 Digitalisat
- Ernst Wülcker: Johann Georg I. (Herzog von Sachsen-Eisenach). In: Allgemeine Deutsche Biographie (ADB). Band 14, Duncker & Humblot, Leipzig 1881, S. 365 f.

Preceded by Wilhelm August	Duke of Saxe-Eisenach; 1671–1686	Succeeded by Johann Georg II
Preceded by Wilhelm of Saxe-Weimar	Duke of Saxe-Marksuhl; 1662–1686	Succeeded by Johann Georg II
