= Dorothea Hedwig of Brunswick-Wolfenbüttel =

- Princess of Anhalt-Zerbst
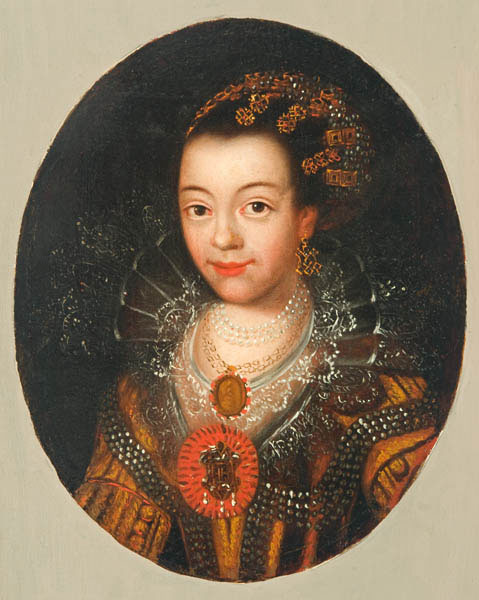
- Born: 3 February 1587; Wolfenbüttel
- Died: 16 October 1609 (aged 22); Zerbst
- Burial: Bartholomai Church in Zerbst
- Spouse: Rudolph, Prince of Anhalt-Zerbst
- Issue Detail: Dorothea; Eleonor
- Father: Henry Julius, Duke of Brunswick-Wolfenbüttel
- Mother: Dorothea of Saxony

Dorothea Hedwig of Brunswick-Wolfenbüttel (3 February 1587, Wolfenbüttel – 16 October 1609, Zerbst) was a princess of Brunswick-Wolfenbüttel by birth and by marriage Princess of Anhalt-Zerbst.

== Life ==
Dorothea Hedwig was the eldest child of the Duke Henry Julius of Brunswick-Wolfenbüttel (1564–1613) from his first marriage with Dorothea (1563–1587), daughter of the Elector August of Saxony (1526–1586). Her birth caused the death of her mother.

Dorothea Hedwig married on 29 December 1605 in Wolfenbüttel to Prince Rudolf von Anhalt-Zerbst (1576–1621). She died while giving birth to her fourth child, a still-born princess who was born an hour after the mother's death. The Princess was buried in the Bartholomai Church in Zerbst. Her motto was: The fear of the Lord is the beginning of wisdom.

== Children ==
From her marriage with Rudolp, Dorothea Hedwig had the following children:

- Daughter (1606–1606)
- Dorothea (1607–1634)

married in 1623 Duke Augustus the Younger of Brunswick-Wolfenbüttel (1579–1666)

- Eleonor (1608–1680)

married in 1632 Duke Frederick of Schleswig-Holstein-Sønderburg-Norburg (1581–1658)

- Stillborn daughter (1609–1609)
