= Countess Palatine Dorothea of Simmern =

- Princess of Anhalt-Dessau
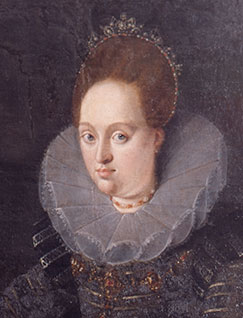
- Portrait c. 1600
- Born: 6 January 1581; Kaiserslautern
- Died: 18 September 1631 (aged 50); Sandersleben
- Burial: Church of St. Mary, Dessau
- Spouse: John George I, Prince of Anhalt-Dessau
- Issue: John Casimir, Prince of Anhalt-Dessau; Eleonore Dorothea, Duchess of Saxe-WeimarSibylle Christine, Countess of Hanau-Münzenberg and Hanau-Lichtenberg; George Aribert; Susanna Margarete, Coutness of Hanau-Lichtenberg
- House: House of Wittelsbach
- Father: John Casimir of the Palatinate-Simmern
- Mother: Elisabeth of Saxony

Countess Palatine Dorothea of Simmern (6 January 1581 – 18 September 1631) was a Countess Palatine of Simmern by birth and Princess of Anhalt-Dessau by marriage.

== Life ==
Dorothea was born in Kaiserslautern, the only surviving child of the Count Palatine John Casimir of Simmern (1543–1592) from his marriage to Elisabeth (1552–1590), the daughter of Elector Augustus of Saxony.

She married on 21 February 1595 in Heidelberg to John George I of Anhalt-Dessau (1567–1618). She was his second wife. She was led to the altar by her guardian, Elector Palatine Frederick IV. Under her influence, her husband openly converted to Calvinism in 1596. After his death, she retired to her widow seat Sandersleben Castle.

She was a member of the Virtuous Society under the nickname die Gastfreie ("the Hospitable").

Dorothea died in Sandersleben, aged 50, and was buried in the Church of St. Mary in Dessau. Her two eldest sons added a tomb stone to her grave in 1631.

== Issue ==
From her marriage Dorothea had the following children:

1. John Casimir, Prince of Anhalt-Dessau (7 September 1596 – 15 September 1660)
2. Anna Elisabeth (5 April 1598 – 20 April 1660), married on 2 January 1617 to William Henry, Count of Bentheim-Steinfurt
3. Frederick Maurice (18 February 1600 – 25 August 1610)
4. Eleonore Dorothea (16 February 1602 – 26 December 1664), married on 23 May 1625 to William, Duke of Saxe-Weimar
5. Sibylle Christine (11 July 1603 – 21 February 1686), married firstly on 26 December 1627 to Philip Maurice, Count of Hanau-Münzenberg, and secondly on 13 May 1647 to Frederick Casimir, Count of Hanau-Lichtenberg
6. Henry Waldemar (7 November 1604 – 25 September 1606)
7. George Aribert (3 June 1606 – 14 November 1643)
8. Kunigunde Juliane (17 February 1608 – 26 September 1683), married on 2 January 1642 to Herman IV, Landgrave of Hesse-Rotenburg
9. Susanna Margarete (23 August 1610 – 13 October 1663), married on 16 February 1651 to John Philip of Hanau-Lichtenberg
10. Johanna Dorothea (24 March 1612 – 26 April 1695), married on 9 February 1636 to Count Maurice of Bentheim-Tecklenburg (a nephew of her brother-in-law William Henry)
11. Eva Catherine (11 September 1613 – 15 December 1679)
