= Adolf William, Duke of Saxe-Eisenach =

Adolf William
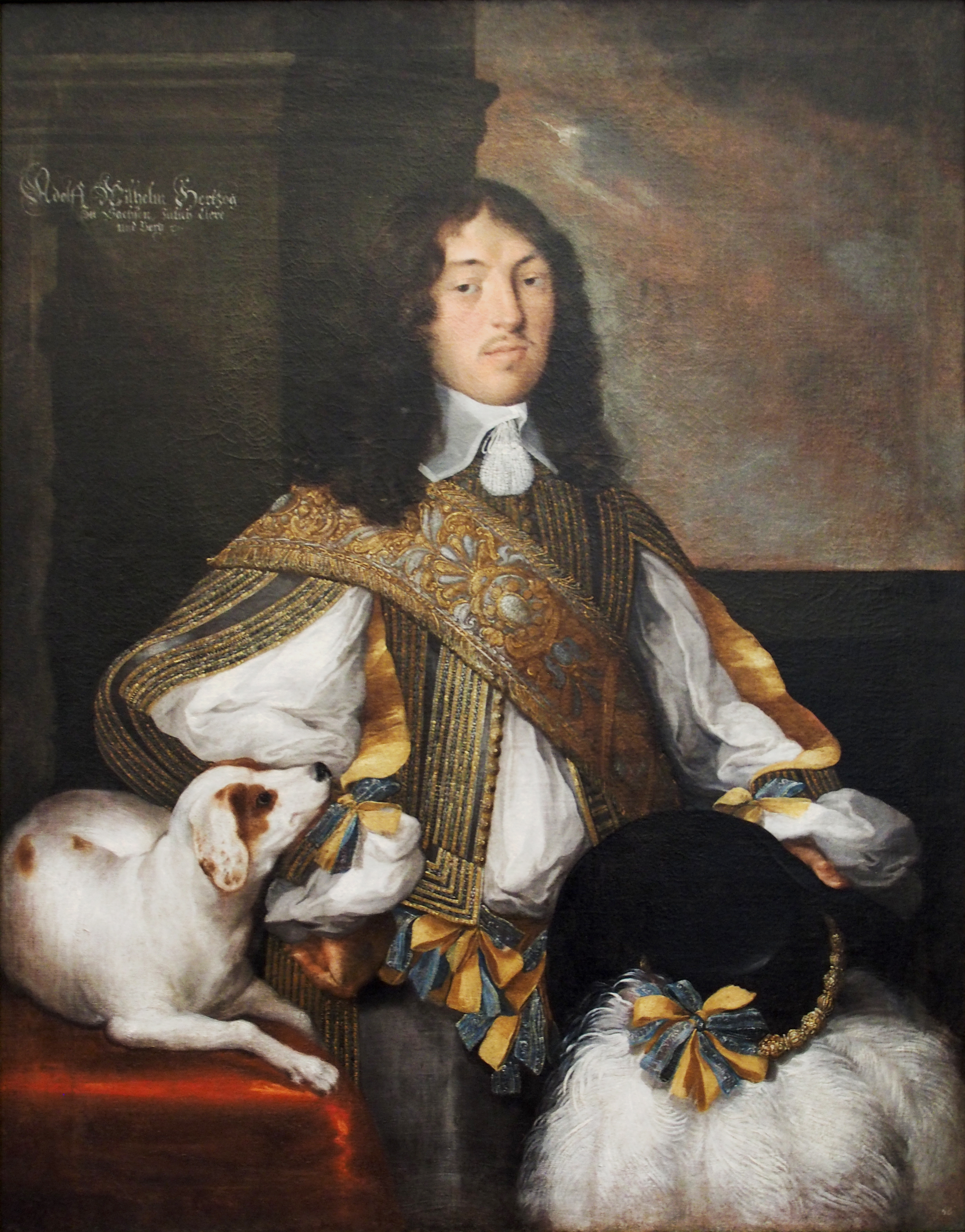
- Portrait, c. 1650–67

Duke of Saxe-Eisenach
- Reign: 1662–1668
- Predecessor: New Creation
- Successor: William August
- Born: 15 May 1632; Weimar
- Died: 21 November 1668 (aged 36); Eisenach
- Spouse: Marie Elisabeth of Brunswick-Wolfenbüttel (m. 1663)
- Issue: Prince Karl August; Prince Frederick Wilhelm; Prince Adolf Wilhelm; Prince Ernst August; William August
- House: House of Wettin
- Father: Wilhelm, Duke of Saxe-Weimar
- Mother: Eleonore Dorothea of Anhalt-Dessau
- Religion: Lutheran

Adolf Wilhelm, Duke of Saxe-Eisenach (Weimar, 15 May 1632 – Eisenach, 21 November 1668) was a duke of Saxe-Eisenach.

He was the fourth but second surviving son of Wilhelm, Duke of Saxe-Weimar and Eleonore Dorothea of Anhalt-Dessau.

When Adolf was nineteen years old, he traveled around several countries, in particular France. Subsequently, in 1656 entered the service of King Charles X Gustav of Sweden (who was at that time engaged in the Northern Wars against Poland) as a colonel, where Adolf was characterised by his courage and bravery. However, after a meeting in Funen with an imperial ambassador, Adolf transferred to the Imperial Army with the rank of colonel. In 1661, he traveled again to Sweden, and King Charles Gustav offered him the rank of major general of the infantry with a pay of 2000 talents; Adolf declined.

When his father died (1662) Adolf, with his older brother Johann Ernst, divided the paternal estates. He received Eisenach and its Schloss Wilhelmsburg, with its large garden, where he made his residence. His two younger brothers, Johann Georg and Bernhard, received only incomes from the duchies of their older brothers.

== Marriage and issue ==
In Wolfenbüttel on 18 January 1663, Adolf married Marie Elisabeth of Brunswick-Wolfenbüttel. They had five children:

1. Karl August (b. Eisenach, 31 January 1664 - d. Eisenach, 14 February 1665).
2. Frederick Wilhelm (b. Eisenach, 2 February 1665 - d. Eisenach, 3 May 1665).
3. Adolf Wilhelm (b. Eisenach, 26 June 1666 - d. Eisenach, 11 December 1666).
4. Ernst August (b. Eisenach, 28 August 1667 - d. Eisenach, 8 February 1668).
5. Wilhelm August, Duke of Saxe-Eisenach (b. posthumously, Eisenach, 30 November 1668 - d. Eisenach, 23 February 1671).

Adolf lost all his sons shortly after birth, and his widow was pregnant with their fifth child at the time of his death. Eight days later, a son was born, called Wilhelm August, who inherited the estates of his father (under the regency of his uncle Johann Georg), until his death at only two years of age, whereupon Johann Georg inherited the estates.

== Notes ==
Preceded by Wilhelm of Saxe-Weimar	Duke of Saxe-Eisenach; 1662–1668	Succeeded by Wilhelm August
