= Susanna Margarete of Anhalt-Dessau =

Princess of Anhalt-Dessau (1610–1663)

- Countess of Hanau-Lichtenberg
- Born: 23 August 1610; Dessau
- Died: 13 October 1663 (aged 53); Babenhausen
- Spouse: Johann Philipp of Hanau-Lichtenberg
- House: Ascania
- Father: John George I, Prince of Anhalt-Dessau
- Mother: Countess Palatine Dorothea of Simmern

Susanna Margarete of Anhalt-Dessau (23 August 1610, Dessau – 13 October 1663, Babenhausen), was by birth a member of the House of Ascania and princess of Anhalt-Dessau. After her marriage she became Countess of Hanau-Lichtenberg.

She was the eighth daughter of John George I, Prince of Anhalt-Dessau, but fifth-born daughter of his second wife Dorothea, daughter of John Casimir of Simmern.

== Life ==
In 1641, at the age of thirty-one, Susanna Margarete was betrothed to John Ernest, Count of Hanau-Münzenberg-Schwarzenfels, the last male heir of the line of Hanau-Münzenberg; however, he died of smallpox in 1642, shortly before the wedding was to take place.

In Buchsweiler on 16 February 1651, Susanna Margarete married John Philip of Hanau-Lichtenberg, younger brother of the ruling Count Frederick Casimir, husband of her older sister Sibylle Christine of Anhalt-Dessau. Probably on account of the substantial age difference between the spouses (Susanna Margarete was sixteen years older than John Philip), the marriage was childless.

The emblem book of Dorothea of Anhalt-Zerbst contains the signatures of Susanna Margarete, her mother, and sister.
