= Christoph Wilhelm Megander =

German Protestant theologian (1626–1676)

- Born: 1626
- Died: 22 August 1676; Sommersdorf
- Theological work
- Era: 17th century
- Language: German
- Tradition or movement: Lutheran

Christoph Wilhelm Megander (1626 – 22 August 1676 in Sommersdorf) was a German Protestant theologian.

== Life ==
From 1653 to 1671 he served as chaplain in the Norburg and confessor to Duchess consort Eleanor of Schleswig-Holstein-Sønderburg-Norburg, née Princess of Anhalt-Zerbst (10 November 1608 in Zerbst – 2 November 1681 in Osterholm). She married Duke Frederick as his second wife in 1632.

In 1671, he went to the Duchy of Magdeburg and became a vicar in Sommersdorf. He held this post until his death in 1676.

Megander was married and had one daughter.
