= Anne of Denmark, Electress of Saxony =

Electress of Saxony from 1553 to 1585

Anne of Denmark
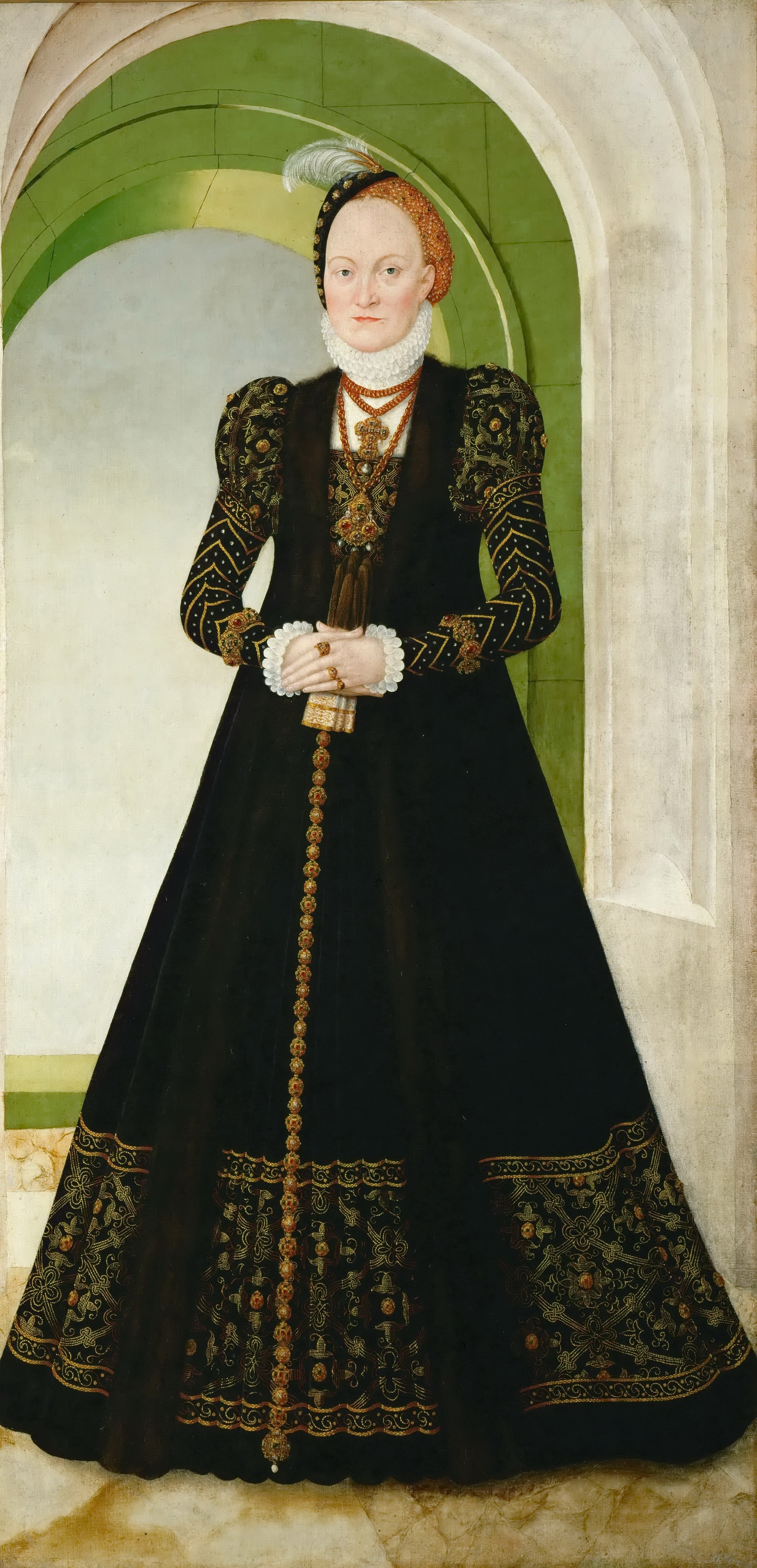
- Portrait of Anne of Denmark, by Lucas Cranach the Younger

Electress consort of Saxony
- Tenure: 9 July 1553 – 1 October 1585
- Born: 22 November 1532; Haderslev
- Died: 1 October 1585 (aged 52); Dresden
- Spouse: Augustus, Elector of Saxony
- Issue among others...: Christian I, Elector of Saxony; Elisabeth, Countess Palatine of Simmern; Dorothea, Duchess of Brunswick-Lüneburg; Anna, Duchess of Saxe-Coburg-Eisenach
- House: Oldenburg
- Father: Christian III of Denmark
- Mother: Dorothea of Saxe-Lauenburg
- Religion: Lutheran

Anne of Denmark (Danish and German: Anne; Haderslev, 22 November 1532 – Dresden, 1 October 1585) was a Danish princess from the House of Oldenburg. Through her marriage to Augustus of Saxony, she became Electress of Saxony. She was renowned for her medical knowledge both in the preparation of herbal remedies and her involvement in midwifery. Her interest contributed to the development of farming and horticulture in Saxony. She was a major influence in the introduction of orthodox Lutheranism and played a role in the decision to persecute Calvinists.

== Childhood ==
Anne of Denmark was a daughter of King Christian III of Denmark and Norway and his wife Dorothea of Saxe-Lauenburg. Her mother taught her the basic principles of gathering medicinal plants and preparing herbal remedies. After the introduction of Protestantism in Denmark-Norway in 1537, she was raised as a strict orthodox Lutheran.

In March 1548 she became betrothed to Augustus of Saxony, the younger brother and possible heir of Elector Maurice of Saxony. This marriage supported the Danish ambition to have closer ties to Germany. The Elector on his part wanted to achieve better relations with the Lutheran factions. The wedding took place in Torgau in October 1548. It was the first major festivity in the reign of Elector Maurice and the first opportunity for the Albertinian line of the House of Wettin to present themselves as Electors of Saxony, a title they had obtained in 1547.

== Electress ==
Anne and Augustus initially lived in Weißenfels. When Augustus became Elector in 1553 following the death of his brother Maurice, they lived mainly in Dresden. They had fifteen children, four of whom reached adulthood. Their marriage was considered to be harmonious.

Anne of Denmark was a great writer of letters and kept a good archive of her correspondence. Her letters provide detailed insight into her daily life and her involvement in the political and religious affairs of her time. In Saxony, and throughout Europe, she was considered to be a person of considerable influence. She was a very active advocate of Lutheranism and played a role in the suppression of crypto-Calvinism in Saxony between 1574 and 1577. It is unclear to what extent she was involved in the harsh persecution of Calvinists which included torture and long periods of incarceration. She had good relations with other royal and princely houses and was frequently asked to act as an intermediary, in conflicts as well as in marriage negotiations.

== Medical Practice ==
Like most noblewomen during her time, Anne of Denmark had a strong understanding of medical care. She provided basic medical care to her servants and courtiers as well as local poor who were ill. Her social status as the daughter of King Christian III of Denmark (1503–1559) and the wife of Elector August of Saxony (1526–1586) gave her connections throughout the Holy Roman Empire which she used to exchange medical recipes and knowledge with other nobles. Her interest in medical alchemy and her social connections allowed her to develop medical skills and a reputation as a medical practitioner.

Anne’s medicinal practices and cures were well-known across the Holy Roman Empire and she often received letters asking for medical advice or cures from nobles, including Emperor Maximilian II, as well as commoners, and even learned physicians like Joseph Neefe, a court physician.

Anne’s most popular medicine was aqua vitae which she learned directly from the personal instruction of Countess Dorothea of Mansfeld from 1555-1559. Yellow and white aqua vitae were particularly complicated alcoholic distillations of water infused with herbs. They were remedies for dizziness, epidemic disease, stroke, epilepsy, dropsy, plague, chest congestion, heart palpitations, evil stomach, constipation, and eye pain. Anne used her communication network to distribute her salve, gifting it to acquaintances and nobles, most especially around gift giving times like New Year’s. In addition to gifting her aqua vitae to friends, she also felt it was important to help those who were ill and poor. Anne would often help those that approached her asking for advice and kept a dedicated medical cabinet for the poor who were ill.

As Anne’s skill improved, she emphasized the importance of proper technique and careful attention in each step of the production process. Anne called this focus on the making of her medicines "handiwork" and it would remain an important aspect of her medical practice throughout her career. Beyond her practice making remedies, she later redesigned instruments used in the distillation process to be more efficient. These improvements included new flasks with longer necks and stronger glass jars to transport her aqua vitae.

The princely hunting lodge at Lochau Castle in Saxony-Anhalt was torn down, rebuilt as a large distilling house with an extensive herb garden and an apothecary. Renamed "Annaburg", it was the first Saxon palace apothecary and was the primary place Anne would practice her medical distillation. The other was Dresden palace which had an alchemical laboratory built behind it. Both were necessary to keep up with the demands for her medications. Anne was helped by hosts of servants in both locations but still maintained some hands-on role in the making process which she felt was important to the learning process. At the time of her death, Annaburg stores "contained 181 different types of distilled waters ... as well as thirty-two medicinal oils, six vinegars, and two jars of rose honey." These are a symbol of her medical legacy.

Anne’s interest in medicine went beyond making medicines. She also was involved in the profession of midwifery. Anne recognized the lack of skilled midwives in Saxony for local, poor women. She focused on creating more training opportunities for new midwives through the teachings of older, more skilled midwives. In 1564, Anne asked the Zwickau council for an older midwife to train new midwives and be compensated for it. Continuing her efforts to help the midwifery issue, in December of 1570, she wrote to Martin Pfinzing, a merchant and city Councilor in Nuremberg, to ask for his help in getting more midwives into the Saxony region.

Having been pregnant at least 12 times by 1570, Anne was familiar with the process of pregnancy and birth. For this reason, noblewomen throughout the Holy Roman Empire contacted Anne for questions relating to their pregnancies and births. Anne's response was often to recommend avoiding certain foods and for the women to "have trust in God". Depending on the condition of the woman, she would also sometimes provide medicines she made like Kinderbalsam and Kinderöl to help. Anne was in close contact with Mother Marta, a skilled and trusted midwife in Saxony and would often send her to help noblewomen with their births. If Mother Marta was not available or the woman lived too far away, Anne would help arrange a midwife for them.

== Agriculture and Land Management ==
During her lifetime, Anne of Denmark was known for her skill in managing gardens and farmland. In 1578, her husband entrusted her with the management of all his estates. She contributed to the development of agriculture in Saxony by introducing new crops and new species of livestock, and promoted the introduction of horticulture as practiced in the Low Countries and Denmark. This had a positive effect on the economy of Saxony, which became one of the most prosperous parts of Germany.

== Death ==
Anne of Denmark died on 1 October 1585, after a long period of ill health. She remains one of the best known electresses of Saxony, partly because of biographies written about her in the 19th century which emphasize her traditional role as 'mother of the nation.' She is also remembered for her medicinal legacy as she is now considered to have been the first female pharmacist in Germany.

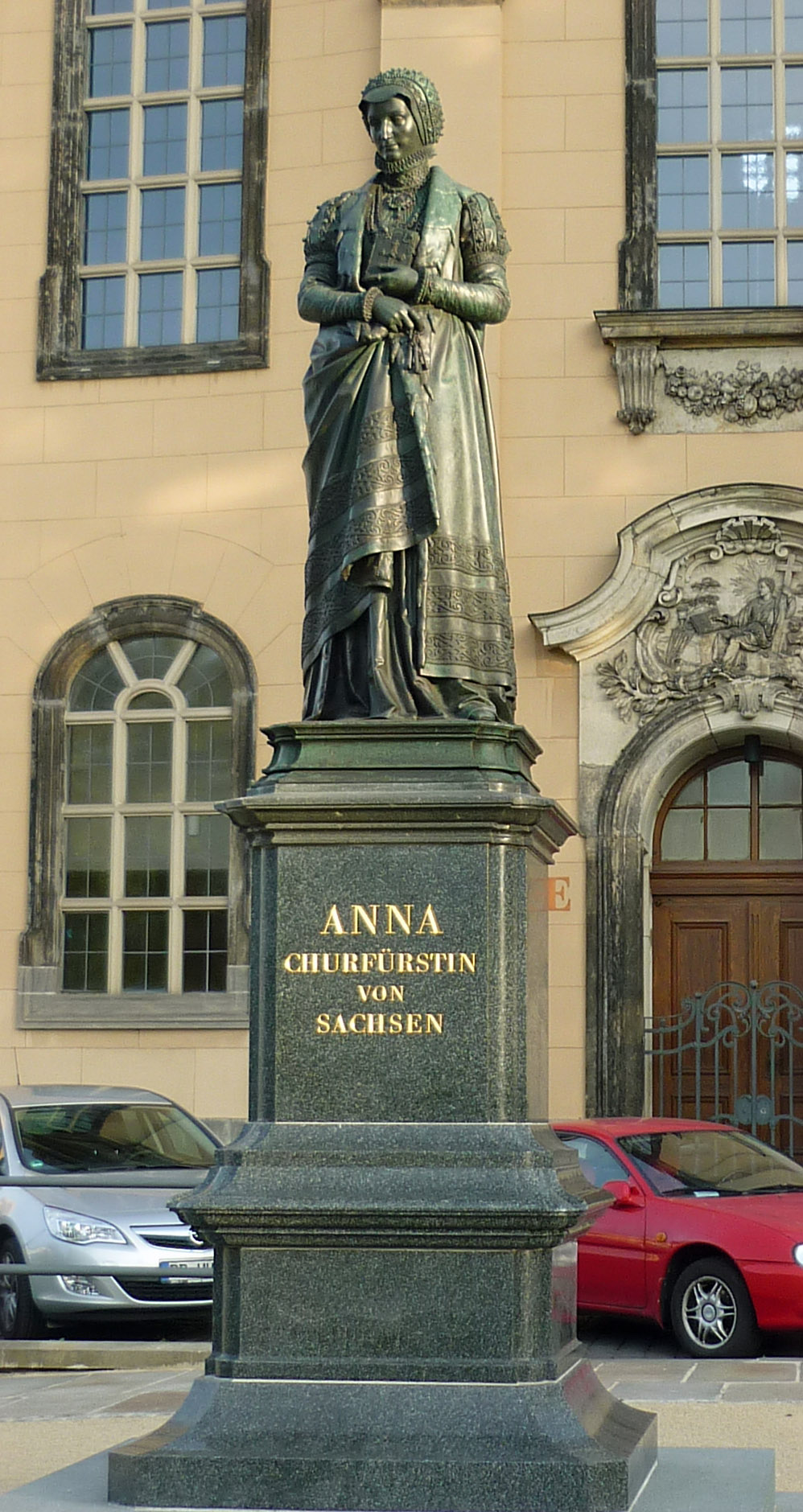
Statue of Anne of Denmark in Dresden

== Children ==
1. John Henry (b. Weissenfels, 5 May 1550 – d. Weissenfels, 12 November 1550).
2. Eleonore (b. Wolkenstein, 2 May 1551 – d. Wolkenstein, 24 April 1553).
3. Elisabeth (b. Wolkenstein, 18 October 1552 – d. imprisoned in Heidelberg, 2 April 1590), married on 4 June 1570 to Count Palatine Johann Casimir of Simmern; they were separated in 1589.
4. Alexander (b. Dresden, 21 February 1554 – d. Dresden, 8 October 1565), Hereditary Elector of Saxony.
5. Magnus (b. Dresden, 24 September 1555 – d. Dresden, 6 November 1558).
6. Joachim (b. Dresden, 3 May 1557 – d. Dresden, 21 November 1557).
7. Hector (b. Dresden, 7 October 1558 – d. Dresden, 4 April 1560).
8. Christian I (b. Dresden, 29 October 1560 – d. Dresden, 25 September 1591), successor of his father in the Electorship.
9. Marie (b. Torgau, 8 March 1562 – d. Torgau, 6 January 1566).
10. Dorothea (b. Dresden, 4 October 1563 – d. Wolfenbüttel, 13 February 1587), married on 26 September 1585 to Duke Heinrich Julius of Brunswick-Wolfenbüttel.
11. Amalie (b. Dresden, 28 January 1565 – d. Dresden, 2 July 1565).
12. Anna (b. Dresden, 16 November 1567 – d. imprisoned in Veste Coburg, 27 January 1613), married on 16 January 1586 to Duke John Casimir, Duke of Saxe-Coburg-Eisenach; they divorced in 1593.
13. Augustus (b. Dresden, 23 October 1569 – d. Dresden, 12 February 1570).
14. Adolf (b. Stolpen, 8 August 1571 – d. Dresden, 12 March 1572).
15. Frederick (b. Anneberg, 18 June 1575 – d. Anneberg, 24 January 1577).

== Ancestry ==
Ancestors of Anne of Denmark, Electress of Saxony

8. Christian I of Denmark
4. Frederick I of Denmark
9. Dorothea of Brandenburg
2. Christian III of Denmark
10. John Cicero, Elector of Brandenburg
5. Anna of Brandenburg
11. Margaret of Thuringia
1. Anna of Denmark
12. John V, Duke of Saxe-Lauenburg
6. Magnus I, Duke of Saxe-Lauenburg
13. Dorothea of Brandenburg
3. Dorothea of Saxe-Lauenburg
14. Henry IV, Duke of Brunswick-Lüneburg
7. Catherine of Brunswick
15. Catherine of Pomerania-Wolgast

== Literature ==
- Böttcher, Hans-Joachim (2018), Elisabeth von Sachsen und Johann Kasimir von der Pfalz: Ein Ehe- und Religionskonflikt [Elisabeth of Saxony and John Casimir of the Palatinate: A Marital and Religious Conflict] (in German), Dresden: Dresdner Buchverlag, ISBN 9783946906063.
- Delau, Reinhard (1 November 1995), "From the history of Ostragehege (3): rise and fall of the Ostra chamber estate", SZ.
- Inhetveen, Heath (1999), "Agrarpionierinnen. Women as bearers of the agricultural progress", in Heidrich, Hermann (ed.), Frauenwelten: Arbeit, Leben, Politik und Perspektiven auf dem Land [Women's Worlds: Work, life, politics and prospects in the country] (in German), Bath Windsheim: Verl Franconian Open-air Museum, ISBN 3-926834-41-2.
- Keller, Katrin (2000), "Princess Anna of Saxony. Of possibilities and limits of a "mother country"", in Hirschbiegel, Jan; Paravicini, Werner (eds.), Das Frauenzimmer: die Frau bei Hofe in Spätmittelalter und früher Neuzeit [The Women's Room: The woman at the court in late medieval and early modern] (in German), Stuttgart: Thorbecke, ISBN 3-7995-4511-5.
- Klein, Thomas (1962), "The battle for the 2nd Reformation in Saxony 1586-91", Mitteldt. Research, 25.
- Posse, Otto (1897), The House of Wettin, Leipzig: Giesecke & Devrient.
- Robbers, Hellmut (June 1994), "Gardening and landscape design", The Union, 4.
- Schlude, Ursula (2000), Die Hofhalterin - Kurfürstin Anna von Sachsen : 1532-1585 [The Hofhalterin. Princess Anna of Saxony 1532–1585], Women of the Renaissance, WDR.
- Schlude, Ursula; Inhetveen, Heath; High, Albrecht (2005), "From the shops of the Princess", Research (Magazine of the DFG), 2: 22–24.
- Schmidt, Otto Eduard (1913), Saxon raids, Leipzig: Grunow.
- Sturmhoefel, Konrad (1905), Kurfürstin Anna von Sachsen : ein politisches und sittengeschichtliches Lebensbild aus dem XVI. Jahrhundert [Princess Anna of Saxony. A political and cultural historical picture of life from the 16th century], Leipzig: Haberland.
- Victor, August Richard (1859), The Elector of Saxony, Chancellor Nicholas Krell, Dresden: Kuntze.
- von Weber, Carl (1865), Anna, Duchess of Saxony Churchill, Leipzig: Tauchniz.

Anne of Denmark, Electress of Saxony House of Oldenburg Born: 22 November 1532 Died: 1 October 1585
German royalty
Preceded by Agnes of Hesse	Electress consort of Saxony; 9 July 1553 – 1 October 1585	Vacant Title next held by Agnes Hedwig of Anhalt
