= Palatinate-Lautern =

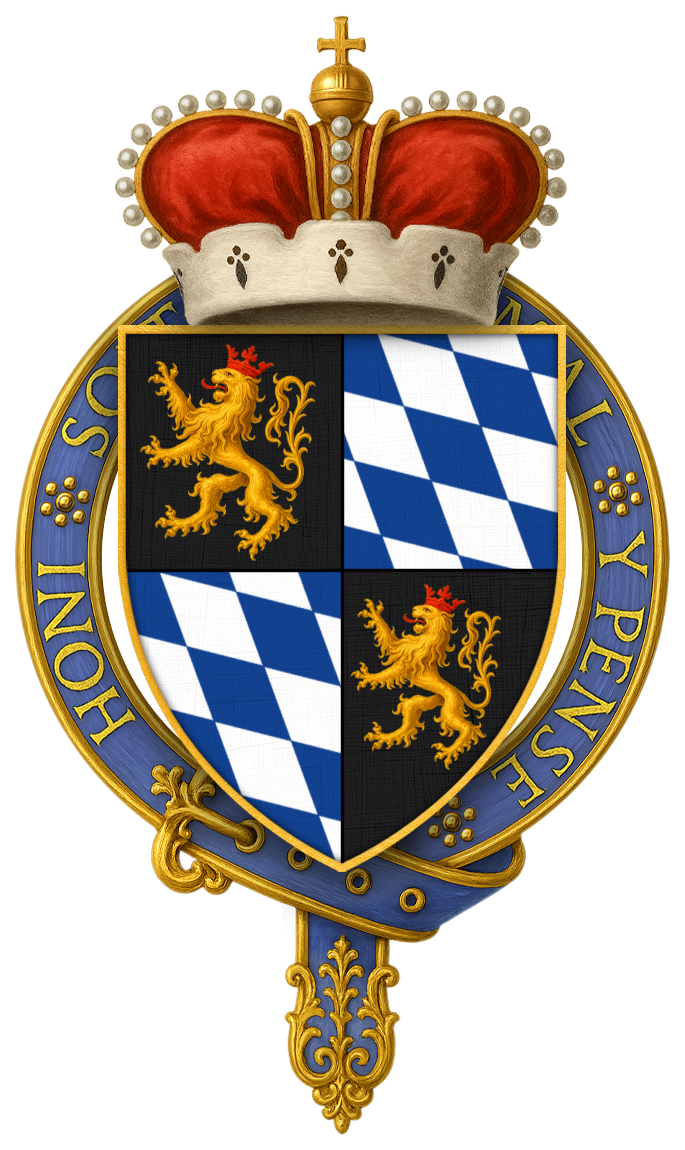
Palatinate-Lautern; Pfalz-Lautern
1576–1592
Capital; Circle; Bench	Lautern; Upper Rhenish; Council of Princes
Partitioned from the Electorate of the Palatinate	1576
Extinct; to the Electorate of the Palatinate	1592

Palatinate-Lautern was a state of the Holy Roman Empire based around Lautern and Neustadt an der Weinstrasse in the south of modern Rhineland-Palatinate, Germany.

Palatinate-Lautern was partitioned from the Electorate of the Palatinate in 1576 after the death of Frederick III, Elector Palatine for his younger son John Casimir. John Casimir accepted Huguenot refugees from France and Calvinist exiles from the Palatinate, making it a Calvinist stronghold. John Casimir was convinced by Queen Elizabeth I of England to establish a Protestant League in Germany against the Catholic states and the Holy Roman Emperor, making it one of the most influential states in its day. John Casimir died in 1592 without heirs, so Palatinate-Lautern was returned to the Palatinate which was ruled by his loved nephew, that under his regency had become an extremist calvist.

However, consequently to the balance of power between Catholics and Protestants, the State maintained its separate seat to the Reichstag.
