= Saxe-Marksuhl =

European polity

Duchy of Saxe-Marksuhl Herzogtum Sachsen-Marksuhl
- 1662–1671
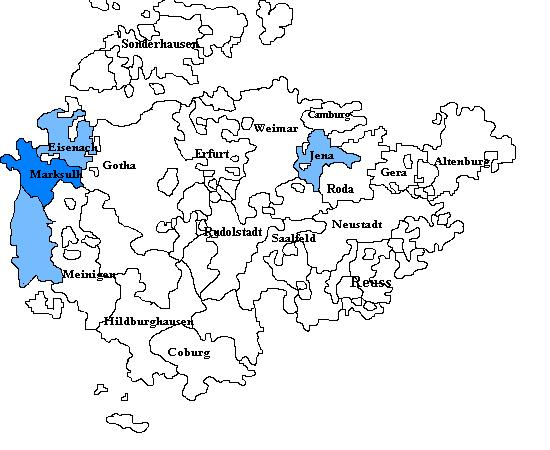
- Status: State of the Holy Roman Empire
- Capital: Marksuhl
- Government: Principality
- Historical era: Middle Ages
  - Partitioned from Saxe-Weimar: 1662 1662
  - Incorporated into Saxe-Eisenach: 1671 1671
Preceded by	Succeeded by
Saxe-Weimar	Saxe-Eisenach

The Duchy of Saxe-Marksuhl was one of the Saxon Duchies held by the Ernestine line of the Wettin Dynasty. Established in 1662 for John George I, third son of Wilhelm, Duke of Saxe-Weimar. Originally John George was supposed to share Saxe-Eisenach with his older brother, Adolf William. Johann Georg finally accepted the receipt of an income from the duchy of Saxe-Eisenach and made his residence in the small town of Marksuhl. Saxe-Marksuhl was reincorporated into Saxe-Eisenach on the accession of John George to the Duchy of Saxe-Eisenach upon his nephew's death in 1671.

== Duke of Saxe-Marksuhl ==
- John George I (1662–1671)
