= Eleanor of Anhalt-Zerbst =

German noblewoman (1608–1681)

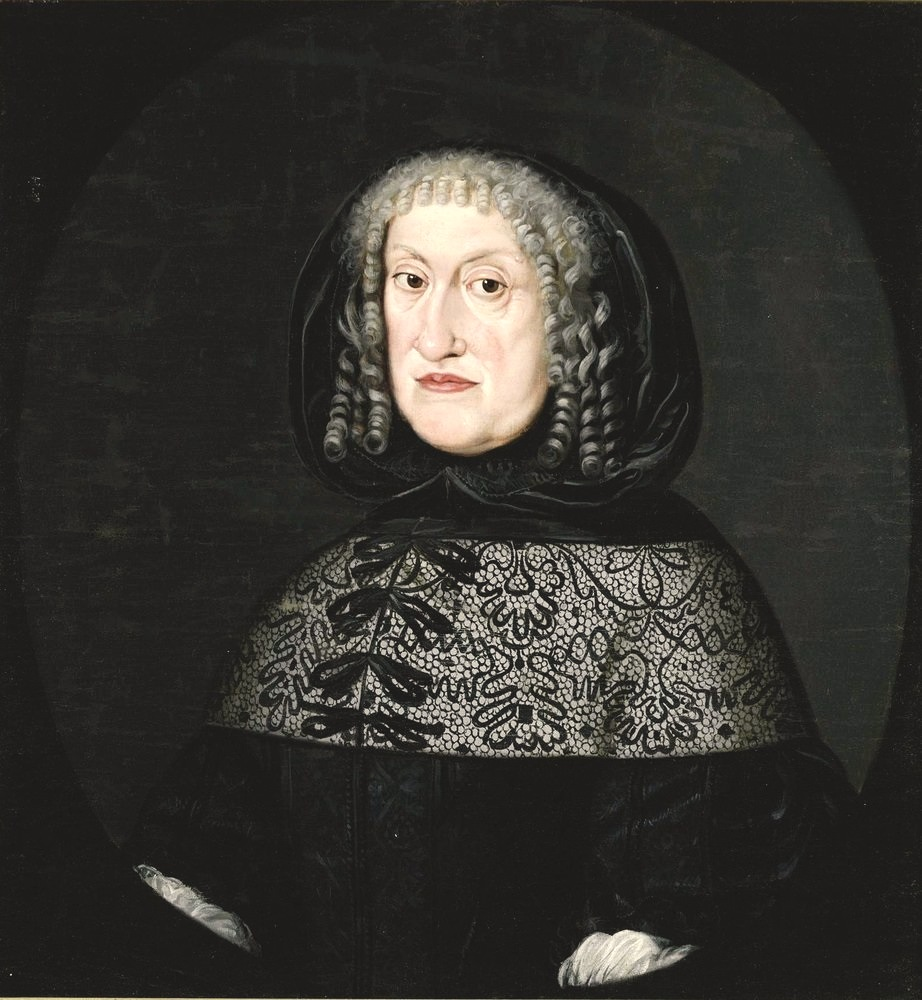
- Eleanor of Anhalt-Zerbst, Duchess of Schleswig-Holstein-Sønderburg-Norburg
- Born: 10 November 1608; Zerbst, Principality of Anhalt-Zerbst
- Died: 2 November 1681 (aged 72); Østerholm Castle on Als
- Noble family: House of Ascania
- Spouse: Frederick, Duke of Schleswig-Holstein-Sønderburg-Norburg
- Father: Rudolph, Prince of Anhalt-Zerbst
- Mother: Dorothea Hedwig of Brunswick-Wolfenbüttel

Eleonore of Anhalt-Zerbst (10 November 1608, in Zerbst – 2 November 1681, in Østerholm Castle, Als) was a member of the House of Ascania and a princess of Anhalt-Zerbst by birth and by marriage Duchess of Schleswig-Holstein-Sonderburg-Norburg.

== Life ==
Eleanor was a daughter of Prince Rudolph of Anhalt-Zerbst (1576-1621) from his first marriage to Dorothea Hedwig (1587-1609), daughter of Duke Heinrich Julius of Brunswick-Wolfenbüttel.

She married on 15 February 1632 in Norburg with Duke Frederick of Schleswig-Holstein-Sønderburg-Norburg (1581-1658). She was his second wife. The ducal court in Nordborg had meager financial resources and Eleanor's children had to seek a career elsewhere. The theologian Christoph Wilhelm Megander acted as her confessor from 1653 onwards. During the reign of her step-son John Bogislaw, the duchy experienced a bankruptcy and the fief was terminated by Denmark.

Eleanor died in 1681 on her widow's seat Østerholm Castle on Als and was buried beside her husband.

== Issue ==
From her marriage Eleanor had the following children:

- Unnamed child (1633–1633)
- Elisabeth Juliane (1634–1704)

married in 1656 Duke Anton Ulrich of Brunswick-Wolfenbüttel (1633–1714)

- Dorothea Hedwig, abbess of Gandersheim Abbey from 1665 to 1678

married in 1678 Count Christopher of Rantzau-Hohenfeld (1625–1696)

- Christian Augustus (1639–1687), English admiral
- Louise Amöna (1642–1685)

married in 1665 Count John Frederick I of Hohenlohe-Neuenstein-Oehringen (1617–1702)

- Rudolph Frederick (1645–1688)

married in 1680 Countess Bibiane of Promnitz (1649–1685)

== See also ==
- Principality of Anhalt
- House of Ascania
