= Elisabeth of Saxony =

Countess Palatine of Simmern

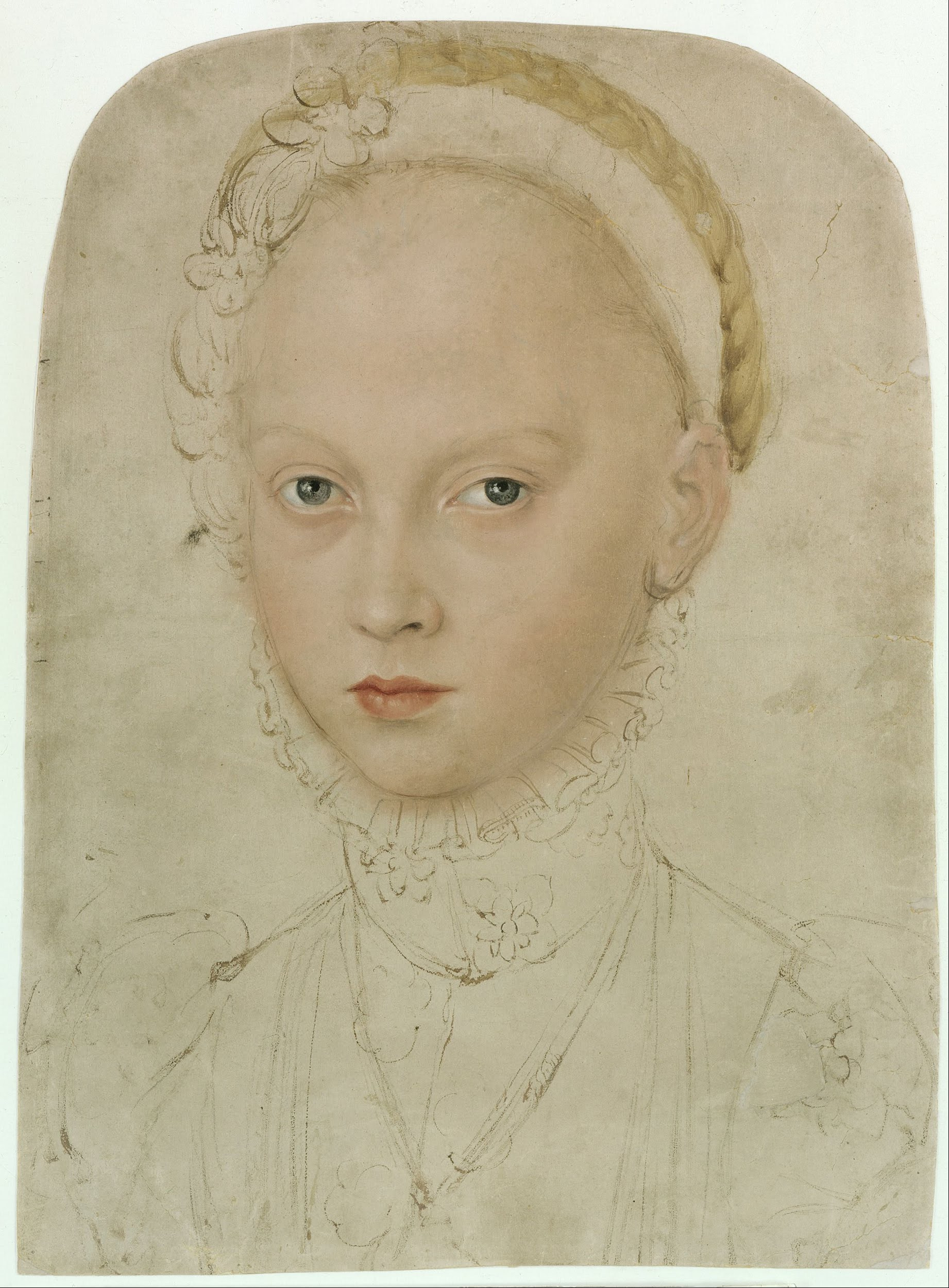
- Born: 18 October 1552; Wolkenstein Castle in Wolkenstein
- Died: 2 April 1590 (aged 37); Heidelberg
- Noble family: House of Wettin
- Spouse: John Casimir of the Palatinate-Simmern
- Issue Detail: Countess Palatine Dorothea of Simmern
- Father: August, Elector of Saxony
- Mother: Anna of Denmark

Elisabeth of Saxony (18 October 1552, at Wolkenstein Castle in Wolkenstein – 2 April 1590, in Heidelberg) was a Saxon princess, and Countess Palatine of Simmern by marriage to John Casimir of the Palatinate-Simmern.

== Life ==
Elisabeth was a daughter of the Elector August of Saxony (1526–1586) from his marriage to Anna (1532–1585), daughter of King Christian III of Denmark.

She married on 4 June 1570 in Heidelberg during the Diet of Speyer with Count Palatine John Casimir of Simmern (1543–1592). August opposed the policies of John Casimir, who was a Calvinist and friendly to France. With this marriage, August hoped to woo John Casimir over to the Lutheran side. However, he did not succeed. The Catholics in Germany regarded the marriage as a provocation against the Habsburg dynasty and an attempt to form a united Protestant front.

The Calvinist Johann Casimir tried to break the religious opposition of his Lutheran wife. In October 1585, she was arrested and accused of adultery and a murder plot against her husband. Even her brother, Elector Christian I, was convinced of her guilt. She converted to Calvinism while in captivity, and died shortly afterwards.

== Marriage and issue ==
From her marriage with John Casimir, Elizabeth had the following children:

- Unnamed son (1573)
- Marie (1576–1577)
- Elisabeth (1578–1580)
- Dorothea (1581–1631), married in 1595 Prince John George I of Anhalt-Dessau (1598–1618)
- Unnamed daughter (1584)
- Unnamed daughter (1585)

== Ancestors ==
Ancestors of Elisabeth of Saxony

8. Albert III, Duke of Saxony (1443–1500)
4. Henry IV, Duke of Saxony (1473–1541)
9. Sidonie of Poděbrady (1449–1510)
2. August, Elector of Saxony (1526–1586)
10. Magnus II, Duke of Mecklenburg (1441–1503)
5. Catherine of Mecklenburg (1487–1561)
11. Sophie of Pomerania, Duchess of Mecklenburg (1460–1504)
1. Elisabeth of Saxony
12. King Frederick I of Denmark (1471–1533)
6. King Christian III of Denmark (1503–1559)
13. Anna of Brandenburg (1487–1514)
3. Anne of Denmark, Electress of Saxony (1532–1585)
14. Magnus I, Duke of Saxe-Lauenburg (1470–1543)
7. Dorothea of Saxe-Lauenburg (1511–1571)
15. Catherine of Brunswick-Wolfenbüttel, Duchess of Saxe-Lauenburg (1488–1563)

== Royal descendants ==
- The current reigning monarchs King Charles III of the United Kingdom, King Carl XVI Gustaf of Sweden, King Felipe VI of Spain, King Harald V of Norway, Willem-Alexander of the Netherlands, King Frederik X of Denmark, King Philippe of Belgium and Grand Duke Guillaume V of Luxembourg are all her direct-line descendants.
