= Rudolph, Prince of Anhalt-Zerbst =

German prince (1576–1621)

Rudolph
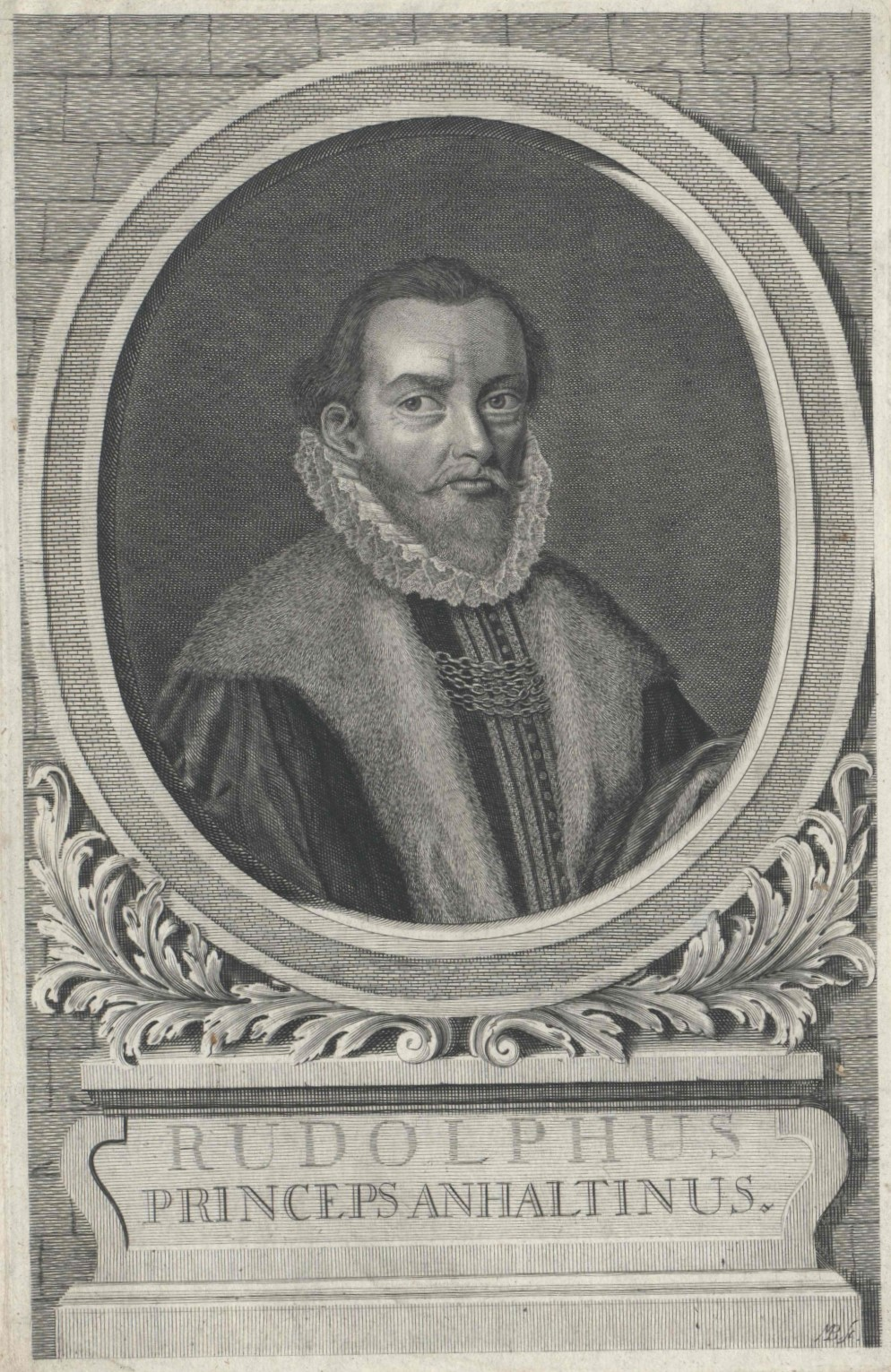
- Engraving of Rudolph
- Born: 28 October 1576; Harzgerode
- Died: 30 July 1621 (aged 44); Zerbst
- Spouse: Dorothea Hedwig of Brunswick-Wolfenbüttel; Magdalene of Oldenburg
- Issue Detail: Dorothea; Eleonore; John VI, Prince of Anhalt-Zerbst
- House: House of Ascania
- Father: Joachim Ernest, Prince of Anhalt
- Mother: Eleonore of Württemberg

Rudolph of Anhalt-Zerbst (Harzgerode, 28 October 1576 – Zerbst, 30 July 1621), was a German prince of the House of Ascania and ruler of the unified Principality of Anhalt. From 1603, he was ruler of the principality of Anhalt-Zerbst.

Rudolph was the fifth son of Joachim Ernest, Prince of Anhalt, but third-born son by his second wife Eleonore, daughter of Christoph, Duke of Württemberg.

== Life ==
In 1586, after the death of his father, Rudolph inherited the principality of Anhalt jointly with his half- and full brothers, but because he was still a minor, his older brother John George I acted as regent.

By the accounts of contemporary witnesses, Rudolph was an eager pupil and student. In 1596 the twenty-year-old prince was invited to the coronation of King Christian IV of Denmark in Copenhagen.

His Grand Tour began in 1600 when he arrived in Sicily. With his younger brother Louis, Rudolph spent a year in Florence. On 21 November 1601 he was admitted to the University of Siena. A year later, in 1602, the prince left Switzerland (where he had lived for some time) and returned to Dessau.

In 1603, a formal division of the principality of Anhalt was agreed upon by Rudolph and his surviving brothers. He received Zerbst, where his main residence was, and supported there the renovation of the Gymnasium Francisceum, beginning with the addition of a library. In 1618, Rudolph joined the Fruitbearing Society.

== Marriages and issue ==
In Wolfenbüttel on 29 December 1605 Rudolph married Dorothea Hedwig (born Wolfenbüttel, 3 February 1587 – d. Zerbst, 16 October 1609), daughter of Henry Julius, Duke of Brunswick-Lüneburg. They had four daughters:

1. Stillborn daughter (Zerbst, October? 1606).
2. Dorothea (born Zerbst, 25 September 1607 – d. Hitzacker, 26 September 1634), married on 26 October 1623 to Augustus, Duke of Brunswick-Lüneburg.
3. Eleonore (born Zerbst, 10 November 1608 – d. Osterholm, 2 November 1681), married on 15 February 1632 to Frederick, Duke of Schleswig-Holstein-Sonderburg-Norburg.
4. Stillborn daughter (Zerbst, 16 October 1609).

The death of his wife caused Rudolph to fall into a deep depression, according to contemporary witnesses.

In Oldenburg on 31 August 1612 Rudolph married for a second time to Magdalene (born Oldenburg, 6 October 1585 – d. Coswig, 14 April 1657), heiress of Jever and daughter of John VII, Count of Oldenburg; only when Rudolph met her did he find a way out of his depression. They had two children:

1. Elisabeth (born Zerbst, 1 December 1617 – d. Oldenburg, 3 June 1639).
2. John VI, Prince of Anhalt-Zerbst (born Zerbst, 24 March 1621 – d. Zerbst, 4 July 1667).

== Notes ==
Rudolph, Prince of Anhalt-Zerbst House of Ascania Born: 28 October 1576 Died: 30 July 1621
Preceded by Joachim Ernest	Prince of Anhalt with John George I, Christian I, Bernhard (until 1596), Augustus, John Ernest (until 1601) and Louis; 1586–1603	Succeeded by Principality partitioned in Anhalt-Dessau, Anhalt-Bernburg, Anhalt-Plötzkau, Anhalt-Zerbst and Anhalt-Köthen
New division	Prince of Anhalt-Zerbst; 1603–1621	Succeeded by John VI
Preceded by John VII	Lord of Jever; 1603–1621	Succeeded by John VI
