= Johann Philipp of Hanau-Lichtenberg =

- Born: 23 January 1626; Bouxwiller
- Died: 18 December 1669 (aged 43); Babenhausen
- Noble family: House of Hanau
- Spouse: Susanna Margarete of Anhalt-Dessau
- Father: Philipp Wolfgang, Count of Hanau-Lichtenberg
- Mother: Johanna of Oettingen-Oettingen

Count Johann Philipp of Hanau-Lichtenberg (13 January [O.S. 23 January] 1626 in Bouxwiller – 18 December 1669 in Babenhausen) was a son of Count Philipp Wolfgang (1595–1641) and his wife, Countess Johanna of Oettingen-Oettingen (1602–1639).

During his childhood, his parents had to flee several times from their county seat in Bouxwiller to nearby Strasbourg, where the family possessed a mansion, to avoid the fighting of the Thirty Years' War. As the second son, he was assigned the castle and district of Babenhausen in his father's testament. He could only take possession of Babenhausen in 1647, as it had been occupied by Mainz during the war. After the war ended, Johann Philipp and his younger brother Johann Reinhard (1628–1666) went on a Grand Tour to Germany, the Netherlands, England, France and Switzerland.

In 1664 Johann Philipp visited the Diet of Regensburg, where he got into a duel against a prince of House of Reuss. In 1669 he tried to stage a coup against his brother Friedrich Casimir who had burdened the county of Hanau with heavy debts and was trying to improve his financial situation by selling a part of his territory. Friedrich Casimir's relatives disagreed and in November 1669, they seized power during his absence. Their emergency government collapsed after three days and Friedrich Casimir was restored to power. Friedrich Casimir then exiled Johann Philipp from the city of Hanau.

Johann Philipp died the next month, on 18 December 1669 and was buried in the St. Nikolaus church in Babenhausen, where his wife had been buried earlier.

== Marriage and issue ==
On 16 February 1651, he married Princess Susanna Margarete of Anhalt-Dessau (1610–1663). She was a daughter of Johann Georg I, Prince of Anhalt-Dessau (1567–1618) and Countess Palatine Dorothea of Simmern. She was a younger sister of Princess Sibylle Christine of Anhalt-Dessau (1603–1686), the second wife of Friedrich Casimir, who was the reigning count and an older brother of Johann Philipp. The marriage remained childless.

Johann Philipp had several illegitimate children. At least three are documented:

- A daughter (b. after 1663), married to a customs official name Cressl
- A son (b. after 1663), who used the family name of Berg and served as an officer in the militia of Hanau
- Another son (b. after 1663), who also used the family name of Berg and also served as an officer in the militia of Hanau

Nothing is known about the mother or mothers of these children.

== Ancestors ==
Ancestors of Johann Philipp of Hanau-Lichtenberg

8. Philipp V, Count of Hanau-Lichtenberg (1541–1599)
4. Johann Reinhard I, Count of Hanau-Lichtenberg (1568–1625)
9. Ludowika Margaretha of Zweibrücken-Bitsch (1540–569)
2. Philipp Wolfgang, Count of Hanau-Lichtenberg (1595–1641)
10. Wolfgang of Hohenlohe-Neuenstein (1546–1610)
5. Maria Elisabeth of Hohenlohe-Neuenstein (1576–1605)
11. Magdalena of Nassau-Dillenburg (1547–1643)
1. Johann Philipp of Hanau-Lichtenberg
12. Gottfried of Oettingen (1554–1622)
6. Ludwig Eberhard of Oettingen-Oettingen (1577–1634)
13. Johanna of Hohenlohe-Neuenstein (1557–1585)
3. Johanna of Oettingen-Oettingen (1602–1639)
14. Georg III, Count of Erbach-Breuberg (1548–1605)
7. Margarethe von Erbach (1576–1636)
15. Anna of Solms (1557–1586)
