= Eleonore Dorothea of Anhalt-Dessau =

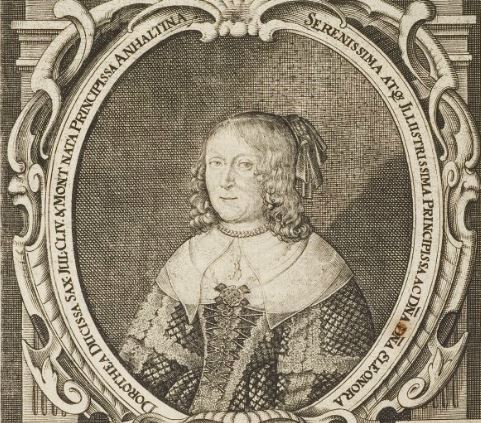
- Born: 16 February 1602; Dessau
- Died: 26 December 1664 (aged 62); Weimar
- Spouse: William, Duke of Saxe-Weimar (m. 1625; died 1662)
Names
- Eleonore Dorothea of Anhalt-Dessau
- House: House of Ascania
- Father: John George I, Prince of Anhalt-Dessau
- Mother: Countess Palatine Dorothea of Simmern

Eleonore Dorothea of Anhalt-Dessau (born 16 February 1602 in Dessau – died 26 December 1664 in Weimar), was a princess of Anhalt-Dessau by birth and by marriage Duchess of Saxe-Weimar.

== Life ==
Eleonore Dorothea was a daughter of the prince John George I of Anhalt-Dessau (1567–1618) from his second marriage with Dorothea (1581–1631), daughter of the Count Palatine John Casimir of Simmern.

She married on 23 May 1625 in Weimar, with her cousin Duke William the Great of Saxe-Weimar (1598–1662), with whom she had been engaged before his campaign in Lower Saxony. The marriage was closed for political reasons: it should deepen the friendly relations between Anhalt and Saxe-Weimer. The marriage was nevertheless described as a very happy one. Eleonore Dorothea remained faithful to the Reformed Church during her marriage, even though she came closer to the Lutheran doctrine, which her husband followed.

She died in 1664 and was initially buried in the chapel of the Schloss in Weimar. In 1824, her body was transferred to the new Ducal Crypt at Weimar.

== Issue ==
From her marriage Dorothea Eleonore had the following children:

1. Wilhelm (b. Weimar, 26 March 1626 – d. Weimar, 1 November 1626)
2. Johann Ernst II, Duke of Saxe-Weimar (b. Weimar, 11 September 1627 – d. Weimar, 15 May 1683)
3. Johann Wilhelm (b. Weimar, 16 August 1630 – d. Weimar, 16 May 1639)
4. Adolf Wilhelm, Duke of Saxe-Eisenach (b. Weimar, 14 May 1632 – d. Eisenach, 22 November 1668)
5. Johann Georg I, Duke of Saxe-Marksuhl, later of Saxe-Eisenach (b. Weimar, 12 July 1634 – d. on hunt accident, Eckhartshausen, 19 September 1686). Grandfather of Caroline of Brandenburg-Ansbach, Queen Consort of George II of Great Britain.
6. Wilhelmine Eleonore (b. Weimar, 7 June 1636 – d. Weimar, 1 April 1653)
7. Bernhard II, Duke of Saxe-Jena (b. Weimar, 14 October 1638 – d. Jena, 3 May 1678)
8. Frederick (b. Weimar, 19 March 1640 – d. Weimar, 19 August 1656)
9. Dorothea Marie (b. Weimar, 14 October 1641 – d. Moritzburg, 11 June 1675), married on 3 July 1656 to Maurice, Duke of Saxe-Zeitz.
