= John Casimir, Prince of Anhalt-Dessau =

German price (1596–1660)

John Casimir
- Prince of Anhalt-Dessau
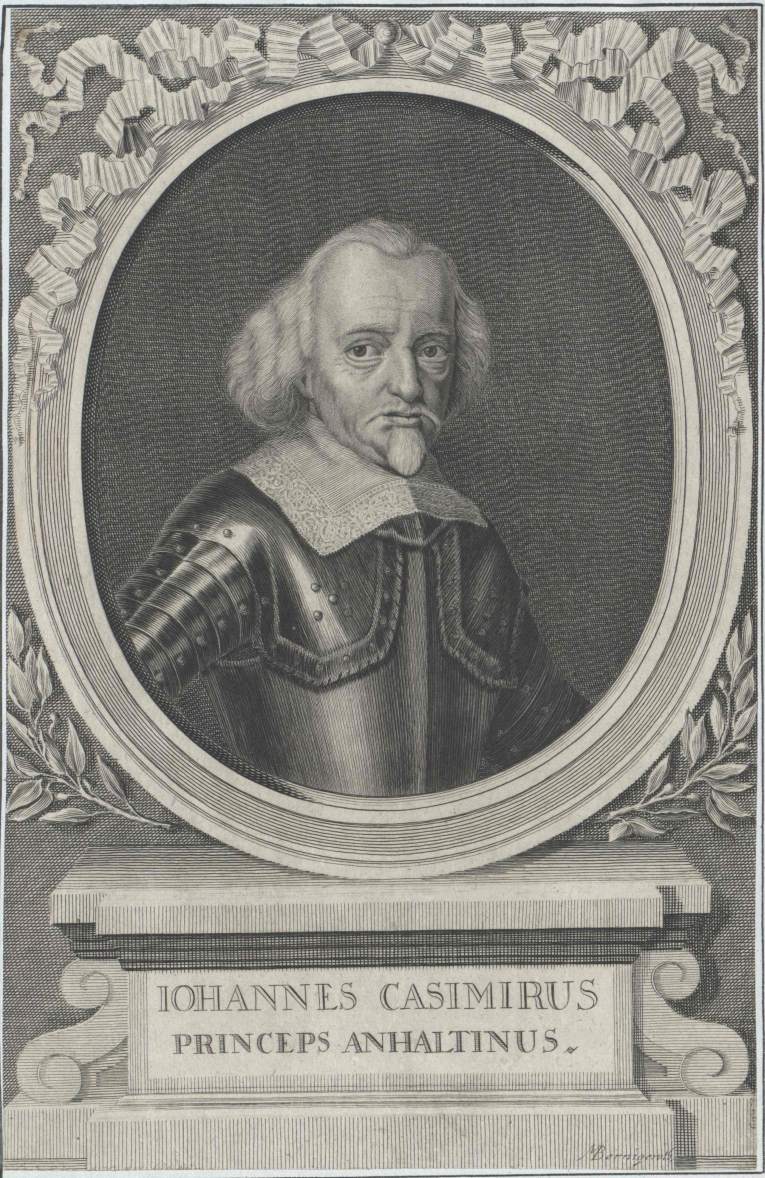

Prince of Anhalt-Dessau
- Reign: 1618–1660
- Predecessor: John George I
- Successor: John George II
- Born: 17 December 1596; Dessau, Principality of Anhalt, Holy Roman Empire
- Died: 15 September 1660 (aged 63); Dessau, Principality of Anhalt, Holy Roman Empire
- Spouse: Agnes of Hesse-Kassel; Sophie Margarete of Anhalt-Bernburg
- Issue: Maurice, Hereditary Prince of Anhalt-Dessau; Dorothea; Juliane; John George II, Prince of Anhalt-Dessau; Louise, Duchess of Brieg; Agnes
Names
- German: Johann Kasimir
- House: House of Ascania
- Father: John George I, Prince of Anhalt-Dessau
- Mother: Countess Palatine Dorothea of Simmern

John Casimir, Prince of Anhalt-Dessau (17 December 1596 – 15 September 1660), was a German prince of the House of Ascania. He was ruler of the principality of Anhalt-Dessau from 1618 to 1660.

During his reign the tasks of government were carried out by a committee of court officials, because he devoted much of his time to hunting.

== Early life and education ==
John Casimir was born in Dessau on 7 September 1596 as the third (but second surviving) son of John George I, Prince of Anhalt-Dessau, and the first-born child from his second marriage to Dorothea, daughter of John Casimir of Simmern.

After instruction with local tutors during his early years, John Casimir studied with his cousin Christian II of Anhalt-Bernburg in Geneva from 1608 to 1609. His tutors there were the Hofmeisters Markus Friedrich Wendelin and Peter von Sebottendorf.

The death of his older brother Joachim Ernest in 1615 made him the new heir of Dessau. Two years later, in 1617, his uncle Louis of Anhalt-Köthen, made him a member of the Fruitbearing Society.

== Reign ==
In 1618, after the death of his father, John Casimir succeeded him in Anhalt-Dessau, but the tasks of government were carried out by a committee of court officials, because the new prince devoted much of his time to hunting.

A hunting accident on 4 October 1652 left him confined to bed for several years. During this time, in order to distract him, the famous poet and writer Philipp von Zesen was employed in his household.

=== Death and succession ===
John Casimir died in Dessau on 15 September 1660, aged 64. He was succeeded as prince of Anhalt-Dessau by his eldest surviving son, John George.

== Personal life ==
=== Marriages ===
In Dessau on 18 May 1623 John Casimir married Agnes (b. Kassel, 13 April 1606 – d. Dessau, 28 May 1650), daughter of Maurice, Landgrave of Hesse-Kassel. They had six children.

In Dessau on 14 July 1651 John Casimir married for a second time to his cousin Sophie Margarete (b. Amberg, 16 September 1615 – d. Dessau, 27 December 1673), daughter of Christian I, Prince of Anhalt-Bernburg. The union was childless.

=== Issue ===
Name	Birth	Death	Notes
By Agnes of Hesse-Kassel
Maurice, Hereditary Prince of Anhalt-Dessau	Dessau, 7 November 1624	Dessau, 30 December 1624	
Dorothea	Dessau, 24 October 1625	Dessau, 21 July 1626	
Juliane	Dessau, 17 September 1626	Dessau, 30 November 1652	
John George II, Prince of Anhalt-Dessau	Dessau, 7 November 1627	Berlin, 17 August 1693	
Louise	Dessau, 10 February 1631	Oława, 25 April 1680	married on 24 November 1648 to Christian, Duke of Brieg
Agnes	Dessau, 12 March 1644	Dessau, 13 May 1644	

John Casimir, Prince of Anhalt-Dessau House of Ascania Born: 7 September 1596 Died: 15 September 1660
Preceded by John George I	Prince of Anhalt-Dessau; 1618–1660	Succeeded by John George II
