= William August, Duke of Saxe-Eisenach =

William August

Duke of Saxe-Eisenach
- Reign: 1668–1671
- Predecessor: Adolf William
- Successor: Johann Georg I
- Born: 30 November 1668; Eisenach
- Died: 23 February 1671 (aged 2); Eisenach
- House: House of Wettin
- Father: Adolf Wilhelm, Duke of Saxe-Eisenach
- Mother: Marie Elisabeth of Brunswick-Wolfenbüttel
- Religion: Lutheran

Wilhelm August, Duke of Saxe-Eisenach (30 November 1668 – 23 February 1671) was the youngest and only surviving son of Adolf Wilhelm, Duke of Saxe-Eisenach and Marie Elisabeth of Brunswick-Wolfenbüttel.

All his older brothers died before his father, and Wilhelm August, the fifth and youngest child, was born nine days after the death of Adolf Wilhelm (21 November 1668) and succeeded him in the duchy of Saxe-Eisenach from the moment of his birth, under the guardianship of his uncle Johann Georg.

A sickly boy, he died at Eisenach when only two years old, and Eisenach was inherited by his uncle Johann Georg.

Preceded by Adolf Wilhelm	Duke of Saxe-Eisenach; 1668–1671	Succeeded by Johann Georg I
