= John George I of Anhalt-Dessau =

John George I
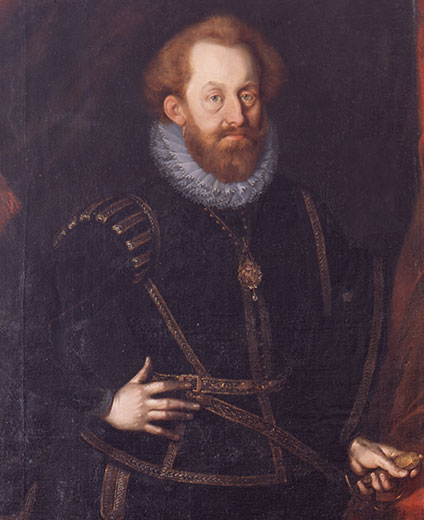
- Portrait c. 1600

Prince of Anhalt
- Reign: 1586–1603
- Predecessor: Joachim Ernest
- Successor: none (principality partitioned)

Prince of Anhalt-Dessau
- Reign: 1603–1618
- Predecessor: none (principality (re-)created)
- Successor: John Casimir
- Born: 9 May 1567; Harzgerode, Principality of Anhalt-Dessau, Upper Saxon Circle, Holy Roman Empire
- Died: 24 May 1618 (aged 51); Dessau, Principality of Anhalt-Dessau, Upper Saxon Circle, Holy Roman Empire
- Spouse: Dorothea of Mansfeld-Arnstein (m. 1588; died 1594) Countess Palatine Dorothea of Simmern (m. 1595)
- Issue: Sophie Elisabeth, Duchess of Liegnitz; John Casimir, Prince of Anhalt-Dessau; Eleonore Dorothea, Duchess of Saxe-Weimar; Sibylle Christine, Countess of Hanau-Münzenberg and Hanau-Lichtenberg; George Aribert; Susanna Margarete of Hanau-Lichtenberg
Names
- German: Johann Georg
- House: House of Ascania
- Father: Joachim Ernest, Prince of Anhalt
- Mother: Agnes of Barby-Mühlingen

John George I of Anhalt-Dessau (9 May 1567 – 24 May 1618) was a German prince of the House of Ascania. From 1586 to 1603 he ruled the unified principality of Anhalt jointly with his brothers. After the partition of the principality in 1603, he ruled the principality of Anhalt-Dessau from 1603 to 1618.

John George was much appreciated by his subjects and considered learned abroad, particularly in the subjects of astrology and alchemy. He possessed a remarkable library with over 3000 volumes.

== Life ==
=== Early life ===
John George was born in Harzgerode on 9 May 1567 as the eldest son of Joachim Ernest, Prince of Anhalt-Zerbst, by his first wife Agnes, daughter of Wolfgang I, Count of Barby-Mühlingen.

In 1570, the death of John George's last surviving uncle, Bernhard VII, Prince of Anhalt-Zerbst, left John George's father as sole ruler of all the Anhalt states, which were finally unified for the first time since their first partition in 1252.

=== Joint prince of Anhalt ===
After the death of his father in 1586, John George inherited the unified principality of Anhalt jointly with his younger brother Christian I and his five half-brothers according to the family law of the House of Ascania, which mandated no division of territories among the heirs. Because his half-brothers were still minors at the time of their accession, John George acted as regent.

=== Prince of Anhalt-Dessau ===
In 1603 an agreement was drawn up between John George and his surviving brothers to divide the territories of the principality of Anhalt among them. John George received Anhalt-Dessau, as well as the Seniorat; nonetheless, he maintained a regency over all of the newly created principalities until 1606, when his brothers took over the government in their lands. As a ruler, he maintained Reformation policies in his state and vigorously pursued the abolition of the traditional customs and liturgy of the Roman Catholic Church.

=== The Fruitbearing Society ===
On 24 August 1617 at Schloss Hornstein (later Wilhelmsburg Castle) during the funeral of their sister Dorothea Maria, Duchess of Saxe-Weimar, John George and his younger brother Louis of Anhalt-Köthen created the Fruitbearing Society. The Prince of Köthen was appointed its first leader.

=== Death and succession ===
John George died in Dessau on 24 May 1618 at the age of 51. He was succeeded as Prince of Anhalt-Dessau by his eldest surviving son, John Casimir.

== Marriages and issue ==
=== Marriages ===
In Hedersleben on 22 February 1588 John George married Dorothea (b. 23 March 1561 – d. Dessau, 23 February 1594), daughter of John Albert VI, Count of Mansfeld-Arnstein. They had five children.

In Heidelberg on 21 February 1595 John George married for a second time to Dorothea (b. Kaiserslautern, 6 January 1581 – d. Sandersleben, 18 September 1631), the only surviving child of John Casimir of Simmern, third son of Frederick III, Elector Palatine. They had eleven children.

=== Issue ===
Name	Birth	Death	Notes
By Dorothea of Mansfeld-Arnstein
Sophie Elisabeth	Dessau, 10 February 1589	Liegnitz, 9 February 1622	married on 4 November 1614 to George Rudolph, Duke of Liegnitz
Anna Magdalena	Dessau, 29 March 1590	Eschwege, 24 October 1626	married on 14 June 1617 to Otto, Hereditary Prince of Hesse-Kassel
Anna Marie	Dessau, 4 May 1591	Dessau, 7 July 1637
Joachim Ernest, Hereditary Prince of Anhalt-Dessau	Dessau, 18 July 1592	Dessau, 28 May 1615
Christian	Dessau, 23 February 1594	Dessau, 13 April 1594
By Dorothea of Simmern
John Casimir, Prince of Anhalt-Dessau	Dessau, 7 September 1596	Dessau, 15 September 1660
Anna Elisabeth	Dessau, 5 April 1598	Tecklenburg, 20 April 1660	married on 2 January 1617 to William Henry, Count of Bentheim-Steinfurt, son of Arnold III, Count of Bentheim-Steinfurt-Tecklenburg-Limburg
Frederick Maurice	Dessau, 18 February 1600	Lyon, 25 August 1610
Eleonore Dorothea	Dessau, 16 February 1602	Weimar, 26 December 1664	married on 23 May 1625 to William, Duke of Saxe-Weimar
Sibylle Christine	Dessau, 11 July 1603	Hanau, 21 February 1686	married firstly on 26 December 1627 to Philip Maurice, Count of Hanau-Münzenberg, and secondly on 13 May 1647 to Frederick Casimir, Count of Hanau-Lichtenberg
Henry Waldemar	Dessau, 7 November 1604	Dessau, 25 September 1606
George Aribert	Dessau, 3 June 1606	Wörlitz, 14 November 1643
Kunigunde Juliane	Dessau, 17 February 1608	Rotenburg, 26 September 1683	married on 2 January 1642 to Herman IV, Landgrave of Hesse-Rotenburg
Susanna Margarete	Dessau, 23 August 1610	Babenhausen, 13 October 1663	married on 16 February 1651 to John Philip of Hanau-Lichtenberg
Johanna Dorothea	Dessau, 24 March 1612	Tecklenburg, 26 April 1695	married on 9 February 1636 to Maurice, Count of Bentheim-Tecklenburg (a nephew of her brother-in-law William Henry)
Eva Katharine	Dessau, 11 September 1613	Dessau, 15 December 1679

John George I of Anhalt-Dessau House of Ascania Born: 9 May 1567 Died: 24 May 1618
Preceded by Joachim Ernest	Prince of Anhalt with Christian I, Bernhard (until 1596), Augustus, Rudolph, John Ernest (until 1601) and Louis; 1586–1603	Succeeded by Principality partitioned in Anhalt-Dessau, Anhalt-Bernburg, Anhalt-Plötzkau, Anhalt-Zerbst and Anhalt-Köthen
Preceded by Principality (re-)created	Prince of Anhalt-Dessau; 1603–1618	Succeeded by John Casimir
