= Augustus, Elector of Saxony =

Elector of Saxony from 1553 to 1586

Augustus
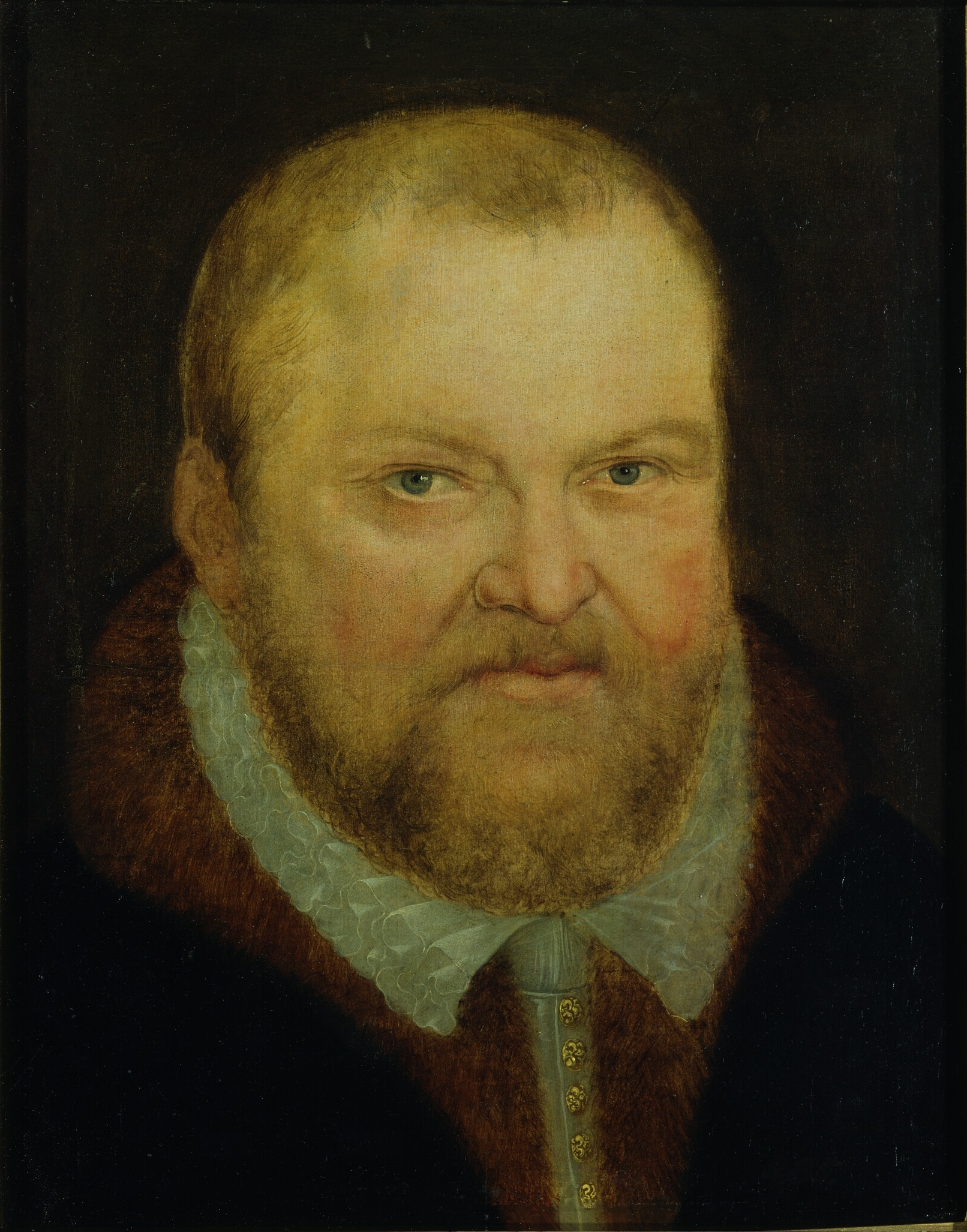

Elector of Saxony
- Reign: 9 July 1553 – 11 February 1586
- Predecessor: Maurice
- Successor: Christian I
- Born: 31 July 1526; Freiberg, Electorate of Saxony, Holy Roman Empire
- Died: 11 February 1586 (aged 59); Dresden, Electorate of Saxony, Holy Roman Empire
- Burial: Freiberg Cathedral
- Spouse: Anne of Denmark; Agnes Hedwig of Anhalt
- Issue among others...: Christian I, Elector of Saxony; Elisabeth, Countess Palatine of Simmern; Dorothea, Duchess of Brunswick-Lüneburg; Anna, Duchess of Saxe-Coburg-Eisenach
- House: Wettin (Albertine line)
- Father: Henry IV, Duke of Saxony
- Mother: Catherine of Mecklenburg
- Religion: Lutheran

Augustus (German: August; 31 July 1526 – 11 February 1586), who called himself Augustus and was popularly known as "Father August" in reference to his paternal rule, was Elector of Saxony from 1553 until his death. He belonged to the Albertine branch of the House of Wettin, succeeding his brother Maurice, who had fallen in the Battle of Sievershausen without leaving a male heir.

== First years ==
Augustus was born in Freiberg, the youngest child and third (but second surviving) son of Henry IV, Duke of Saxony, and Catherine of Mecklenburg. He consequently belonged to the Albertine branch of the House of Wettin. Brought up as a Lutheran, he received a good education and studied at Leipzig University.

When Duke Henry IV died in 1541, he decreed that his lands should be divided equally between his two sons; but as his bequest was contrary to the Albertine Law, it was not carried out, and the dukedom passed almost intact to his elder son, Maurice.

Augustus, however, remained on friendly terms with his brother, and to further his policy spent some time at the court of Ferdinand I, Holy Roman Emperor, in Vienna.

In 1544, Maurice secured the appointment of his brother as administrator of the bishopric of Merseburg; but Augustus was very extravagant and was soon compelled to return to the Saxon court at Dresden. Augustus supported his brother during the war of the Schmalkaldic League, and in the policy which culminated in the transfer of the Saxon electorate from John Frederick I, the head of the Ernestine branch of the Wettin family, to Maurice, head of the Albertine branch.

=== Marriage and children ===
In Torgau on 7 October 1548 Augustus was married to Anna, daughter of King Christian III of Denmark and Dorothea of Saxe-Lauenburg. They took up residence at Weissenfels. The couple had fifteen children:

1. John Henry (b. Weissenfels, 5 May 1550 – d. Weissenfels, 12 November 1550) died in infancy.
2. Eleonore (b. Wolkenstein, 2 May 1551 – d. Wolkenstein, 24 April 1553) died in early childhood.
3. Elisabeth (b. Wolkenstein, 18 October 1552 – d. imprisoned in Heidelberg, 2 April 1590), married on 4 June 1570 to Count Palatine Johann Casimir of Simmern; they were separated in 1589.
4. Alexander (b. Dresden, 21 February 1554 – d. Dresden, 8 October 1565), Hereditary Prince of Saxony, died in childhood.
5. Magnus (b. Dresden, 24 September 1555 – d. Dresden, 6 November 1558) died in early childhood.
6. Joachim (b. Dresden, 3 May 1557 – d. Dresden, 21 November 1557) died in infancy.
7. Hector (b. Dresden, 7 October 1558 – d. Dresden, 4 April 1560) died in early childhood.
8. Christian I (b. Dresden, 29 October 1560 – d. Dresden, 25 September 1591), successor of his father in the Electorship.
9. Marie (b. Torgau, 8 March 1562 – d. Torgau, 6 January 1566) died in early childhood.
10. Dorothea (b. Dresden, 4 October 1563 – d. Wolfenbüttel, 13 February 1587), married on 26 September 1585 to Duke Heinrich Julius of Brunswick-Wolfenbüttel.
11. Amalie (b. Dresden, 28 January 1565 – d. Dresden, 2 July 1565) died in infancy.
12. Anna (b. Dresden, 16 November 1567 – d. imprisoned in Veste Coburg, 27 January 1613), married on 16 January 1586 to Duke John Casimir, Duke of Saxe-Coburg-Eisenach; they divorced in 1593.
13. Augustus (b. Dresden, 23 October 1569 – d. Dresden, 12 February 1570) died in infancy.
14. Adolf (b. Stolpen, 8 August 1571 – d. Dresden, 12 March 1572) died in infancy.
15. Frederick (b. Annaberg, 18 June 1575 – d. Annaberg, 24 January 1577) died in early childhood.

Soon after his marriage, Augustus desired a more imposing establishment. The result was that Maurice made more generous provision for his brother, who acted as Regent of Saxony in 1552 during the absence of the elector. Augustus was on a visit to Denmark when by Maurice's death in July 1553 he became elector of Saxony.

== Elector of Saxony ==
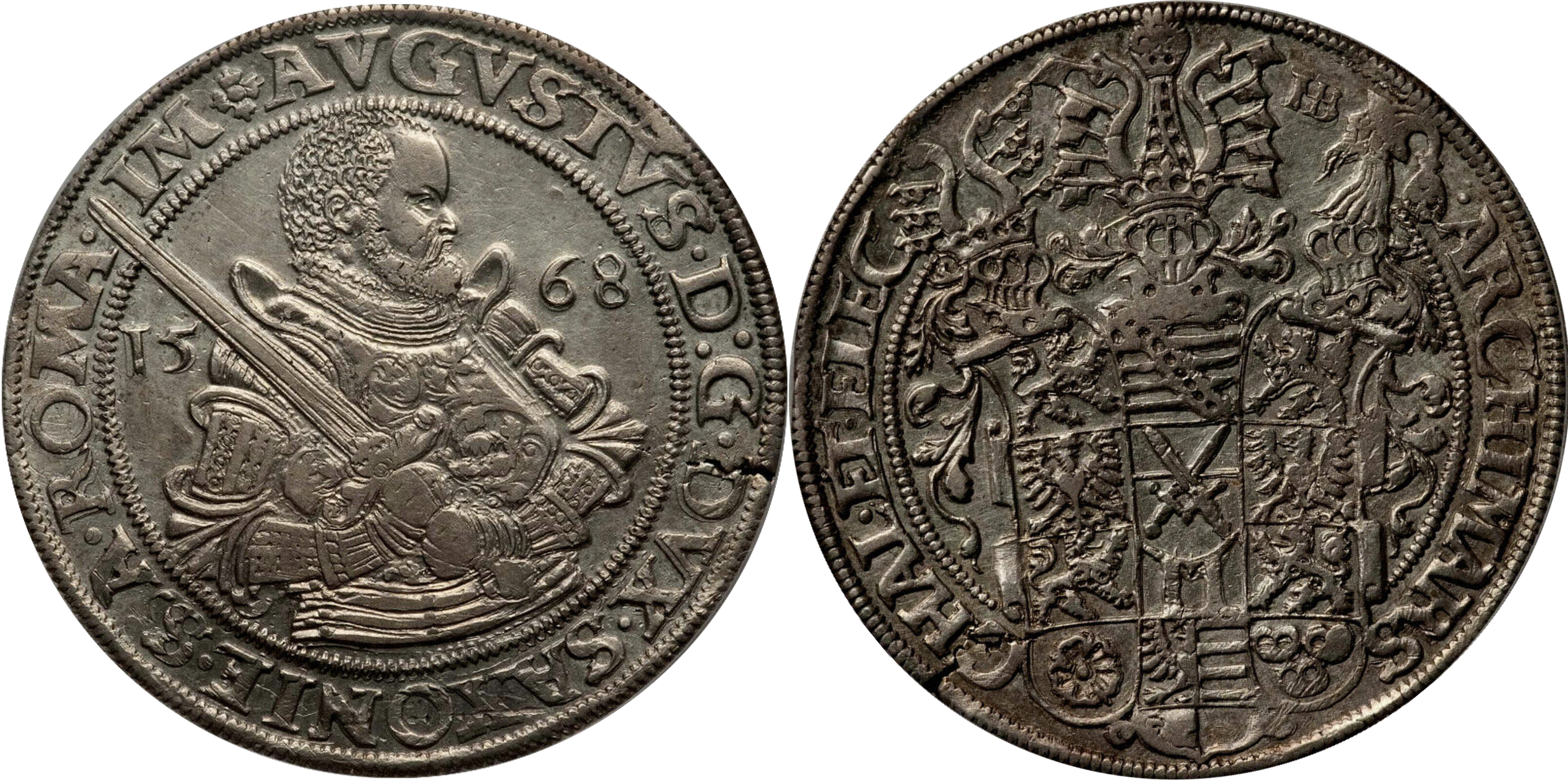
Augustus as depicted on a 1568 thaler, minted in Dresden

The first care of the new elector was to come to terms with John Frederick, and to strengthen his own hold upon the electoral position. This object was secured by a treaty made at Naumburg in February 1554, when, in return for the grant of Altenburg and other lands, John Frederick recognized Augustus as elector of Saxony.

The elector, however, was continually haunted by the fear that the Ernestines would attempt to deprive him of the coveted dignity, and his policy both in Saxony and the wider Holy Roman Empire was coloured by this fear. In imperial politics Augustus acted upon two main principles: to cultivate the friendship of the Habsburgs, and to maintain peace between the contending religious parties. To this policy may be traced his share in bringing about the religious Peace of Augsburg treaty in 1555, his tortuous conduct at the diet of Augsburg eleven years later, and his reluctance to break entirely with the Calvinists. His policy of religious peace was also promoted by the marriage he negotiated between his niece Anna and the then-Catholic Prince of Orange, at the time one of the chief Habsburg vassals in the Netherlands, in 1561.

On one occasion only did he waver in his allegiance to the Habsburgs. In 1568 a marriage was arranged between Johann Casimir, son of Frederick III, Elector Palatine, and Elisabeth, Augustus' own daughter. For a time it seemed possible that the Saxon elector would support his son-in-law in his attempts to aid the revolting inhabitants of the Spanish Netherlands. Augustus also entered into communication with the Huguenots; however, his aversion to foreign complications prevailed, and the incipient friendship with the elector Palatine soon gave way to serious dislike. Although a sturdy Lutheran, the elector hoped at one time to unite the Protestants. He continually urged them to consider the necessity of giving no cause of offence to their opponents, and he favoured the movement to get rid of the clause in the Peace of Augsburg concerning ecclesiastical reservation, which was offensive to many Protestants. His moderation, however, prevented him from joining those who were prepared to take strong measures to attain this end, and he refused to jeopardize the concessions already won.

== Religious policies ==
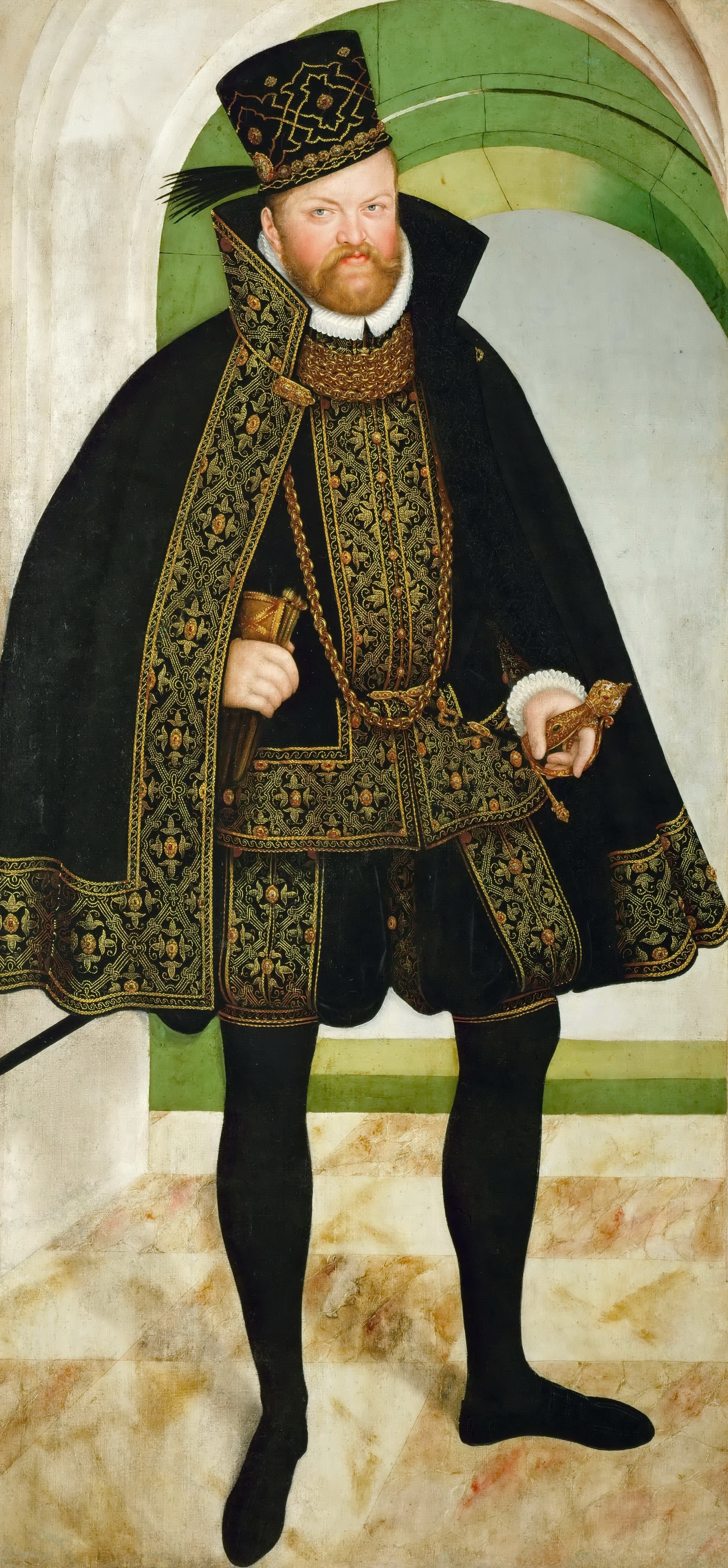
August von Sachsen (painting by Lucas Cranach the Younger, 1572, Stadt- und Bergbaumuseum in Freiberg).

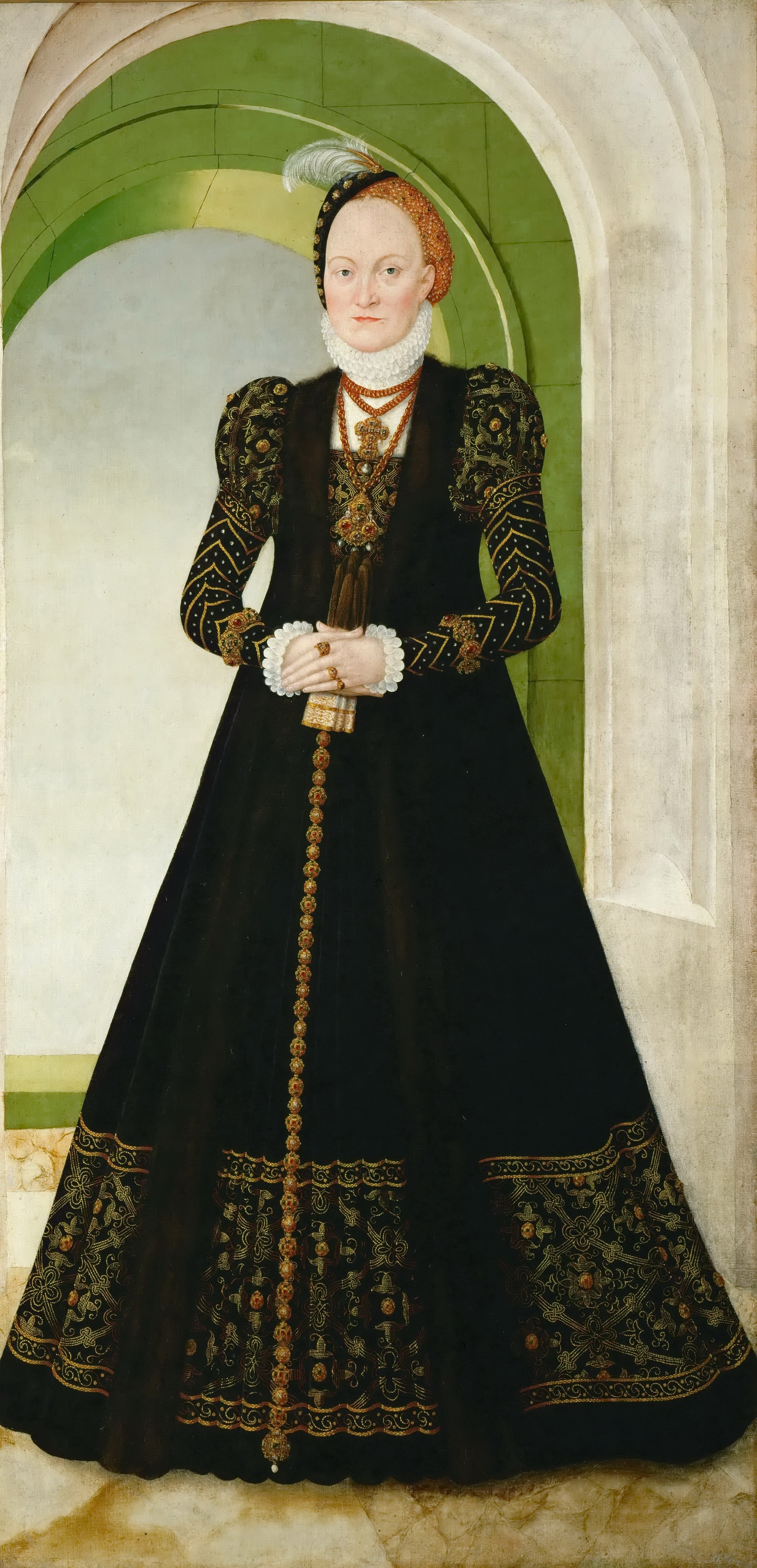
The other half of the painting: Anne of Denmark, Electress of Saxony.

The hostility between the Albertines and the Ernestines gave Augustus serious trouble. A preacher named Matthias Flacius held an influential position in ducal Saxony, and taught a form of Lutheranism different from that taught in the Electorate of Saxony. This breach was widened when Flacius began to make personal attacks on Augustus, to prophesy his speedy downfall, and to incite Duke John Frederick to make an effort to recover his rightful position. Associated with Flacius was a knight, Wilhelm von Grumbach, who, not satisfied with words only, made inroads into the Electorate of Saxony and sought the aid of foreign powers in his plan to depose Augustus. After some delay Grumbach and his protector, John Frederick, were placed under the imperial ban, and Augustus was entrusted with its execution. His campaign in 1567 was short and successful.

John Frederick surrendered, and passed his time in prison until his death in 1595; Grumbach was taken and executed; and the position of the elector was made quite secure. The form of Lutheranism taught in the Electorate of Saxony was that of Melanchthon, and many of its teachers and adherents, such as Caspar Peucer and Johann Stössel, afterwards called Crypto-Calvinists, were favoured by the elector.

The Crypto-Calvinists were confident that they would be able to bring Augustus over to their Calvinizing positions by convincing Augustus that they were in fact merely loyal Lutherans, when in fact they were working to introduce Calvinist views of the Lord's Supper, and the doctrine of predestination at the University of Wittenberg.

Augustus at first was deceived. Spurred on by his wife the matter reached a climax in 1574, when letters were discovered, which, while revealing a hope to bring over Augustus to Calvinism, cast some aspersions upon the elector and his wife. Augustus ordered the leaders of the Crypto-Calvinists to be seized, and they were tortured and imprisoned. He restored genuine Lutheranism to Saxony and began to work on a way to bring unity among Lutherans by commencing a process that would lead to the publication, in 1580, of the Lutheran Book of Concord. Augustus personally sponsored the publication of the Book of Concord, a book containing the various Lutheran Confessions of faith, which was signed by over 8,100 ministers and professors and nearly 30 territories, states and cities in Germany.

This strict form of Lutheranism was declared binding upon all the inhabitants of Saxony, and many persons were banished from the country. The change in Saxony, however, made no difference to the attitude of Augustus on imperial questions. In 1576 he opposed the proposal of the Protestant princes to make a grant for the War against the Ottoman Empire conditional upon the abolition of the clause concerning ecclesiastical reservation, and he continued to support the Habsburgs.

== Territorial expansion ==
Much of the elector's time was devoted to extending his territories. In 1573 he became guardian to the two sons of John William, duke of Saxe-Weimar, and in this capacity was able to add part of the County of Henneberg to the Electorate of Saxony. His command of money enabled him to take advantage of the poverty of his neighbours, and in this way he secured Vogtland and the County of Mansfeld. In 1555 he had appointed one of his nominees to the bishopric of Meissen, in 1561 he had secured the election of his son Alexander as bishop of Merseburg, and three years later as bishop of Naumburg; and when this prince died in 1565 these bishoprics came under the direct rule of Augustus.

== Second marriage and death ==
On 1 October 1585 the Electress Anna died. Three months later, on 3 January 1586, in the city of Dessau, Augustus married secondly with Agnes Hedwig, a daughter of Joachim Ernest, Prince of Anhalt. The bride was only 12 years of age; the groom, almost 60. August died one month after his new marriage, and was buried at Freiberg Cathedral. His only surviving son, Christian I, was his successor.

== Writing and collections ==
Augustus wrote a small work on agriculture entitled Künstlich Obstund Gartenbüchlein. He was famous for his various museum collections, including the finest collection of arms and weapons in Northern Europe, paintings, and an extensive collection of tools. In 1560 he founded the Dresden Kunstkammer, the predecessor of the present day State Collections. One of his possessions, a clockwork automaton called the Mechanical Galleon is now in the British Museum. This table decoration played music, told the time and showed Augustus and the other six electors parading before the Roman Emperor.

== Ancestors ==
Ancestors of Augustus, Elector of Saxony

16. Frederick I, Elector of Saxony (1370–1428)
8. Frederick II, Elector of Saxony (1412–1464)
17. Catherine of Brunswick-Lüneburg (1395–1442)
4. Duke Albert the Bold (1443–1500)
18. Ernest "the Iron" of Austria (1377–1424)
9. Margaret of Austria-Styria (1416–1486)
19. Cimburgis of Masovia (1394/97–1429)
2. Henry the Pious (1473–1541)
20. Victor of Kunštát and Poděbrady (1403–1427)
10. King George of Poděbrady (1420–1471)
21. Anna of Wartenberg (1403–1427)
5. Sidonie of Poděbrady (1449–1510)
22. Lord Smil of Sternberg (d. 1431)
11. Kunigunde of Sternberg (1425–1449)
23. Barbara of Pardubitz (d. 1433)
1. Augustus, Elector of Saxony
24. John IV, Duke of Mecklenburg (1370–1422)
12. Henry IV, Duke of Mecklenburg (1417–1477)
25. Catherine of Saxe-Lauenburg (d. 1448)
6. Magnus II, Duke of Mecklenburg (1441–1503)
26. Frederick I, Elector of Brandenburg (1371–1440)
13. Dorothea of Brandenburg (1420–1491)
27. Elisabeth of Bavaria (1383–1442)
3. Catherine of Mecklenburg (1487–1561)
28. Wartislaw IX, Duke of Pomerania (1400–1457)
14. Eric II, Duke of Pomerania (1425–1474)
29. Sophia of Saxe-Lauenburg (d. 1462)
7. Sophie of Pomerania (1460–1504)
30. Bogislav IX of Pomerania-Stolp (1407-1446)
15. Sophie of Pomerania-Stolp (1435-1497)
31. Maria of Masovia (1408-1454)

== Sources ==
- This cites:
  - C. W. Böttiger and T. Flathe, Geschichte Sachsens, Band ii. (Gotha, 1870)
  - M. Ritter, Deutsche Geschichte im Zeitalter der Gegenreformation, Band i. (Stuttgart, 1890)
  - R. Calinich, Kampf und Untergang des Melanchthonismus in Kursachsen (Leipzig, 1866)
  - J. Falke, Geschichte des Kurfürsten August in volkswirtschaftlicher Beziehung (Leipzig, 1868)
  - J. Janssen, Geschichte des Deutschen Volkes seit dem Ausgang des Mittelalters (Freiburg, 1885–1894)
  - W. Wenck, Kurfürst Moritz und Herzog August (Leipzig, 1874)
- Böttcher, Hans-Joachim (2018). Elisabeth von Sachsen und Johann Kasimir von der Pfalz: Ein Ehe- und Religionskonflikt [Elisabeth of Saxony and John Casimir of the Palatinate: A Marital and Religious Conflict] (in German). Dresden: Dresdner Buchverlag. ISBN 9783946906063.
- Groß, Reiner (2007). Die Wettiner. Stuttgart: Kohlhammer Verlag.

Augustus, Elector of Saxony House of Wettin Born: 31 July 1526 Died: 11 February 1586
Regnal titles
Preceded by Maurice	Elector of Saxony; 1553–1586	Succeeded by Christian I
