= John Casimir of the Palatinate-Simmern =

German prince (1543–1592)

John Casimir of Simmern
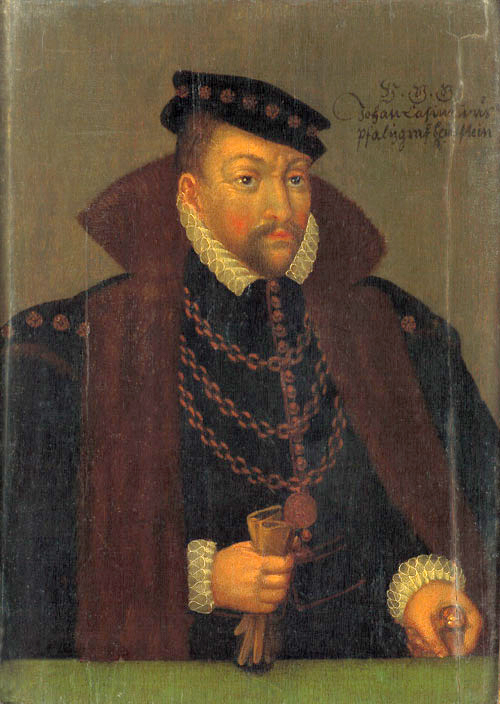
- John Casimir, ca. 1590

Duke of Pfalz-Lautern
- Reign: 1576 – 1592
- Predecessor: Frederick III as Elector Palatine
- Successor: Frederick IV as Elector Palatine
- Born: 7 March 1543; Simmern
- Died: 16 January 1592 (aged 48); Heidelberg
- Noble family: House of Wittelsbach
- Spouse: Elisabeth of Saxony
- Issue Detail: Countess Palatine Dorothea of Simmern
- Father: Frederick III, Elector Palatine
- Mother: Marie of Brandenburg-Kulmbach

John Casimir, Count Palatine of Simmern (German: Johann Casimir von Pfalz-Simmern) (7 March 1543 – 16 January [O.S. 6 January] 1592) was a German prince and a younger son of Frederick III, Elector Palatine. A firm Calvinist, he was a leader of mercenary troops in the religious wars of the time, including the Dutch Revolt. From 1583 to 1592, he acted as regent for his nephew, Elector Palatine Frederick IV.

== Career ==
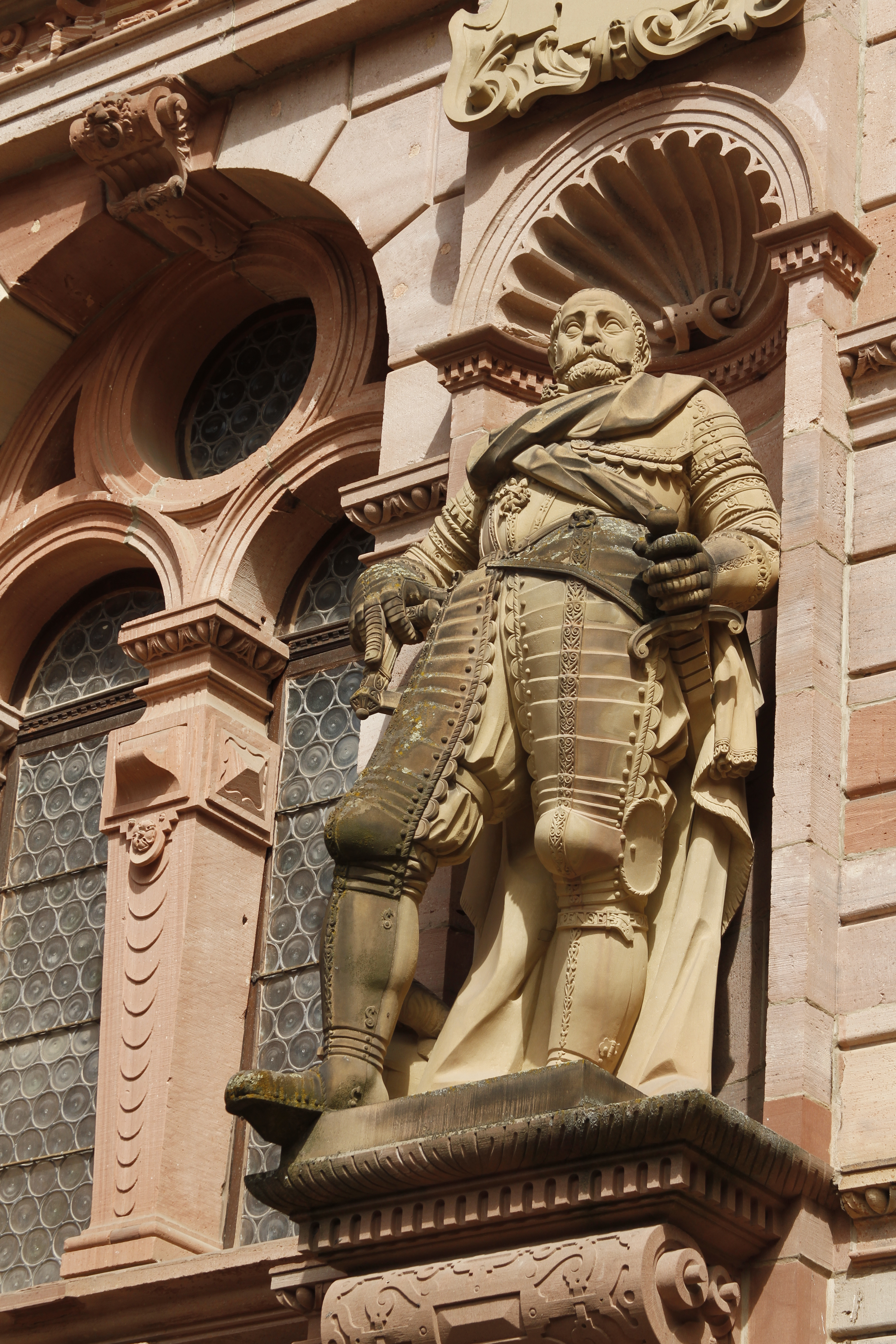
Statue of John Casimir in Heidelberg Castle

Count Palatine John Casimir was born in Simmern as the third son of Frederick III, Elector Palatine, and Marie of Brandenburg-Kulmbach, of the Simmern middle electoral line of the House of Wittelsbach. In 1564 John Casimir suggested himself as a bridegroom for Elizabeth I of England and sent her his portrait via the Scottish courtier Sir James Melville. Elizabeth, however, showed no interest in him.

On 26 November 1568 he was engaged to the 16-year-old Lutheran Elisabeth of Saxony, a daughter of Augustus, Elector of Saxony and his first wife Anne of Denmark. The wedding took place in Heidelberg on June 6, 1570. The marriage was political, as John Casimir wanted to link Calvinism to Saxony through the marriage. Their marriage turned out to be unhappy, and not only because of religious differences. John Casimir ordered his wife under house arrest accusing her of adultery. Elisabeth gave birth to six children, three of whom were stillborn; the other three were daughters. She died in prison on April 2, 1590.

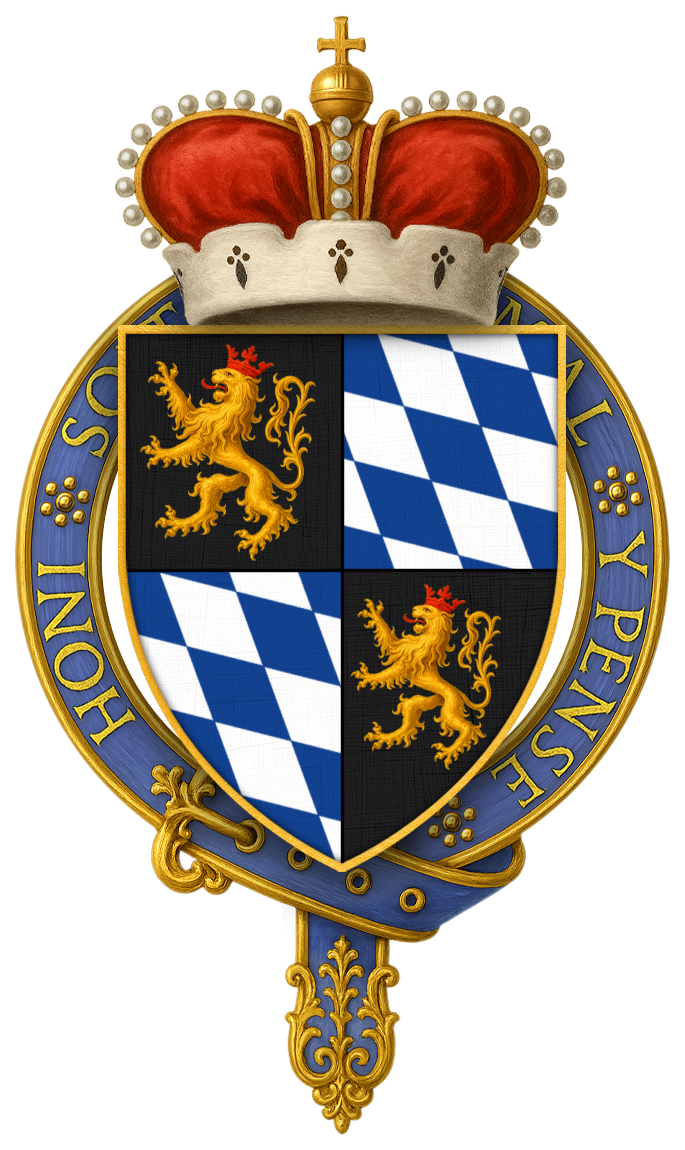
Coat of arms of John Casimir encircled by the Order of the Garter.

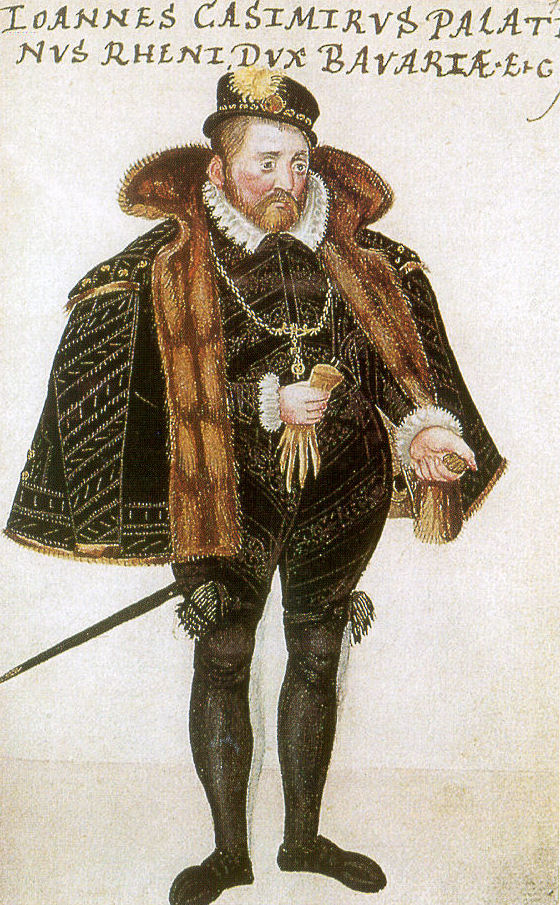
John Casimir as depicted in a contemporary reference work. The text reads "Ioannes Casimirus Palatinus Rheni Dux Bavariæ Etc."

From March 1571, Johann Casimir resided in Kaiserslautern for a decade. When his father died in 1576, he ordered in his will that the Palatinate was to remain Calvinist. His son, Louis VI, inherited the main part of the Palatinate, including Heidelberg, and John Casimir inherited a smaller portion, which became the independent Count Palatine of Lautern (essentially consisting of the city of Kaiserslautern and surrounding area). John Casimir's brother Ludwig, who had been secretly raised by his mother as a Lutheran, did not honor his father's wish and instead supported Lutheranism. Many professors of theology, including Zacharias Ursinus, left the Ruprecht Karl University of Heidelberg and were welcomed to Lautern by Johann Casimir who built the Collegium Casimirianum in Neustadt as a substitute university for them in 1578.

John Casimir was in regular contact with Robert Dudley, 1st Earl of Leicester and his nephew Sir Philip Sidney who, as agent for Elizabeth I, was sent to the continent to assist in the formation of a Protestant league. In 1576, John Casimir entered France leading four thousand troops. As a result of this campaign, he was made duc d’Étampes by Henry III of France for a few months, in 1576–1577. This was a theoretical position, as he never actually visited his French duchy.

He visited England in 1579 to seek the Queen's financial support for his campaigns on behalf of the United Provinces. In February 1579 the Earl of Leicester took him to Oxford and he was entertained for three weeks at the English court. He hunted deer in Hyde Park. When he left, the Queen gave him gold plate and the Earl of Leicester gave him gifts of hawks, hounds, and hunting equipment, the Earl of Pembroke sent a gold chain. From 1583 to 1592 Casimir acted as regent for his nephew Elector Frederick IV.

== Issue ==
With Elisabeth of Saxony:

1. unnamed son (15 September 1573)
2. Marie (b. July 26, 1576 – d. February 22, 1577).
3. Elisabeth (b. May 5, 1578 – d. October 27, 1580).
4. Dorothea (b. January 6, 1581 – d. September 18, 1631); married John George I, Prince of Anhalt-Dessau in 1595.
5. unnamed daughter (28 February 1584)
6. unnamed daughter (2 February 1585)

== Notes ==
German nobility
New title partitioned from the Electorate of the Palatinate	Count Palatine of Lautern; 1576–1592	Extinct returned to the Electorate of the Palatinate
