= Johann Ludwig II of Anhalt-Zerbst =

German prince

Johann Ludwig II
- Prince of Anhalt-Dornburg; Prince of Anhalt-Zerbst (after 1742)
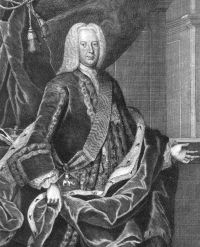
- Reign: 1704–1746
- Born: 23 June 1688; Dornburg, Principality of Anhalt-Dornburg
- Died: 5 November 1746 (aged 58); Zerbst
- House: House of Ascania
- Father: John Louis I
- Mother: Christine Eleonore of Zeutsch

Johann Ludwig II, Prince of Anhalt-Zerbst (23 June 1688, in Dornburg – 5 November 1746, in Zerbst), was a German prince of the House of Ascania and ruler of the principality of Anhalt-Dornburg. After 1742 he became ruler over the principality of Anhalt-Zerbst.

He was the eldest son of John Louis I, Prince of Anhalt-Dornburg, by his wife Christine Eleonore of Zeutsch.

== Life ==
He succeeded his father as prince of Anhalt-Dornburg in 1704 and ruled jointly with his brothers John Augustus (died 1709), Christian Augustus, Christian Louis (died 1710) and John Frederick (died 1742), but he had the Senoriat over all of them as first-born.

In 1720, he was appointed Oberlanddrostes of Jever and remained there for the next twenty-two years; during this time, he ordered the building of the Stadtkirche in Jever (which was finally inaugurated in 1736). After the death in 1742 of his cousin Prince John Augustus of Anhalt-Zerbst without heirs, he and his only surviving brother, Christian Augustus, took over the rule of the entire principality of Anhalt-Zerbst. In order to administer the principality, he had to return to Zerbst.

Johann Ludwig never married and died after only four years of rule. On his death, he was succeeded by his brother and co-ruler.

| Preceded by John Louis I | Prince of Anhalt-Dornburg; 1704 – 1746; With: John Augustus 1704–1709; Christian Augustus and Christian Louis 1704–1710; John Frederick 1704–1742 | Succeeded by Christian Augustus |
| Preceded by John Augustus | Prince of Anhalt-Zerbst; 1742 – 1746; With: Christian Augustus | Succeeded by Christian Augustus |
