= Prince Waldemar =

Prince Waldemar or Valdemar may refer to:

== Anhalt-Köthen, a German principality ==
- Waldemar I, Prince of Anhalt-Zerbst (died 1368)
- Waldemar II, Prince of Anhalt-Zerbst (died 1371)
- Waldemar III, Prince of Anhalt-Zerbst (died 1391)
- Waldemar V, Prince of Anhalt-Köthen (died 1436)
- Waldemar VI, Prince of Anhalt-Köthen (1450–1508)

== Other places ==
- Waldemar IV, Prince of Anhalt-Dessau (died after 22 July 1417)
- Prince Valdemar of Denmark (1858–1939)
- Prince Waldemar of Prussia (disambiguation), several people
- Woldemar, Prince of Lippe (1824–1895)
