= Bengt Birgersson =

Duke of Finland from 1284 to 1291

- Duke of Finland; Bishop of Linköping
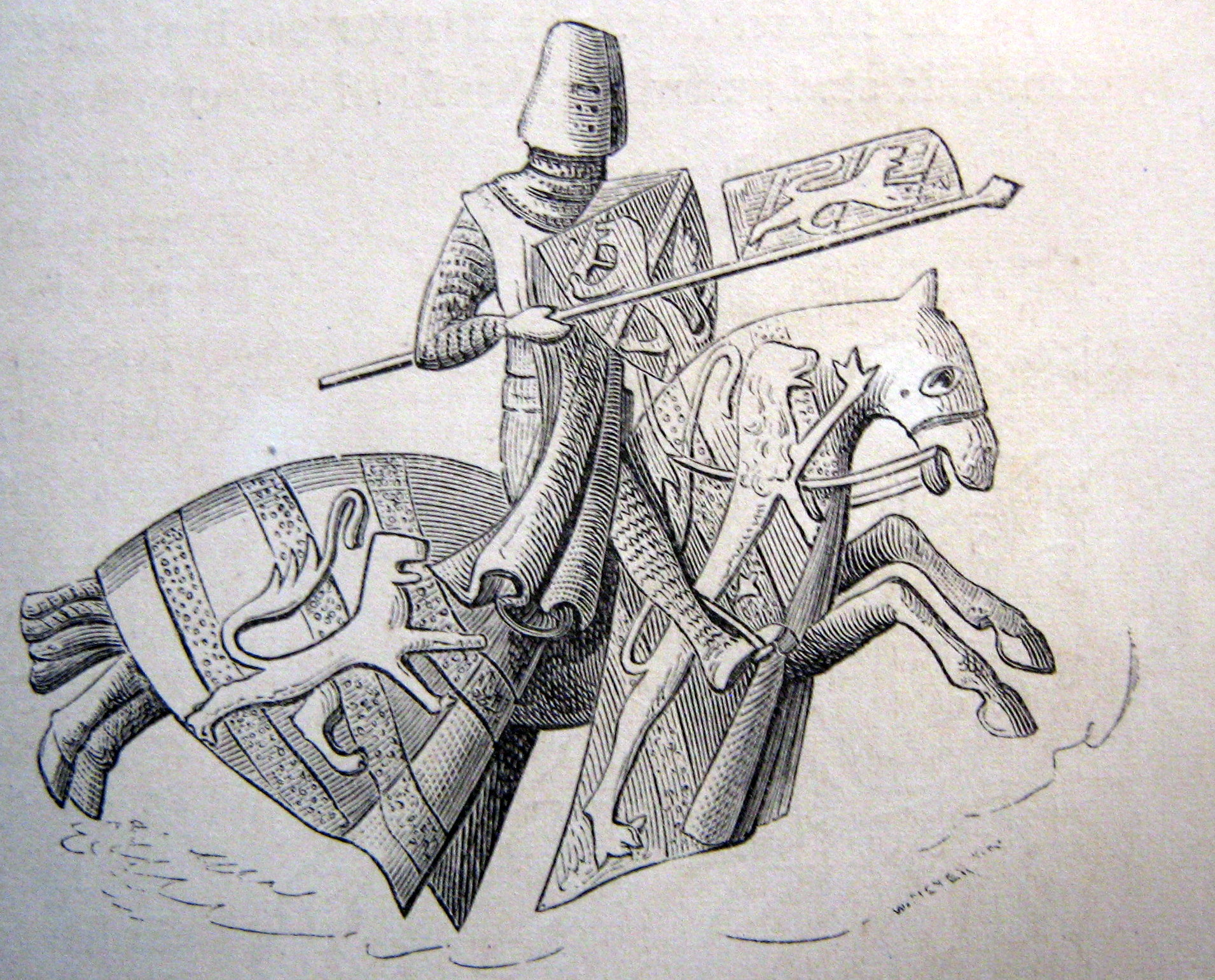
- Born: 1254
- Died: 25 May 1291 (aged 36–37)
- Father: Birger Jarl
- Mother: Ingeborg Eriksdotter of Sweden
- Religion: Roman Catholicism

Bengt Birgersson (1254 – 25 May 1291) was the youngest son of Birger Jarl. He embarked on an ecclesiastical career, becoming the Archdeacon of Linköping in 1273, the Canon of Uppsala in 1275, and the Bishop of Linköping in 1286. When open war broke out between his brothers, King Valdemar and Duke Magnus, Bengt sided with Magnus. After Magnus became King of Sweden in 1275, Bengt served as his chancellor. In 1284, he was granted the title of Duke of Finland.

== Biography ==
Bengt Birgersson was a member of the House of Bjälbo (Folkungaätten). He was the youngest son of Birger Magnusson, better known as Birger Jarl, de facto ruler of Sweden from 1250 to 1266. His mother was Princess Ingeborg of Sweden, daughter of King Erik Knutsson of Sweden and sister of King Erik Eriksson.

Bengt was designated for an ecclesiastical career from an early age. He received his education at Linköping Cathedral, where he became an archdeacon already in 1269 or 1273, and the Canon of Uppsala in 1275. According to Magnúss saga lagabœtis, he was being considered for the position of an archbishop in 1273, but was not selected.

Birger Jarl died in 1266, after which Bengt's eldest brother Valdemar assumed full royal authority. Tensions soon arose between Valdemar and his younger brothers, Erik and Duke Magnus (Ladulås), who resented Valdemar's power. These disputes escalated into armed rebellion in the early 1270s. According to tradition, Bengt initially tried to mediate between his brothers, but when this proved impossible, he aligned himself with Magnus, as did most of the clergy. After Magnus deposed Valdemar and was elected king, Bengt briefly served as his chancellor.

In 1284, some time after the death of his brother Erik, and during the reign of Magnus, he was made Duke of Finland. He was the first known holder of that title. It is believed that the title did not include any fief. He is not known to have ever visited Finland, although he may have had responsibilities there related to the defence of Sweden's eastern borderlands.

In 1286 Bengt was elected Bishop of Linköping. As bishop, Bengt focused on the administration and development of his diocese. He oversaw the continued construction of the Linköping Cathedral, secured renewed royal and papal support for its funding, and maintained relations with several monasteries, including Skänninge, Nydala, and the Franciscan friary in Linköping. He consecrated the church of Vreta Abbey in 1289. His wills from 1287 and 1289 record donations to cathedrals, monasteries, and hospitals across the realm, including Åbo (Turku) Cathedral in Finland, and provisions for new canonries and other ecclesiastical purposes.

When King Magnus died in 1290, Bengt assumed a role in the regency of the underage King Birger. However, he died from the plague just a half year later. He is buried in Linköping Catheral.

Preceded by New creation	Duke of Finland; 1284–1291	Succeeded by Valdemar Magnusson
