= Duke of Swealand =

Duke of Swealand (Svealand) or Duchess of Swealand may refer to:

1. Prince Magnus, Duke of Swealand from about 1254 until 1275 (also of Södermanland), then king of Sweden 1275–1290
2. Prince Eric (son of Birger Jarl), Duke of Swealand 1275 (also of Småland from about 1254 until 1275)
3. Prince Eric, Duke of Swealand 1284–1310 (also 1310–1318 of Södermanland, West Gothland, Dalsland, Värmland and North Halland)
4. Ingeborg of Norway, Duchess of Swealand 1318–1321 in her own right (previous Prince Eric's widow)
