= John Louis I of Anhalt-Dornburg =

German prince

John Louis I
- Prince of Anhalt-Dornburg
- Born: 4 May 1656; Zerbst, Principality of Anhalt-Zerbst
- Died: 1 November 1704 (aged 48); Dornburg
- Spouse: Christine Eleonore of Zeutsch (m. 1687; died 1699)
- Issue: Johann Ludwig II, Prince of Anhalt-Zerbst; Christian August, Prince of Anhalt-Zerbst
- House: Ascania
- Father: John VI, Prince of Anhalt-Zerbst
- Mother: Sophie Augusta of Holstein-Gottorp

John Louis I, Prince of Anhalt-Dornburg (4 May 1656, in Zerbst – 1 November 1704, in Dornburg), was a German prince of the House of Ascania and ruler of the principality of Anhalt-Dornburg, as well as a grandfather of Catherine the Great.

He was the sixth (but fourth surviving) son of John VI, Prince of Anhalt-Zerbst, by his wife Sophie Auguste, daughter of Frederick III, Duke of Schleswig-Holstein-Gottorp.

== Life ==
After the death of his father in 1667, John Louis inherited the town of Dornburg with the title of prince. Because he was still a minor, his mother, the Dowager Princess Sophie Auguste, acted as regent on behalf of him and his brothers.

In 1672, the sixteen-year-old John Louis began his Grand Tour with his older brother Karl William in Regensburg. There they reunited with their middle brothers Anthony Günther and John Adolph, who had just returned from a journey to Italy. The four princes became honored guests of the Emperor Leopold I in Vienna, and were allowed to kiss his hand. During his stay at the Imperial court, John Louis and his brothers took the opportunity to make contacts and extend their knowledge. Afterwards the young brothers returned to Zerbst. They enjoyed their time together very much, and it created a deep and lifelong bond between them.

Another journey already planned for John Louis in 1674 was frustrated. He was appointed to go to Italy with the Hereditary Prince Augustus Frederick, eldest son and heir of Anthony Ulrich, Duke of Brunswick-Wolfenbüttel; although all necessary preparations were ready, the trip had to be cancelled because John Louis broke his leg. During the next three years he suffered severe pain. The physicians were unable to set his bones correctly and only gave him analgesics. But finally, the prince recovered fully. In the meantime, his brother Karl William had taken over the government of Anhalt-Zerbst and the custody of the brothers and sister who were still minors.

During his stay in Vienna John Louis also made trips to Hungary, which belonged to the Habsburg Empire. He inspected the fortresses of Raab (now Győr, north-west Hungary) and Comorra (now Komárom, on the border with Slovakia). From Vienna he traveled via Salzburg and Tyrol to Venice and Rome. At the Vatican, he spoke with several cardinals and other church dignitaries at the papal court. He also had several audiences with Pope Innocent XI. The following year, in 1678, John Louis travelled further south and visited Naples, Sicily, and Malta; there, he was chosen as Grand Master of the Order of St. John (Johanniterordens). In November 1678 he finally made the return journey home. He went by boat from Malta to Livorno (Tuscany) on the west coast of Italy and stopped in Florence. He spent some time at the Florentine court of Grand Duke Cosimo III and met the other members of the grand ducal family. During this time he was highly honored; John Louis then moved again to Venice. From there he crossed Italy to the Mediterranean and stayed in the cities of Mantua, Modena, Parma, and Genoa. From Genoa, he traveled further and visited the fortress of Casale in Monferrato and Turin. In the latter city he met Queen Marie-Thérèse of France, wife of King Louis XIV, who was extremely polite and accommodating to him.

John Louis spent two years in Italy, then went back to Zerbst. His trip was extensive and educational in all respects. His older brother Karl William received him enthusiastically upon his return. But in early 1681, the year when he began construction on Schloss Zerbst, he started traveling again. He visited the Netherlands and France, but after two years, John Louis returned home.

John Louis's military career was a minor activity for him. During his trips the fortresses he visited interested him only marginally. Nevertheless, in 1684 he joined the imperial army and held the rank of captain. Perhaps it was financial considerations that forced him to do so. He served in a regiment under the command of General von Scharfenberg and supervised an unsuccessful siege of a Hungarian fortress. The campaign was a disaster, but John Louis did acquire experience. Only two years later, in 1686, the army was able to take the fortress. John Louis's military career ended there, and he returned to the civilian life. Back home, he began to build his Schloss in Dornburg.

== Marriage and issue ==
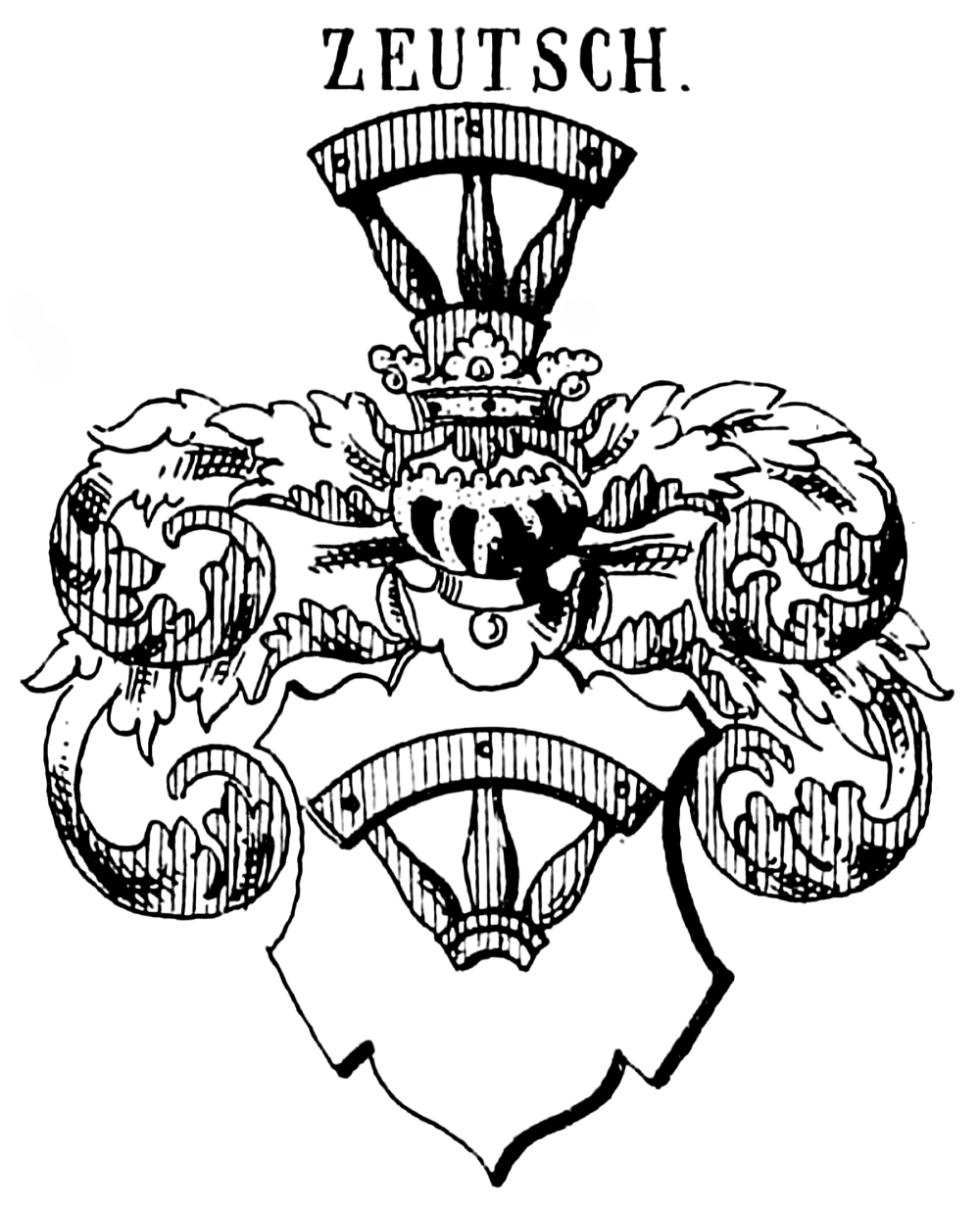
Coat of arms of the Zeutsch family

In Halle on 23 July 1687, John Louis married Christine Eleonore of Zeutsch (b. Hedersleben near Eisleben, 5 June 1666 – d. Dornburg, 17 May 1699), of an old, but minor Thuringian noble family. The circumstances of their courtship are not known. However, it is certain that it was not a political marriage, since it was clearly morganatic. They had seven children:

- John Louis II, Prince of Anhalt-Dornburg, later Anhalt-Zerbst (b. Dornburg, 23 June 1688 – d. Zerbst, 5 November 1746).
- John Augustus, Prince of Anhalt-Dornburg (b. Dornburg, 31 December 1689 – d. Exiles, Dauphiné, 22 August 1709).
- Christian Augustus, Prince of Anhalt-Dornburg, later Anhalt-Zerbst (b. Dornburg, 29 November 1690 – d. Zerbst, 16 March 1747), father of Catherine the Great.
- Christian Louis, Prince of Anhalt-Dornburg (b. Dornburg, 5 November 1691 – killed in action at Aire, Flanders, 20 October 1710).
- Sophie Christiane (b. Dornburg, 16 December 1692 – d. Zerbst, 3 May 1747).
- Eleonore Auguste (b. Dornburg, 13 May 1694 – d. Dornburg, 11 June 1704).
- John Frederick, Prince of Anhalt-Dornburg (b. Dornburg, 14 July 1695 – d. Schaffhausen, 11 May 1742), married to Cajetana of Sperling (d. Schaffhausen, 17 December 1742), a childless union.

When a family compact was submitted to the Emperor for confirmation in 1689, John Louis obtained from the Emperor the insertion of a clause protecting the rights of his children as born of a legitimate and lawful marriage. In 1693 Karl Frederick, the younger son of John Louis's eldest brother, died, leaving only one sibling, the later Prince John Augustus; John Louis's next two older brothers were either unmarried or without male heirs, which made the possibility that the Zerbst inheritance would pass to his line more likely. Consequently, he took further steps to insure the succession for his children, and on 7 January 1698 secured an Imperial Decree making the children of his marriage princes and princesses of Anhalt. Indeed, they were considered dynastic, and at the death without heirs of Prince John Augustus in 1742, the surviving sons of John Louis succeeded him.

John Louis I of Anhalt-Dornburg House of Ascania Born: 4 May 1656 Died: 1 November 1704
Preceded by John VI	Prince of Anhalt-Dornburg; 1667–1704	Succeeded by John Louis II; John Augustus; Christian Augustus; Christian Louis; John Frederick
