= Ingeborg of Sweden =

Ingeborg of Sweden may refer to:

- Ingeborg Eriksdotter of Sweden, Swedish princess around 1212
- Ingeborg Birgersdotter of Bjelbo, Swedish princess around 1253, married John I, Duke of Saxony
- Ingeborg of Sweden (1263–1292), Swedish princess 1263, daughter of King Waldemar
- Ingeborg Magnusdotter of Sweden, Swedish princess 1277
- Ingeborg of Norway, Swedish princess consort and duchess 1312
- Ingeborg Eriksdottir of Norway, Swedish princess consort and duchess 1312
- Ingeborg Knutsdotter, Swedish princess consort 14th century, wife of Erik Valdemarsson the Elder
- Princess Ingeborg of Denmark, Swedish princess consort and duchess 1897

== See also ==
- Ingeborg
