= Albert III =

Albert III may refer to:

- Albert III of Namur (1048–1102)
- Albert III of Habsburg (died 1199)
- Albert III of Brandenburg-Salzwedel (c. 1250–1300)
- Albert III of Saxe-Lauenburg (1281–1308)
- Albert III of Anhalt-Zerbst (died 1359)
- Albert III of Gorizia (died 1374)
- Albert III of Mecklenburg (c. 1338 – 1412)
- Albert III of Austria (1349–1395)
- Albert III of Saxe-Wittenberg (1375/1380–1422)
- Albrecht III Achilles, Elector of Brandenburg (1414–1486)
- Albert III of Bavaria (1438–1460)
- Albert III of Saxony (1443–1500)
