= Eric, Duke of Småland =

Eric, Duke of Småland (Swedish: Hertig Erik av Småland) may refer to:

- Eric Birgersson (c. 1250 – 1275), son of Princess Ingeborg and Birger Jarl
- Eric XIV (1533–1577), King of Sweden from 1560 to 1569
