= Anna Leuhusen =

Abbess of St. Clare's Priory in Stockholm

Anna Rheinholdsdotter Leuhusen
- Born: Unknown
- Died: Circa 1554
- Known for: Abbess of St. Clare's Priory, Stockholm
- Family: Reinhold Leuhusen (father), Martin Leuhusen (brother), Gregorius Holst (brother-in-law)

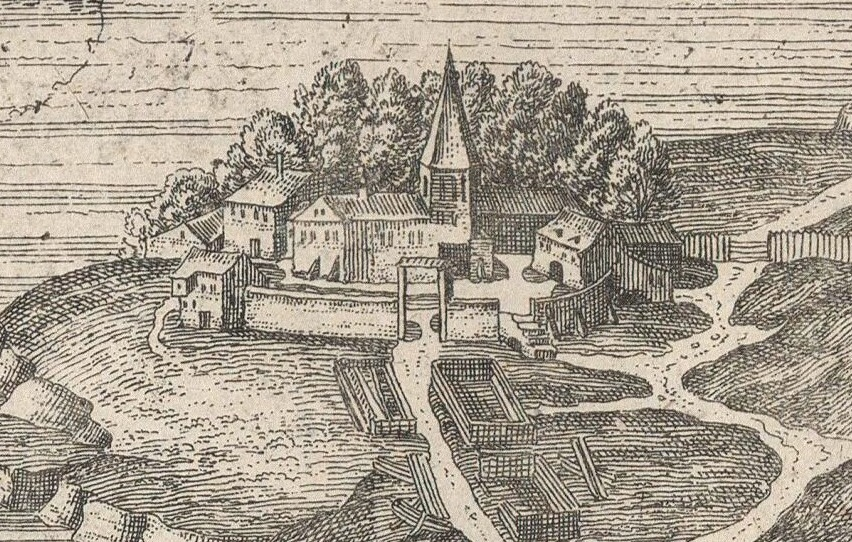
St. Clare's Priory, Stockholm Blodbadsplanschen 1524

Anna Reinholdsdotter Leuhusen (died c. 1554), was the abbess of St. Clare's Priory in Stockholm. She became known for her involvement in the Swedish War of Liberation between Sweden and Denmark in the 1520s.

== Background ==
Anna Leuhusen was born the child of Reinhold Leuhusen, merchant in Stockholm, and the sister of Martin Leuhusen, who is listed as a member of the city council of 1521; Martin Leuhusen was a fervent Catholic who did not convert until 1536. Her sister was married to the Danish colonel Gregorius Holst. The year of her birth is unknown. Anna Leuhusen entered St Clare's Priory as a member of the order of Saint Clare of Assisi. She was appointed abbess sometime before 1508: in that year in her capacity as abbess she appealed to the city for economic assistance.

== Actions during the war ==
In the early 16th century Sweden and Denmark, formally united through the Kalmar Union, were involved in various hostilities which eventually led to the Swedish War of Liberation. In 1520, the city of Stockholm was besieged and taken by the Danes after the defeat of Christina Gyllenstierna. Soon after, however, the rest of Sweden rose in rebellion and in 1522, the city was besieged by the Swedes under Gustav Vasa. During the siege, the St. Clare's Priory was used as an escape channel by people who wished to join the Swedes outside the city, both merchants and courtiers.

Leuhusen was a Danish loyalist and, according to the legend, responsible for betraying several of these people. During the day, she signalled by hanging a white cloth out of the window and, during the night, a lamp to the part of the convent facing the city, as a sign to the Danes that there were refugees in the building. When they left the convent on their way outside the city, they were taken by the Danes and executed for treason. This was performed in collaboration with her brother-in-law, the Danish loyalist mayor of Stockholm.

== Later life ==
In June 1523, Stockholm was retaken by the Swedes and made capital of the independent Kingdom of Sweden. In 1525, Elin Thomasdotter is noted to have replaced Anna Leuhusen as abbess. St. Clare's Priory was one of the first religious houses to be dissolved during the Swedish Reformation in 1527. This has been attributed to the acts of Leuhusen during the war, for which the king felt vengeful. Former abbess Anna Leuhusen and the rest of the nuns were allowed to settle in the dissolved Greyfriars, the former Franciscan friary, left empty by the dispossessed friars, where the nuns worked as nurses for the rest of their lives.

Anna Leuhusen is known to have kept one of the convent's most treasured possessions. When the abbey was founded in 1288, Princess Richenza of Sweden had entered it, and became its abbess in 1335. Richenza possessed a golden chain, which was subsequently used by the abbesses for centuries. Leuhusen kept this chain when the abbey was dissolved and gave it to her family.

Leuhusen was still alive in 1550. She is believed to have died around 1554.

== See also ==
- Brita Tott
- Magdalena Rudenschöld

== Sources ==
- Anteckningar om svenska qvinnor
- Svenska Familj-Journalen / Band 14, årgång 1875
- https://web.archive.org/web/20070218214012/http://histvarld.historiska.se/histvarld/sok/artikel.asp?id=21016
- http://fornvannen.se/pdf/1950talet/1958_047.pdf
- Martin Berntson. Klostren och reformationen. Upplösningen av kloster och konvent i Sverige 1523–1596. Malmö 2003.
- Lisbet Scheutz (2001 (2003) nuytgåva). Berömda och glömda stockholmskvinnor: sju stadsvandringar: 155 kvinnoporträtt. (Famous and forgotten women of Stockholm: seven tours: 155 female profiles) Stockholm: MBM. ISBN 91-973725-3-6 Libris 8392583
