= Duchess of Sweden =

Duchess of Sweden may refer to:

- Ingeborg, Princess of Sweden, Duchess of Sweden 1248–1254, it is unknown whether this was a primary title in its own right or adopted as consort of Birger Jarl
- Matilda of Holstein, Duchess of Sweden 1261–1288 as second consort and widow of Birger Jarl
