= Eric of Swealand =

Eric, Duke of Swealand (Swedish: Hertig Erik av Svealand) may refer to:

- Eric Birgersson (c. 1250 – 1275), son of Princess Ingeborg and Birger Jarl
- Eric Magnusson (duke) (c. 1282 – 1318), a Swedish prince and the father of King Magnus Eriksson
