= Waldemar I of Anhalt-Zerbst =

German prince

Waldemar I, Prince of Anhalt-Zerbst (died 7 January 1368) was a German prince of the House of Ascania and ruler of the principality of Anhalt-Zerbst.

He was the youngest son of Albert I, Prince of Anhalt-Zerbst, by his second wife Agnes, daughter of Conrad, Margrave of Brandenburg-Stendal.

== Life ==
After the death of his father in 1316, the young Waldemar and his older brother Albert II were put under the custody of their maternal uncle Waldemar, Margrave of Brandenburg-Stendal. When both brothers reached adulthood, they ruled the principality of Anhalt-Zerbst jointly. Waldemar made his residence in Dessau and Albert in Zerbst or Köthen.

In 1359 Waldemar's nephew Albert III was also made co-ruler by his father Albert II, but he soon died. Three years later (in 1362), Albert II died and Waldemar became co-ruler with his youngest nephew John II.

Six years later, Waldemar died, leaving his only son Waldemar II as the new co-ruler with John II.

== Marriages and Issue ==
On 22 June 1344 Waldemar married Elisabeth (d. aft. 30 May 1351), daughter of Rudolf I, Elector of Saxony, and Duke of Saxe-Wittemberg. Her paternal grandmother Agnes of Habsburg was a daughter of Rudolph I, Holy Roman Emperor. The spouses were distantly related: Elisabeth's great-grandfather Albert I, Duke of Saxony, was a brother of Henry I, Count of Anhalt, Waldemar's great-great-grandfather. They had six children:

1. Waldemar II, Prince of Anhalt-Zerbst (d. bef. 24 August 1371).
2. Beate (d. ca. 1379), a nun at Coswig (1375).
3. Sophie (d. aft. 6 January 1412), a nun at Coswig (1375).
4. Agnes (d. aft. 1375), a nun at Coswig (1375).
5. Judith (d. aft. 1375), a nun at Coswig (1375).
6. (?) Gertrude (d. ca. 1371).

In 1365 Waldemar married for a second time to Beatrice (d. 1387), legitimized daughter of Obizzo III d'Este, Lord of Ferrara and Modena by his second wife and former mistress Lippa Ariosto. Their union was childless.

Waldemar I of Anhalt-Zerbst House of Ascania Died: 7 January 1368
Regnal titles
Preceded by Albert II	Princes of Anhalt-Zerbst; 1316–1368 with Albert II (1316–1362); John II (1362–1382)	Succeeded by Waldemar II and John II
