= Christian Augustus, Prince of Anhalt-Zerbst =

Christian Augustus
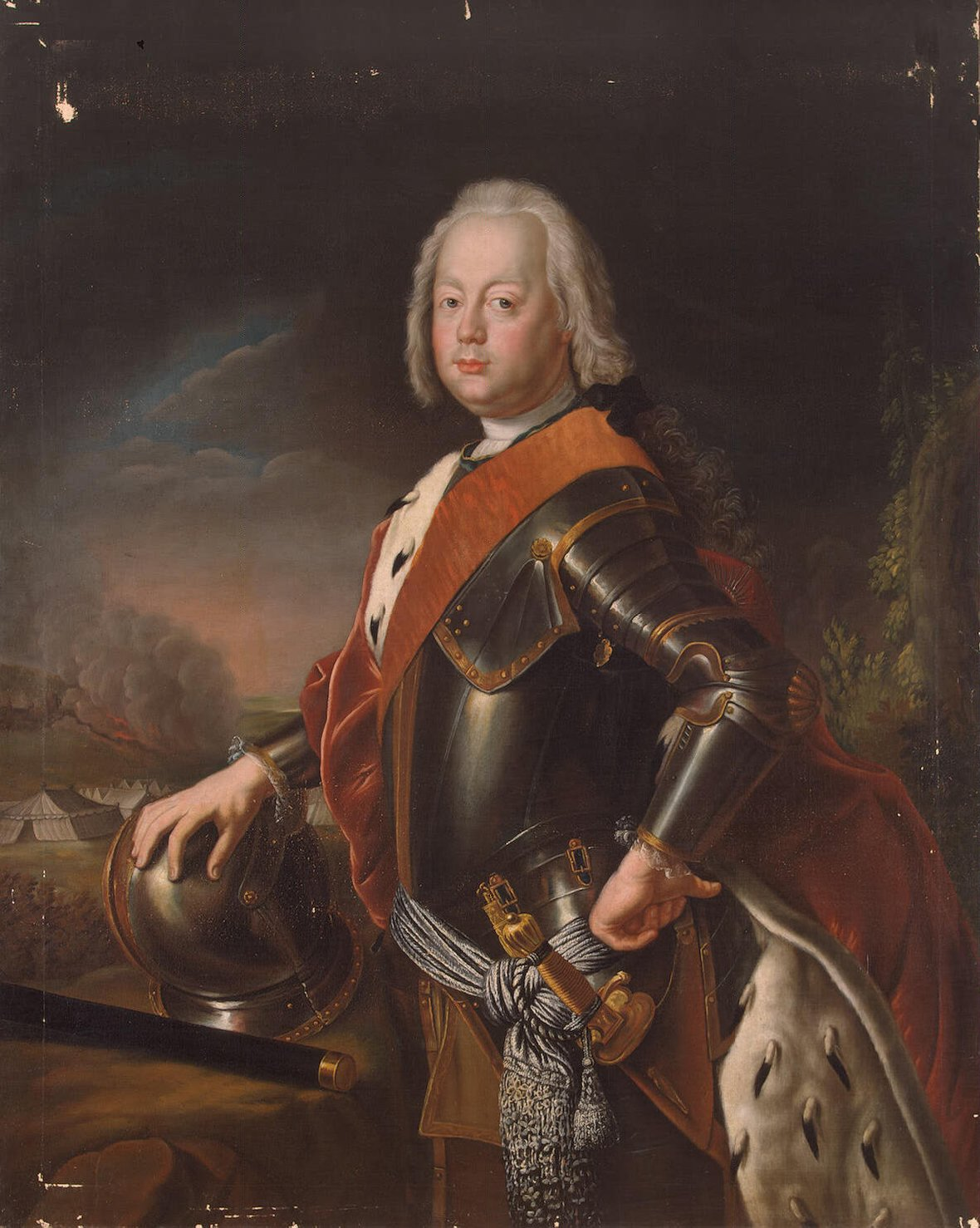
- Portrait of Christian August by Antoin Pesne, 1725

Prince of Anhalt-Zerbst
- Reign: 7 November 1742 – 16 March 1747
- Predecessor: John Augustus
- Successor: Frederick Augustus
- Co-monarch: John Louis II
- Born: 29 November 1690; Dornburg, Principality of Anhalt-Dornburg, Holy Roman Empire
- Died: 16 March 1747 (aged 56); Zerbst, Principality of Anhalt-Zerbst, Holy Roman Empire
- Spouse: Joanna Elisabeth of Holstein-Gottorp (m. 1727)
- Issue Among others…: Catherine II of Russia; Frederick Augustus, Prince of Anhalt-Zerbst
- House: Ascania
- Father: John Louis I, Prince of Anhalt-Dornburg
- Mother: Christine Eleonore of Zeutsch

Christian Augustus, Prince of Anhalt-Zerbst (29 November 1690, in Dornburg – 16 March 1747, in Zerbst) was a German prince of the House of Ascania, and the father of Catherine the Great of Russia.

He was a ruler of the Principality of Anhalt-Dornburg. From 1742, he was a ruler of the entire Principality of Anhalt-Zerbst. He was also a Prussian Generalfeldmarschall.

== Life ==
Christian Augustus was the third son of John Louis I, Prince of Anhalt-Dornburg and Christine Eleonore of Zeutsch (1666–1699). After the death of his father in 1704, Christian Augustus inherited Anhalt-Dornburg jointly with his brothers John Louis II, John Augustus (died 1709), Christian Louis (died 1710) and John Frederick (died 1742).

After possibly six months as a captain in the regiment guard in 1708, on 11 February 1709 he joined the Regiment on foot in Anhalt-Zerbst (No. 8) which later changed its name to the Grenadier's Regiment King Frederick William IV of Prussia. It was stationed in Stettin. In 1711, Christian Augustus was awarded the Order De la Générosité, later renamed in Pour le Mérite, and on 1 March 1713 was elevated to the rank of lieutenant-colonel. After he took part in several military campaigns during the War of the Spanish Succession in the Spanish Netherlands, in 1714 Christian Augustus was appointed Chief of the Regiment; two years later, on 4 January 1716 he was named colonel and on 14 August 1721 became major-general.

On 22 January 1729 he became commander of Stettin, after having been chosen there on 24 May 1725 as a knight of Order of the Black Eagle. Christian Augustus was designated on 28 May 1732 lieutenant-general and on 8 April 1741 infantry general. On 5 June of that year he was designated Governor of Stettin. On 16 May 1742 Prussian King Frederick the Great awarded him the highest military dignity, the rank of Generalfeldmarschall.

Six months later, the death of his cousin John Augustus, Prince of Anhalt-Zerbst, without any issue made him and his older and only surviving brother, John Louis II, the heirs of Anhalt-Zerbst as co-rulers. Christian Augustus remained in Stettin and his brother took full charge of the government, but he died only four years later, unmarried and childless. For this reason, Christian Augustus had to leave Stettin and return to Zerbst, but he only reigned four months until his own death.

== Marriage and issue ==
On 8 November 1727 in Vechelde, Christian Augustus married Johanna Elisabeth of Holstein-Gottorp (24 October 1712 – 30 May 1760), daughter of Prince Christian Augustus of Schleswig-Holstein-Gottorp, Prince of Eutin and sister of King Adolf Frederick of Sweden. They had five children:

- Sophie Auguste Fredericka (2 May 1729 – 17 November 1796), who later became Catherine II the Great, Empress of Russia.
- William Christian Frederick (17 November 1730 – 27 August 1742).
- Frederick Augustus (8 August 1734 – 3 March 1793).
- Auguste Christine Charlotte (10 November 1736 – 24 November 1736).
- Elisabeth Ulrike (17 December 1742 – 5 March 1745).

== Ancestors ==
Ancestors of Christian Augustus, Prince of Anhalt-Zerbst

8. Rudolph, Prince of Anhalt-Zerbst
4. John VI, Prince of Anhalt-Zerbst
9. Countess Magdalena of Oldenburg
2. John Louis I, Prince of Anhalt-Dornburg
10. Frederick III, Duke of Holstein-Gottorp
5. Sophie Augusta of Holstein-Gottorp
11. Duchess Marie Elisabeth of Saxony
1. Christian Augustus, Prince of Anhalt-Zerbst
12. Christian von Zeutsch
6. Georg Volrath von Zeutsch
13. Lucretia von Spiegel
3. Christine Eleanore von Zeutsch
14. Wolf Georg von Weissenbach
7. Christine von Weissenbach
15. Martha von Konritz

Preceded by John Louis I	Prince of Anhalt-Dornburg; 1704 – 1747; With: John Augustus 1704–1709; Christian Louis 1704–1710; John Frederick 1704–1742; John Louis II 1704–1746	Succeeded by Frederick Augustus
Preceded by John Augustus	Prince of Anhalt-Zerbst; 1742 – 1747; With: John Louis II 1742–1746	Succeeded by Frederick Augustus
