= John II of Anhalt-Zerbst =

German prince

John II, Prince of Anhalt-Zerbst (died 11 April 1382) was a German prince of the House of Ascania and ruler of the principality of Anhalt-Zerbst.

He was the youngest son of Albert II, Prince of Anhalt-Zerbst, by his second wife Beatrix, daughter of Rudolf I, Elector of Saxony and Duke of Saxe-Wittemberg.

== Life ==
The death of his older brother Albert III in 1359 made John his father's sole heir; his older brother Rudolf was an ordained priest. In 1362 John inherited the principality of Anhalt-Zerbst, but first had to rule jointly with his uncle Waldemar I until his death in 1368, then with his cousin Waldemar II, who died without issue four years later (in 1371). Following his cousin's death, John became the sole ruler of Anhalt-Zerbst.

== Marriage and issue ==
In 1366 John married Elisabeth (died Dessau, after 20 January 1420), daughter of John I, Count of Henneberg-Schleusingen. They had four children:

1. Agnes (d. bef. 5 July 1392), married bef. 23 September 1382 to Burchard of Schraplau.
2. Sigismund I, Prince of Anhalt-Zerbst, later Anhalt-Dessau (d. Coswig, 19 January 1405).
3. Albert IV, Prince of Anhalt-Zerbst, later Anhalt-Köthen (d. Coswig, 24 November 1423).
4. Waldemar III, Prince of Anhalt-Zerbst (d. 1391).

John II of Anhalt-Zerbst House of Ascania Died: 11 April 1382
Regnal titles
Preceded by Albert II	Princes of Anhalt-Zerbst; 1362–1382 with Waldemar I (1316–1368); Waldemar II (1368–1371)	Succeeded by Sigismund I, Albert IV and Waldemar III
