= Prince Waldemar of Prussia =

Prince Waldemar of Prussia may refer to:

- Prince Waldemar of Prussia (1817–1849), son of Prince Wilhelm of Prussia (1783–1851)
- Prince Waldemar of Prussia (1868–1879), son of Emperor Frederick III
- Prince Waldemar of Prussia (1889–1945), son of Prince Henry

== See also ==
- Prince Waldemar (disambiguation)
