= Albert II of Anhalt-Zerbst =

German prince

Albert II, Prince of Anhalt-Zerbst (died 17 July 1362) was a German prince of the House of Ascania and ruler of the principality of Anhalt-Zerbst.

He was the third son of Albert I, Prince of Anhalt-Zerbst, but the eldest child born to his second wife Agnes, daughter of Conrad, Margrave of Brandenburg-Stendal.

== Life ==
Still a minor when his father died in 1316, Albert and his younger brother and co-ruler Waldemar I were put under the custody of their maternal uncle, Waldemar, Margrave of Brandenburg-Stendal. When both brothers were proclaimed adults, they decided to ruled jointly without a territorial division of their inheritance, but with separated residences: Waldemar I decided to live in Dessau and Albert in Zerbst or Köthen.

Together, the brothers acquired full sovereignty over Zerbst, the Margraviate of Landsberg, and the Palatine County of Saxony after the extinction of the Ascanian line of Brandenburg (Frankfurt-am-Main, 27 September 1320), but the Margraviate of Brandenburg was taken by the Emperor Louis IV on behalf of his son. Three years later, in 1323, Albert was granted the title "Princeps Ascaniae" (Prince of Ascania).

== Marriages and Issue ==
On 2 September 1324 Albert married Agnes (d. bef. 25 January 1337), daughter of Vitslav III, Prince of Rügen. The union was childless.

In ca. 1337 Albert married for a second time to Beatrix (d. aft. 26 February 1345), daughter of Rudolf I, Duke of Saxe-Wittenberg. Her paternal grandmother Agnes of Habsburg was a daughter of Rudolph I, Holy Roman Emperor. The spouses were second cousins once removed: Beatrix's great-grandfather Albert I, Duke of Saxony, was a brother of Henry I, Count of Anhalt, Albert's great-great-grandfather. They had five children:

1. A daughter (d. ca. 1353), who married Albert VII, Count of Barby-Mühlingen.
2. Judith (d. 23 February 1381), married on 11 March 1358 to Burkhard XII, Burggrave of Magdeburg, Count of Retz, and Lord of Kaya.
3. Albert III, Prince of Anhalt-Zerbst (d. ca. 1 August 1359).
4. Rudolph (II) (d. 3 September 1365), Bishop of Schwerin (1365).
5. John II, Prince of Anhalt-Zerbst (d. 11 April 1382).

Preceded by Albert I	Prince of Anhalt-Zerbst with Waldemar I; with Albert III in 1359; 1316–1362	Succeeded by John II
