= Battle of Hova =

1275 battle in Sweden

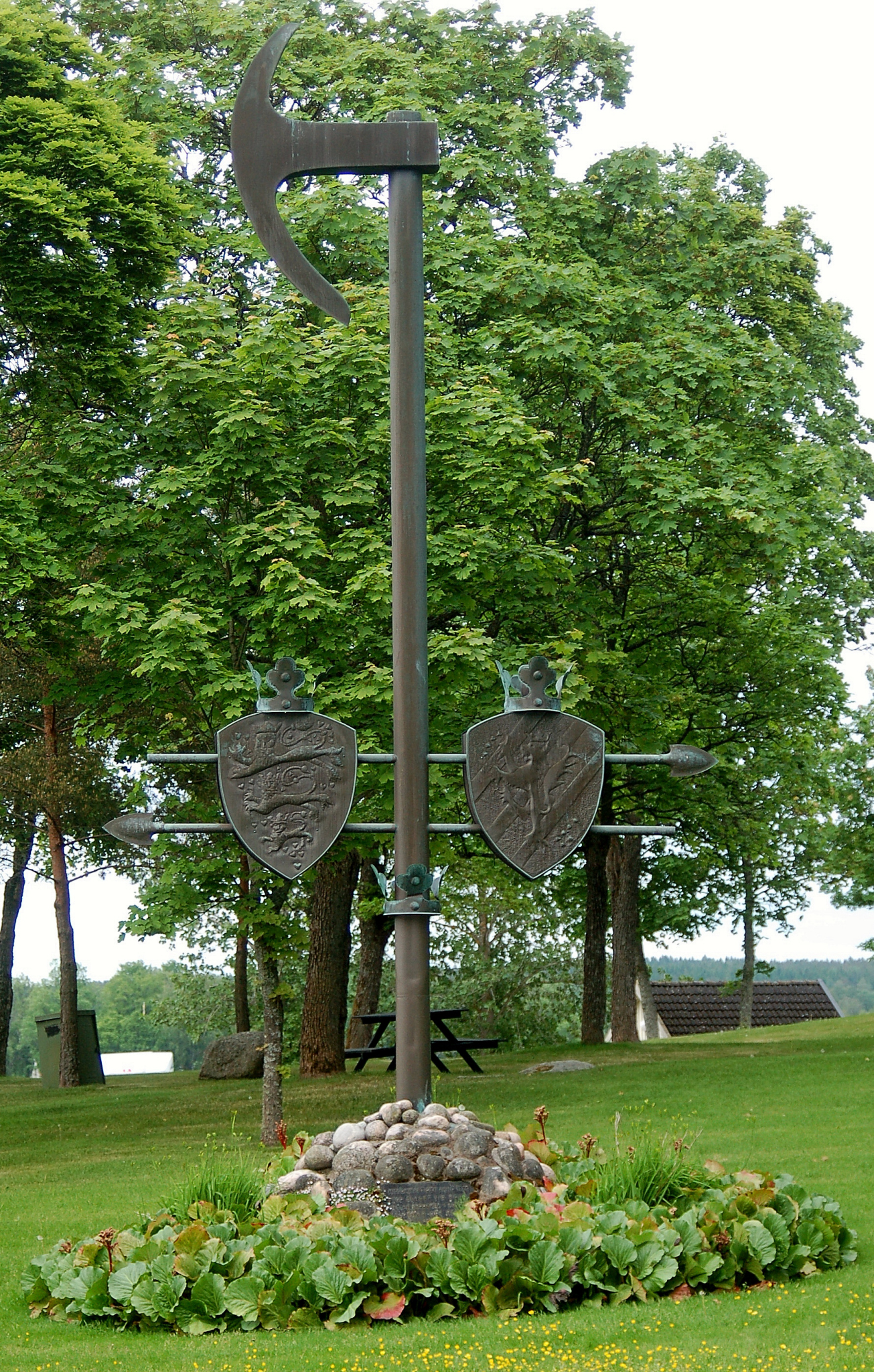
Date	14 June 1275
Location	Hova, Sweden 58°51′N 14°13′E
Result	Victory for Duke Magnus

Commanders and leaders
Duke Magnus; Erik Birgersson	Valdemar of Sweden

Strength
100 Danish provided by Erik Klipping, 700 Danish and German provided by count Jacob of Halland	Unknown

The Battle of Hova (Swedish: Slaget vid Hova) was fought in Hova, Sweden on 14 June 1275 between peasants commanded by King Valdemar of Sweden and Danish cavalry commanded by Duke Magnus and his brother Erik. The result was that Valdemar had to flee to Norway and Magnus became king of Sweden. It was a part of a series of conflicts between Magnus and his elder brother Valdemar.
