= Albert I of Anhalt-Zerbst =

German prince (c. 1258–1316)

Albert I

Prince of Anhalt-Zerbst
- Reign: 1298-17 August 1316
- Predecessor: Siegfried I
- Successor: Albert II and Waldemar I
- Born: c. 1258
- Died: 17 August 1316
- Spouse: Liutgard; Agnes
- Issue: Siegfried II; Henry; Albert II; Agnes; Waldemar I Judith; Matilda
- House: Ascania
- Father: Siegfried I
- Mother: Catherine

Albert I (born c. 1258; died 17 August 1316) was a German prince of the House of Ascania and the second ruler of the Principality of Anhalt-Zerbst from 1298 until his death.

== Life ==
He was the eldest son of Prince Siegfried I of Anhalt-Zerbst, by his wife Catherine, who was possible a daughter of the Swedish regent Birger Jarl. From about 1290, after Prince Siegfried abdicated to become a preaching monk, Albert ruled the Anhalt territories of his father, then comprising the towns of Dessau and Köthen. In 1295, Prince Albert was the first member of the House of Ascania who took his residence at Köthen Castle.

He participated in the 1291 siege of Harly Castle against the Welf duke Henry I of Brunswick-Grubenhagen. Together with Abbot Konrad of Nienburg and his cousin Prince Bernhard II of Anhalt-Bernburg, Albert abolished the use of Polabian (Wendish) as a court language in his domains in 1293. He later obtained a part of Zerbst still controlled by the Ascanian Margraves of Brandenburg as a fiefdom. The acquisition was accomplished about 1307.

After the murder of the Habsburg king Albert I of Germany in 1308 he was suggested by his brother-in-law Margrave Waldemar of Brandenburg to be elected the new King of the Romans, but had no success in obtaining this dignity.

== Marriages and issue ==
Albert's first marriage was to Liutgard (b. ca. 1251 - d. aft. 28 February 1289), daughter of Count Gerhard I of Holstein-Itzehoe, and widow of Duke John of Brunswick-Lüneburg. They had two sons:

1. Siegfried II (d. ca. 1307/1316), a canon in Coswig.
2. Henry (d. bef. 2 March 1317), a canon in Coswig.

In 1300 Albert married for a second time to Agnes (d. 4 June 1330), daughter of Margrave Conrad of Brandenburg-Stendal. Through her father she was a 2nd great-granddaughter of Margrave Otto I of Brandenburg, older brother of Count Bernhard of Anhalt, Albert's great-grandfather. They had five children:

1. Albert II, Prince of Anhalt-Zerbst (d. 17 July 1362).
2. Agnes (d. 1352), married bef. 2 September 1324 to Ulrich II, Count of Lindau-Ruppin.
3. Waldemar I, Prince of Anhalt-Zerbst (d. 7 January 1368).
4. Judith, married bef. 1337 to Albert I, Count of Regenstein.
5. Matilda (d. ca. 1342), married in 1339 to Prince Bernhard III of Anhalt-Bernburg.

Preceded by Siegfried I	Prince of Anhalt-Zerbst; 1298–1316	Succeeded by Albert II and Waldemar I
