= Siegfried I of Anhalt-Zerbst =

Prince of Anhalt-Zerbst and candidate for the German throne

Siegfried I
- Prince of Anhalt-Zerbst
- Anhalt coat of arms
- Born: c. 1230
- Died: 25 March 1298; Köthen, Anhalt
- Noble family: House of Ascania
- Spouse: Catherine
- Issue: Albert I, Prince of Anhalt-Zerbst
- Father: Henry I, Count of Anhalt
- Mother: Irmgard of Thuringia

Siegfried I (c. 1230 – 25 March 1298), a member of the House of Ascania, ruled as the first Prince of Anhalt-Zerbst from 1252 until his death.

== Life ==
Siegfried was the youngest son of Prince Henry I of Anhalt by his wife Irmgard, daughter of the Ludovingian landgrave Hermann I of Thuringia. His father had received the Anhalt territory upon the death of Duke Bernhard III of Saxony in 1212 and was raised to the rank of a Prince of the Holy Roman Empire six years later.

In 1247, after the death of the Thuringian landgrave Henry Raspe, younger brother of his mother Irmgard and last male heir of the Ludovinger dynasty, Siegfried interfered in the succeeding War of the Thuringen Succession. During the conflict, the young prince occupied the County palatine (German: Pfalzgrafschaft), by right of his mother. Later he renounced the county in favor of the Wettin margrave Henry III of Meissen in exchange for a monetary compensation.

Anhalt after the 1252 partition, Siegfried's territories in green

After the death of his father in 1252, in accordance with the family law of the Ascanian dynasty, Siefgried and his elder brothers Henry II and Bernhard divided the Anhalt lands. Siegfried received the eastern estates around Köthen. His style Count of Köthen-Dessau (used from 1253) likewise derived from the territories he received as his inheritance. In 1273 he even stood as a candidate in the Imperial election, though the princes eventually elected Count Rudolf of Habsburg king.

In 1290 Siegfried renounced his rule to become a preaching monk (German: Predigermönch). As a result, his eldest son Prince Albert I of Anhalt became the actual ruler in the Köthen and Zerbst estates, although the former prince retained his rank until his death. Siegfried died at Köthen Castle in 1298.

== Marriage and issue ==
On 17 October 1259, Siegfried married Catherine, who is referred to as filia Regis Sweonum ("daughter of the Swedish King") in contemporary German sources. It has been suggested that she was either a daughter of King Erik Eriksson of Sweden, or a daughter of the Swedish regent Birger Jarl. They had ten children:

1. Albert I, Prince of Anhalt-Zerbst (d. 17 August 1316).
2. Henry (d. 13 December 1340 / 28 March 1341?), Provost of Halberstadt.
3. Siegfried (d. 25 February 1317), a canon in Magdeburg.
4. Hermann (d. aft. 24 June 1328), a Teutonic knight, Comtur at Dessau in 1327.
5. Agnes (d. aft. 17 August 1316), Abbess of Coswig.
6. Hedwig (d. aft. 24 February 1319), Abbess of Coswig.
7. Elisabeth (d. aft. 17 August 1316), a nun in Coswig.
8. Judith (d. aft. 17 August 1316), a nun in Coswig.
9. Konstanze (d. aft. 17 August 1316), a nun in Coswig.
10. Sophie (d. aft. 9 January 1290), married Ludwig of Hakeborn.

Siegfried I of Anhalt House of Ascania Born: c. 1230 Died: 25 March 1298
Regnal titles
Preceded by Henry I of Anhalt	Prince of Anhalt-Zerbst; 1252–1298	Succeeded by Albert I
