= Waldemar III of Anhalt-Zerbst =

German prince

Waldemar III, Prince of Anhalt-Zerbst (died 1391) was a German prince of the House of Ascania and ruler of the principality of Anhalt-Zerbst.

He was the youngest son of John II, Prince of Anhalt-Zerbst, by his wife Elisabeth, daughter of John I, Count of Henneberg-Schleusingen.

== Life ==
Waldemar inherited the principality of Anhalt-Zerbst when his father died in 1382. According to the family law of the House of Ascania, he was obliged to rule jointly with his older brothers Sigismund I and Albert IV.

He never married and on his death was succeeded by his brothers. Five years later (1396), Sigismund and Albert divided the principality of Anhalt-Zerbst and created two new principalities: Anhalt-Dessau and Anhalt-Köthen.

Waldemar III of Anhalt-Zerbst House of Ascania Died: 1391
Preceded by John II	Prince of Anhalt-Zerbst; 1382–1391 with Sigismund I (1382–1396); Albert IV (1382–1396)	Succeeded by Sigismund I and Albert IV
