= John Augustus, Prince of Anhalt-Zerbst =

German prince (1677–1742)

John Augustus
- Prince of Anhalt-Zerbst
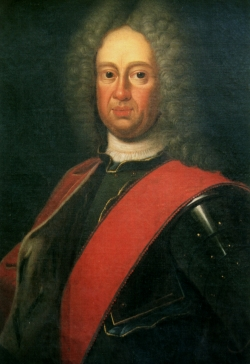
- 18th-century portrait
- Born: 29 July 1677
- Died: 7 November 1742 (aged 65)
- Spouse: Fredericka of Saxe-Gotha-Altenburg; Hedwig Fredericka of Württemberg-Weiltingen
- House: House of Ascania
- Father: Karl William, Prince of Anhalt-Zerbst
- Mother: Duchess Sophia of Saxe-Weissenfels

John Augustus, Prince of Anhalt-Zerbst (29 July 1677 in Zerbst – 7 November 1742 in Zerbst), was a German prince of the House of Ascania and ruler of the principality of Anhalt-Zerbst.

He was the eldest son of Karl William, Prince of Anhalt-Zerbst, and his wife Sophie, daughter of August, Duke of Saxe-Weissenfels.

== Life ==
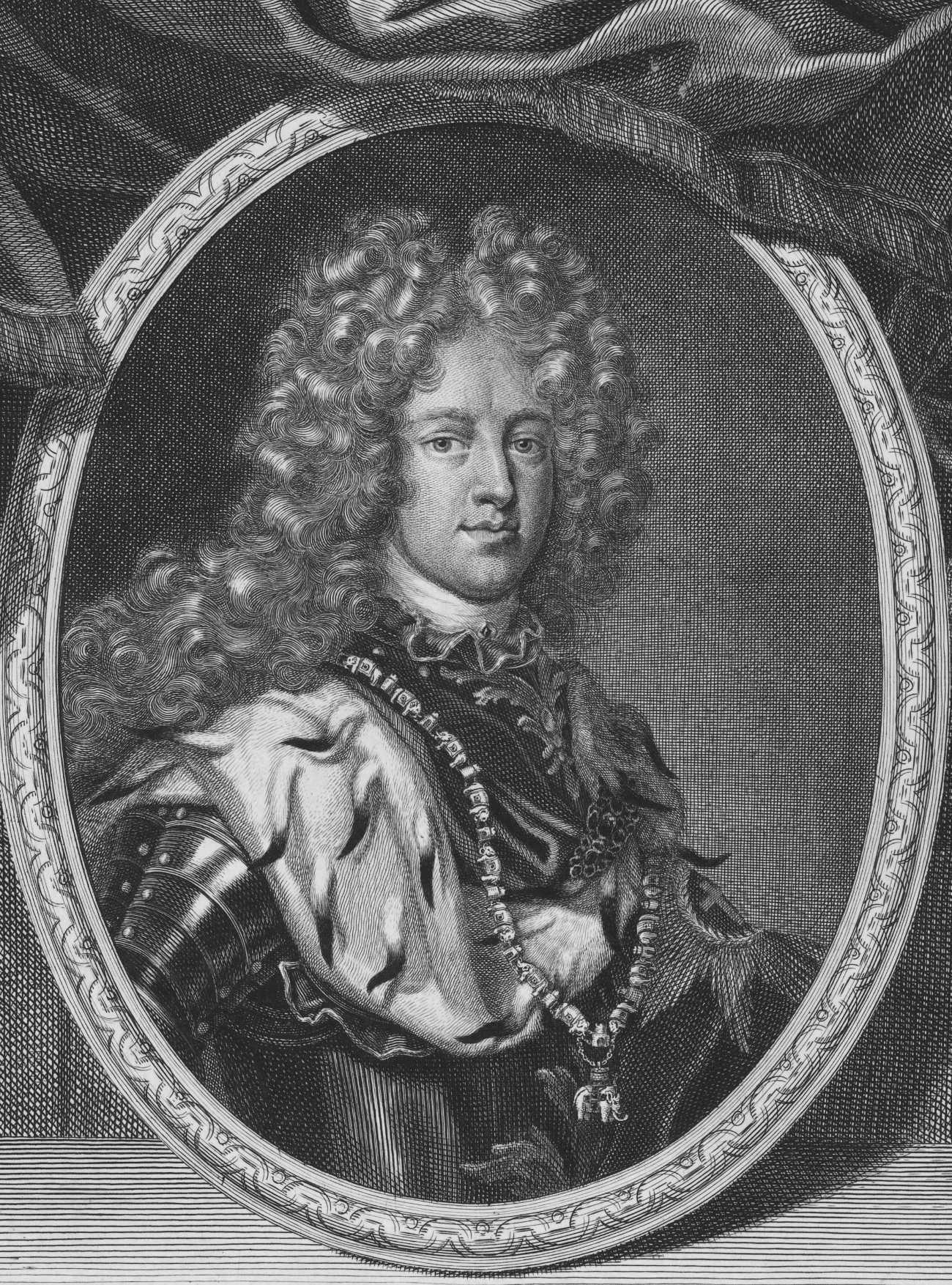
Engraving of John Augustus by Martin Bernigeroth, early 18th century

Royal monogram

In 1718, after the death of Karl William, John Augustus became prince of Anhalt-Zerbst.

John Augustus married Fredericka (b. Gotha, 24 March 1675; d. Karlsbad, 28 May 1709), daughter of Frederick I, Duke of Saxe-Gotha-Altenburg, on 25 May 1702 in Zerbst. They had no children. He married a second time to Hedwig Fredericka (b. Weiltingen, 18 October 1691; d. Zerbst, 14 August 1752), daughter of Frederick Ferdinand, Duke of Württemberg-Weiltingen (a grandson of Julius Frederick, Duke of Württemberg-Weiltingen), on 8 October 1715 in Zerbst. This union was also childless.

Since John Augustus died without issue, the elder line of Anhalt-Zerbst became extinct. On his death, he was succeeded by his first cousins, the princes of Anhalt-Dornburg.

== Ancestry ==
Ancestors of John Augustus, Prince of Anhalt-Zerbst

8. Rudolph, Prince of Anhalt-Zerbst
4. John VI, Prince of Anhalt-Zerbst
9. Magdalene of Oldenburg
2. Karl Wilhelm, Prince of Anhalt-Zerbst
10. Frederick III, Duke of Holstein-Gottorp
5. Sophie Augusta, Princess of Holstein-Gottorp
11. Marie Elisabeth of Saxony
1. John Augustus of Anhalt-Zerbst
12. John George I, Elector of Saxony
6. August, Duke of Saxe-Weissenfels
13. Magdalene Sibylle of Prussia
3. Duchess Sophia of Saxe-Weissenfels
14. Adolf Friedrich I, Duke of Mecklenburg-Schwerin
7. Anna Maria of Mecklenburg-Schwerin
15. Anna Maria of Ostfriesland

Preceded by Karl William	Prince of Anhalt-Zerbst; 1718–1742	Succeeded by John Louis II and Christian August
