= Valdemar, King of Sweden =

King of Sweden from 1250 to 1275

Valdemar
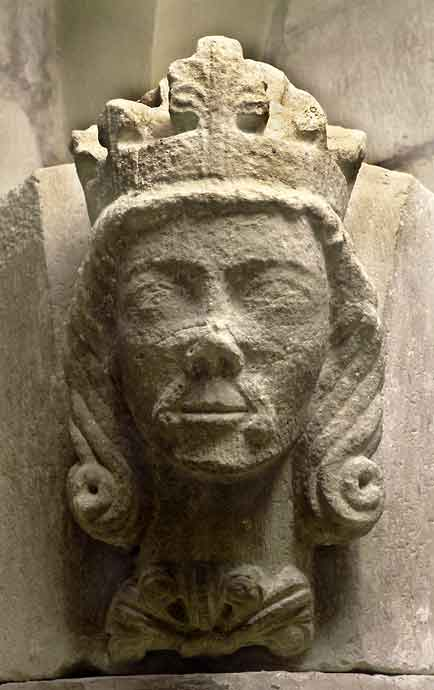
- King Valdemar in Skara Cathedral

King of Sweden
- Reign: 1250–1275
- Predecessor: Erik Eriksson
- Successor: Magnus Ladulås
- Born: 1239
- Died: 26 December 1302 (aged 62–63)
- Spouse: Sophia of Denmark
- Issue: Ingeborg, Countess of Holstein; Erik Valdemarsson the Elder; Richeza, Queen of Poland; Marina Valdemarsdotter; Katarina Valdemarsdotter; Margareta Valdemarsdotter
- House: Bjälbo
- Father: Birger Jarl
- Mother: Ingeborg Eriksdotter of Sweden

Valdemar Birgersson (1239 – 26 December 1302), also known as Waldemar, was King of Sweden from 1250 to 1275. A member of the House of Bjälbo, he was the eldest son of Birger Jarl and Ingeborg Eriksdotter. He was elected king following the death of his maternal uncle, Erik Eriksson, in 1250, while still a minor. During the early part of his reign, political power was largely exercised by his father. After Birger Jarl's death in 1266, Valdemar ruled independently. He was deposed in 1275 by his younger brother Magnus Ladulås, who succeeded him as king.

== Biography ==
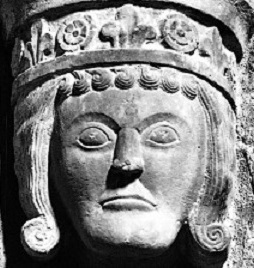
Valdemar's father Birger Jarl

Valdemar was the son of Birger Jarl, of the House of Bjälbo, and the Swedish princess Ingeborg Eriksdotter, daughter of King Erik Knutsson. Through his mother, Valdemar was a descendant of the House of Erik and a great-great-grandson of Saint Erik. When his maternal uncle, King Erik Eriksson, died without issue in 1250, Valdemar was elected king, his maternal descent from the former royal dynasty strengthening his claim to the throne. He was crowned at Linköping in 1251. As Valdemar was still a minor, Birger Jarl became the effective ruler of the kingdom and retained this position even after Valdemar reached adulthood, until Birger's death in 1266. Valdemar thereafter exercised royal authority independently.

After Birger's death in 1266 Valdemar eventually came into conflict with his younger brother Magnus Birgersson (later known as Magnus Ladulås), Duke of Södermanland, over taxation and personal matters.

In 1260, Valdemar married Sophia, the eldest daughter of King Eric IV of Denmark and Jutta of Saxony. Valdemar also had a relationship with his sister-in-law Jutta. In 1272, Princess Jutta visited Sweden and became Valdemar's mistress. The affair resulted in a child born in 1273. The following year, Jutta was placed in a convent and Valdemar was forced to make a pilgrimage to Rome to ask for the absolution of Pope Gregory X.

Valdemar was deposed by his brother Magnus after the Battle of Hova in Tiveden on 14 June 1275. Magnus was supported by his brother Erik Birgersson, Duke of Småland, and King Eric V of Denmark, who provided Danish soldiers. Magnus was elected King of Sweden at the Stones of Mora.

In 1277, Sophia separated from her spouse and returned to Denmark. That year, Valdemar managed to regain provinces in Götaland in the southern part of the kingdom and was called the Duke of Götaland. However, Magnus regained them about 1278. In 1288 Valdemar was imprisoned by King Magnus in Nyköping Castle (Nyköpingshus) and lived openly with mistresses, possibly new wives, in comfortable confinement.

== Family ==
Valdemar married Sophia of Denmark in 1260. The couple remained formally married, although Valdemar appears to have left her around 1280; Sophia died in Denmark in 1286. Valdemar was later reported to have entered into three further marriages, although the historicity of some of these unions is uncertain. He had six known children:

- Ingeborg (1263–1292), married Gerhard II, Count of Holstein-Plön
- Erik (1272–1330), riksråd of Sweden and Norway
- Marina (fl. 1285), married Rudolf II, Lord of Diepholz in 1285
- Richeza (died c. 1292), married Przemysł II of Poland
- Katarina (died 1283)
- Margareta, abbess of Skänninge Abbey

== Bibliography ==
- Adolfsson, Mats (2007). När borgarna brann : Forntiden–1499 (in Swedish). Stockholm: Natur och kultur. ISBN 978-91-27-02631-5.
- Harrison, Dick (2003). Jarlens sekel: en berättelse om 1200-talets Sverige (in Swedish). Stockholm: Ordfront. ISBN 91-7324-999-8.
- Kyhlberg, Ola; Ahlström, Torbjörn (1997). Gånget ur min hand: Riddarholmskyrkans stiftargravar. Stockholm: Kungl. Vitterhets historie och antikvitets akademien. ISBN 978-91-7402-275-9. OCLC 39393072.
- Larsson, Mats G. (2002). Götarnas riken : Upptäcktsfärder Till Sveriges Enande (in Swedish). Stockholm: Atlantis. ISBN 978-91-7486-641-4.
- Line, Philip (2007). Kingship and State Formation in Sweden. Leiden; Boston: BRILL. ISBN 978-90-04-15578-7.
- Schück, Herman (2005). Kyrka och rike (in Swedish). Stockholm: Sällskapet Runica et Mediævalia. ISBN 978-91-88568-24-3.

Valdemar Birgersson House of Bjälbo Born: 1239 Died: 26 December 1302
Regnal titles
Preceded by Erik Eriksson	King of Sweden; 1250–1275	Succeeded by Magnus Ladulås
