= Ingeborg Eriksdotter of Sweden =

Swedish princess

Ingeborg Eriksdotter
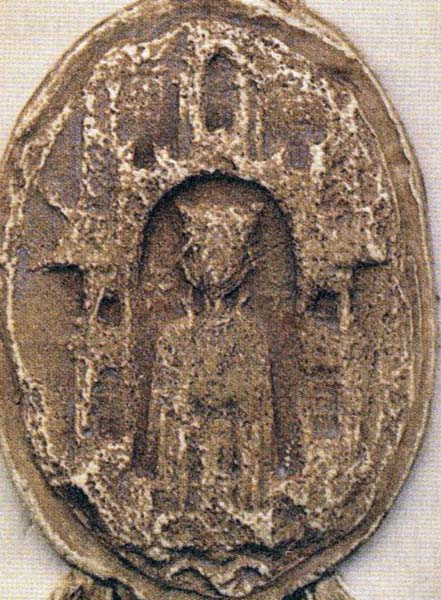
- The seal of Princess Ingeborg of Sweden
- Born: c. 1212
- Died: 17 June 1254
- Spouse: Birger Jarl
- Issue: Rikissa, Queen of Norway; Valdemar, King of Sweden; Magnus Ladulås, King of Sweden; Catherine, Countess of Anhalt; Erik, Duke of Småland; Ingeborg, Duchess of Saxony; Bengt, Duke of Finland
- House: Erik
- Father: Erik Knutsson
- Mother: Rikissa of Denmark

Ingeborg Eriksdotter (after 1214 – 17 June 1254) was a Swedish princess, daughter of King Erik Knutsson, eldest sibling of King Erik Eriksson, wife of Birger Jarl, and mother of Kings Valdemar and Magnus Ladulås.

== Biography ==
Ingeborg was born the eldest daughter of King Erik Knutsson and his wife Rikissa of Denmark. Her parents married in 1210 and she was born at the earliest on 1214. She lived during her youth in exile in Denmark after her brother had been deposed by his guardian and regent in 1229.

Sometime between 1235 and 1240 Ingeborg married Birger Magnusson of the House of Bjälbo, who supported her brother Erik Eriksson to reacquire the Swedish throne from the usurper Knut Långe. When Jarl Ulf Fase died in 1248, Birger was made the Jarl of Sweden. He had almost as much power as the king himself, partially because of his royal wife Ingeborg.

Princess Ingeborg bore many children to her husband Birger. In 1250, her brother Erik died without an heir and her eldest son Valdemar was chosen to succeed him on the throne. Valdemar was chosen partially because of his mother's royal lineage, and because his father belonged to the House of Sverker from his mother's side. During Valdemar's minority, Birger Jarl was made regent. Ingeborg thus became King's Mother and first lady of the royal court.

Ingeborg is recorded to have inherited her brother Erik's private property upon his death, as his only living sibling. Even in her forties, she continued to give birth to children, and her death is believed to have occurred because of childbirth complications, possibly giving birth to twins.

=== Children ===
The following children survived to adulthood:

- Rikissa, born 1238, married first in 1251 Haakon Haakonsson the Young, co-king of Norway, and second Henry I, Prince of Werle
- Valdemar, born c. 1238, King of Sweden 1250–1275, Duke of Götaland until 1278
- Magnus Ladulås, born 1240, Duke of Södermanland, then King of Sweden 1275–90
- Catherine, born 1245, married Siegfried, Count of Anhalt
- Erik, 1250–1275, Duke of Småland in 1275
- Ingeborg, born circa 1254, died 30 June 1302, married John I of Saxony, Duke of Lauenburg in 1270
- Bengt, born 1254, Duke of Finland and Bishop of Linköping
