= Magnus Ladulås =

King of Sweden from 1275 to 1290

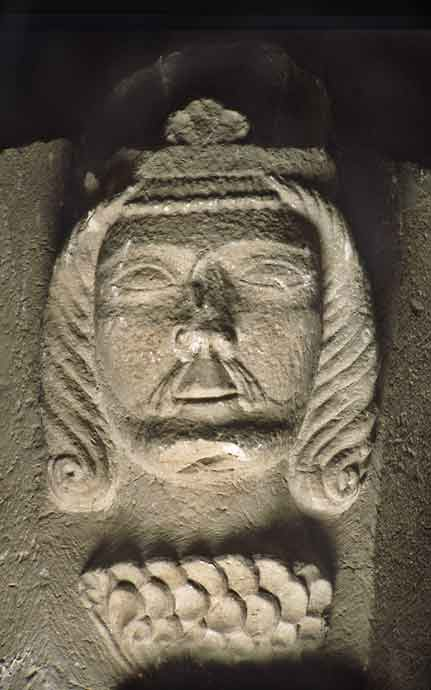
- Bust of Magnus as duke at Skara Cathedral

King of Sweden
- Reign: 1275 – 18 December 1290
- Predecessor: Valdemar
- Successor: Birger
- Born: c. 1240
- Died: 18 December 1290 (aged c. 50)
- Burial: Riddarholm Church
- Spouse: Helvig of Holstein
- Issue more...: Ingeborg, Queen of Denmark; Birger, King of Sweden; Erik, Duke of Södermanland; Valdemar, Duke of Finland; Rikissa, Abbess of St. Clara Priory
- House: Bjälbo
- Father: Birger Jarl
- Mother: Ingeborg Eriksdotter of Sweden

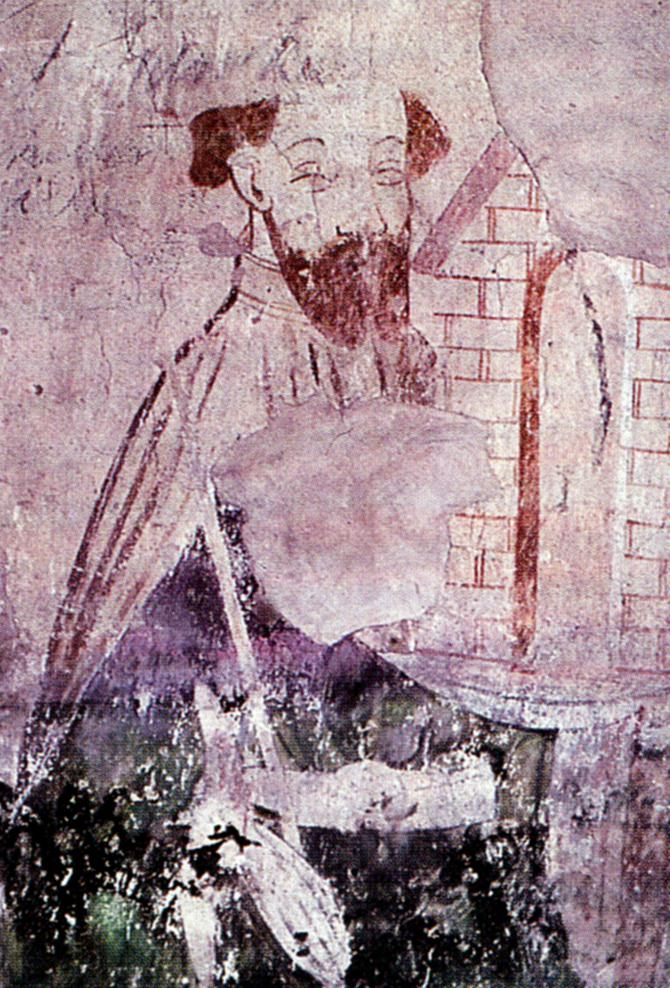
14th-century depiction of King Magnus on a high tower wall of his burial church

Magnus Ladulås (pronounced ['lɑːdɵloːs], lit. 'Barnlock'), also known as Magnus Birgersson (c. 1240 – 18 December 1290), was King of Sweden from 1275 until his death in 1290.

A son of Birger Jarl and Ingeborg Eriksdotter, Magnus became king after he and his brother Erik Birgersson rebelled against their elder brother, King Valdemar, in 1275. Valdemar was defeated at the Battle of Hova, and Magnus was acclaimed king later that year. Following Magnus's death in 1290, he was succeeded by his ten-year-old son Birger, during whose minority Sweden was governed by a regency headed by Torgils Knutsson.

Medieval Swedish kings did not use regnal numbers as part of their title. In modern literature he may be referred to as either Magnus I or Magnus III.

== Epithet ==
The origin of the epithet Ladulås (lit. 'Barnlock') is not known for certain, due to the lack of source material from the latter half of the 14th century. It appears widely in written documents from the beginning of the 15th century, with the Visby Chronicle from 1412 being the oldest datable document. Lilla rimkrönikan from c. 1450 gives the traditional explanation, ascribing the epithet to the Ordinance of Alsnö. This act by Magnus freed the yeomanry from the duty to provide sustenance for travelling nobles and bishops, and "locked the barns".

Another theory is that Ladulås is a corruption of a second name Ladislaus, the Latin equivalent of the Slavic name Vladislav. (Magnus's maternal great-grandmother was Sophia of Minsk, a Rurikid princess.)

== Early life ==
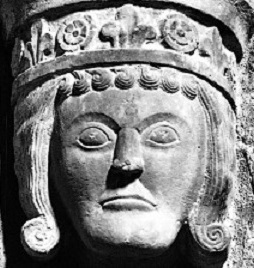
Magnus's father Birger Jarl

Magnus was born around 1240 as the second son of Birger Jarl (1200–1266) and Princess Ingeborg, daughter of King Erik Knutsson and sister of King Erik Eriksson of Sweden. The early life of Magnus is poorly documented, but he seems to have received an extensive education.

Erik Eriksson ruled until 1250 and died without an heir. After his death, Magnus' elder brother Valdemar (1239–1302) became king, but the true power was held by their father Birger Jarl who acted as a regent. In 1255, Magnus was granted the title of a iunior dux, 'junior jarl'.

When Birger died in 1266, Magnus assumed his title as the Duke of Sweden. The title was not accompanied by any unified territory, but by a number of scattered estates and rights to collect taxes and fines. He also received Nyköping Castle in Södermanland.

There is no indication that he would have received the powers of his father. According to the Erik's Chronicle, Magnus wanted to share the Royal power with his brother, which led to a conflict.

== Accession and marriage ==
In 1275, Duke Magnus started a rebellion against Valdemar, supported by his younger brother Erik and King Eric Klipping of Denmark. Valdemar was deposed by Magnus after the Battle of Hova in the forest of Tiveden on 14 June 1275 with the help of Danish and German horsemen. In July, Magnus was elected king at the Stones of Mora.

In 1276, Magnus married Helvig, daughter of Gerard I of Holstein. Through her mother, Elizabeth of Mecklenburg, Helvig was a descendant of Christina, the putative daughter of King Sverker II. A papal annulment of Magnus' alleged first marriage and a dispensation for the second (necessary because of consanguinity) were issued ten years later, in 1286. Helvig later acted as regent, probably 1290–1302 and 1320–1327.

== Reign ==
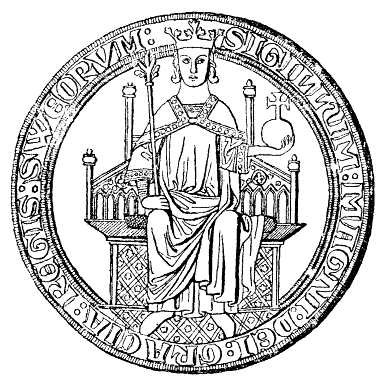
Seal of King Magnus

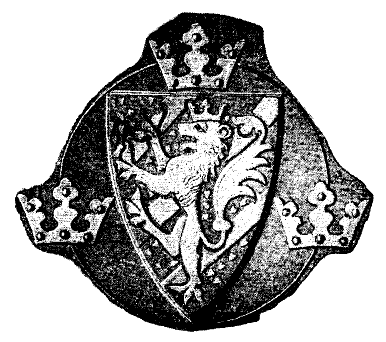
Coat of arms of Magnus Ladulås

The deposed King Valdemar continued to challenge Magnus's rule, receiving Danish support and regaining control over parts of Götaland in 1277. Following further negotiations, Valdemar renounced his claim to the throne, and Magnus consolidated his authority over the kingdom by 1278. Magnus also became the first Swedish monarch to regularly use the title rex Sweorum et Gothorum (King of the Swedes and the Goths), establishing a tradition continued by subsequent Swedish monarchs.

Magnus strengthened royal authority by suppressing opposition from powerful noble families, including a rebellion that culminated in the execution of several leading nobles in 1280. Around the same year, he issued the Ordinance of Alsnö, one of the most significant legislative reforms of medieval Sweden. The ordinance prohibited the practice of forced hospitality, under which nobles and royal officials could demand food and lodging from peasants without payment. It also granted exemptions from royal taxation to those who provided mounted military service, laying the foundations for the Swedish privileged nobility (frälse). These measures strengthened the relationship between the monarchy and the military aristocracy while protecting peasants from certain abuses of power.

Magnus also cultivated close relations with the Church, granting extensive privileges and tax exemptions to ecclesiastical institutions in 1281. He supported the establishment and expansion of monasteries, particularly those belonging to the Franciscan Order. In 1284, he issued the Skänninge Ordinance, which regulated the conduct and armed retinues of the nobility, prohibited unauthorized political alliances, and reinforced royal authority. His reign also witnessed the development of the Royal Council as an institution of government.

King Magnus's youngest brother, Bengt (1254–1291), then an archdeacon, served as one of his closest advisers. In 1284, Magnus granted him the Duchy of Finland. During the same year, Magnus secured the succession of his young son Birger, who was recognized as king, while his younger son Erik received the title of Duke of Sweden.

Royal charter issued by Magnus Ladulås on 18 May 1284, granting Jönköping the right to hold two annual markets and extending royal protection to merchants.

Magnus pursued policies to strengthen the kingdom's economy and commercial institutions, including the development of Jönköping as a trading centre. He also extended royal authority over Gotland through agreements in 1285 and intervention in the conflict between Visby and the island's rural population in 1288. During his reign, Swedish mining was documented in a significant charter dated 16 June 1288, concerning the exchange of a one-eighth ownership share in the Falun Mine by Peter, Bishop of Västerås. The document, authenticated with Magnus's seal, is among the earliest surviving records of share ownership in a mining enterprise.

Magnus died on 18 December 1290, leaving his sons underage. He was succeeded by Birger, then about ten years old, and a regency government headed by Torkel Knutsson, the Lord High Constable of Sweden, assumed control of the kingdom during the new king's minority.

== Legacy ==
In The Cambridge History of Scandinavia, historian Herman Schück describes Magnus's reign as having been regarded by his near contemporaries as a period of revolutionary significance. Schück argues that no other medieval Swedish monarch exercised comparable authority both domestically and abroad. Magnus was remembered as a lawgiver and protector of the peasantry, and even acquired a reputation for sanctity. However, the system of government established during his reign soon broke down as his circle of advisers passed away.

== Burial and archaeological investigations ==
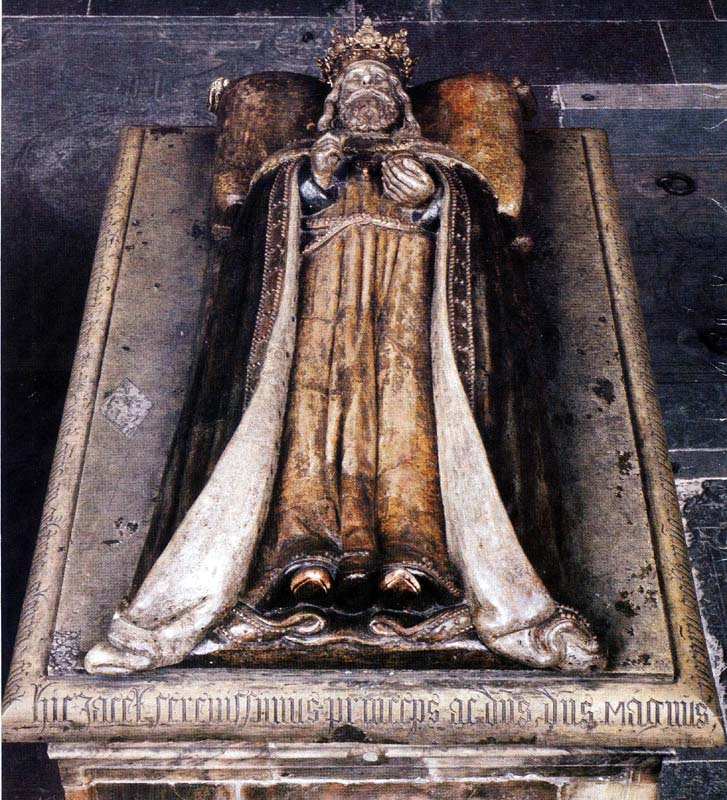
Magnus's 16th century grave monument over his family crypts in Riddarholm Church

In spring 2011, archaeologists and osteologists from the Stockholm University were granted permission to open one of the royal tombs in the Riddarholmen Church, traditionally believed to contain the remains of Magnus Ladulås and some of his relatives. An osteological and odontological examination revealed the presence of five male and two female skeletons. Preliminary studies indicated a notable sickly disposition in one skeleton, previously presumed to belong to Magnus Ladulås based on descriptions of his ailments. Contrary to expectations, radiocarbon dating indicated that the skeletons were from the 15th and early 16th centuries, and could not belong to the king and his family.

In 2012, the research team was permitted to open the adjacent tomb, traditionally believed to contain King Karl Knutsson (c. 1408–1470). The analysis showed that these remains were from the 15th and early 16th century, and one skeleton matched the expected profile for King Karl. The location of Magnus Ladulås's grave remains unresolved. In 2014, the team discovered a previously unknown brick chamber between the two tombs, but further excavation was halted due to legal and administrative challenges.

== Issue ==
From his alleged first (annulled) marriage to an unknown woman:

- Erik (born c. 1275 – c. 1277)

From his second marriage to Helvig of Holstein:

- Ingeborg (1277 – 1319); married King Eric VI of Denmark.
- Birger (1280 – 1321), King of Sweden from 1290 to 1318
- Erik (c. 1282 – 1318), duke, father to King Magnus Eriksson; the Erik's Chronicle is named after him
- Valdemar (after 1282 – 1318), Duke of Finland. Erik and Valdemar died of starvation 1318 at Nyköping Castle while imprisoned by his brother, King Birger.
- Rikissa (c. 1285 – after 1347), Abbess of the convent of St. Clare's Priory, Stockholm.

Magnus Ladulås House of Bjälbo Born: 1240 Died: 18 December 1290
Regnal titles
Preceded by Valdemar	King of Sweden; 1275–1290	Succeeded by Birger
