= Catherine of Anhalt =

Catherine
- Princess consort of Anhalt-Zerbst
- Spouse: Siegfried I, Prince of Anhalt-Zerbst
- Issue: Albert I, Prince of Anhalt-Zerbst; Prince Henry; Prince Siegfried; Prince Hermann; Princess Agnes, Abbess of Coswig; Princess Hedwig, Abbess of Coswig; Princess Elisabeth; Princess Judith; Princess Konstanze; Princess Sophie von Hakeborn

Catherine (fl. 1245–1289) was Princess consort of Anhalt-Zerbst by marriage to Siegfried I, Prince of Anhalt-Zerbst (c. 1230 – 1298), regent to Principality of Anhalt and a member of the House of Ascania.

In German sources, she is referred to as filia Regis Sweonum ("daughter of the Swedish King"). In 1961, Danish genealogist Sixten Otto Brenner interpreted this to mean she was the daughter of King Erik Eriksson of Sweden. However, Hans Gillingstam challenged this conclusion, arguing that it is more likely she was the daughter of Birger Jarl, the regent of Sweden. In the same sources, Birger Jarl's other daughter, Rikissa, is referred to with the same title.

Gillingstam notes that Siegfried and Catherine were already married in 1259, which is 15 or 16 years after Erik Eriksson married his queen, Katarina Sunesdotter. Gillingstam found this time span too short and also noted that Catherine would only have been named after her mother only if her mother had died soon after her birth. Since Katarina Sunesdotter died between 1251 and 1253, and Erik Eriksson died on 2 February 1250, this scenario is impossible.

According to some sources, Catherine may instead have belonged to the family of Counts of Gleichen, which had connections to Danish royal house.

== Issue ==
Catherine and Siegfried had ten children:

- Albert I, Prince of Anhalt-Zerbst (d. 17 August 1316).
- Prince Henry of Anhalt-Zerbst (d. 13 December 1340 / 28 March 1341 ?), Provost of Halberstadt.
- Prince Siegfried of Anhalt-Zerbst (d. 25 February 1317), a canon in Magdeburg.
- Prince Hermann of Anhalt-Zerbst (d. aft. 24 June 1328), a Teutonic knight, Comtur at Dessau in 1327.
- Princess Agnes of Anhalt-Zerbst (d. aft. 17 August 1316), Abbess of Coswig.
- Princess Hedwig of Anhalt-Zerbst (d. aft. 24 February 1319), Abbess of Coswig.
- Princess Elisabeth of Anhalt-Zerbst (d. aft. 17 August 1316), a nun in Coswig.
- Princess Judith of Anhalt-Zerbst (d. aft. 17 August 1316), a nun in Coswig.
- Princess Konstanze of Anhalt-Zerbst (d. aft. 17 August 1316), a nun in Coswig.
- Princess Sophie of Anhalt-Zerbst (c.1260 - aft. 9 January 1290); married Ludwig of Hakeborn (c.1235 - 5 October 1298), son of Albrecht III, Count of Hackeborn
