= Rikissa Magnusdotter =

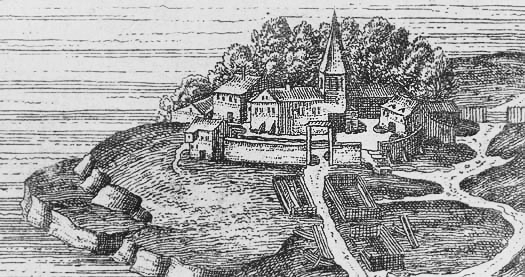
- Born: c. 1285
- Died: 17 December 1348 (aged 62–63); Stockholm
- House: Bjälbo
- Father: Magnus Ladulås
- Mother: Helvig of Holstein

Rikissa Magnusdotter (c. 1285 – 17 December 1348) was a Swedish princess. She was the daughter of King Magnus Ladulås of Sweden and his queen consort, Helvig of Holstein. At the age of six, she was entrusted to the nuns at St. Clara Priory (Sankta Klara kloster) in Stockholm. The nunnery had been given large donations and lands upon its foundation by King Magnus. Rikissa was the abbess of St. Clara Priory from at least 1335 until her death in 1348.

== Other sources ==
- Christer Engstrand (1976) Sverige och dess regenter under 1000 år (Stockholm: Bonnier AB) ISBN 978-9100415389
