= Erik Valdemarsson the Elder =

Swedish prince (1271/1272–1330)

The Coat of arms used by Erik and his descendants

Erik Valdemarsson the Elder (born 1271/1272; died 1330) was a Swedish prince and riksråd for Norway and Sweden. He was the son of King Valdemar of Sweden and Queen Sophia of Denmark. He is the progenitor of the Valdemarsgren branch of the House of Bjälbo. He married Ingeborg Knutsdotter (Aspenäsätten).

When his father was deposed in 1275 the three year old Erik was temporarily protected by the Norwegian earl Alv Erlingsson. Because he was a potential claimant to the throne he was held prisoner in the 1290s along with his father. In 1302 when there was a Swedish-Norwegian alliance and he was released from prison but he had to follow his cousin Eric Magnusson to Norway where he remained during the unrest in Sweden, he was appointed to the Norwegian government. He participated as a negotiator for Eric VI of Denmark and Haakon V of Norway against the Swedish dukes and Eric VI promised him Danish estates. He was mentioned as a knight and Norwegian Riksrad in 1308. When Haakon reconciled with Duke Eric Magnusson in 1310 it was agreed that he would receive estates in Sweden in compensation for the claims, but this never happened.

During the union of Sweden and Norway through King Magnus Eriksson, Erik's fortunes seemed to have improved and in 1319 he married the daughter of the Drost Knut Jonsson. In the summer of 1322 he was mentioned as a Swedish Riksrad second after the Drost. He tried again during the unrest in Denmark in 1327–1328 to assert his right of inheritance, but in vain.
