= Waldemar II of Anhalt-Zerbst =

German prince

Waldemar II, Prince of Anhalt-Zerbst (died bef. 24 August 1371) was a German prince of the House of Ascania and ruler of the Principality of Anhalt-Zerbst.

He was the eldest child and only son of Waldemar I, Prince of Anhalt-Zerbst by his first wife Elisabeth, daughter of Rudolf I, Elector of Saxony and Duke of Saxe-Wittemberg.

== Life ==
After the death of his father in 1368, Waldemar became the new co-ruler of the principality of Anhalt-Zerbst with his cousin John II. His reign only lasted four years. After his death unmarried and childless, he was succeeded by John II, who became the sole ruler over Anhalt-Zerbst.

Preceded by Waldemar I	Prince of Anhalt-Zerbst with John II; 1368–1371	Succeeded by John II
