= Erik Birgersson =

Swedish duke (c. 1250–1275)

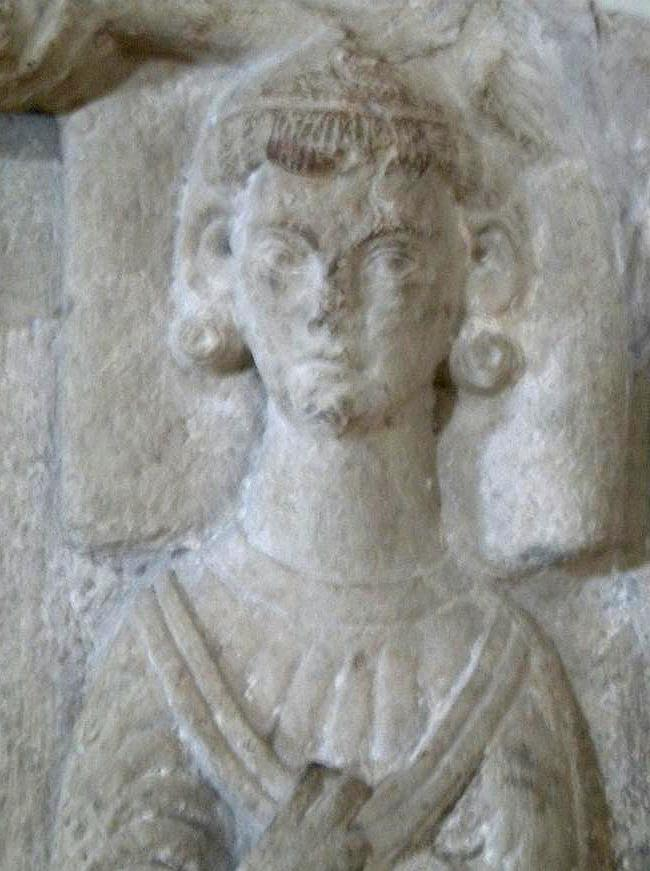
sculpture of Erik Birgersson on his grave

Erik Birgersson (c. 1250 – 17 December 1275) was a Swedish duke from the House of Bjälbo (Folkungaätten) and the third son of Birger Jarl. His eldest brother, Valdemar, was elected King of Sweden, while his second brother, Magnus, was made a duke. Unlike his brothers, Erik initially held no formal title, which became a source of frustration. Discontent over the distribution of power ultimately led him and Magnus to rebel against King Valdemar. Together, they defeated him at the Battle of Hova in 1275, resulting in Magnus being crowned king and Erik assuming the title of duke. However, Erik died only months after gaining his newfound position of power. It has been suggested that Erik may have suffered from Marfan syndrome, a genetic disorder affecting connective tissue.

== Biography ==
Erik, the third son of Birger Magnusson, widely known as Birger Jarl, was born into a powerful Swedish family. His father served as Jarl of Sweden from 1248 to 1266, while his mother, Ingeborg Eriksdotter, was the daughter of King Erik Knutsson and sister of King Erik Eriksson. In 1250, his eldest brother Valdemar was elected King of Sweden as a minor, with their father Birger effectively ruling as regent until his death in 1266.

Unlike his brothers, Erik did not initially receive a formal title. His second brother, Magnus (later known as Magnus Ladulås), was appointed iunior dux ("junior jarl") in 1255, while the youngest brother Bengt advanced within the clergy. According to the Magnúss saga lagabœtis, Erik referred to himself as Allsintet ('Nothing of anything') because of this. However, Erikskrönikan claims that this nickname was instead given by Queen Sofie, Valdemar's wife.

After Birger Jarl’s death, tensions arose between King Valdemar and his brothers. The Magnúss saga lagabœtis depicts Erik as the main instigator of the conflict, while Erikskrönikan attributes the blame to Magnus. By 1275, the discord had escalated into open warfare. Erik and Magnus, with the support of Danish troops, defeated Valdemar at the Battle of Hova. After the victory, Magnus was crowned king, and Erik was made Duke of Sweden, a role similar to Magnus’s under Valdemar. This elevation brought Erik a position of significant authority, but his prominence was short-lived—he died on 17 December 1275.

Erik was buried at Varnhem Abbey alongside his father Birger Jarl and his father's second wife, Mechtilde of Holstein. In May 2002, an archaeological examination of the grave by osteologist Torbjörn Ahlström of Lund University revealed three sets of remains, believed to be Birger, Mechtilde, and Erik. His father's skeleton was about 172 cm long, while Erik was a few inches longer but with a much thinner build. Erik's muscular attachments were poorly developed, and in the vertebrae and sternum there were some signs of pathological changes. Ahlström suggested that Erik may have had Marfan syndrome, a hereditary genetic disorder that affects the connective tissue. It has been speculated that his uncle, King Erik Eriksson, nicknamed "the lisp and the lame", may have had the same condition.
