= Principality of Anhalt-Dornburg =

European polity

Principality of Anhalt-Dornburg Fürstentum Anhalt-Dornburg
- 1667–1742
- Coat of arms

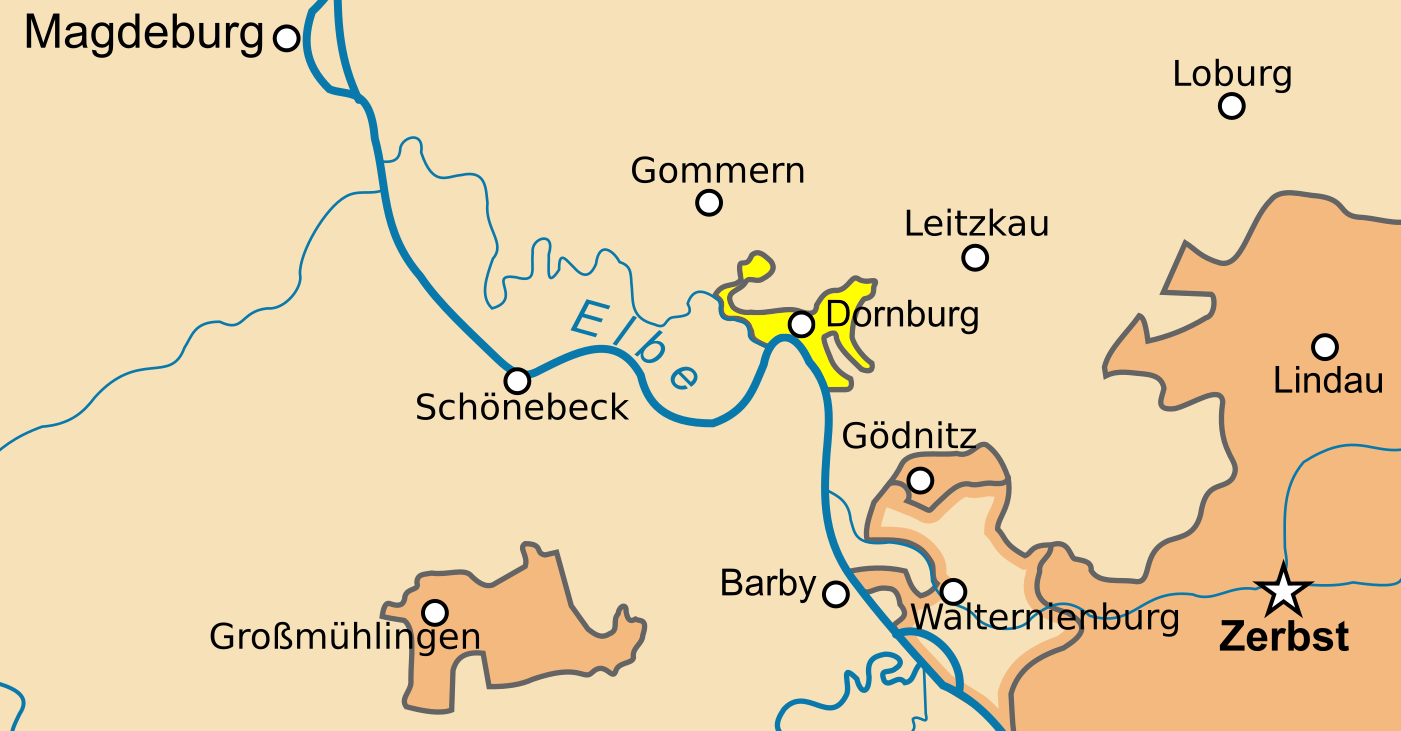
- The Principality of Anhalt-Dornburg (yellow) with Anhalt-Zerbst (orange).
- Status: Principality
- Capital: Dornburg
- Historical era: Middle Ages
  - Partitioned from Anhalt-Zerbst: 1667
  - Inherited Anhalt-Zerbst: 1742
Preceded by	Succeeded by
Principality of Anhalt-Zerbst	Principality of Anhalt-Zerbst

Anhalt-Dornburg was a small principality within the Holy Roman Empire, ruled by a collateral branch of the House of Anhalt.

== History ==
It was created in 1667 following the death of Prince John VI and the partition of Anhalt-Zerbst with Anhalt-Mühlingen being created along with Anhalt-Dornburg for the younger sons of Prince John VI. The principality lasted until 1742 when Princes Christian August and John Louis II inherited Anhalt-Zerbst.

== Princes of Anhalt-Dornburg 1667–1742 ==
- John Louis I 1667–1704
- John Louis II 1704–1742
- John Augustus 1704–1709 (co-regent)
- Christian Louis 1704–1710 (co-regent)
- John Frederick 1704–1742 (co-regent)
- Christian Augustus 1704–1742 (co-regent)

United with Anhalt-Zerbst in 1742.
