= Magnúss saga lagabœtis =

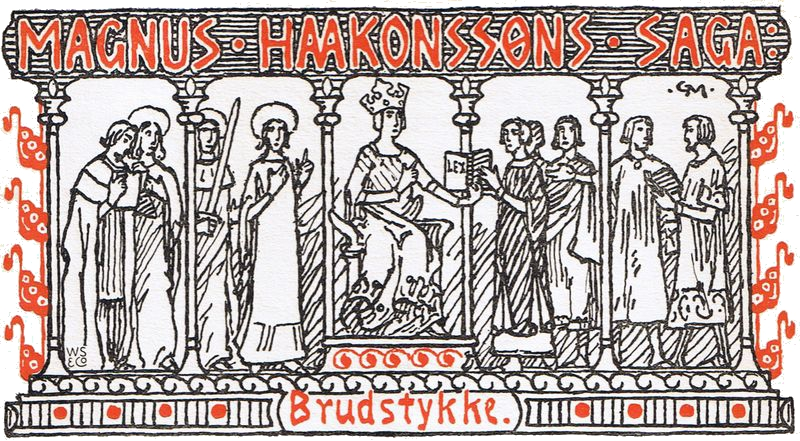
Magnus Haakonssøns saga

Magnúss saga lagabœtis (Magnus the Lawmender's saga) is an Old Norse kings' saga, concerning the life and reign of King Magnus VI the Lawmender of Norway. Only fragments of it survive today.

The saga was written by the Icelandic historian and chieftain Sturla Þórðarson. Sturla was in Norway in 1278, and it is assumed that he started work on the saga then, on request of King Magnus himself. He had earlier commissioned Sturla to write the saga of his father, Hákonar saga Hákonarsonar. There are indications that the saga's narrative continued until the death of King Magnus, which would have to mean that Sturla finished it in Iceland some time between King Magnus' death in 1280 and Sturla's death in 1284.

Only one leaf of parchment, from a 14th-century manuscript, survives of the saga today. In addition, some passages were copied into Icelandic annals, and have thus been passed down to us today. The small fragments we have show us glimpses of a realistic narrative style, written in strict chronological order, reminiscent of Sturla's work in Hákonar saga Hákonarsonar. It is not known whether the narrative started with Magnus' accession to the throne upon his father's death, thus continuing the narrative of Hákonar saga Hákonarsonar, or whether it started with Magnus' birth, as the beginning of the saga is not preserved.

Magnúss saga lagabœtis was one of the last kings' sagas to be written, and King Magnus was the last of the Norwegian kings to have his saga written.
