= Principality of Anhalt-Zerbst =

Principality in the Holy Roman Empire

Principality of Anhalt-Zerbst Fürstentum Anhalt-Zerbst (German)
- 1252–1396; 1544–1796
- 18th century arms of Anhalt-Zerbst

- Anhalt principalities (1747-1793), Zerbst in orange
- Status: State of the Holy Roman Empire
- Capital: Zerbst
- Common languages: Upper Saxon
- Government: Principality
- Historical era: Middle Ages
  - Partitioned from Anhalt: 1252
  - Partitioned into A-Dessau and A-Köthen: 1396
  - Partitioned from Anhalt-Dessau: 1544
  - Partitioned^{1}: 1603
  - Partitioned^{2}: 1667
  - Divided by A-Dessau, A-Köthen and A-Bernburg: 1796
  - Duchy of Anhalt reunited: 1863
Preceded by
Principality of Anhalt
Succeeded by
Anhalt-Dessau
Anhalt-Köthen
Anhalt-Bernburg
- 1: In 1603, Anhalt-Zerbst lost territory to Anhalt-Dessau, Anhalt-Bernburg, Anhalt-Plötzkau and Anhalt-Köthen. 2: In 1667, Anhalt-Zerbst lost territory to create Anhalt-Mühlingen and Anhalt-Dornburg.

Anhalt-Zerbst was a principality of the Holy Roman Empire ruled by the House of Ascania, with its residence at Zerbst in present-day Saxony-Anhalt. It emerged as a subdivision of the Principality of Anhalt from 1252 until 1396, when it was divided into the principalities of Anhalt-Dessau and Anhalt-Köthen. Recreated in 1544, Anhalt-Zerbst finally was partitioned between Anhalt-Dessau, Anhalt-Köthen, and Anhalt-Bernburg in 1796 upon the extinction of the line.

== History ==
It was created when the Anhalt territory was divided among the sons of Prince Henry I into the principalities of Anhalt-Aschersleben, Anhalt-Bernburg and Anhalt-Zerbst in 1252. In the course of the partition, Prince Siegfried I, the youngest son of Henry I, received the lands around Köthen, Dessau, and Zerbst. His son and successor Prince Albert I took his residence at Köthen Castle in 1295. In 1396, the surviving sons of Prince John II of Anhalt-Zerbst again divided their heritage: Sigismund I became Prince of Anhalt-Dessau and his younger brother Albert IV went on to rule as Prince of Anhalt-Köthen.

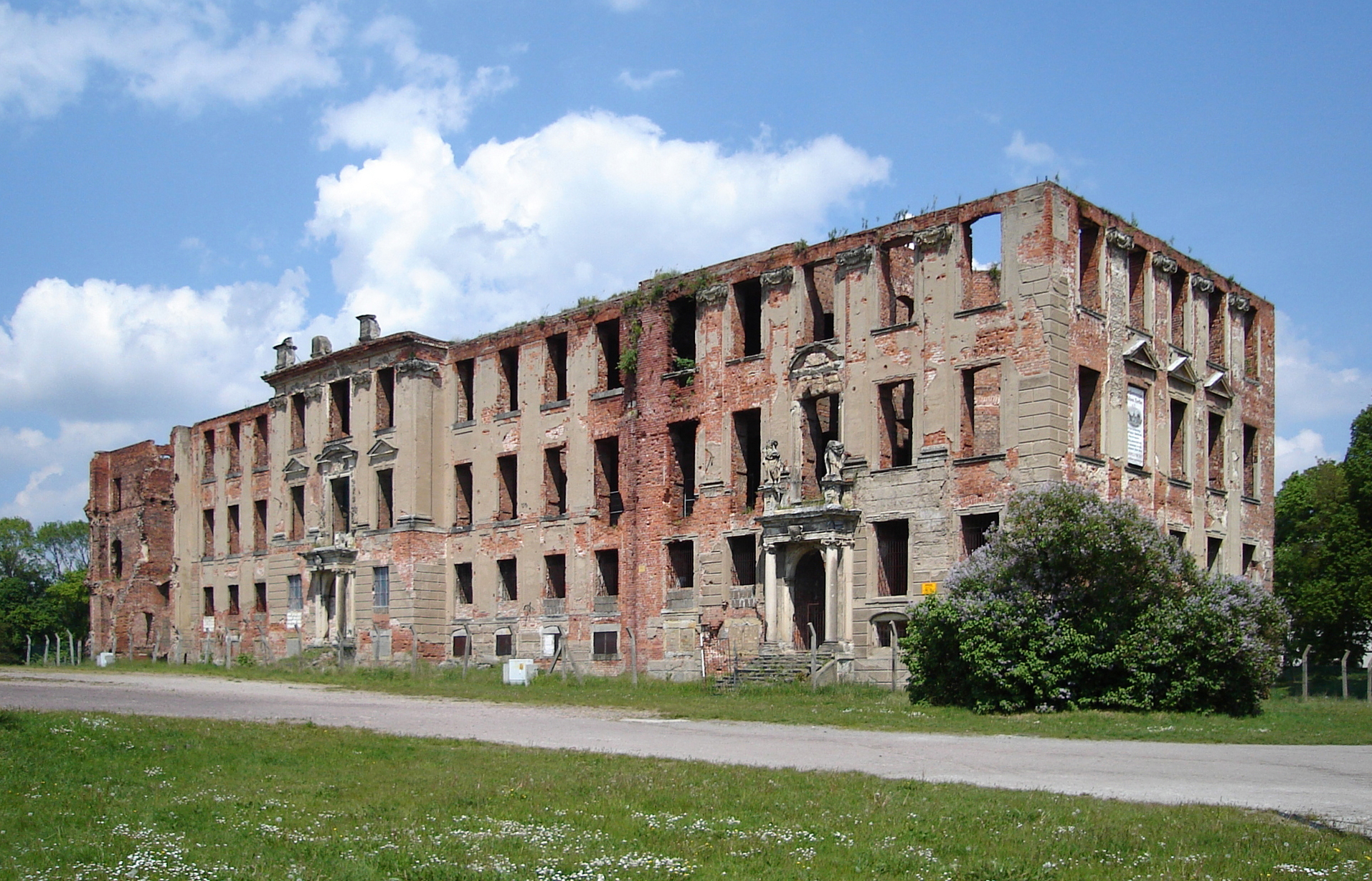
Ruins of Zerbst Castle

The principality was recreated, when in 1544 the heirs of Prince Ernest I of Anhalt-Dessau divided their territory and the eldest surviving son, Prince John V, took his residence at Zerbst Castle. The second incarnation, however, lost a lot of territory in 1603 when it was partitioned for a second time with some of its territory being given to Anhalt-Dessau, Anhalt-Bernburg, Anhalt-Plötzkau and Anhalt-Köthen.

By 1606, all Anhalt principalities had turned to the Reformed faith, however, Anhalt-Zerbst returned to Lutheranism in 1644. In 1667, Prince John VI inherited the remote Lordship of Jever in East Frisia. Upon his death in the same year, however, Anhalt-Zerbst lost more of its territory, with Anhalt-Mühlingen and Anhalt-Dornburg being created. The Jever lordship was administered by Ascanian relatives; it was hit hard by the Christmas Flood of 1717.

In 1742 princes John Louis II and Christian August of Anhalt-Zerbst-Dornburg inherited Anhalt-Zerbst. After Christian August's death in 1747, his widow Johanna Elisabeth of Holstein-Gottorp governed the country for her son Frederick Augustus until 1752. She had the new castle at Dornburg built as her thirds from 1750, a lavish baroque palace prepared to host her brother, Adolf Frederick, King of Sweden, or her daughter Sophie Auguste Fredericka, who in 1745 had married the Russian crown prince Peter III, to become empress in 1762, better known as Catherine the Great. However, neither of them ever visited her, and the dowager princess and her son were forced into exile when Prussian forces invaded Anhalt-Zerbst during the Seven Years' War in 1758. Frederick the Great, who had actually proposed the Russian marriage, accused the princess and her son of supporting Russia, then his war enemy. Johanna Elisabeth died in Paris in 1760 and her son, Frederick Augustus, never returned to Zerbst and continued to live in Basel and Luxemburg. Upon his death in 1793, the Principality of Anhalt-Zerbst came to an end. Its core territory was divided among the Ascanian princes of Anhalt-Dessau, Anhalt-Köthen, and Anhalt-Bernburg in 1797 while Jever was inherited by his sister, Catherine the Great, and remained under Russian rule until 1818 (except 1807-1813).

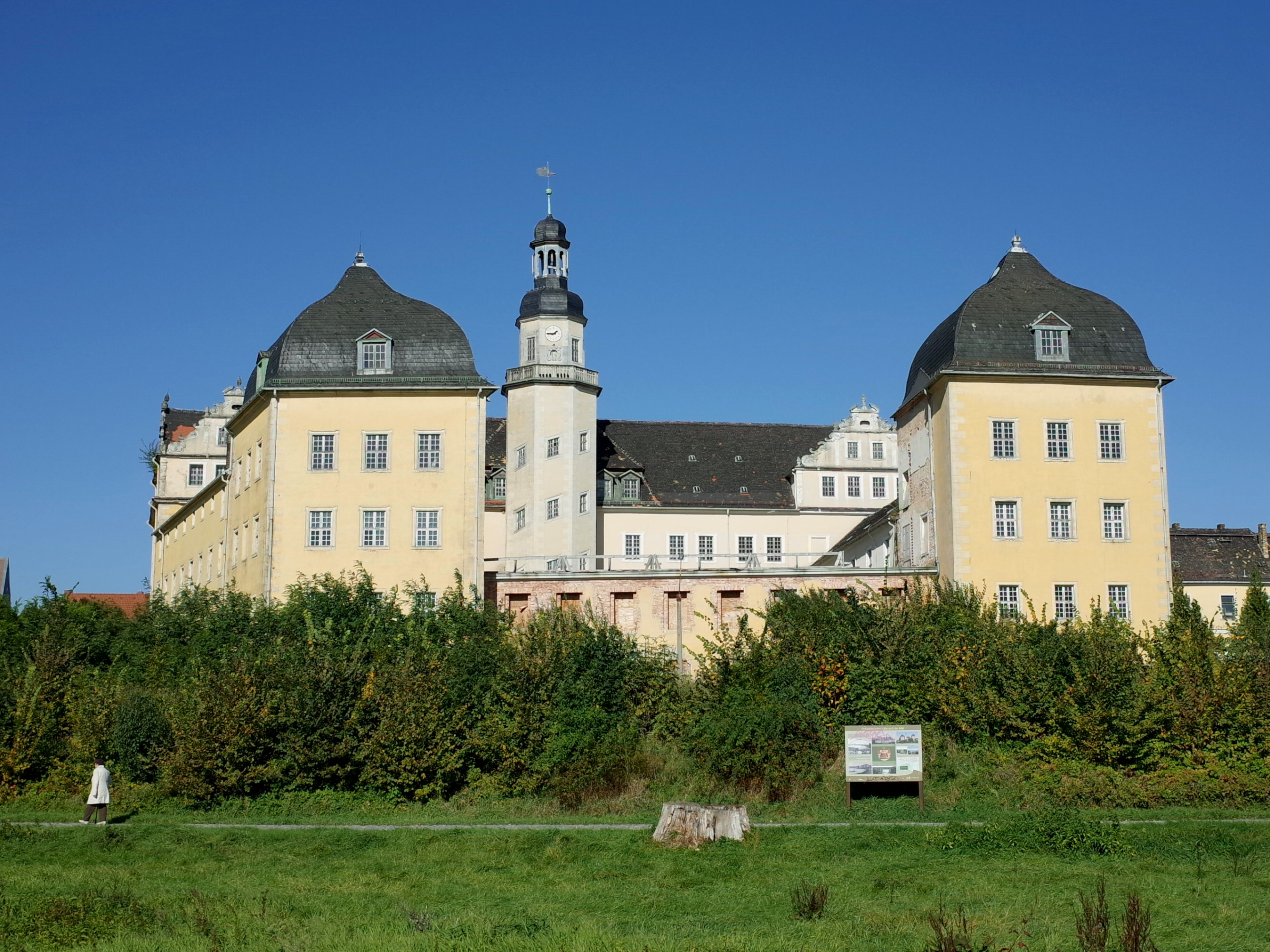
Coswig Castle

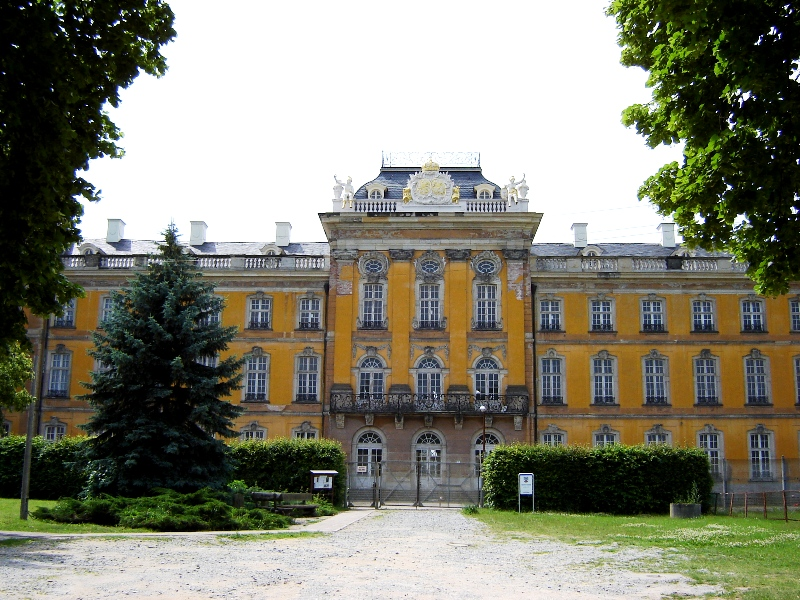
Dornburg Castle (near Gommern)

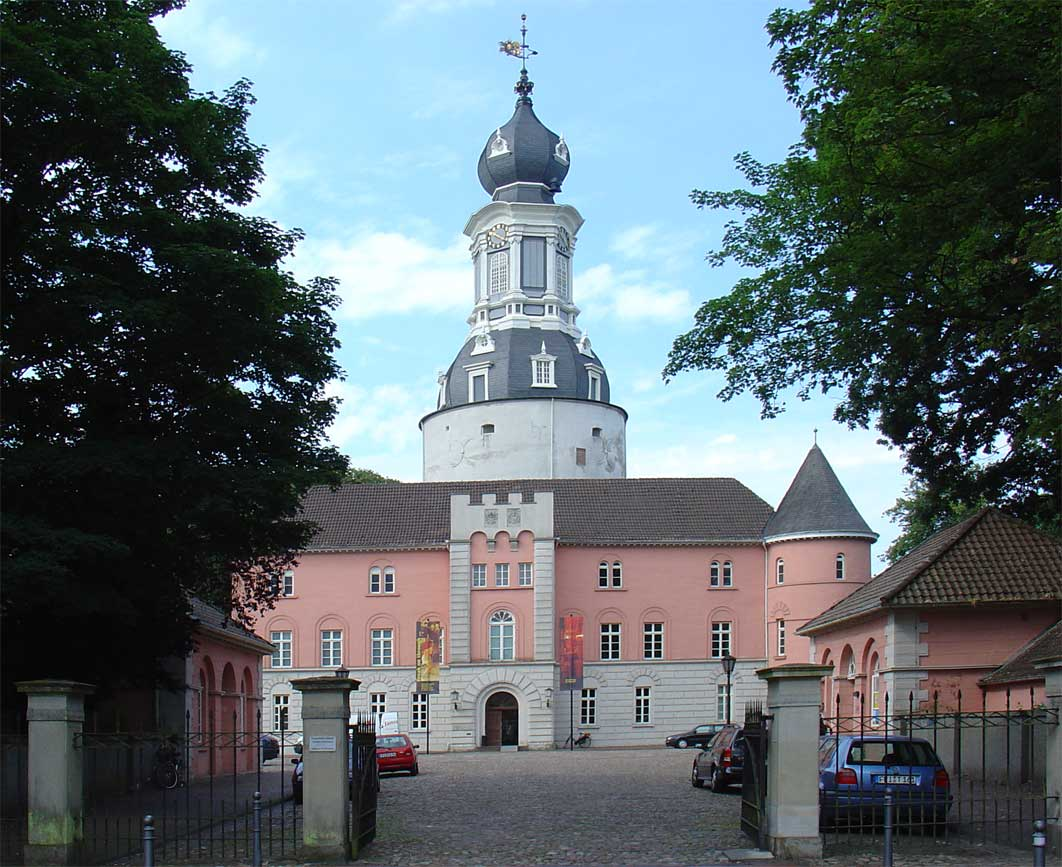
Jever Castle

== Princes of Anhalt-Zerbst ==
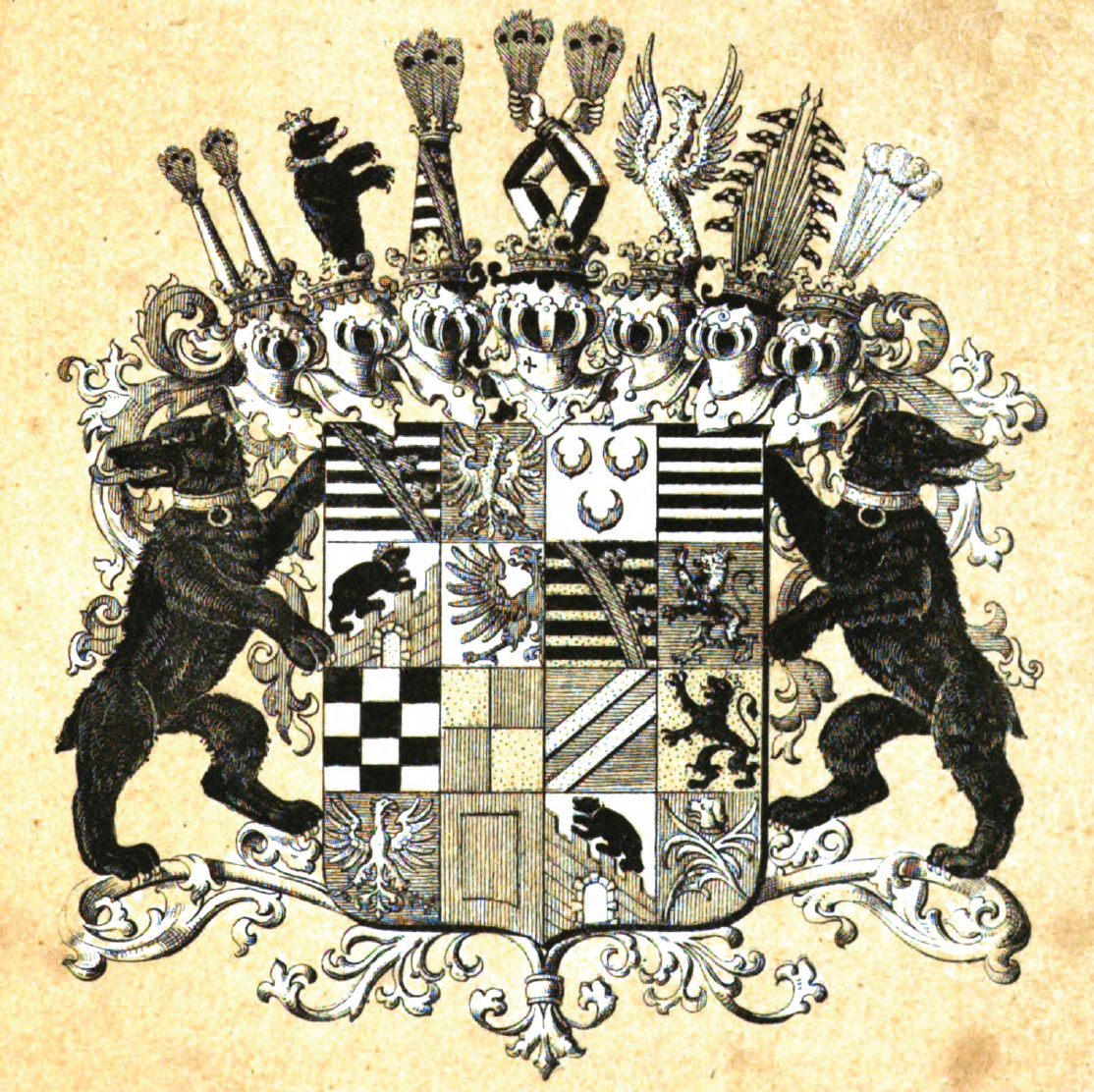
Coat of arms of the principality according to Siebmachers Wappenbuch, 1857

=== Princes, 1252–1396 ===
- Siegfried I 1252–1298
- Albert I 1298–1316
- Albert II 1316–1362
  - Albert III 1359 (co-regent)
- Waldemar I 1316–1368 (co-regent)
- Johann II 1362–1382
  - Waldemar II 1368–1371 (co-regent)
- Waldemar III 1382–1391 (co-regent)
- Sigismund I 1382–1396 (co-regent)
- Albert IV 1382–1396 (co-regent)

Partitioned between Anhalt-Dessau and Anhalt-Köthen in 1396.

=== Princes, 1544–1796 ===
- Johann V 1544–1551
- Karl I 1551–1561
  - Bernhard VII 1551–1570 (co-regent)
  - Joachim Ernest 1551–1586 (co-regent, later sole ruler; he unified all the Anhalt lands); later, his sons divided again Anhalt.
- Rudolph 1603–1621
- Johann VI 1621–1667
  - Augustus of Anhalt-Plötzkau regent 1621–1642
- Karl William 1667–1718
  - Sophie Auguste of Schleswig-Holstein-Gottorp regent 1667–1674
- Johann August 1718–1742
- Johann Ludwig II 1742–1746
  - Christian Augustus 1742–1747 (co-regent)
- Friedrich August 1747–1793
  - Joanna Elisabeth of Holstein-Gottorp regent 1747–1752
- Sophie Auguste Fredericke (Empress Catherine II of Russia) 1793–1796 (only in Jever)

To Anhalt-Dessau 1796.

== See also ==
- Anhalt-Zerbst
