= Albert III of Anhalt-Zerbst =

German prince

Albert III, Prince of Anhalt-Zerbst (died c. 1 August 1359) was a German prince of the House of Ascania and ruler of the principality of Anhalt-Zerbst. He was the eldest son of Albert II, Prince of Anhalt-Zerbst, by his second wife Beatrix, daughter of Rudolf I, Elector of Saxony and Duke of Saxe-Wittemberg.

== Life ==
During the life of his father, Albert was made co-ruler of the principality of Anhalt-Zerbst; at the same time, his uncle Waldemar I was also co-ruler with his residence at Dessau.

His reign apparently lasted only a few months, and he predeceased his father and uncle. His next brother Rudolf was ordained a priest, thus his father's heir and eventual successor was his youngest brother John II.

Preceded by Albert II	Prince of Anhalt-Zerbst with Waldemar I and Albert II; 1359	Succeeded by Albert II
