= Joachim Ernest, Prince of Anhalt =

German prince

Joachim Ernest
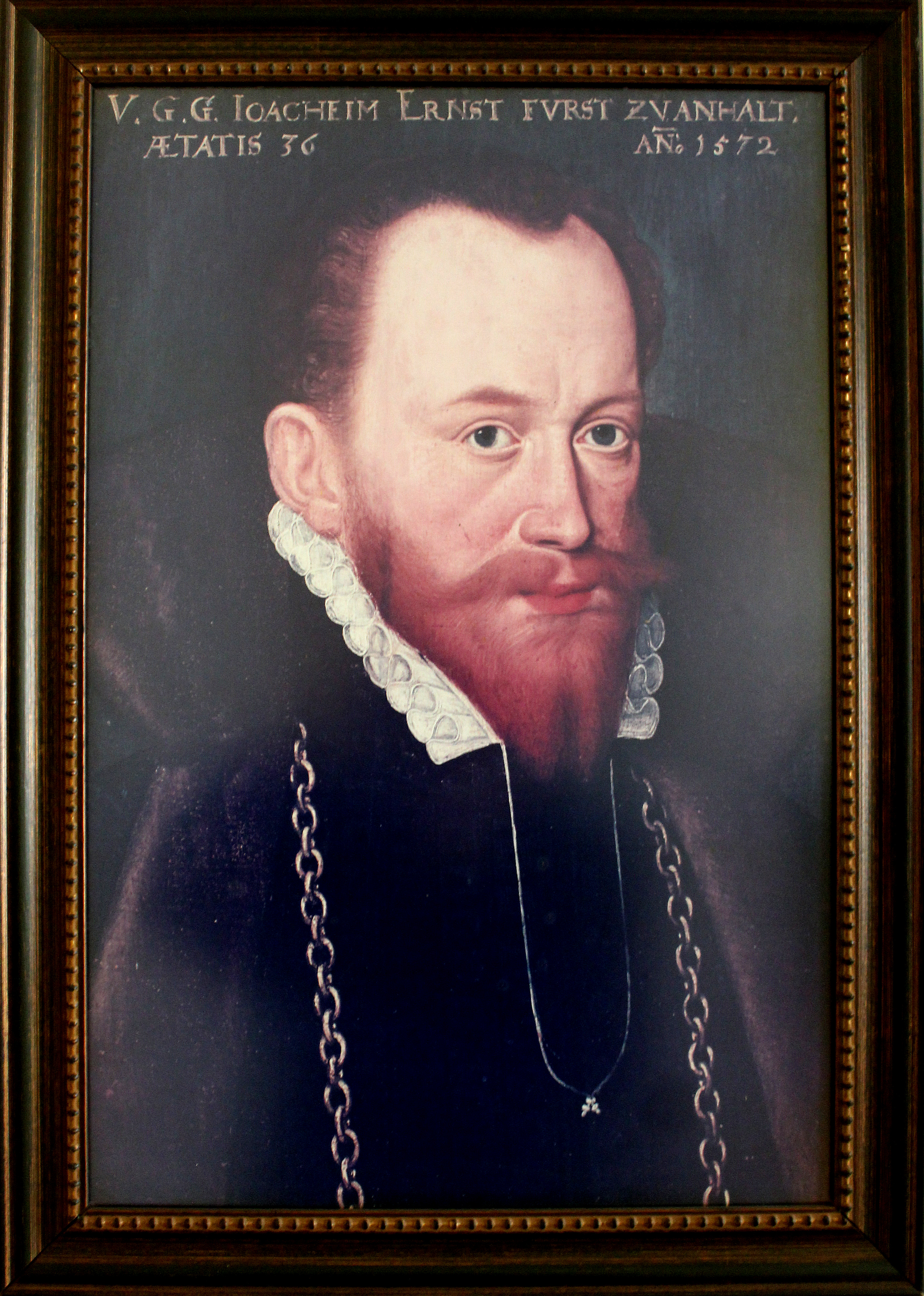

Prince of Anhalt-Zerbst
- Reign: 1551–1570
- Predecessor: John V
- Successor: none (unification of all Anhalt principalities in 1570)

Prince of Anhalt
- Predecessor: none (unification of all Anhalt principalities in 1570)
- Successor: John George I Christian I Bernhard; Augustus; Rudolph; John Ernest; Louis
- Born: 21 October 1536; Dessau
- Died: 6 December 1586 (aged 50); Dessau
- Spouse: Agnes of Barby-Mühlingen (m. 1560; died 1569) Eleonore of Württemberg (m. 1571)
- Issue more...: Anna Maria, Duchess of Legnica-Brzeg-Oława-Wołów; Elisabeth, Electress of Brandenburg; Sibylla, Duchess of Württemberg; John George I, Prince of Anhalt-Dessau; Christian I, Prince of Anhalt-Bernburg; Bernhard of Anhalt; Agnes Hedwig, Duchess of Schleswig-Holstein-Sonderburg; Dorothea Maria, Duchess of Saxe-Weimar; Augustus, Prince of Anhalt-Plötzkau; Rudolph, Prince of Anhalt-Zerbst; John Ernest of Anhalt; Louis I, Prince of Anhalt-Köthen; Sabine of Anhalt; Anna Sophie, Countess of Schwarzburg-Rudolstadt
- House: Ascania
- Father: John V, Prince of Anhalt-Zerbst
- Mother: Margaret of Brandenburg

Joachim Ernest of Anhalt (21 October 1536 – 6 December 1586), was a German prince of the House of Ascania, ruler of the principality of Anhalt-Zerbst from 1551, and from 1570 sole ruler of all the Anhalt lands.

== Life ==
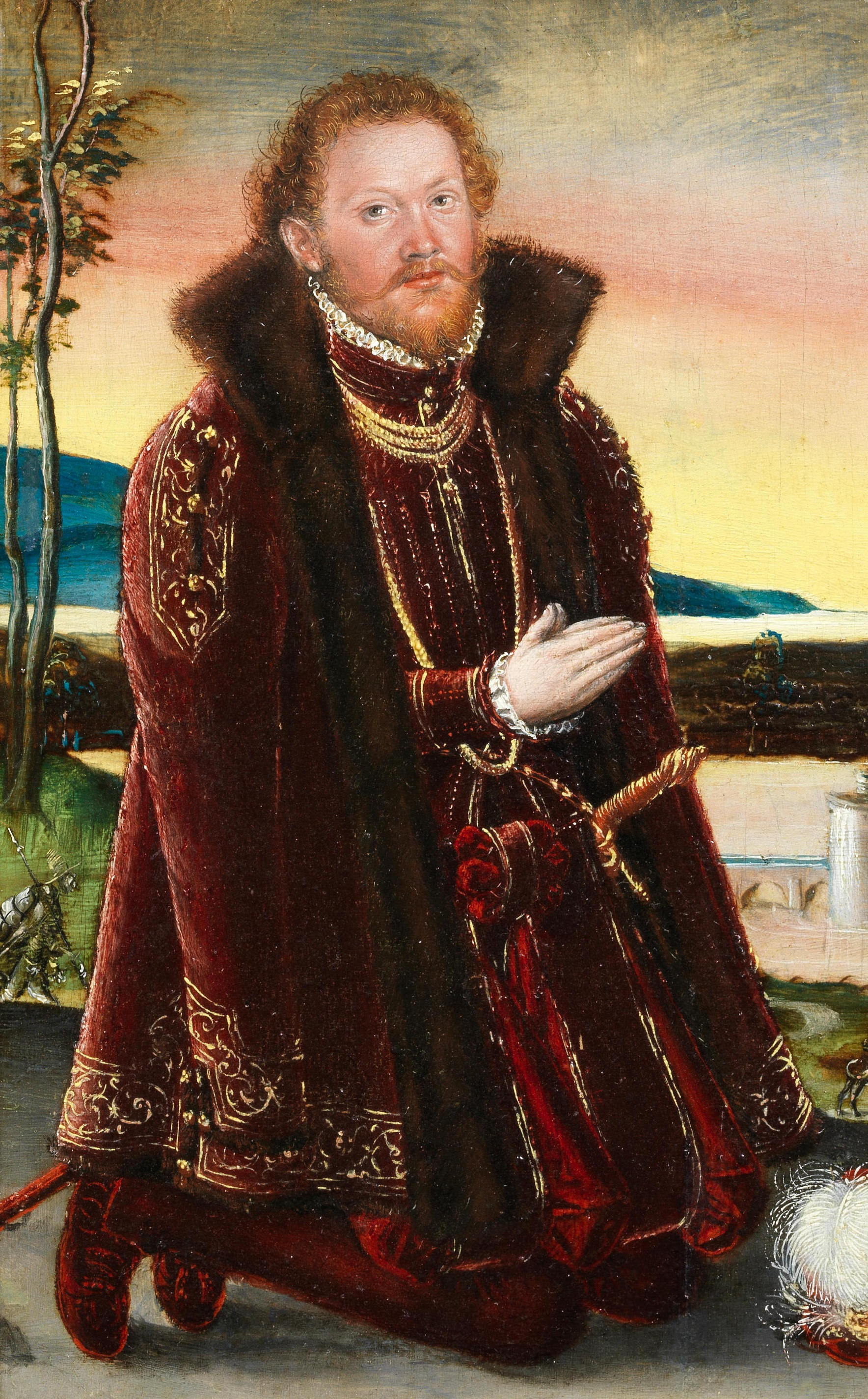
Portrait of Joachim Ernest by Lucas Cranach the Younger, 1560

=== Early life ===
Joachim Ernest was born in Dessau on 21 October 1536 as the second son of John V, Prince of Anhalt-Zerbst, by his wife Margaret, daughter of Joachim I Nestor, Elector of Brandenburg. He received an extensive education under the supervision of his father. On 1 February 1549, just thirteen years of age, he was officially admitted to the University of Wittenberg, where, among others, he studied with the theologian Georg Helt.

=== Prince of Anhalt-Zerbst ===
In 1550, after the death of his father, he inherited Anhalt-Zerbst along with his older brother Karl I and his younger brother Bernhard VII.

The death of his uncle George III without male heirs permitted him and his brothers, Karl I and Bernhard VII, to inherit Anhalt-Plötzkau in 1553, while the death of his uncle Joachim I permitted him and his surviving brother Bernhard VII to inherit Anhalt-Dessau in 1561. In 1562 his cousin Wolfgang abdicated Anhalt-Köthen in his favor.

=== Marriages ===
In Barby on 3 March 1560 Joachim Ernest married Agnes of Barby-Mühlingen (b. Barby, 23 June 1540 – d. Bernburg, 27 November 1569), daughter of Wolfgang I, Count of Barby-Mühlingen (1502–1564) and his wife, Countess Agnes of Mansfeld (1511–1558). They had six children.

In Stuttgart on 9 January 1571 Joachim Ernest married for a second time to Eleonore (b. Tübingen, 22 March 1552 – d. Schloss Lichtenberg, 12 January 1618), daughter of Christoph, Duke of Württemberg and his wife, Princess Anna Maria of Brandenburg-Ansbach. They had ten children.

=== Sole ruler of Anhalt ===
In 1570 the death of his last surviving brother, Bernhard VII, left him as sole ruler of all the Anhalt states, which were finally unified for the first time since their first partition in 1252. Joachim Ernest made Dessau the seat of his government.

Joachim Ernest was a typical Renaissance monarch who generously supported the arts and culture. He sent his sons with their tutors on educational journeys across Europe. Also, he ordered the son of his chancellor, Tobias Hübner, to create a description of the famous knight's games (German: Ritterspiele) that took place at the Dessau court.

In 1572 he created the Regional Legal Code of Anhalt (German: Landesverordnung Anhalts) and in 1582 he founded the Francisceum High School (German: Gymnasium Francisceum) in Zerbst. He was a fervent supporter of the Reformation and the Huguenots.

=== Death and succession ===
Prince Joachim Ernest died in Dessau on 6 December 1586. Since succession in the territories of Anhalt was not governed by the rules of primogeniture, Joachim Ernest's seven sons shared rule of the territories of Anhalt until 1603, when the five surviving sons divided their lands among themselves.

== Issue ==
Name	Birth	Death	Notes
By Agnes of Barby-Mühlingen
Anna Maria	Zerbst, 13 June 1561	Brzeg, 14 November 1605	married on 19 May 1577 to Joachim Frederick, Duke of Legnica-Brzeg-Oława-Wołów
Agnes	Zerbst, 16 September 1562	Bernburg, 4 June 1564
Elisabeth of Anhalt-Zerbst	Zerbst, 25 September 1563	Crossen, 5 October 1607	married on 6 October 1577 to John George, Elector of Brandenburg
Sibylla	Bernburg, 28 September 1564	Leonberg, 26 October 1614	married on 22 May 1581 to Frederick I, Duke of Württemberg
John George I, Prince of Anhalt-Dessau	Harzgerode, 9 May 1567	Dessau, 24 May 1618	married on 22 February 1588 to Countess Dorothea of Mansfeld-Arnstein, and secondly on 21 February 1595 to Countess Palantine Dorothea of Pfalz-Simmern
Christian I, Prince of Anhalt-Bernburg	Bernburg, 11 May 1568	Bernburg, 17 April 1630	married on 2 July 1595 to Countess Anna of Bentheim-Steinfurt-Tecklenburg-Limburg
By Eleonore of Württemberg
Bernhard, Prince of Anhalt	b. Dessau, 25 September 1571	Klosterhof bei Tyrnau, 24 November 1596)
Agnes Hedwig	Dessau, 12 March 1573	Sonderburg, 3 November 1616)	married on 3 January 1586 to Augustus, Elector of Saxony, and secondly on 14 February 1588 to John II, Duke of Schleswig-Holstein-Sonderburg
Dorothea Maria	Dessau, 2 July 1574	Weimar, 18 July 1617	married on 7 January 1593 to John II, Duke of Saxe-Weimar
Augustus, Prince of Anhalt-Plötzkau	Dessau, 14 July 1575	Plötzkau, 22 August 1653)	married on 25 January 1618 to Countess Sibylle of Solms-Laubach
Rudolph, Prince of Anhalt-Zerbst	Harzgerode, 28 October 1576	Zerbst, 30 July 1621	married on 29 December 1605 to Dorothea Hedwig of Brunswick-Wolfenbüttel, and secondly on 31 August 1612 to Countess Magdalene of Oldenburg-Delmenhorst
John Ernest, Prince of Anhalt	Dessau, 1 May 1578	Vienna, 22 December 1601
Louis I, Prince of Anhalt-Köthen	Dessau, 17 June 1579	Köthen, 7 January 1650	married on 31 October 1606 to Countess Amöena Amalie of Bentheim-Steinfurt-Tecklenburg-Limburg, and secondly on 12 September 1626 to Countess Sophie of Lippe
Sabine	Dessau, 7 November 1580	Darmstadt, 28 March 1599
Joachim Christoph	Dessau, 7 July 1582	Dessau, 16 July 1583
Anna Sophie	Dessau, 15 June 1584	Oberkranichfeld, 9 June 1652)	married on 13 June 1613 to Charles Günther, Count of Schwarzburg-Rudolstadt

== Ancestors ==
Ancestors of Joachim Ernest, Prince of Anhalt

8. George I, Prince of Anhalt-Dessau
4. Ernest I, Prince of Anhalt-Dessau
9. Anna of Lindau-Ruppin
2. John V, Prince of Anhalt-Zerbst
10. Henry I, Duke of Münsterberg-Oels
5. Margaret of Münsterberg-Oels
11. Ursula of Brandenburg
1. Joachim Ernest, Prince of Anhalt
12. John Cicero, Elector of Brandenburg
6. Joachim I Nestor, Elector of Brandenburg
13. Margaret of Thuringia
3. Margaret of Brandenburg
14. John of Denmark
7. Elizabeth of Denmark (1485–1555)
15. Christina of Saxony

== Literature ==
- Johann Christoph Beckmann: Historie des Fürstenthums Anhalt. 7 Tle. Zerbst 1710. (Ndr. Dessau 1995).
- Gerhard Heine: Geschichte des Landes Anhalt und seiner Fürsten, Heine, 1866, S. 98 ff.
- Berent Schwineköper (1974). "Joachim Ernst". Neue Deutsche Biographie (in German). Vol. 10. Berlin: Duncker & Humblot. p. 433. (full text online).
- Ferdinand Siebigk: Das Herzogthum Anhalt, Desbarats, 1867, S. 207 ff.

Joachim Ernest, Prince of Anhalt House of Ascania Born: 21 October 1536 Died: 6 December 1586
Preceded by John V	Prince of Anhalt-Zerbst with Karl I (until 1561) and Bernhard VII; 1551–1570	Succeeded by Unification of all Anhalt Principalities
Preceded by George III	Prince of Anhalt-Plötzkau with Karl I (until 1561) and Bernhard VII; 1553–1570	Succeeded by Unification of all Anhalt Principalities
Preceded by Joachim I	Prince of Anhalt-Dessau with Bernhard VII; 1561–1570	Succeeded by Unification of all Anhalt Principalities
Preceded by Wolfgang	Prince of Anhalt-Köthen with Bernhard VII; 1562–1570	Succeeded by Unification of all Anhalt Principalities
Preceded by Principality created	Prince of Anhalt; 1570–1586	Succeeded by John George I Christian I Bernhard; Augustus; Rudolph; John Ernest; Louis
