= Anhalt-Köthen =

Holy Roman principality

Principality (Duchy) of Anhalt-Köthen Fürstentum (Herzogtum) Anhalt-Köthen
- 1396–1562; 1603–1853
- Flag Coat of arms

- The Anhalt principalities, 1747–1793, with Anhalt-Köthen in pink
- Status: State of the Holy Roman Empire (until 1806); Member of the Confederation of the Rhine (1807–13); Member of the German Confederation (from 1815)
- Capital: Köthen
- Government: Principality
- Prince
  - 1396–1423: Albert IV (first)
  - 1789–1806: Augustus Christian Frederick (last)
- Historical era: Middle Ages
  - Partitioned from Anhalt-Zerbst: 1396
  - Inherited by Anhalt-Dessau: 1562
  - Partitioned from Anhalt-Zerbst: 1603
  - Partitioned to create Anhalt-Pless: 1774
  - Raised to duchy: 1806
  - Anhalt-Köthen line extinct: 23 November 1847
  - Officially merged with Anhalt-Dessau: 22 May 1853
  - Duchy of Anhalt reunited: 1863
| Preceded by | Succeeded by |
| Principality of Anhalt-Zerbst | Anhalt-Dessau |
- Today part of: Germany

Anhalt-Köthen [ˈʔanhalt ˈkøːtn] was a principality of the Holy Roman Empire ruled by the House of Ascania. It was created in 1396 when the Principality of Anhalt-Zerbst was partitioned between Anhalt-Dessau and Anhalt-Köthen. The first creation lasted until 1562, when it fell to Prince Joachim Ernest of Anhalt-Zerbst, who merged it into the reunited Principality of Anhalt.

Anhalt-Köthen was created a second time in 1603, when Anhalt was again divided. In 1806, Anhalt-Köthen was raised to a duchy. With the death of Duke Henry on 23 November 1847, the Anhalt-Köthen line became extinct and its territories were united to Anhalt-Dessau by patent of 22 May 1853. Today, Anhalt-Köthen is mostly remembered as a long-time residence of Johann Sebastian Bach, while he worked for Leopold, Prince of Anhalt-Köthen.

== History ==
Anhalt after being divided among the sons of Henry I, 1259

The Principality of Anhalt arose in 1212 under its first ruler, Henry I, son of the Saxon duke Bernhard III. Named after Anhalt Castle, the ancestral seat of the Ascanian dynasty near Harzgerode, the principality experienced a number of partitions throughout its centuries-long existence. When Henry died in 1252, his sons divided their heritage, with the younger, Prince Siegfried I receiving the Anhalt-Zerbst territory including Dessau and Köthen.

=== First creation ===
The Principality of Anhalt-Köthen emerged in 1396, when the two surviving sons of late Prince John II of Anhalt-Zerbst divided their heritage and the younger, Prince Albert IV, took his residence at Köthen. Upon the death of his elder brother Prince Sigismund I of Anhalt-Dessau in 1405, Albert also acted as a regent for Sigismund's minor sons. He himself died in 1423 and was succeeded by his sons Adolph I and Waldemar V. Waldemar died in 1436 and Adolph entered a long-time quarrel with their cousin Prince George I of Anhalt-Dessau, finally in 1471, both concluded a succession contract whereby George took over the government of half the principality and became co-ruler as Lord of Köthen.

When Adolph's younger brother, Prince Albert VI, succeeded in 1473, he had to share the rule over Anhalt-Köthen with George's sons, Prince Waldemar VI and George II. While George II soon after entered the service of Elector Albrecht Achilles of Brandenburg, Waldemar was able to regain the pawned territory of Hoym and also added Burgscheidungen to his possessions. Albert VI died in 1475 and was succeeded by his only son Philip, with his cousins Magnus and Adolph II, the sons of Adolph I, as co-rulers. Philip died in 1500 and his cousins formally abdicated in 1508 in favour of Waldemar's son and heir Wolfgang, then sole ruler of Anhalt-Köthen.

Prince Wolfgang met with Martin Luther at the 1521 Diet of Augsburg and implemented the Protestant Reformation in his territories; the second Prince of the Holy Roman Empire to do so after the Saxon elector Frederick the Wise. He also became a leading member of the Protestant League of Torgau and the Schmalkaldic League against the policies of the Habsburg emperor Charles V. Temporarily banned, his possessions were restored in the 1552 Peace of Passau. Without heirs, Wolfgang in 1562 ceded Anhalt-Köthen to his cousins Joachim Ernest and Bernhard VII of Anhalt-Zerbst. Upon Bernhard's death in 1570, all Anhalt territories were formally re-united under Joachim Ernest's rule.

=== Second creation ===
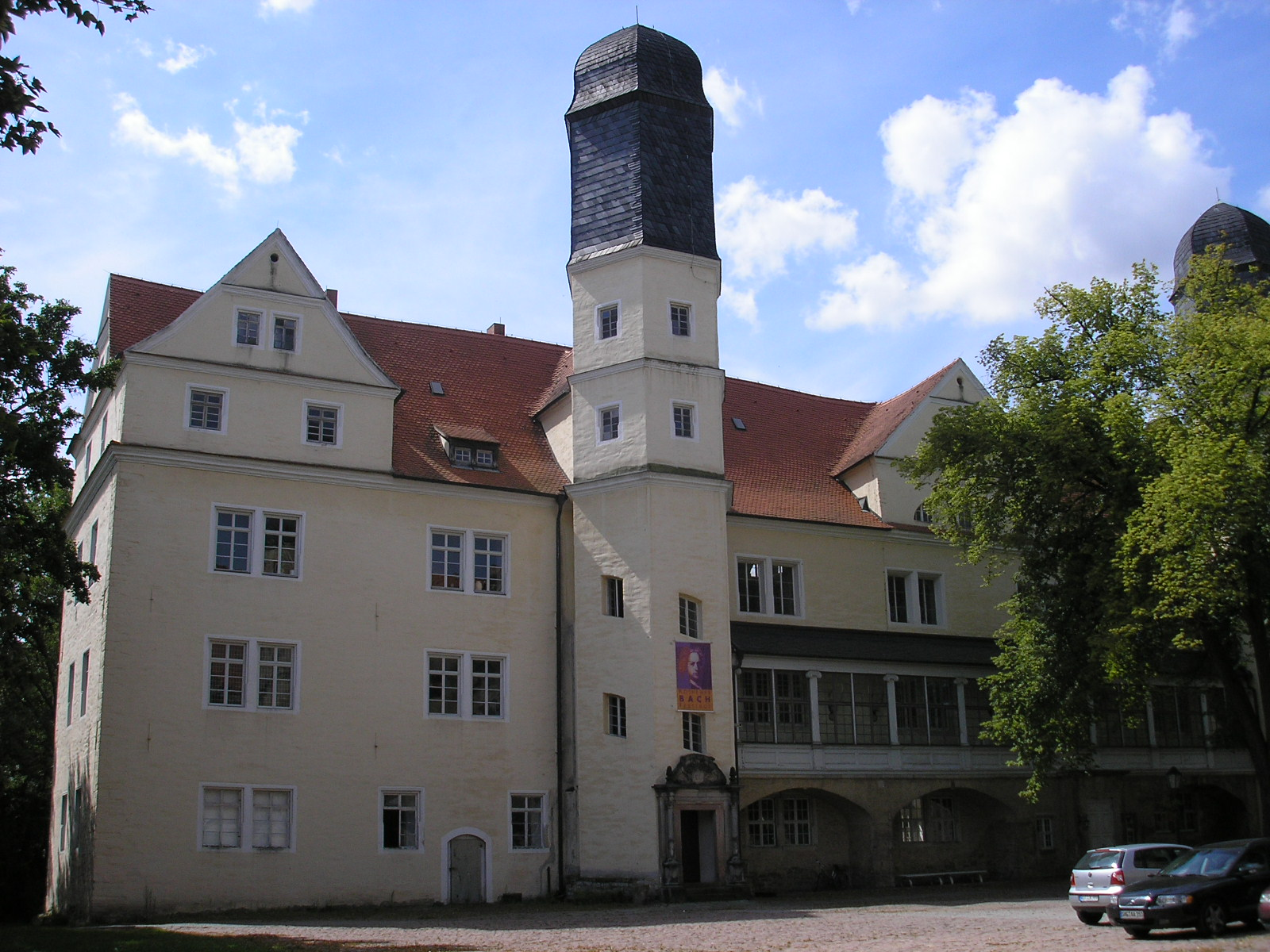
Schloss Köthen

Prince Joachim Ernest died in 1586, and his sons first ruled jointly. In 1603, however, the five surviving brothers again divided their heritage, with Anhalt-Köthen recreated for Prince Louis I. The partition was consummated until 1606, while the Louis' eldest brother Prince John George I of Anhalt-Dessau formally remained the head of all Anhalt principalities. Louis turned out to be a capable ruler; in 1617 he founded the literary Fruitbearing Society and became its first president, he worked with Wolfgang Ratke to implement educational reforms and had Schloss Köthen rebuilt. When he died in 1650, his son and successor William Louis was still a minor with Prince Augustus of Anhalt-Plötzkau and, from 1653, his sons Leberecht and Emmanuel acting as regents.

As William Louis' marriage with Elizabeth Charlotte had remained childless, he was succeeded by Leberecht and Emmanuel upon his death in 1665. From 1671 Emmanuel's son Emmanuel Lebrecht became sole rule of Anhalt-Köthen, initially under the guardianship of his mother Princess Anna Eleonore and Prince John George II of Anhalt-Dessau. He took over the government in 1692 and entered into a morganatic marriage with Gisela Agnes of Rath, elevated to a Reichsgräfin of Nienburg by Emperor Leopold I in 1694.

When Emmanuel Lebrecht died in 1704, he was succeeded by his second-born but eldest surviving son Leopold. Also a minor at his father's death, his mother Gisela Agnes acted as regent, supervised by King Frederick I of Prussia. Leopold came of age in 1715; he was a great patron of the arts, founded the Köthen court orchestra and, in 1717, employed Johann Sebastian Bach as Kapellmeister. Bach stayed in Köthen until 1723, where he worked with violinist Christian Ferdinand Abel and met with singer Anna Magdalena Wilcke, who became his second wife in 1721. Prince Leopold died in 1728 at the age of 33; as he left no sons, his principality fell to his brother Augustus Louis.

Upon his death in 1755, Prince Augustus Louis was succeeded by his second-born son Karl George Leberecht. During the Seven Years' War, Karl George tried to ease the impact on his principality; in 1751 he joined the Prussian Army and became a general in the Habsburg Imperial Army in 1789; soon after he was killed in the Siege of Belgrade. He was succeeded by his son Augustus Christian, who received parts of the extinct Principality of Anhalt-Zerbst in 1793 and was elevated to a duke (Herzog) by Napoleon in 1806. Anhalt-Köthen became a member of the German Confederation of the Rhine in 1807. Prince Augustus Christian died in 1812, and the ducal title passed to his minor nephew Louis Augustus Karl Frederick Emil, son of Prince Louis, himself the younger brother of Prince Augustus Louis. Duke Leopold III of Anhalt-Dessau acted as regent, however, Louis Augustus died in 1818 at the age of 16, leaving no heirs.

=== Anhalt-Köthen-Pless ===
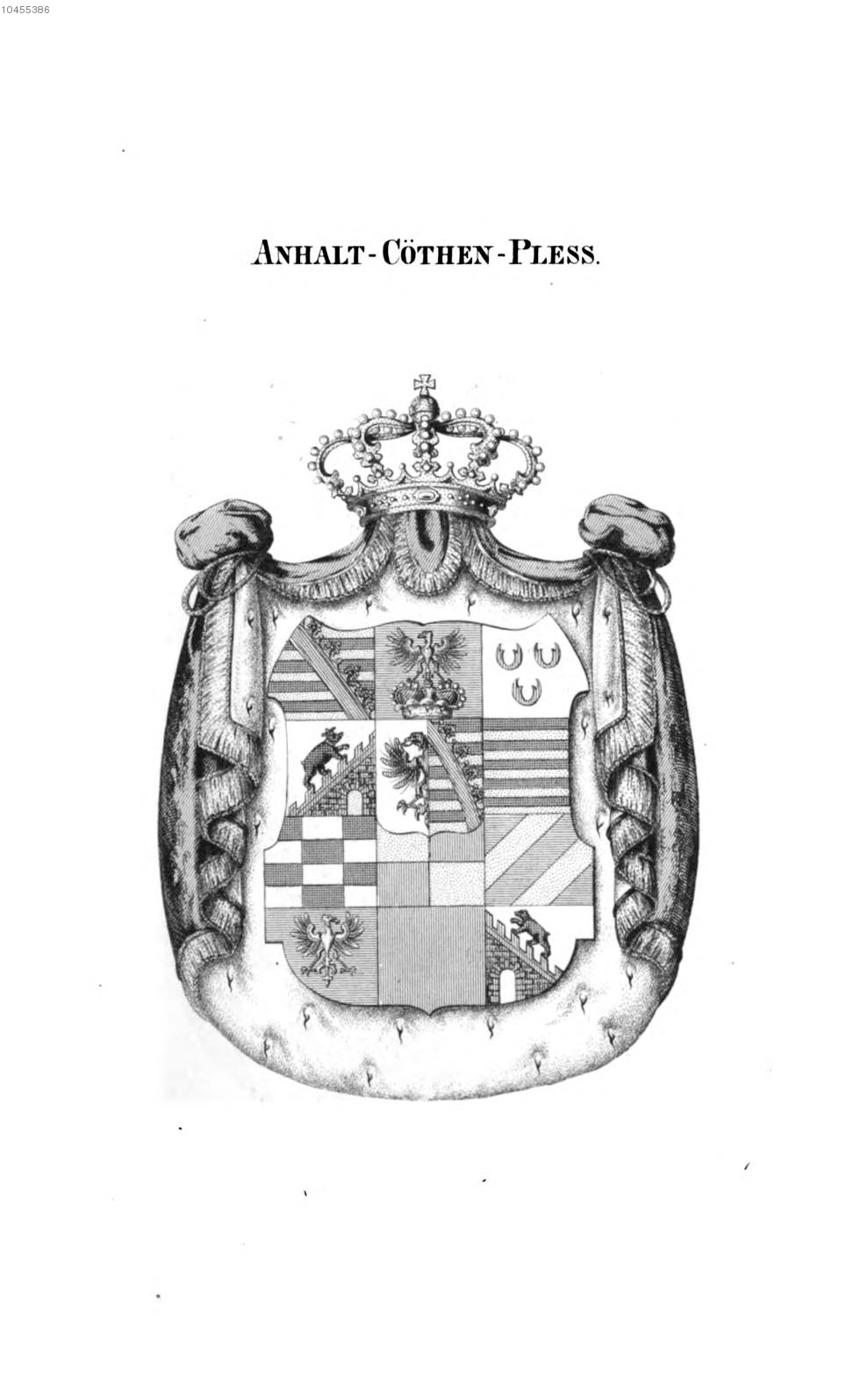
Coat of arms of Anhalt-Köthen-Pless

In 1765, Frederick Erdmann, the youngest son of Prince Augustus Louis, had received the Silesian state country in the former Duchy of Pless from the hands of his maternal uncle, Count John Erdmann of Promnitz. From that time on, he styled himself as Prince of Anhalt-Köthen-Pless.

His son, Frederick Ferdinand, inherited the princely title in 1797. Upon the early death in 1818 of Louis Augustus, Duke of Anhalt-Köthen, Frederick Ferdinand inherited the ducal title of Anhalt-Köthen. He then ceded Pless to his younger brother, Henry.

Upon Frederick Ferdinand's death in 1830, Henry succeeded him as Duke of Anhalt-Köthen. He left Pless to the youngest brother, Louis, who predeceased him in 1841. With Henry's death in 1847, the Anhalt-Köthen line became extinct, and all territories passed to Duke Leopold IV of Anhalt-Dessau.

== Princes of Anhalt-Köthen (1396–1562) ==
- Albert IV 1396–1423
- Adolph I 1423–1473
- Waldemar V 1423–1436 (co-regent)
- Waldemar VI 1471–1508 (Anhalt-Dessau line)
- Albert VI 1473–1475
- Philip 1475–1500
- Magnus 1475–1508 (co-regent, son of Adolph I) (d. 1524)
- Adolph II 1475–1508 (co-regent, son of Adolph I) (d. 1526)
- Wolfgang 1508–1562 (d. 1566)

To Prince Joachim Ernest of Anhalt-Zerbst.

== Princes of Anhalt-Köthen (1603–1806) ==
- Louis 1603–1650
  - Augustus of Anhalt-Plötzkau regent 1650–1653
  - Lebrecht and Emmanuel of Anhalt-Plötzkau joint regents 1653–1659
- William Louis 1650–1665
- Lebrecht 1665–1669
- Emmanuel 1665–1670 (co-ruler)
  - Anna Eleonore of Stolberg-Wernigerode regent 1670–1690
  - John George II of Anhalt-Dessau regent 1690–1692
- Emmanuel Lebrecht 1671–1704
  - Gisela Agnes of Rath regent 1704–1715
- Leopold 1704–1728
- Augustus Louis 1728–1755
- Karl George Lebrecht 1755–1789
- Augustus Christian Frederick 1789–1806

Raised to Duchy 1806.

== Dukes of Anhalt-Köthen (1806–1847) ==
Coat of arms (1846)

- Augustus Christian Frederick 1806–1812
- Louis Augustus Karl Frederick Emil 1812–1818
  - Leopold III of Anhalt-Dessau regent 1812–1817
  - Leopold IV of Anhalt-Dessau regent 1817–1818
- Frederick Ferdinand 1818–1830
- Henry 1830–1847

To Duke Leopold IV of Anhalt-Dessau
