= Magnus, Prince of Anhalt-Köthen =

German prince

Magnus, Prince of Anhalt-Köthen (1455 – 29 October 1524) was a German prince of the House of Ascania and ruler of the principality of Anhalt-Köthen.

He was the third (but eldest surviving) son of Adolph I, Prince of Anhalt-Köthen, by his wife Cordula, daughter of Albert III, Count of Lindau-Ruppin.

== Life ==
By 1471 Magnus had made clear his intention to become a priest along with his younger brothers William (who renounced his rights of succession) and Adolph II. This forced their father into a succession agreement with the Anhalt-Dessau branch of the House of Ascania, headed at that time by George I, Prince of Anhalt-Dessau.

Adolph I died in 1473 and was succeeded by his half-brother Albert VI and Waldemar VI of Anhalt-Dessau. Fifteen months later Albert died to be succeeded by his only son Philip. Magnus (already a Canon of Magdeburg) and his brother Adolph II also inherited Köthen; both used the title of "Lord of Zerbst" in allusion to the portion of the principality that was under their charge.

Without any interest in the government of the principality, Magnus' reign was nominal, but it was only in 1508 that he formally abdicated along with his brother Adolph II.

Preceded by Albert VI	Prince of Anhalt-Köthen with Philip (until 1500), Adolph II and Waldemar VI; 1475–1508	Succeeded by Waldemar VI
