= Albert VI of Anhalt-Köthen =

German prince

Albert VI, Prince of Anhalt-Köthen (died 9 January 1475) was a German prince of the House of Ascania and ruler of the principality of Anhalt-Köthen.

He was the youngest son of Albert IV, Prince of Anhalt-Köthen, but the eldest child of his second wife Elisabeth, daughter of Gebhard XI, Count of Querfurt.

== Life ==
Still a minor when his father died in 1423, Albert was bypassed as heir to Anhalt-Köthen by his older half-brothers, Adolph I and Waldemar V. After Waldemar's death in 1436, Adolph became the sole ruler of Anhalt-Köthen. Albert had to wait until the succession of the Köthen line was in jeopardy (almost 37 years) before he could assert his right of inheritance.

By 1471, Adolph's three sons had all acted on their intention to become priests; in consequence, they could not produce further heirs. The only two other living agnates of the family were Albert and his infant son. Adolph made a contract with his cousin George I, Prince of Anhalt-Dessau, by which his oldest son Waldemar VI was made Adolph's co-ruler ("Mitherr") in half of the principality. But under the terms of the contract, Adolph's half-brother Albert VI would inherit his part of Köthen upon Adolph's death and become the new co-ruler with Waldemar.

Adolph died in 1473 and Albert finally became one of the rulers of the principality with the title of "Lord of Köthen," but his reign lasted only fifteen months. On his death, he was succeeded by his only son Philip, who co-ruled with his cousins, the sons of Adolph I.

== Marriage and issue ==
In Alsleben on 27 March 1454 Albert married with Elisabeth (d. Querfurt, 18 September 1482), daughter of Günther II, Count of Mansfeld. They had seven children:

1. Anna (d. young).
2. Marie (d. aft. 1495), a nun at Gernrode, later Canoness.
3. Magdalena (d. Gandersheim, 2 October 1515), Abbess of Gandersheim (1511).
4. Margarete (d. young).
5. Philip, Prince of Anhalt-Köthen (b. 31 May 1468 - d. 13 November 1500).
6. Dorothea (d. 3 August 1505), married on 28 May 1496 to Joachim, Count of Oettingen-Oettingen-Spielberg-Wallerstein.
7. Scholastica (d. 1504), Abbess of Gernrode.

== Bibliography ==
- Anthony Stokvis: Manuel d'histoire, de généalogie et de chronologie de tous les États du globe, depuis les temps les plus reculés jusqu'à nos jours, preface H. F. Wijnman, Israel, 1966, chapter VIII «Généalogie de la Maison d'Anhalt, I» and genealogical table N° 126.

Preceded by Adolph I	Prince of Anhalt-Köthen with Waldemar VI; 1473–1475	Succeeded by Philip; Magnus; Adolph II; Waldemar VI
