= Philip, Prince of Anhalt-Köthen =

German prince

Philip, Prince of Anhalt-Köthen (31 May 1468 – 13 November 1500) was a German prince of the House of Ascania and ruler of the principality of Anhalt-Köthen.

He was the only son of Albert VI, Prince of Anhalt-Köthen, by his wife Elisabeth, daughter of Günther II, Count of Mansfeld.

== Life ==
In 1475, after the death of his father, the six-year-old Philip inherited the principality of Anhalt-Köthen as "Mitherr" (co-ruler) with his cousins Magnus, Adolph II, and Waldemar VI according to the terms of the succession contract signed in 1471 between Adolph I, Prince of Anhalt-Köthen and George I, Prince of Anhalt-Dessau.

Philip never married or had children, and his branch of the Anhalt-Köthen line became extinct with him.

Eight years after his death (in 1508), his cousins and successors Magnus and Adolph II renounced their rule in favor of Waldemar VI, who died shortly afterwards. Waldemar's only surviving son, Wolfgang, was the last ruler of the old principality of Anhalt-Köthen.

Preceded by Adolph I	Prince of Anhalt-Köthen with Magnus, Adolph II and Waldemar VI; 1475–1500	Succeeded by Magnus; Adolph II; Waldemar VI
