= Karl I of Anhalt-Zerbst =

Karl I

Prince of Anhalt-Zerbst
- Reign: 1551–1561
- Predecessor: John V
- Successor: Joachim Ernest and Bernhard VII

Prince of Anhalt-Plötzkau
- Reign: 1553–1561
- Predecessor: George III
- Successor: Joachim Ernest and Bernhard VII
- Born: 17 November 1534; Dessau
- Died: 4 May 1561 (aged 26); Zerbst
- Spouse: Anna of Pomerania
- House: House of Ascania
- Father: John V, Prince of Anhalt-Zerbst
- Mother: Margaret of Brandenburg

Karl I of Anhalt-Zerbst (17 November 1534 – 4 May 1561), was a German prince of the House of Ascania and ruler of the principality of Anhalt-Zerbst.

He was the eldest son of John V, Prince of Anhalt-Zerbst, by his wife Margaret, daughter of Joachim I Nestor, Elector of Brandenburg.

== Life ==
After the death of his father in 1551, Karl inherited Anhalt-Zerbst jointly with his younger brothers Joachim Ernest and Bernhard VII according to the family law of the House of Ascania, without any division of the territories of the principality.

In 1553 Karl and his brothers inherited Anhalt-Plötzkau after the death of their uncle George III.

In Zerbst on 16 May 1557 Karl married Anna (5 February 1531 – 13 October 1592), daughter of Barnim XI, Duke of Pomerania. The union was childless.

Karl died seven months before his last surviving uncle, Joachim I, Prince of Anhalt-Dessau. It was his brothers and their successors who inherited the territories of Joachim's principality.

Preceded by John V	Prince of Anhalt-Zerbst; 1551–1561; With: Joachim Ernest and Bernhard VII	Succeeded by Joachim Ernest and Bernhard VII
Preceded by George III	Prince of Anhalt-Plötzkau; 1553–1561; With: Joachim Ernest and Bernhard VII	Succeeded by Joachim Ernest and Bernhard VII
