= Albert V =

Albert V may refer to:

- Albert V, Duke of Saxe-Lauenburg (ca. mid-1330s–1370)
- Albert V, Duke of Mecklenburg (1397–1423)
- Albert II of Germany (1397–1439), Albert V as Duke of Austria
- Albert V, Prince of Anhalt-Dessau (died c. 1469)
- Albert V, Duke of Bavaria (1528–1579)
- Albert V, Duke of Saxe-Coburg (1648–1699)
