= Bernard VII =

Bernard VII may refer to:

- Bernhard VII, Prince of Anhalt-Zerbst (1540–1570)
- Bernard VII, Count of Armagnac (1360–1418)
- Bernard VII, Count of Comminges (1240s–1312)
- Bernard VII, Lord of Lippe (1428–1511)
