= Wolfgang, Prince of Anhalt-Köthen =

German prince (1492–1566)

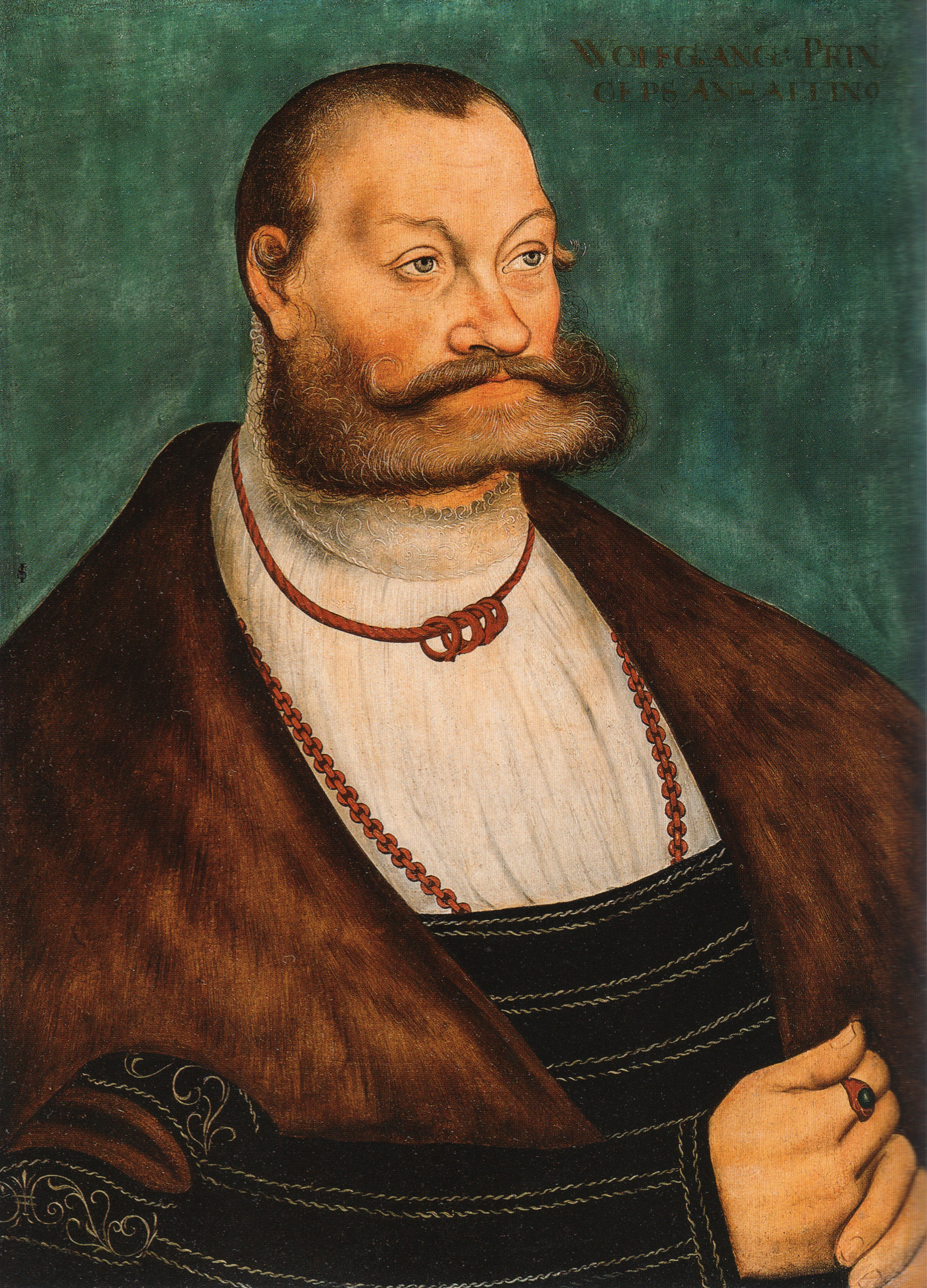
Wolfgang von Anhalt-Köthen (1492–1566)

Wolfgang, Prince of Anhalt-Köthen (1 August 1492, in Köthen – 23 March 1566, in Zerbst), was a German prince of the House of Ascania and ruler of the principality of Anhalt-Köthen. He was one of the earliest Protestant rulers in the Holy Roman Empire.

He was the second (but eldest surviving) son of Waldemar VI, Prince of Anhalt-Köthen, by his wife Margarete, daughter of Günther XX, Count of Schwarzburg and Lord of Arnstedt.

== Life ==
Wolfgang was born on 1 August 1492 in Köthen, Saxony-Anhalt. In 1500, at just eight years of age, Wolfgang was admitted to the University of Leipzig, and in 1508, at sixteen, his father died. Wolfgang then took over the government of the principality with residence in Köthen.

Wolfgang had the opportunity to meet Martin Luther at the Diet of Augsburg in 1521. He later said that "He gained my heart" after hearing him speak. With Luther's help, Wolfgang introduced the Reformation in Anhalt-Köthen (1525) and Anhalt-Bernburg (1526), which made them the second and third countries in the world (after the Electorate of Saxony) to adopt Protestantism officially.

In 1526 Wolfgang joined in a defensive alliance with other Evangelical states against the Emperor Charles V; this was a direct prelude to the later formation of the Schmalkaldic League. Wolfgang was also one of the six princes who, on 19 April 1529, as representatives of the Protestant minority in the Imperial Diet, drew up the Protestation at Speyer and petitioned the Diet to remove the Imperial Ban (German: Reichsacht) against Luther, as well as the proscription of his works and teachings, and called for the unhindered spread of Evangelical belief. In 1530 he signed the Augsburg Confession at the Diet of Augsburg. In 1534 Wolfgang ordered the first church inspections (German: Kirchenvisitationen) in Anhalt-Köthen, expropriated Catholic church possessions, and handed them over to the municipalities.

In 1544 he resigned his rights over Anhalt-Dessau in favor of his cousins, but retained his rights over Anhalt-Bernburg, where he had enlarged the existing castle in 1538 by the Wolfgang wing which made it the largest Renaissance castle in North Germany. When the old "Burg" of Köthen was destroyed by a fire in 1547, he made his permanent residence in Bernburg. That year, he participated in the Battle of Mühlberg and was outlawed for it by the Emperor. Wolfgang took refuge in Saxony and was appointed Governor of Magdeburg in 1551 by the Elector Maurice. In 1552 he was released from outlawry under the terms of the Peace of Passau and was restored to his territories.

In 1562, however, he signed all of his territories over to his cousins, keeping only Coswig. By 1564 he moved to Zerbst, where he died two years later on 23 March 1566, unmarried and childless.

Preceded by Waldemar VI	Prince of Anhalt-Köthen; 1508–1562	Succeeded by Joachim Ernest and Bernhard VII
