= Elisabeth of Anhalt-Zerbst (1545–1574) =

German abbess

Elizabeth of Anhalt
- Born: 15 October 1545; Dessau
- Died: 26 September 1574 (aged 28); Barby
- Burial: Barby
- Spouse: Wolfgang II of Barby and Mühlingen
- House: Ascania
- Father: John V, Prince of Anhalt-Zerbst
- Mother: Margaret of Brandenburg

Elisabeth of Anhalt (15 October 1545, Dessau – 26 September 1574, Barby) was a German abbess of the secular abbeys at Gernrode and Frose as Elisabeth III of Anhalt. After she left the convent, she became Countess of Barby by marriage.

== Life ==
Elisabeth was a daughter of the prince John V of Anhalt (1504–1551) from his marriage to Margaret (1511–1577), the daughter of Elector Joachim I of Brandenburg.

In 1565, Elisabeth was elected abbess of the imperial abbey of St. Cyriac in Gernrode. Her attempts to improve the financial situation of the heavily indebted met with little success. In 1570, she resigned from her post as abbess and married. She was succeeded as abbess by her niece Anna Maria of Anhalt.

She married on 19 July 1570 in Bernburg with Count Wolfgang II of Barby and Mühlingen (1531–1615). A dispute arose between Elisabeth and her brother Prince Joachim Ernest about the Abbey and her claim on Anlat. The dispute was resolved shortly before her death and she was compensated with a sum of 76000talers.

From her marriage with Wolfgang, Elisabeth had a son named Christopher. He died young. Elisabeth died of "consumption" in 1574 and was buried in Barby.
