= George II of Anhalt-Dessau =

German prince

George II, Prince of Anhalt-Dessau (1454 – 25 April 1509) was a German prince of the House of Ascania and ruler of the principality of Anhalt-Dessau. He was the fourth son of George I, Prince of Anhalt-Dessau, as second-born child of his fourth wife Anna, daughter of Albert VIII, Count of Lindow-Ruppin.

== Life ==
After the death of his father in 1474, George inherited Anhalt-Dessau alongside his older brothers Ernest I and Sigismund III and his younger brother Rudolph IV. Following the family law of the House of Ascania, this did not involve a division of the territories within the principality.

During life of his father, George was made "Mitherr" (co-ruler) of Köthen (1471) alongside his elder half-brother Waldemar VI, but soon resigned in Waldemar's favor. In 1480 he was made "Lord of Hoym and Wörlitz" and appointed "Pfandherr of Crossen, Cottbus and Peitz," a post he held until 1508.

In 1478 George married Agnes (ca. 1434 – Bernburg, 9 May 1512), daughter of Barnim VIII, Duke of Pomerania, and widow of Frederick of Altmark, son of Frederick I, Elector of Brandenburg. She was almost twenty years his senior and their union was childless, although some sources assert the existence of a child who was either stillborn or died shortly after the birth. On his death, George was succeeded by his surviving brothers and co-rulers Ernest I and Rudolph IV.

Preceded by George I	Prince of Anhalt-Dessau with Ernest I, Sigismund III (until 1487) and Rudolph IV; 1474–1509	Succeeded by Ernest I and Rudolph IV
