= Sigismund II of Anhalt-Dessau =

German prince

Sigismund II, Prince of Anhalt-Dessau (died aft. 22 May 1452) was a German prince of the House of Ascania and ruler of the principality of Anhalt-Dessau.

He was the fourth son of Sigismund I, Prince of Anhalt-Dessau, by his wife Judith, daughter of Gebhard XI, Count of Querfurt.

== Life ==
After the death of his father in 1405, Sigismund inherited the principality of Anhalt-Dessau with his older brothers Waldemar IV and George I and his younger brother Albert V as co-rulers. By virtue of the family of law of the House of Ascania, there was no division of territories among them.

Sigismund married Matilda (died 1443), daughter of Bernhard VI, Prince of Anhalt-Bernburg. Both spouses were direct descendants of Henry I, Count of Anhalt, through his sons Bernhard I (ancestor of Matilda), and Siegfried I (ancestor of Sigismund). The marriage was childless.

Without direct heirs at the time of his death, Sigismund was succeeded by his surviving brothers and co-rulers.

Preceded by Sigismund I	Prince of Anhalt-Dessau with Waldemar IV (until 1417), George I and Albert V 1405–1417	Succeeded by George I and Albert V
