= Adolph I of Anhalt-Köthen =

German royal

Adolph I, Prince of Anhalt-Köthen (died Zerbst, 28 August 1473), was a German prince of the House of Ascania and ruler of the principality of Anhalt-Köthen.

He was the eldest son of Albert IV, Prince of Anhalt-Köthen, by his first wife Elisabeth, daughter of Gebhard III, Count of Mansfeld.

== Life ==
After the death of his father in 1423, Adolph succeeded him in Anhalt-Köthen with his second brother Waldemar V as co-ruler; their younger half-brother Albert VI, still a minor, was bypassed. After the death of Waldemar in 1436, Adolph became the sole ruler of the principality as "Lord of Köthen."

All three of Adolph's surviving sons entered the priesthood; after them, the only remaining heirs to the principality were Adolph's half-brother Albert VI and Albert's son Philip. Since it appeared as though Adolph's family line would die out in the next generation, he drew up a succession contract with his cousin George I, Prince of Anhalt-Dessau, in 1471. Under the terms of this contract, George I would inherit half of Anhalt-Köthen as "Mitherr" (co-ruler) and the other half would be given to the long-excluded Albert VI. Shortly after, George renounced his rights in favor of his eldest son Waldemar, who became co-ruler with Adolph as Waldemar VI until Adolph's death in 1473.

Thirty-five years later, in 1508, the only two surviving males of the family, Magnus and Adolph, formally renounced their rights over the principality with the result that the Anhalt-Köthen line became extinct.

== Marriage and issue ==
In Ruppin on 2 November 1442 Adolph married Cordula (died 1 June 1508), daughter of Albert III, Count of Lindau-Ruppin. They had seven children:

1. Anna (died 1 August 1485), Abbess in Derenburg.
2. Magdalena (died aft. 1481), a nun at Quedlinburg (1481).
3. Bernhard (died young).
4. Melchior (died young).
5. Magnus, Prince of Anhalt-Köthen (1455 – October 1524).
6. William (born 1457 – d. Marburg, 29 August 1504), a Franciscan friar. He renounced all his rights of inheritance to the principality during his father's lifetime.
7. Adolph II, Prince of Anhalt-Köthen (16 October 1458 – Merseburg, 24 March 1526).

Preceded by Albert IV	Prince of Anhalt-Köthen with Waldemar V until 1436 with Waldemar VI since 1471; 1423–1473	Succeeded by Albert VI and Waldemar VI
