= Waldemar IV of Anhalt-Dessau =

German prince

Waldemar IV, Prince of Anhalt-Dessau (died aft. 22 July 1417) was a German prince of the House of Ascania and ruler of the principality of Anhalt-Dessau.

He was the eldest son of Sigismund I, Prince of Anhalt-Dessau, by his wife Judith, daughter of Gebhard XI, Count of Querfurt.

== Life ==
After the death of his father in 1405, Waldemar inherited his principality of Anhalt-Dessau, but had to ruled jointly with his younger brothers George I, Sigismund II, and Albert V by virtue of the family law of the House of Ascania, which stipulated no division of the territories of the principality.

Unmarried and childless at his death, Waldemar was succeeded by his brothers and co-rulers.

Preceded by Sigismund I	Prince of Anhalt-Dessau with George I, Sigismund II and Albert V 1405–1417	Succeeded by George I Sigismund II; Albert V
