= Margaret of Brandenburg, Duchess of Pomerania =

Margaret of Brandenburg
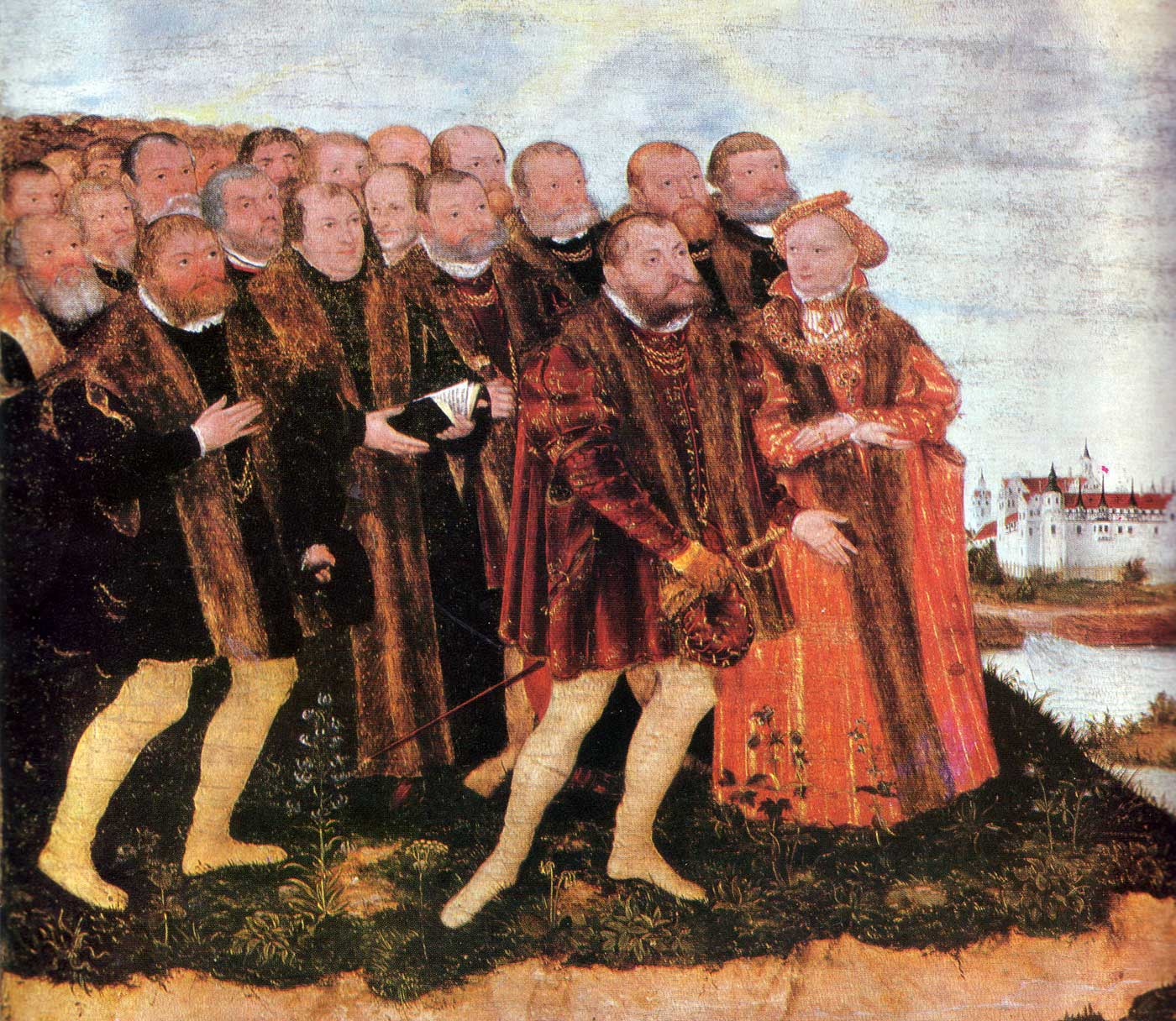
- The Baptism of Christ (detail), 1556, by Lucas Cranach the Younger. The two people at the front are said to represent Margrave John of Küstrin and his sister Margareta. In the background, the Royal Palace at Dessau is depicted. The scene refers to Margaret's second marriage in 1534 in Dessau.
- Born: c. 1511
- Died: after 3 November 1577
- Spouse: George I, Duke of Pomerania (m. 1530; died 1531) John V, Prince of Anhalt-Zerbst (m. 1534; died 1551)
- Issue Detail: Georgia, Countess of Labischin; Charles I, Prince of Anhalt-Zerbst; Joachim Ernest, Prince of Anhalt; Marie, Countess of Barby and Mühlingen; Bernhard VII, Prince of Anhalt-Zerbst; Margaret of Anhalt-Zerbst; Elisabeth, Countess of Barby
- House: Hohenzollern
- Father: Joachim I, Elector of Brandenburg
- Mother: Elizabeth of Denmark

Margaret of Brandenburg (1511 – after 3 November 1577) was a Princess of Brandenburg by birth and by marrying first a duke of Pomerania and later a prince of Anhalt.

== Life ==
Margaret was the youngest daughter of the Elector Joachim I of Brandenburg (1484–1535) from his marriage to Elisabeth (1485–1555), daughter of King John of Denmark.

=== Duchess of Pomerania ===
She married her first husband on 23 January 1530 in Berlin Duke George I of Pomerania (1493–1531). She brought a dowry of 20000guilders into the marriage, enabling George I to transfer a jointure consisting of the districts of Barth, Damgarten, Tribsees, Grimsby and Klempenow to her. The marriage had apparently been agreed during negotiations at Grimnitz Castle about the constitutional relationship between Brandenburg and Pomerania. George I died a year after the marriage and Margaret enjoyed the revenue from het wittum for only three years. She was quite unpopular in Pomerania and when Prince John IV of Anhalt asked for her hand, her stepson Philip I, Duke of Pomerania had to levy a special tax to pay her dowry and redeem her jointure.

Margaret and George had a posthumous child, a girl named Georgia. Georgia went with her mother to Anhalt, but returned to Pomerania when she was eight years old. Margaret succeeded in tough negotiations with her stepson, Philip I, to delay her return until May 1543.

=== Princess of Anhalt ===
Her second husband was on 15 February 1534 in Dessau prince John V of Anhalt-Zerbst (1504–1551). Her marriage to John soon proved unhappy. Margaret fled from her husband to her wittum, Roßlau Castle. Martin Luther tried to mediate between John and Margaret. He visited her at Roßlau Castle and blamed her for leaving her husband cheekily. This started a fierce war of words. Luther later reported: I must have told her clearly enough, until I was attracting her wrath.

John eventually accused Margaret of marital infidelity and imprisoned her in 1550. John's personal physician was tortured to make him confess a relationship with the princess, but he did not budge. She managed to escape from her prison and after a number of adventures arrived half-naked and robbed at the court of her cousin King Christian III of Denmark in Copenhagen.

Later, she lived for a while with her sister Elisabeth, who advised her to protect herself by marrying for a third time. Elisabeth held her sister to be unreliable and unstable and warned her son-in-law Albert not to take in Margaret. Albert took her in anyway, and after his death George Frederick I, the administrator of Prussia, took care of her, because her own children refused to support her.

By the end of her life, she led an unsettled existence in the Pomeranian-Polish border region and is said to have married a simple farmer. It is also alleged that she contacted her daughter Georgia during her pregnancy and even visited her in Schlochau under a false identity.

== Marriages and issue ==
From her first marriage to George I, she had a daughter:

- Georgia (1531–1573)

married in 1563 Count Stanislaus Latalski of Labischin († 1598)

From her second marriage to John V, she had the following children:

- Charles I (1534–1561), Prince of Anhalt-Zerbst

married in 1557 princess Anna of Pomerania (1531-1592)

- Joachim Ernest (1536–1586), Prince of Anhalt

married firstly in 1560 Countess Agnes of Barby (1540-1569)
married secondly in 1571 Princess Eleanor of Württemberg (1552-1618)

- Marie (1538–1563)

married in 1559 Count Albert X of Barby and Mühlingen (1534-1586), had Maria of Barby-Mühlingen (1563-1619), who married George III

- Bernhard VII (1540–1570)

married in 1565 princess Clare of Brunswick-Lüneburg (1550-1598)

- Margaret (1541–1547)
- Elisabeth (1545–1574)

married in 1570 Count Wolfgang II of Barby (1531-1615)

== References and sources ==
- Johannes Voigt: Die Fürstin Margarethe von Anhalt, geborne Markgräfin von Brandenburg. Aus archivalischen Quellen, in: Schmidt´s Zeitschrift für Geschichtswissenschaft, vol. IV, 1845, p. 327-359.
- Dirk Schleinert: Die 2. Hochzeit Herzog Georgs I. von Pommern mit Margarete von Brandenburg im Januar 1530 in Berlin. Kommentierte Edition einer zeitgenössischen Beschreibung, in: Baltische Studien, NF 94, 2008, pp. 55–70.
- Dirk Schleinert: Georgia von Pommern (1531-1573). Studien zum Leben einer Fürstin des 16. Jahrhunderts, In: Jahrbuch für die Geschichte Mittel- und Ostdeutschlands, vol. 55, 2009, pp. 71–120.
