= Sigismund III of Anhalt-Dessau =

German prince

Sigismund III, Prince of Anhalt-Dessau (1456 – Dessau, 27 November 1487), was a German prince of the House of Ascania and ruler of the principality of Anhalt-Dessau.

He was the fourth son of George I, Prince of Anhalt-Dessau, as third-born child of his fourth wife Anna, daughter of Albert VIII, Count of Lindau-Ruppin.

== Life ==
In 1474 Sigismund succeeded his father in the principality of Anhalt-Dessau, but, by virtue of the family law of the House of Ascania, he had to rule jointly with his older brother Ernest I and his younger brothers George II and Rudolph IV.

Sigismund never married or had children; on his death, he was succeeded by his brothers and co-rulers.

Preceded by George I	Prince of Anhalt-Dessau with Ernest I, George II and Rudolph IV; 1474–1487	Succeeded by Ernest I George II; Rudolph IV
