= Bernhard VII of Anhalt-Zerbst =

Bernard VII

Prince of Anhalt-Zerbst
- Reign: 1551–1570
- Predecessor: John V
- Successor: Joachim Ernest

Prince of Anhalt-Plötzkau
- Reign: 1553–1570
- Predecessor: George III
- Successor: Joachim Ernest

Prince of Anhalt-Dessau
- Reign: 1561–1570
- Predecessor: Joachim I
- Successor: Joachim Ernest

Prince of Anhalt-Köthen
- Reign: 1562–1570
- Predecessor: Wolfgang
- Successor: Joachim Ernest
- Born: 17 March 1540; Dessau, Germany
- Died: 1 March 1570 (aged 29); Dessau, Germany
- Spouse: Clara of Gifhorn (m. 1565)
- Issue: Franz George
- House: House of Ascania
- Father: John V, Prince of Anhalt-Zerbst
- Mother: Margaret of Brandenburg

Bernhard VII of Anhalt-Zerbst (17 March 1540 – 1 March 1570), was a German prince of the House of Ascania and ruler of the principality of Anhalt-Zerbst.

He was born and died in Dessau, and was the third and youngest son of John V, Prince of Anhalt-Zerbst by his wife Margaret, daughter of Joachim I Nestor, Elector of Brandenburg.

== Life ==
Bernhard inherited Anhalt-Zerbst when his father died in 1551 along with his older brothers Karl I and Joachim Ernest according to the stipulations of the family law of the House of Ascania, which mandated no division of the territories of the principality.

Upon the deaths without issue of his uncles George III of Anhalt-Plötzkau in 1553 and Joachim I of Anhalt-Dessau in 1561, Bernhard and Joachim Ernest inherited their lands, which were merged into Anhalt-Zerbst (Karl only inherited Plötzkau, because he died before Joachim I). In 1562 Anhalt-Köthen was also merged into Anhalt-Zerbst after the death without issue of its last prince, Wolfgang. Bernhard made his residence in Dessau.

== Marriage and issue ==
In Dessau on 28 May 1565 Bernhard married Clara (b. Gifhorn, 1 January 1550 – d. Franzburg, 26 January 1598), posthumous daughter of Francis, Duke of Gifhorn. They had only one son:

1. Franz George (b. 17 October 1567 – d. Zerbst, 7 September 1568).

Bernhard died without surviving male heirs and was succeeded by his brother Joachim Ernest, who became sole ruler of all the Anhalt territories.

| Preceded by John V | Prince of Anhalt-Zerbst with Karl I (until 1561) and Joachim Ernest; 1551–1570 | Succeeded by Joachim Ernest |
| Preceded by George III | Prince of Anhalt-Plötzkau with Karl I (until 1561) and Joachim Ernest; 1553–1570 | Succeeded by Joachim Ernest |
| Preceded by Joachim I | Prince of Anhalt-Dessau with Joachim Ernest; 1561–1570 | Succeeded by Joachim Ernest |
| Preceded by Wolfgang | Prince of Anhalt-Köthen with Joachim Ernest; 1562–1570 | Succeeded by Joachim Ernest |
