= Rudolph IV of Anhalt-Dessau =

German prince

Rudolph IV, Prince of Anhalt-Dessau, "the Brave" (around 1466 – Verona, 7 September 1510), was a German prince of the House of Ascania, ruler of the principality of Anhalt-Dessau and an army commander.

== Biography ==
He was the fifth son of George I, Prince of Anhalt-Dessau, as the fourth-born child of his fourth wife Anna, daughter of Albert VIII, Count of Lindau-Ruppin.

The last of his father's sons to survive adulthood, Rudolph succeeded him in 1474 as co-ruler of the principality of Anhalt-Dessau with his older brothers Ernest I, George II, and Sigismund III.

After receiving an education befitting his rank, Rudolph entered the court of Maximilian I of Austria around 1485 which enhanced the prestige of the Principality of Anhalt. In 1486, he was present at Maximilian's coronation in Aachen and was knighted. He subsequently fought alongside Maximilian as a mercenary leader against the Flemish Revolt and was taken prisoner with him in Bruges in 1488. Rudolph was among the hostages who had to remain in Flemish captivity as collateral for the release of Maximilian, but was released from captivity upon the arrival of a German army under Emperor Frederick III.

His loyalty was rewarded, and Rudolph became one of Maximilian's advisors and closest friends. He rendered even greater service to the King in the reconquest of the Austrian hereditary lands, which King Matthias Corvinus of Hungary had largely seized in the Austrian–Hungarian War (1477–1488). After the death of Matthias Corvinus on 9 April 1490, the city Vienna was recaptured without resistance, but the castle there had to be stormed on 19 August 1490. On this occasion Rudolph of Anhalt distinguished himself in battle. Two days later, Klosterneuburg also fell into Rudolph's hands. After more than twelve years of occupation, the old border defense against the Hungarians was restored for the Empire and the House of Austria.

In the Italian War of 1494–1495, he sent German mercenaries to Italy to support Naples against King Charles VIII of France and negotiated with the Pope on behalf of King Maximilian I. From 1496 to 1498, he accompanied Maximilian on his campaigns against France in Italy. From 1501 to 1503, he carried out the King's diplomatic and military missions in the eastern hereditary lands and in southern Italy. During the War of the Succession of Landshut (1504), he participated in the capture of Kufstein Fortress and was subsequently deployed in the campaign against Vladislaus II of Hungary (1506).

After the death of King Philip the Handsome, Maximilian sent Rudolph as his field marshal to the Netherlands to support the regentess Margaret of Austria and bring about a decisive victory in the war against Charles II, Duke of Guelders. He recruited more than 2,000 mercenaries, but apart from the capture of Poederoijen Castle on the Meuse River (June 1508), he achieved no major victories. Margaret was increasingly interested in a settlement with France and demanded that Rudolph disbanded the army. Maximilian's temporary plans to replace his daughter with Rudolph as governor-general were abandoned, as Rudolph was extremely unpopular in the Netherlands due to the mercenaries' plundering.

After the peace treaty with France (League of Cambrai, 1508), he joined Emperor Maximilian in the War against Venice (1509). A number of northern Italian cities were captured, but not held permanently. Upon Maximilian's return to the Empire after the failed Siege of Padua, Rudolph was appointed Supreme Field Captain, but even in 1510, decisive victories for the Imperial forces eluded them in the war, which was waged with great cruelty. He was defeated in the Battle of the citadel of Vicenza, and after persistent difficulties with pay, mutinies, and disagreements with his allies, Rudolph, under pressure from the Venetians, was forced to retreat to Verona in late summer, where he died in an epidemic.

Rudolph never married or had any children. Upon his death, Rudolph was succeeded by his only surviving brother, Ernest I.

| Preceded by George I | Prince of Anhalt-Dessau with Ernest I, George II (until 1509) and Sigismund III (until 1487); 1474–1510 | Succeeded by Ernest I |
