= George III of Anhalt-Dessau =

George III
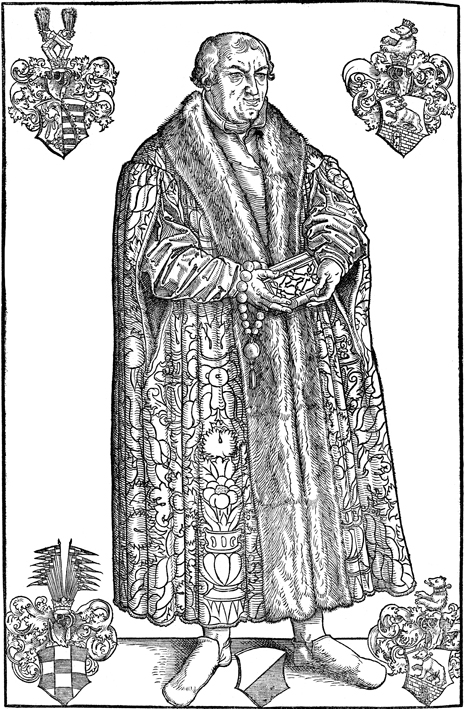

Prince of Anhalt-Dessau
- Reign: 1516–1544
- Predecessor: Ernest I
- Successor: defunct

Prince of Anhalt-Plötzkau
- Reign: 1544–1553
- Predecessor: Principality created
- Successor: Karl I Joachim Ernest Bernhard VII
- Born: 15 August 1507; Dessau
- Died: 17 October 1553 (aged 46); Dessau
- House: House of Ascania
- Father: Ernest I, Prince of Anhalt-Dessau
- Mother: Margaret of Münsterberg

George III, Prince of Anhalt-Dessau (15 August 1507 – 17 October 1553), was a German prince of the House of Ascania and ruler of the principality of Anhalt-Dessau, and also a Protestant Reformer. After 1544 he became the first ruler of the principality of Anhalt-Plötzkau.

George was the third (but second surviving) son of Ernest I, Prince of Anhalt-Dessau, by his wife Margaret of Münsterberg, daughter of Henry I, Duke of Münsterberg-Oels and granddaughter of George of Poděbrady, King of Bohemia.

== Life ==
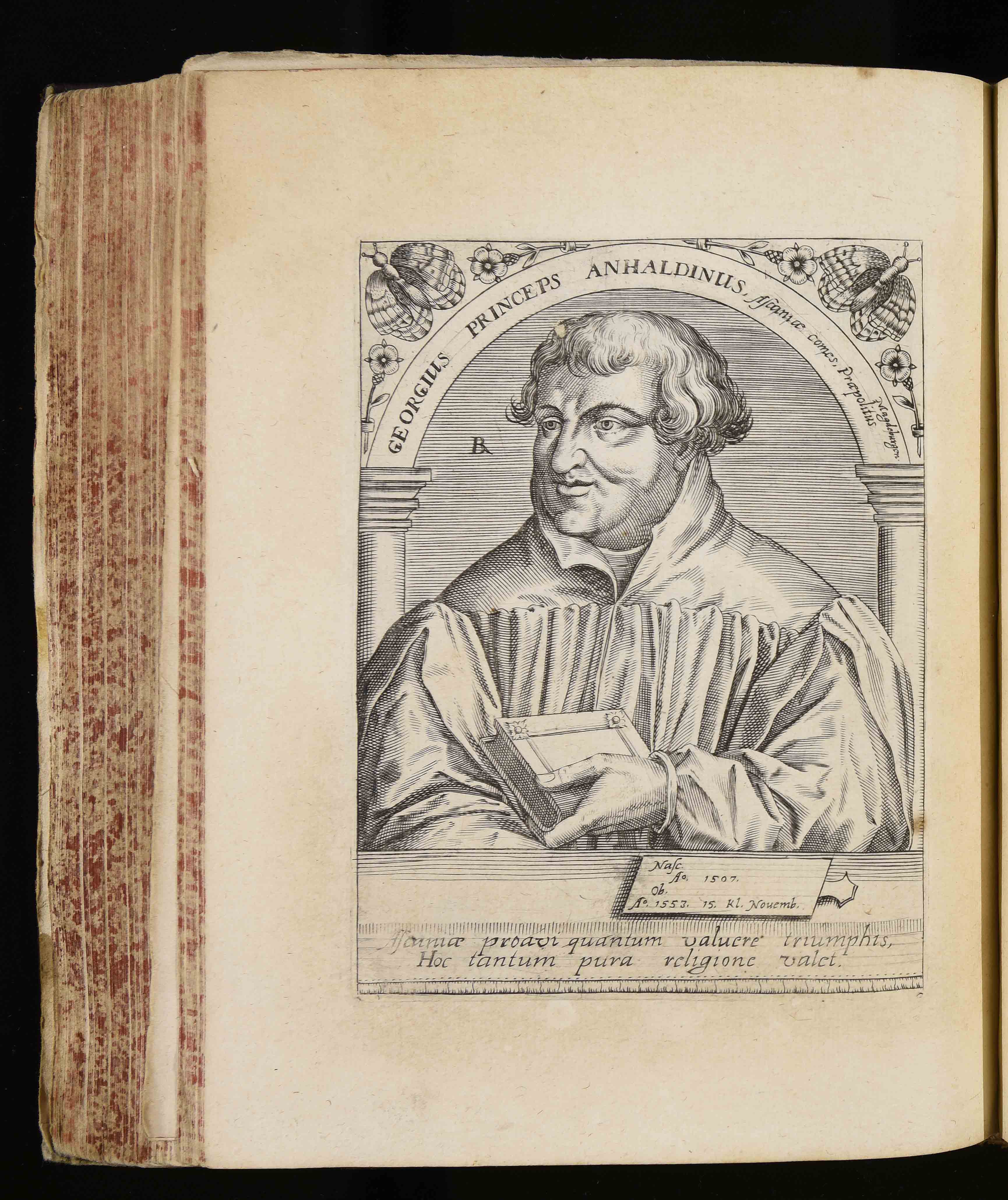

He was mainly brought up with his brothers John V and Joachim I by his devout mother. After the death of his father in 1516, he inherited Anhalt-Dessau as a co-ruler with his brothers (at first with their mother serving as regent).

With the assistance of his kinsman Adolph, the Bishop of Merseburg, George was elevated to the rank of Canon in that see in 1518, and attended the University of Leipzig, where the theologian Georg Helt of Forchheim became his "highly beloved teacher."

In 1524 Adolph consecrated George as a priest. That he might be better able to refute Lutheran beliefs, he made a thorough study of the Bible, the Church Fathers, and church history. The extreme emotional tensions and qualms of conscience into which his investigations brought him induced a violent illness that left its mark on him for the rest of his life. It was only after his mother's death (28 June 1530) that he made peace with his religious convictions; from the time of the Diet of Augsburg in 1530 both George and his brothers allied themselves with the Lutherans.

After the first Evangelical celebration of the Mass at Dessau, on Maundy Thursday in 1534, George visited the district churches, making the fewest possible changes in the church practises in accordance with his natural disposition and with Luther's acquiescence. In the interest of peace, he sought to deter Luther, in 1538, from publishing his tract "Against the Bishop of Magdeburg" (Wider den Bischof zu Magdeburg) and persuaded him in 1542 not to circulate his sharply worded tract on the feud of Wurzen.

In 1544 the protector of Merseburg Cathedral, Maurice of Saxony, appointed his brother Augustus as administrator, but because the latter was not a cleric, Maurice designated George as his "coadjutor in spiritual affairs." That year, he and his brothers decided to divide their principality of Anhalt-Dessau formally; George received Plötzkau.

In his new capacity as coadjutor, George forthwith proceeded, in company with Antonius Musa, just then appointed cathedral preacher at Merseburg, to visit all of the cathedral parishes, exhibiting great patience, tactful discretion, and forbearance. He next conferred with Maurice in the matter of a prospective liturgy, which, in accordance with his suggestions and by virtue of the deliberations of the consistories of Merseburg and Meissen, was officially completed at Altenzelle in 1545. From then on George convened the cathedral clergy twice a year to a synod in Merseburg Cathedral, and on such occasions discoursed upon the questions and evils of the time (and also upon proper official conduct). He based these conciones synodicae on outlines furnished to him by Melanchthon. Of the many sermons which he delivered in the cathedral, only a few have been preserved. They are distinguished by temperate and lucid exposition.

When the Schmalkald War broke out in spite of his efforts to prevent it, George received under his roof the fugitive Camerarius and his family. He also interceded for Jonas, who had incurred the anger of Maurice of Saxony, and sought to restrain the clergy from "suspicious and frivolous words that might serve to cause discord." Although he "hated" the Augsburg Interim, he felt that he ought to lend a hand in the preparation of the Leipzig Interim, in order to preclude still worse results. In 1549 the emperor's candidate Michael Helding (Sidonius) was postulated by the chapter as Bishop of Merseburg. Until his arrival, George was to continue administering the diocese. To strengthen the Lutheran confession as firmly as possible before the threatening storm, he now delivered his powerful sermons "On the False Prophets," and "On the Right Worthy Sacrament of the Body and Blood of Christ," which were directed both against Rome and Protestant religious fanatics. Afterward he retired to his estates in Anhalt. Traveling often to Warmsdorf, he continued to preach there, and when the occasion presented itself, he sought to mediate the Osiandrian dispute.

He died unmarried after lingering sickness, and Melanchthon composed his epitaph. His unfeigned piety, gentleness, and love of peace, his benevolence and freedom of service, all earned him the honorable epithet "devout" or "pious." His theology was that of Luther.

His personal library has been preserved intact, and is now part of the Anhaltische Landesbücherei at Dessau, along with an exhibition to honor his 500th birthday.

Preceded by Ernest I	Prince of Anhalt-Dessau with John V and Joachim I 1516–1544	Succeeded by Principality divided in Anhalt-Zerbst, Anhalt-Plötzkau and Anhalt-Dessau
Preceded by Principality created	Prince of Anhalt-Plötzkau; 1544–1553	Succeeded by Karl I Joachim Ernest; Bernhard VII
