= John V of Anhalt-Zerbst =

German prince

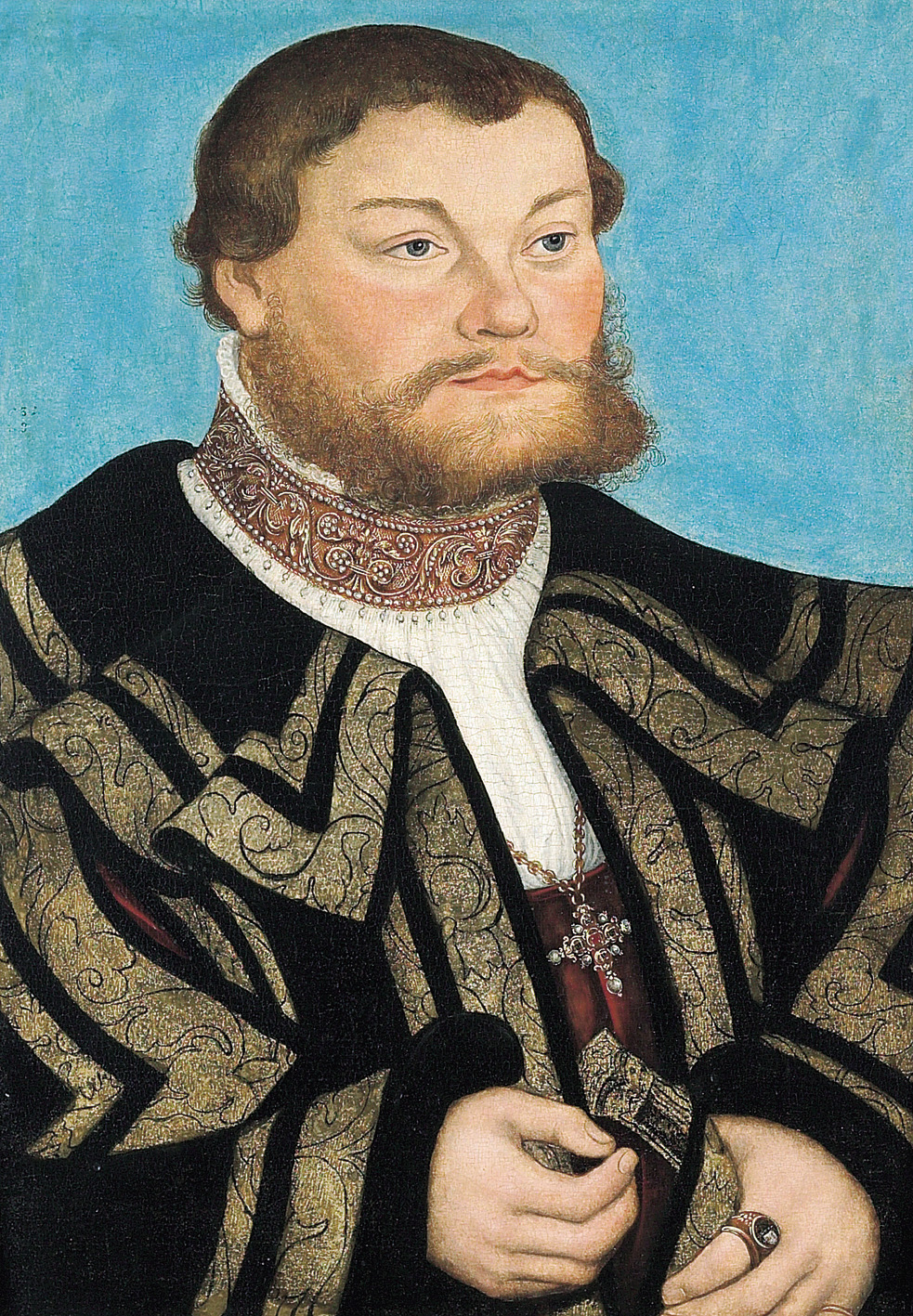
- Portrait by Lucas Cranach the Elder c. 1532
- Born: 4 September 1504; Dessau
- Died: 4 February 1551 (aged 46); Zerbst
- Noble family: Ascania
- Spouse: Margarete of Brandenburg
- Father: Ernest I, Prince of Anhalt-Dessau
- Mother: Margarete of Münsterberg-Oels

John V of Anhalt-Zerbst (Dessau, 4 September 1504 – Zerbst, 4 February 1551), was a German prince of the House of Ascania and ruler of the principality of Anhalt-Dessau. From 1544, he assumed rule of the re-created principality of Anhalt-Zerbst.

John was the second (but eldest surviving) son of Ernest I, Prince of Anhalt-Dessau, by his wife Margarete, daughter of Henry I, Duke of Münsterberg-Oels, and granddaughter of George of Poděbrady, King of Bohemia.

== Life ==
Upon the death of his father in 1516, John and his brothers George III and Joachim I inherited Anhalt-Dessau as co-rulers according to the family law of the House of Ascania. During their first years of rule, their mother Margarete served as regent.

The brothers shared the government of the principality for almost twenty-eight years, until 1544, when they decided to divide up their territories. John received Zerbst, thereby reviving the old principality of Anhalt-Zerbst that became extinct in 1396 with the creation of Anhalt-Dessau and Anhalt-Köthen.

== Marriage and issue ==
In Dessau on 15 February 1534, John married Margarete (b. 29 September 1511 – d. aft. 3 December 1577), daughter of Joachim I Nestor, Elector of Brandenburg, and widow of George I, Duke of Pomerania. Margarete's stepson, the new Duke of Pomerania, Philip I, had to pay her a lifetime annuity of 1200 guilders from his personal treasure in order to cover the cost of her dowry.

From her marriage to George I, Margarete had a posthumous daughter, Georgia, who followed her mother to Anhalt; however, was decided that when she reached her eighth birthday (in 1539) she must be returned to Pomerania under the custody of her half-brother Philip I. Despite this, Margaret was able to have kept her daughter with her until May 1543, when she was finally sent to her homeland.

The union with the widowed daughter of the Elector of Brandenburg was a high honor for John, and he decided to celebrate the wedding with great pomp. But by that time, he was in poor health; finally, in 1544, he suffered a stroke. His relations with Margarete worsened during the following years; in 1550 John ordered the temporary arrest of his wife, but she fled.

John and Margarete had six children:

1. Karl I, Prince of Anhalt-Zerbst (b. Dessau, 17 November 1534 – d. Zerbst, 4 May 1561).
2. Joachim Ernest, Prince of Anhalt (b. Dessau, 21 October 1536 – d. Dessau, 6 December 1586).
3. Marie (b. Dessau, 1 December 1538 – d. Rosslau, 25 April 1563), married on 25 August 1559 to Albert X, Count of Barby-Mühlingen.
4. Bernhard VII, Prince of Anhalt-Zerbst (b. Dessau, 17 March 1540 – d. Dessau, 1 March 1570).
5. Margarete (b. Dessau, 18 August 1541 – d. Zerbst, 25 July 1547).
6. Elisabeth (b. Dessau, 15 October 1545 – d. Barby, 26 September 1574), married on 19 July 1570 to Wolfgang II, Count of Barby-Mühlingen.

John V of Anhalt-Zerbst House of Ascania Born: 4 September 1504 Died: 4 February 1551
Preceded by Ernest I	Prince of Anhalt-Dessau with George III and Joachim I 1516–1544	Succeeded by Principality divided into Anhalt-Zerbst, Anhalt-Plötzkau and Anhalt-Dessau
Preceded by Principality (re-)created	Prince of Anhalt-Zerbst; 1544–1551	Succeeded by Karl I Joachim Ernest; Bernhard VII
