= Adolph II of Anhalt-Köthen =

German royal, bishop (1458–1526)

Adolph II, Prince of Anhalt-Köthen, also Anhalt-Zerbst (16 October 1458 – 24 March 1526) was a German prince of the House of Ascania and ruler of the principality of Anhalt-Köthen. A Roman Catholic Bishop of Merseburg, he remained until his death a staunch opponent of Martin Luther.

== Life ==
Adolph was the fifth and youngest son of Adolph I, Prince of Anhalt-Köthen, by his wife Cordula, daughter of Albert III, Count of Lindau-Ruppin.

In 1471 he began his studies at the University of Leipzig and in 1475 was elected Rector. Because he and his brothers had decided to become priests, their father Adolph I drew up a succession contract with the Anhalt-Dessau branch of the House of Ascania, headed by George I, Prince of Anhalt-Dessau, to secure the existence of the principality. The contract stipulated that Adolph I would rule jointly with George's son Waldemar VI, and that Adolph I's half-brother Albert VI was to become co-ruler with Waldemar after Adolph's death. Upon the death of Albert VI, Adolph II and his brother Magnus succeeded their uncle as co-rulers of Anhalt-Köthen with their cousins Philip and Waldemar VI. Adolph used the title "Lord of Zerbst" to identify the portion of the principality in which he resided. Despite his spiritual office, Adolph participated in the government of his principality for several years; only in 1508 did he formally renounce his rights along with his brother Magnus.

In 1488 Adolph II became Provost of Magdeburg Cathedral, then was ordained as a priest two years later (in 1490). In 1507 was accepted by Bishop Thilo of Merseburg as his Coadjutor and succeeded him in 1514 as Bishop of Merseburg.

His administration over the Bishopric of Merseburg was prudent and kind. Besides his administrative duties, he also preached and taught. Although he fundamentally accepted the justification by faith doctrine proclaimed by Luther, he rejected all intervention in the existing Church order. In 1520 he ordered the burning of Luther's books and forbade the reading of the reformed Bible translation in 1522. In 1523 Adolph petitioned Duke George of Saxony for the expulsion of the Lutheran minister Sebastian Fröschel from Leipzig.

In May 1525 he was in Leipzig, where he consecrated the Nikolaikirche, when Protestant disturbances broke out in Merseburg, reinforcing his opposition to the Reformation. He died in March the following year while en route to Leipzig to encourage his nephew, Prince George, to still more rigorous anti-Protestant measures. He is buried in Merseburg Cathedral.

Adolph II, Prince of Anhalt-Köthen House of Ascania Born: 16 October 1458 in Köthen Died: 24 March 1526 in Merseburg
Regnal titles
Preceded by Albert VI	Princes of Anhalt-Köthen; 1475–1508; With: Philip (till 1500), Magnus and Waldemar VI	Succeeded by Waldemar VI
Catholic Church titles
Regnal titles
Preceded by Thilo of Trotha	Prince-Bishop of Merseburg; 1514–1526	Succeeded by Vincenz of Schleinitz-Eulau
