= Waldemar V of Anhalt-Köthen =

German prince

Waldemar V, Prince of Anhalt-Köthen (died 1436) was a German prince of the House of Ascania and ruler of the principality of Anhalt-Köthen.

He was the second son of Albert IV, Prince of Anhalt-Köthen, by his first wife Elisabeth, daughter of Gebhard III, Count of Mansfeld.

== Life ==
Under the terms of the family law of the House of Ascania, Waldemar inherited Anhalt-Köthen jointly with his older brother Adolph I after the death of their father in 1423, without a division of territories. The brothers served as co-rulers until Waldemar's death; because Waldemar's only son was ordained a priest, Adolph became the sole ruler of the principality.

== Marriage and issue ==
In 1420 Waldemar married Sophie, daughter of Conrad of Hadmersleben, Lord of Egeln, by his wife Elisabeth of Querfurt, who had the previous year become the second wife of Waldemar's father Albert IV; in consequence, the spouses were step-siblings. They had two children:

1. John III (d. 1463), canon at Magdeburg and Halberstadt, who renounced all his rights after the death of his father.
2. Elisabeth (d. aft. 1490), a nun at Derenburg.

Waldemar's widow Sophie went on to marry Albert V, Prince of Anhalt-Dessau, a relative of her first husband.

Waldemar V of Anhalt-Köthen House of Ascania Died: 1436
Preceded by Albert IV	Prince of Anhalt-Köthen; 1423–1436 with Adolph I (1423–1473)	Succeeded by Adolph I
