= Albert V of Anhalt-Dessau =

German prince

Albert V, Prince of Anhalt-Dessau (died ca. 1469) was a German prince of the House of Ascania and ruler of the principality of Anhalt-Dessau.

He was the fifth son of Sigismund I, Prince of Anhalt-Dessau, by his wife Judith, daughter of Gebhard XI, Count of Querfurt.

== Life ==
After the death of his father in 1405, Albert inherited the principality of Anhalt-Dessau as co-ruler with his older brothers Waldemar IV, George I, and Sigismund II. Following the family law of the House of Ascania, no division of territory accompanied the accession of the brothers as co-rulers.

Albert married Sophie, daughter of Conrad of Hadmersleben, Lord of Egeln, and widow of Waldemar V, Prince of Anhalt-Köthen. They had two daughters:

1. Magdalena (died aft. 1481), a nun in Gandersheim (1481).
2. Margarete (died ca. 1466).

Albert died without male heirs and was succeeded as ruler of the principality by his only surviving brother, George I.

Preceded by Sigismund I	Prince of Anhalt-Dessau with Waldemar IV (until 1417), George I and Sigismund II (until 1452); 1405–1469	Succeeded by George I
