= Albert IV of Anhalt-Köthen =

German prince

Albert IV, Prince of Anhalt-Köthen (d. Coswig, 24 November 1423), was a German prince of the House of Ascania and ruler of the principality of Anhalt-Zerbst until 1396, when he became the first ruler of the principality of Anhalt-Köthen.

He was the second son of John II, Prince of Anhalt-Zerbst, by his wife Elisabeth, daughter of John I, Count of Henneberg-Schleusingen.

== Life ==
In 1382, after the death of his father, Albert inherited the principality of Anhalt-Zerbst jointly with his brothers Sigismund I and Waldemar III. After the death of Waldemar in 1391, Albert and Sigismund became sole co-rulers. Destined for the church at a very young age, Albert was made canon of Magdeburg Cathedral in 1392.

Five years later, in 1396, the brothers Sigismund and Albert decided to settle on a formal division of the principality of Anhalt-Zerbst. As "Lord of Köthen," Albert took possession of the town of Köthen as his main residence and capital of his newly created principality. Shortly after, he resigned all of his ecclesiastic posts in order to marry and produce heirs to his lands.

== Marriages and Issue ==
Bef. 1398 Albert married Elisabeth (d. aft. 6 June 1403), daughter of Gebhard III, Count of Mansfeld. They had six children:

1. Adolph I, Prince of Anhalt-Köthen (d. Zerbst, 28 August 1473).
2. Anna (d. bef. 13 June 1426), married in 1422 to William, Prince of Wenden and Lord of Werle.
3. Lutrud (d. 4 June 1465), married on 14 October 1430 to John III, Duke of Mecklenburg-Stargard.
4. William (d. young).
5. Albert (d. 18 March 1413).
6. Waldemar V, Prince of Anhalt-Köthen (d. 1436).

Bef. 4 February 1419 Albert married for a second time to Elisabeth (d. 1452), daughter of Gebhard XI, Count of Querfurt and widow of Conrad (Kurt) of Hadmersleben, Lord of Egeln. They had three children:

1. Albert VI, Prince of Anhalt-Köthen (d. 9 January 1475).
2. Sophie, married to Gunther VI of Barby, Count of Mühlingen.
3. Dietburg (d. young).

Albert IV of Anhalt-Köthen House of Ascania Died: 24 November 1423
Preceded by John II	Prince of Anhalt-Zerbst; 1382–1396 with Waldemar III (1382–1391); Sigismund I (1382–1396)	Principality partitioned into Anhalt-Dessau and Anhalt-Köthen
New title Anhalt-Köthen partitioned from Anhalt-Zerbst	Prince of Anhalt-Köthen; 1396–1423	Succeeded by Adolph I and Waldemar V
