= Ernest I of Anhalt-Dessau =

German prince

Ernest I, Prince of Anhalt-Dessau
- Died: 12 June 1516; Dessau
- Noble family: Ascania
- Spouse: Margarete of Münsterberg-Oels
- Father: George I, Prince of Anhalt-Dessau
- Mother: Anna of Lindow-Ruppin

Ernest I, Prince of Anhalt-Dessau (died Dessau, 12 June 1516), was a German prince of the House of Ascania and ruler of the principality of Anhalt-Dessau. He was the second son of George I, Prince of Anhalt-Dessau, yet the first born by his fourth wife Anna, daughter of Albert VIII, Count of Lindow-Ruppin.

== Life ==
In 1473, after the death of his father, Ernest inherited the principality of Anhalt-Dessau alongside his younger brothers George II, Sigismund III, and Rudolph IV. Following the family law of the House of Ascania, the accession took place without any division of territories.

The deaths of Sigismund III in 1487, George II in 1509, and Rudolph IV in 1510 without surviving male issue left Ernest as the sole ruler of Anhalt-Dessau until his death.

== Marriage and issue ==
In Cottbus on 20 January 1494 Ernest married Margarete (b. Breslau, 25 August 1473 – d. Dessau, 28 June 1530), daughter of Henry I, Duke of Münsterberg-Oels, and granddaughter of George of Poděbrady, King of Bohemia. They had four sons:

1. Thomas (b. Dessau, 27 November 1503 – d. 1503).
2. John V, Prince of Anhalt-Dessau, later Anhalt-Zerbst (b. Dessau, 4 September 1504 – d. Zerbst, 4 February 1551).
3. George III, Prince of Anhalt-Dessau, later Anhalt-Plötzkau (b. Dessau, 15 August 1507 – d. Dessau, 17 October 1553).
4. Joachim I, Prince of Anhalt-Dessau (b. Dessau, 7 August 1509 – d. Dessau, 6 December 1561).

Ernest I of Anhalt-Dessau House of Ascania Died: 12 June 1516
Preceded by George I	Prince of Anhalt-Dessau with George II (until 1509) and Sigismund III (until 1487) and Rudolph IV (until 1510); 1474–1516	Succeeded by John V George III; Joachim I
