= Margaret of Münsterberg =

German regent (1473–1530)

- Born: 25 August 1473; Breslau
- Died: 28 June 1530 (aged 56); Dessau
- Noble family: Poděbrady
- Spouse: Ernest I, Prince of Anhalt-Dessau
- Issue: John V, Prince of Anhalt-Zerbst; George III, Prince of Anhalt-Dessau; Joachim I, Prince of Anhalt-Dessau
- Father: Henry the Elder of Münsterberg
- Mother: Ursula of Brandenburg

Margaret of Münsterberg (25 August 1473, Breslau – 28 June 1530, Dessau) was a German regent: Duchess of Anhalt by marriage to Prince Ernest I, she ruled the principality as a regent for her underage sons from 1516.

== Life ==
Margaret was the fourth child of the Duke Henry the Elder of Münsterberg (1448–1498) and his wife Ursula of Brandenburg (1450–1508). She received a strictly religious education from her parents. In 1494, she married Prince Ernest I of Anhalt from the line of Anhalt-Zerbst. After the other lines of the Anhalt family died out, Ernest could reunite the Principality of Anhalt for the first time since 1252. They took up their residence in Dessau.

Ernest died in 1516 and Margaret took up the regency of the principality for her underage sons John IV and George III. Her regency was characterized by thrift and deep religiosity. She strictly opposed the Reformation, which started spreading from neighbouring Wittenberg in 1517. She found an ally in her first cousin Albert, who was Archbishop of Magdeburg. In 1525, Margaret launched the League of Dessau, an alliance of Catholic princes opposed to the Reformation. Her oldest son, John IV, who had been co-regent since 1522 and her second son George, who later became co-ruler as George III, had already built up contacts with Martin Luther, but they did not lead their Principality into the Reformation until 1534 (with George III as the driving force), well after Margaret's death.

Margarethe of Münsterberg managed to regain some manors located east of Wörlitz, that had been pledged to neighbouring Electorate of Saxony. For this reason, the Folwark Münsterberg in Griesen was named after her.

== Descendants ==
- Thomas (1503–1503)
- John (1504–1550 or 1551)

married Margaret of Brandenburg (1511–1577), daughter of Elector Joachim I, Elector of Brandenburg of Brandenburg (1484–1535)

- George (1507–1553)
- Joachim (1509–1561)

== References and sources ==
- Wilhelm Hosäus (1884). "Margaretha, Fürstin zu Anhalt" . Allgemeine Deutsche Biographie (in German). Vol. 20. Leipzig: Duncker & Humblot. pp. 319–320.
