= Sigismund I of Anhalt-Dessau =

German prince

Sigismund I, Prince of Anhalt-Dessau
- Died: 19 January 1405; Coswig
- Noble family: House of Ascania
- Spouse: Judith of Querfurt
- Father: John II, Prince of Anhalt-Zerbst
- Mother: Elisabeth of Henneberg-Schleusingen

Sigismund I, Prince of Anhalt-Dessau (died Coswig, 19 January 1405), was a German prince of the House of Ascania and ruler of the principality of Anhalt-Zerbst until 1396, when he became the first ruler of the principality of Anhalt-Dessau. He was the eldest son of John II, Prince of Anhalt-Zerbst, by his wife Elisabeth, daughter of John I, Count of Henneberg-Schleusingen.

== Life ==
In 1382, after the death of his father, Sigismund inherited the principality of Anhalt-Zerbst jointly with his brothers Albert IV and Waldemar III. After the death of Waldemar in 1391, Sigismund and Albert became the sole co-rulers.

Five years later, in 1396, both brothers decided to settle upon a formal division of the principality of Anhalt-Zerbst. Sigismund assumed the title "Lord of Zerbst," but established the town of Dessau as his main residence and capital of his newly created principality of Anhalt-Dessau.

== Marriage and issue ==
In 1386, Sigismund married Judith (d. aft. 1411), daughter of Gebhard XI, Count of Querfurt. They had eleven children:

1. Sophie (d. 1419), married bef. 6 June 1415 to Burkhard IV of Barby, Count of Mühlingen.
2. Elisabeth (d. aft. 19 November 1413), married bef. 1402 to Albert IV, Count of Mansfeld.
3. Anna (d. young)
4. Margareta (d. young)
5. Waldemar IV, Prince of Anhalt-Dessau (d. aft. 22 July 1417).
6. George I, Prince of Anhalt-Dessau (b. ca. 1390 – d. Dessau, 21 September 1474).
7. Matilda (b. 1392 – d. 1463), Abbess of Gernrode (1439).
8. John (IV) (d. Dessau, 1455), a canon in Merseburg, Provost of Merseburg.
9. Sigismund II, Prince of Anhalt-Dessau (d. 22 May 1452).
10. Albert V, Prince of Anhalt-Dessau (d. ca. 1469).
11. Ernest (d. aft. 22 October 1405).

Sigismund I of Anhalt-Dessau House of Ascania Died: 19 January 1405
Preceded by John II	Prince of Anhalt-Zerbst; 1382–1396 with Waldemar III (1382–1391); Albert IV (1382–1396)	Principality partitioned into Anhalt-Dessau and Anhalt-Köthen
New title Anhalt-Dessau partitioned from Anhalt-Zerbst	Prince of Anhalt-Dessau; 1396–1405	Succeeded by Waldemar IV, George I, Sigismund II and Albert V
