= Joachim I of Anhalt-Dessau =

German prince

Joachim I
- Prince of Anhalt-Dessau
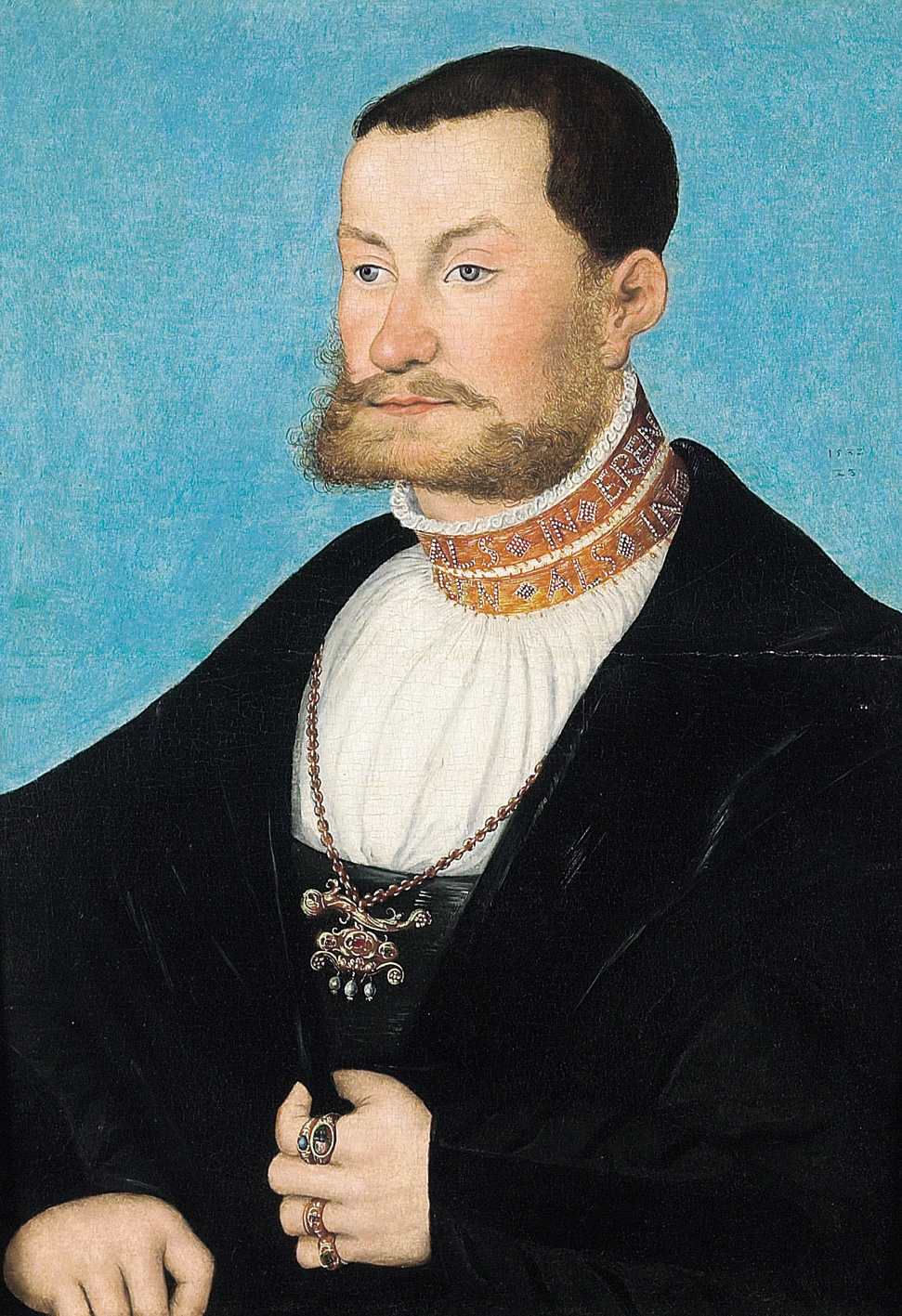
- Portrait by Lucas Cranach the Elder, c. 1532
- Born: 7 August 1509; Dessau
- Died: 6 December 1561 (aged 52); Dessau
- Noble family: House of Ascania
- Father: Ernest I, Prince of Anhalt-Dessau
- Mother: Margaret of Münsterberg

Joachim I, Prince of Anhalt-Dessau (Dessau, 7 August 1509 – Dessau, 6 December 1561), was a German prince of the House of Ascania and ruler of the principality of Anhalt-Dessau. After 1544 he served as the first ruler of the re-created Anhalt-Dessau.

He was the fourth (but third surviving) son of Ernest I, Prince of Anhalt-Dessau, by his wife Margarete, daughter of Henry I, Duke of Münsterberg-Oels and granddaughter of George of Poděbrady, King of Bohemia.

== Life ==
After the death of his father in 1516, Joachim and his older brothers John V and George III became the new rulers of the Anhalt-Dessau. During the first years of their reign, their mother acted as regent.

In 1544 the brothers agreed to a formal division of the principality. Joachim retained Dessau, this time as sole ruler. The re-created Anhalt-Dessau was much smaller than the earlier principality, however, due to the assignment of many territories to John V and George III.

After his death, unmarried and childless, Joachim was succeeded by his nephews, the rulers of Anhalt-Zerbst.

| Preceded by Ernest I | Prince of Anhalt-Dessau with John V and George III; 1516–1544 | Succeeded by Principality divided in Anhalt-Zerbst, Anhalt-Plötzkau and Anhalt-Dessau |
| Preceded by Principality (re-)created | Prince of Anhalt-Dessau; 1544–1561 | Succeeded by Joachim Ernest and Bernhard VII |
