= Waldemar VI of Anhalt-Köthen =

German prince

Waldemar VI, Prince of Anhalt-Köthen (1450 – Köthen, 1 November 1508), was a German prince of the House of Ascania and ruler of the principality of Anhalt-Köthen.

He was the eldest son of George I, Prince of Anhalt-Dessau, by his second wife Sophie, possibly a member of the House of Hohnstein.

== Life ==
In 1471, his father concluded a succession contract with Adolph I, Prince of Anhalt-Köthen. Under the terms of this contract, George I, Prince of Anhalt-Dessau, took over the government of half the principality of Anhalt-Köthen and became co-ruler with Adolf as "Mitherr." Shortly after, George renounced his rights in favor of Waldemar, who became the new co-ruler with Adolph I.

Adolph I died two years later, in 1473, and Waldemar then had to rule jointly with his half-brother and heir, Albert VI. The new Prince Albert died fifteen months later and was succeeded by his infant son Philip. Upon the death of Albert VI, two sons of Adolph I, Magnus and Adolph II, were included in the government of the principality.

During his lifetime, Waldemar also assumed the following titles: "Lord of Köthen" (in 1480), "Lord of Hoym" (in 1492), and "Lord of Burgscheidungen" (in 1496).

Philip died without issue in 1500 and Adolph I's sons formally renounced their rights to rule the principality eight years later. In consequence, Waldemar became the sole ruler of Anhalt-Köthen, but enjoyed this status for only a few months during the year 1508.

On his death, he was succeeded by his only surviving son, Wolfgang.

== Marriage and issue ==
In Köthen on 24 January 1485 Waldemar married Margarete (b. Rudolstadt, 16 June 1464 – d. Köthen, 1 August 1539), daughter of Günther XXXVI, Count of Schwarzburg and Lord of Arnstedt. They had four children:

1. Barbara (b. 1486 – d. 10 August 1532), married on 25 November 1503 to Henry IV, Count of Plauen and Burggrave of Meissen, and secondly ca. 1521 to Jan Maštovský z Kolowrat (they separated on 10 June 1528).
2. Waldemar (b. 1490 – d. young).
3. Wolfgang, Prince of Anhalt-Köthen (b. Köthen, 1 August 1492 – d. Zerbst, 23 March 1566).
4. Margaret (b. Köthen, 12 November 1494 – d. Weimar, 7 October 1521), married on 13 November 1513 to John, Elector of Saxony.

== Legacy ==
A silver coin from the reign of Waldemar VI and inscribed with the lettering 'VS' (for Waldemar Siegmund)is held in the Halle State Museum of Prehistory.

Waldemar VI of Anhalt-Köthen House of Ascania Born: 1450 Died: 1 November 1508
Preceded by Albert VI	Prince of Anhalt-Köthen with Adolph I until 1473 with Philip until 1500 with Magnus until 1508 with Adolph II until 1508; 1471–1508	Succeeded by Wolfgang
