= Anhalt-Dessau =

1396–1863 German principality

Principality (Duchy) of Anhalt-Dessau Fürstentum (Herzogtum) Anhalt-Dessau (German)
- 1396–1561; 1603–1863
- 19th century flag of the Anhalt duchies 19th century coat of arms of the Anhalt duchies

- The Anhalt principalities, with Anhalt-Dessau in green
- Status: State of the Holy Roman Empire (until 1806); State of the Confederation of the Rhine (1806–13); State of the German Confederation (from 1815)
- Capital: Dessau
- Government: Principality
- Prince
  - 1396–1405: Sigismund I (first)
  - 1751–1807: Leopold III (last)
- Historical era: Middle Ages
  - Partitioned from Anhalt-Zerbst: 1396
  - Partitioned to create A-Köthen: 1471
  - Partitioned to create A-Plötzkau and A-Zerbst: 1544
  - Annexed back to A-Zerbst (later: Anhalt): 1561–1603
  - Raised to duchy: 1807
  - Merged with Anhalt-Köthen: 1853
  - Duchy of Anhalt reunited: 1863
Preceded by	Succeeded by
Principality of Anhalt-Zerbst	Duchy of Anhalt
- Today part of: Germany

Anhalt-Dessau was a principality of the Holy Roman Empire and later a duchy of the German Confederation. Ruled by the House of Ascania, it was created in 1396 following the partition of the Principality of Anhalt-Zerbst, and finally merged into the re-united Duchy of Anhalt in 1863. The capital of the state was Dessau in present-day Saxony-Anhalt.

== History ==
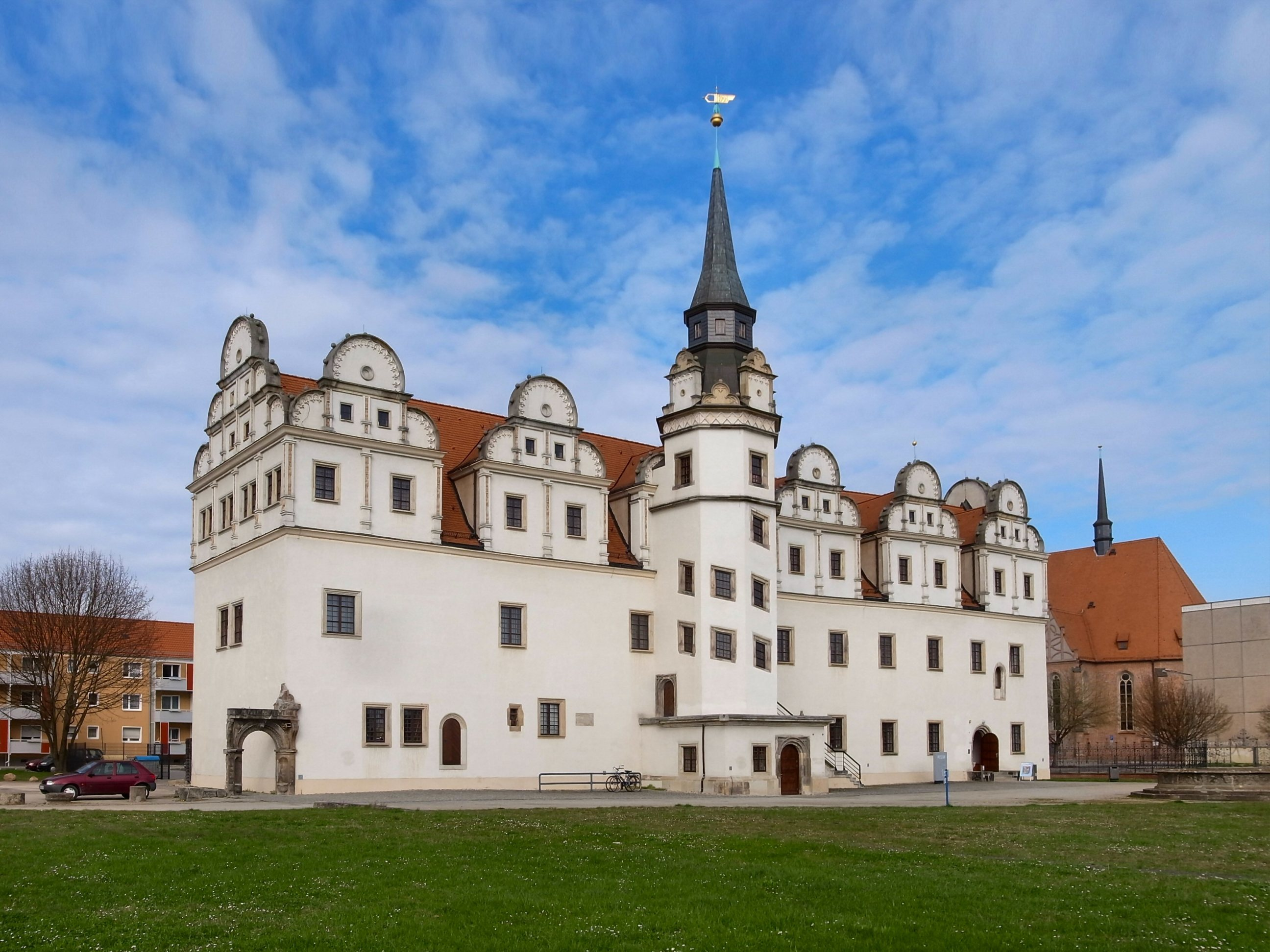
Johannbau, preserved west wing of Dessau Palace

The Principality of Anhalt arose in 1212 under its first ruler Henry I, son of the Saxon duke Bernhard III. Named after Anhalt Castle, the ancestral seat of the Ascanian dynasty near Harzgerode, the principality experienced a number of partitions throughout its centuries-long existence.

Anhalt after being divided among the sons of Henry I, 1259

The Anhalt territory was divided among the sons of Prince Henry I into the principalities of Anhalt-Aschersleben, Anhalt-Bernburg and Anhalt-Zerbst in 1252. In the course of the partition, Prince Siegfried I, the youngest son of Henry I, received the lands around Köthen, Dessau, and Zerbst. His son and successor Prince Albert I took his residence at Köthen Castle in 1295. In 1396, the surviving sons of Prince John II of Anhalt-Zerbst again divided their heritage. The elder Sigismund I became Prince of Anhalt-Dessau and took his residence at Dessau, while his younger brother Albert IV went on to rule as Prince of Anhalt-Köthen.

Upon the death of Sigismund's son Prince George I of Anhalt-Dessau in 1474, the principality was again divided with Anhalt-Köthen. Anhalt-Dessau was partitioned for a second time in 1544 with Anhalt-Zerbst and Anhalt-Plötzkau being created. From 1561 until 1603 Anhalt-Dessau was under the rule of the Prince of Anhalt-Zerbst, and in 1603 Anhalt-Dessau was recreated, being raised to a duchy in 1807.

Anhalt-Köthen became extinct on the death of the Duke of Anhalt-Köthen, 23 November 1847, and its territories were united to Anhalt-Dessau by Patent of 22 May 1853. Following the death of the last Duke of Anhalt-Bernburg on 19 August 1863, all of the Anhalt lands came under the rule of the Duke of Anhalt-Dessau who then took the new title of Duke of Anhalt for the newly created Duchy of Anhalt.

== Rulers of Anhalt-Dessau ==
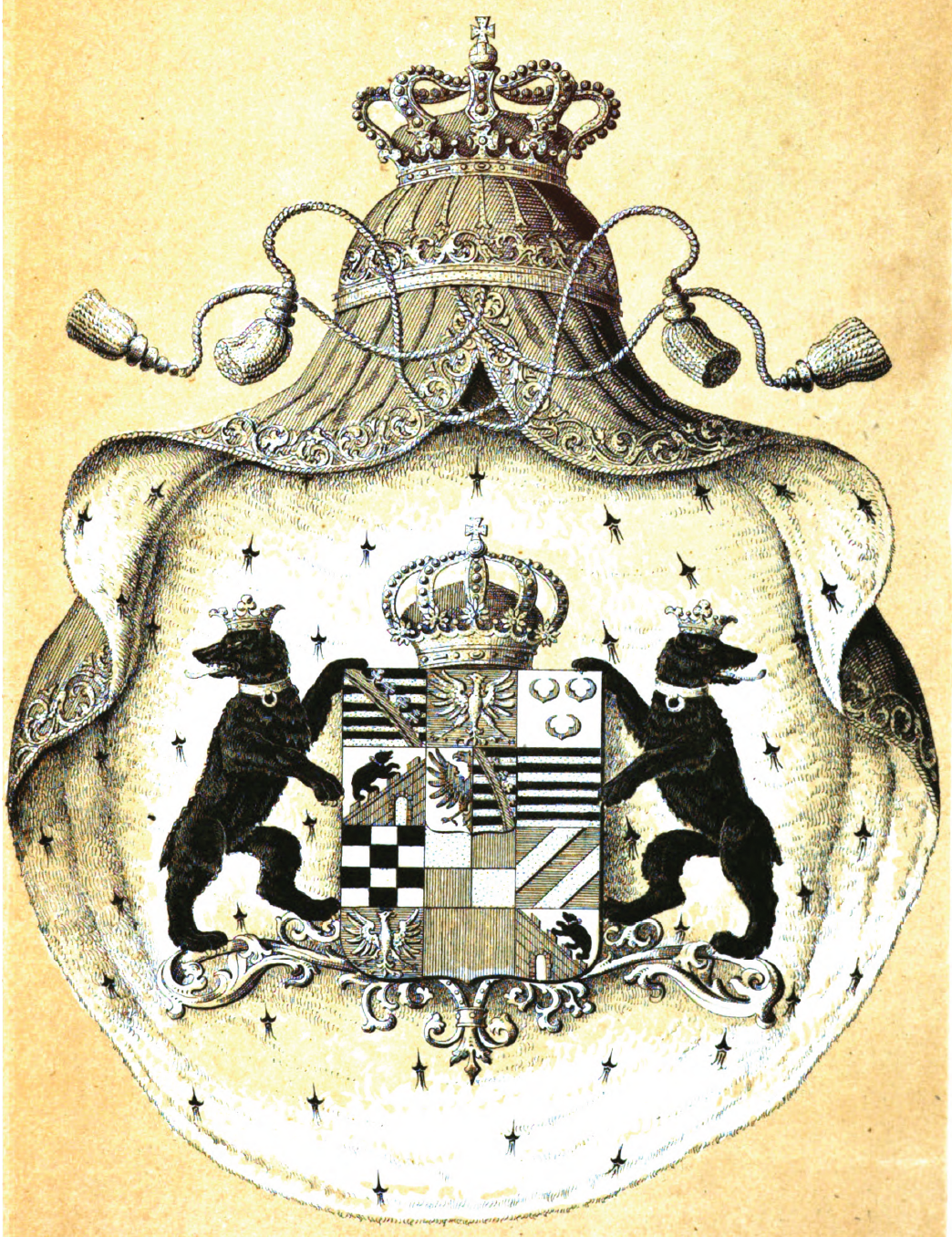
Coat of arms of Anhalt-Dessau-Köthen according to Siebmachers Wappenbuch

=== Princes (1396–1561) ===
- Sigismund I 1396–1405
- George I 1405–1474
  - Waldemar IV 1405–1417 (co-regent)
  - Sigismund II 1405–1452 (co-regent)
  - Albert V 1405–1469 (co-regent)
- Ernest I 1474–1516
  - George II 1474–1509 (co-regent)
  - Sigismund III 1474–1487 (co-regent)
  - Rudolph IV 1474–1510 (co-regent)
- Joachim I 1516–1561
  - John V 1516–1544 (co-regent)
  - George III 1516–1544 (co-regent)

To Anhalt-Zerbst 1561.

=== Princes (1603–1807) ===
- John George I 1603–1618
- John Casimir 1618–1660
- John George II 1660–1693
- Leopold I 1693–1747
  - Countess Henriette Catherine of Nassau regent 1693–1697
- Leopold II 1747–1751
- Leopold III 1758–1807
  - Prince Dietrich regent 1751–1758

Raised to Duchy 1807.

=== Dukes (1807–1863) ===
- Leopold III 1807–1817
- Leopold IV 1817–1863

Renamed Duchy of Anhalt 1863.
