= George I of Anhalt-Dessau =

German prince

George I, Prince of Anhalt-Dessau
- Born: c. 1390
- Died: 21 September 1474; Dessau
- Noble family: House of Ascania
- Spouses: Matilda of Anhalt-Bernburg; Euphemia of Oels; Sophie of Hohnstein; Anna of Lindow-Ruppin
- Father: Sigismund I, Prince of Anhalt-Dessau
- Mother: Judith of Querfurt

George I, Prince of Anhalt-Dessau (c. 1390 – 21 September 1474), was a German prince of the House of Ascania and ruler of the principality of Anhalt-Dessau. He was the second son of Sigismund I, Prince of Anhalt-Dessau, by his wife Judith, daughter of Gebhard XI, Count of Querfurt.

== Life ==
In 1405, after the death of his father, George inherited the principality of Anhalt-Dessau alongside his older brother Waldemar IV and his younger brothers Sigismund II and Albert V. By 1435, he adopted the style "Lord of Zerbst and Dessau" and styled himself "Lord of Köthen" from 1460.

In 1468 he inherited the principality of Anhalt-Bernburg, then three years later (in 1471) signed a succession contract with his first cousin Adolph I, Prince of Anhalt-Köthen, that named him as "Mitherr" (co-ruler) with rights to half of the principality of Anhalt-Köthen. George renounced his rights, however, in favor of his eldest son Waldemar VI, who became the new co-ruler of the principality of Anhalt-Köthen. The deaths of George's brothers between 1417 and 1469 without male heirs left him as the sole ruler of Anhalt-Dessau until his own death, which occurred in Dessau.

== Marriages and Issue ==
After 1413, George married Matilda (d. Coswig, bef. 1432), daughter of Otto III, Prince of Anhalt-Bernburg. The spouses were related to each other as direct descendants of Henry I, Count of Anhalt, through his sons Bernhard I of Anhalt-Bernburg (ancestor of Matilda), and Siegfried I of Anhalt-Zerbst (ancestor of George). The marriage was childless.

In 1432 George married for a second time to Euphemia (b. ca. 1404? - d. 27 November 1442), daughter of Konrad III the Old, Duke of Oleśnica and widow of Albert III, Elector of Saxony. They had six daughters:

1. Anna (d. 8 April 1492), married on 22 June 1461 to Henry II, Count of Plauen and Burgrave of Meissen (later were divorced), then for a second time in 1467 to John I, Count of Honstein-Heldrungen
2. Margarete (d. bef. 1516)
3. Hedwig (d. young)
4. Marie, nun at Brehna
5. Hedwig (d. bef. 1516), nun at Brehna
6. Barbara, nun at Brehna.

After 1442, George married for a third time to Sophie (d. 1451), possibly a member of the House of Hohnstein. They had three children:

1. Agnes (b. 1445 – d. Kaufungen, 15 August 1504), Abbess of Gandersheim (1485), of Neuenheerse (1486–1492) and of Kaufungen (1495)
2. Waldemar VI, Prince of Anhalt-Köthen (b. 1450 – Köthen, 1 November 1508)
3. Scholastica (b. 1451 – d. Gernrode, 31 July 1504), Abbess of Gernrode (1469).

On 7 September 1453 George married for a fourth time to Anna (b. ca. 1430 – d. Lippehne, 9 July 1513), daughter of Albert VIII, Count of Lindow-Ruppin and his wife Anna of Sagan (d. of Jan I of Żagań). They had nine children:

1. Ernest I, Prince of Anhalt-Dessau (d. Dessau, 12 June 1516)
2. George II, Prince of Anhalt-Dessau (b. 1454 – d. 25 April 1509)
3. Sigismund III, Prince of Anhalt-Dessau (d. 1456 – d. Dessau, 27 November 1487)
4. Anna (d. 10 October 1531), married on 20 June 1498 to John V, Count of Oldenburg-Delmenhorst
5. Rudolph IV, Prince of Anhalt-Dessau (d. 7 September 1510)
6. Bernhard (d. young)
7. John (d. young)
8. Henry (d. young)
9. Lorenz (d. young).

George I of Anhalt-Dessau House of Ascania Born: c. 1390 Died: 21 September 1474
Preceded by Sigismund I	Prince of Anhalt-Dessau; 1405 – 1474 with Waldemar IV 1405–1417; Sigismund II 1405–1452; Albert VI 1405–1469	Succeeded by Ernest I George II; Sigismund III; Rudolph IV
Preceded by Bernhard VI	Prince of Anhalt-Bernburg; 1468 – 1474	Succeeded by Ernest I George II; Sigismund III; Rudolph IV
