= House of Ascania =

German noble family

- Country: Germany, Russia
- Founded: 1036; 990 years ago
- Founder: Esiko, Count of Ballenstedt
- Current head: Eduard, Prince of Anhalt
- Final ruler: Joachim Ernst, Duke of Anhalt
- Titles: Count/Prince/Duke of Anhalt; Duke of Saxony; Margrave of Brandenburg; Duke of Saxe-Lauenburg; Duke of Saxe-Wittenberg; Elector of Saxony; Prince of Lüneburg; Empress and Autocrat of All the Russias; Empress consort of All the Russias
- Deposition: 1918 (Duchy of Anhalt)

Coat of arms of the Duchy of Anhalt

The House of Ascania is a reigning family historically documented since the 11th century. It is also known as the House of Anhalt, which refers to its longest-held possession. Their ancestral seats, Ballenstedt, Anhalt, Aschersleben, and Bernburg, are located in the present-day Anhalt region in Saxony-Anhalt. The ruins of Anhalt Castle are situated in the Harz Mountains northeast of Harzgerode. The name "Askanier" derives from the Latinization of their seat at Aschersleben. Since the late 17th century, only the Anhalt branch has survived. Albert the Bear became Duke of Saxony in 1138 and, with the control of the Margraviate of Brandenburg in 1150, the first Margrave in the formerly Slavic settlement area. In 1180, eastern parts of the Stem Duchy of Saxony passed to the Askanier Bernhard of Saxony. As Dukes of Saxe-Wittenberg, the family received hereditary electoral dignity in 1356. The family ruled Anhalt-Dessau, Anhalt-Bernburg, Anhalt-Köthen, Anhalt-Zerbst, Anhalt-Plötzkau, and Anhalt-Aschersleben. Alexius Friedrich Christian of Anhalt-Bernburg was the first of the Anhalt princes to gain the title of Duke in April 1806. The ducal title was adopted in Anhalt-Köthen and Anhalt-Dessau in 1807. Since 1863, only the Dessau line has existed, with Aribert of Anhalt abdicating in 1918 due to the November Revolution in the Duchy of Anhalt. Since 1963, Eduard, Prince of Anhalt has been the head of the family.

== History ==
=== Beginnings to 1212 ===
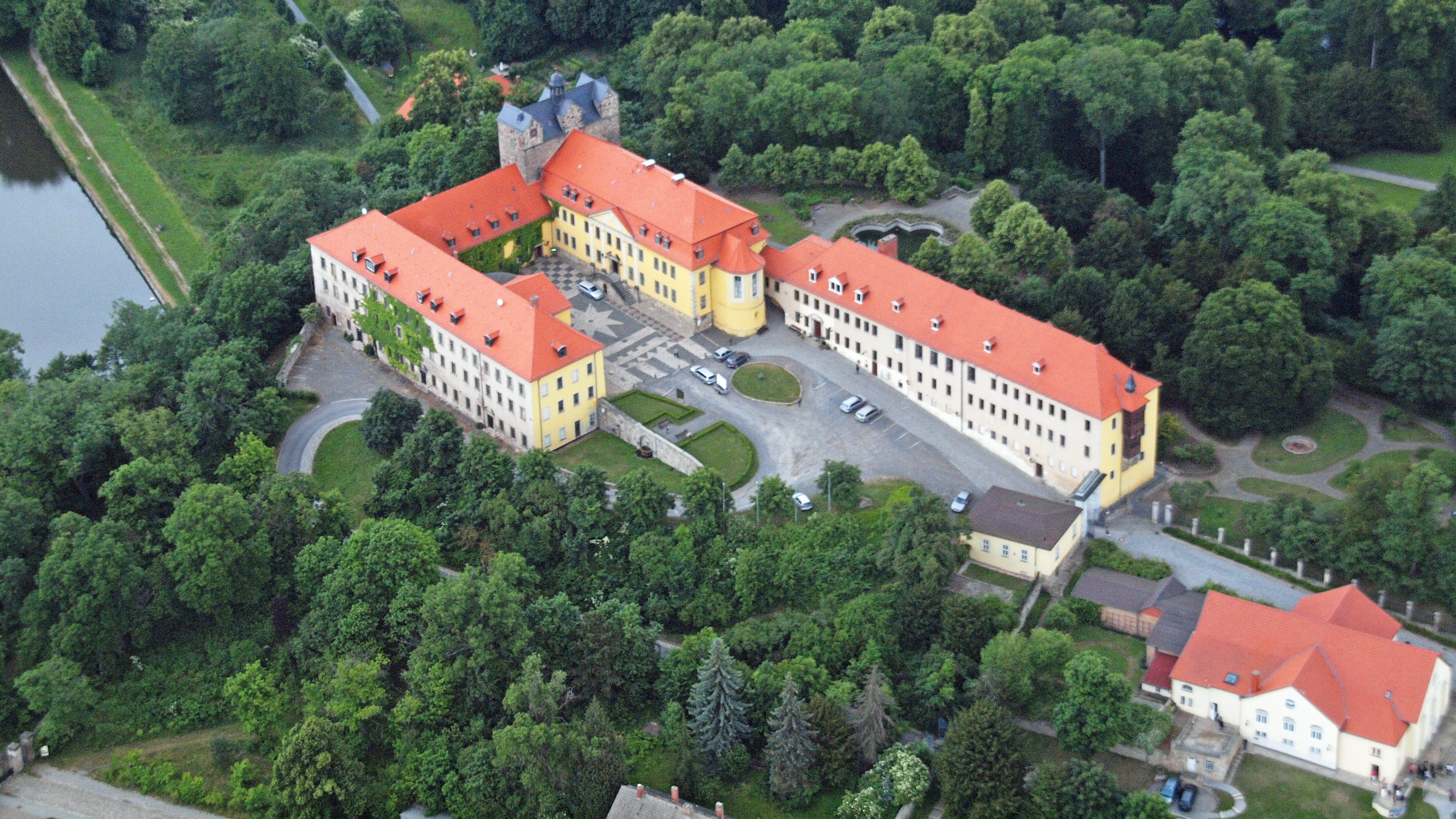
Ballenstedt Castle

The Askanier are documented as Counts of Ballenstedt, originating from an area now part of the Harz district in Saxony-Anhalt. From the outset, the family held possessions in the present-day districts of Salzlandkreis and Anhalt-Bitterfeld. Ballenstedt, Aschersleben, and ultimately Anhalt Castle were the most significant ancestral seats, with Ballenstedt as the eponymous seat in the 11th and the 12th centuries. Those possessions, along with further holdings in present-day Anhalt, led to the emergence of several Anhalt principalities in the 13th century. Numerous land divisions caused concentrated ownership in a single hand to be the exception over the centuries.

The earliest-known Askanier, Esico of Ballenstedt, is reported in older literature to have built Anhalt Castle. The ruins of Anhalt Castle are located on a spur of the Great Hausberg on the right bank of the Selke. The origins and the earlier history of the Ballenstedt family are unknown.

The family name, derived from Anhalt Castle, is still used by members of the house today. The term "Askanier" became a common designation for the Counts of Aschersleben starting in the 14th century. The Margraves of Brandenburg, Dukes of Saxony, and all other lines are also referred to as Askanier.

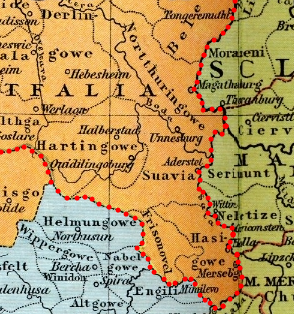
Schwabengau (Suavia) and Gau Serimunt. Eastern part of the Stem Duchy of Saxony in brown.

The family's history often begins in literature with an Askanier whose name is unknown. Traditionally, that figure is still referred to as Adalbert, though it is agreed that the name is merely speculative based on his grandson. He was married to Hidda, a daughter of Hodo I, Margrave of the Ostmark. Their children are typically listed as Esico, Theoderich, Ludolf, Uta, and Hazecha.

Esico of Ballenstedt is the first named ancestor and exercised comital rights. He is mentioned in contemporary documents, such as a diploma issued by Emperor Conrad II on October 26, 1036, at the Pfalz Tilleda (comitatu Esiconis, translated as "in the county of Esico"). His clan was based in the eastern Saxon Schwabengau, which is why they are classified in the Sachsenspiegel as part of the Swabian ancient nobility. The Schwabengau (Suavia) was a county located east of Quedlinburg.

The primary source for the genealogy of the early Askanier is the chronicle of the Annalista Saxo, written in the mid-12th century. According to it, Esico was maternally a grandson of Margrave Hodo († 993) and inherited several allodial estates in the Schwabengau and Serimuntgau after the death of his uncle Siegfried († c. 1030). The name of Esico's father is unknown; only in much later genealogies was he assigned the name Adalbert (I), as the Saxon annalist names the Count Adalbert (II), murdered around 1080, as Esico's son. On the present-day Schlossberg of Ballenstedt, Esico established the collegiate church St. Pancratius und Abundus, consecrated in 1046 in the presence of King Henry III. He was advocate of the monasteries Nienburg and Hagenrode.

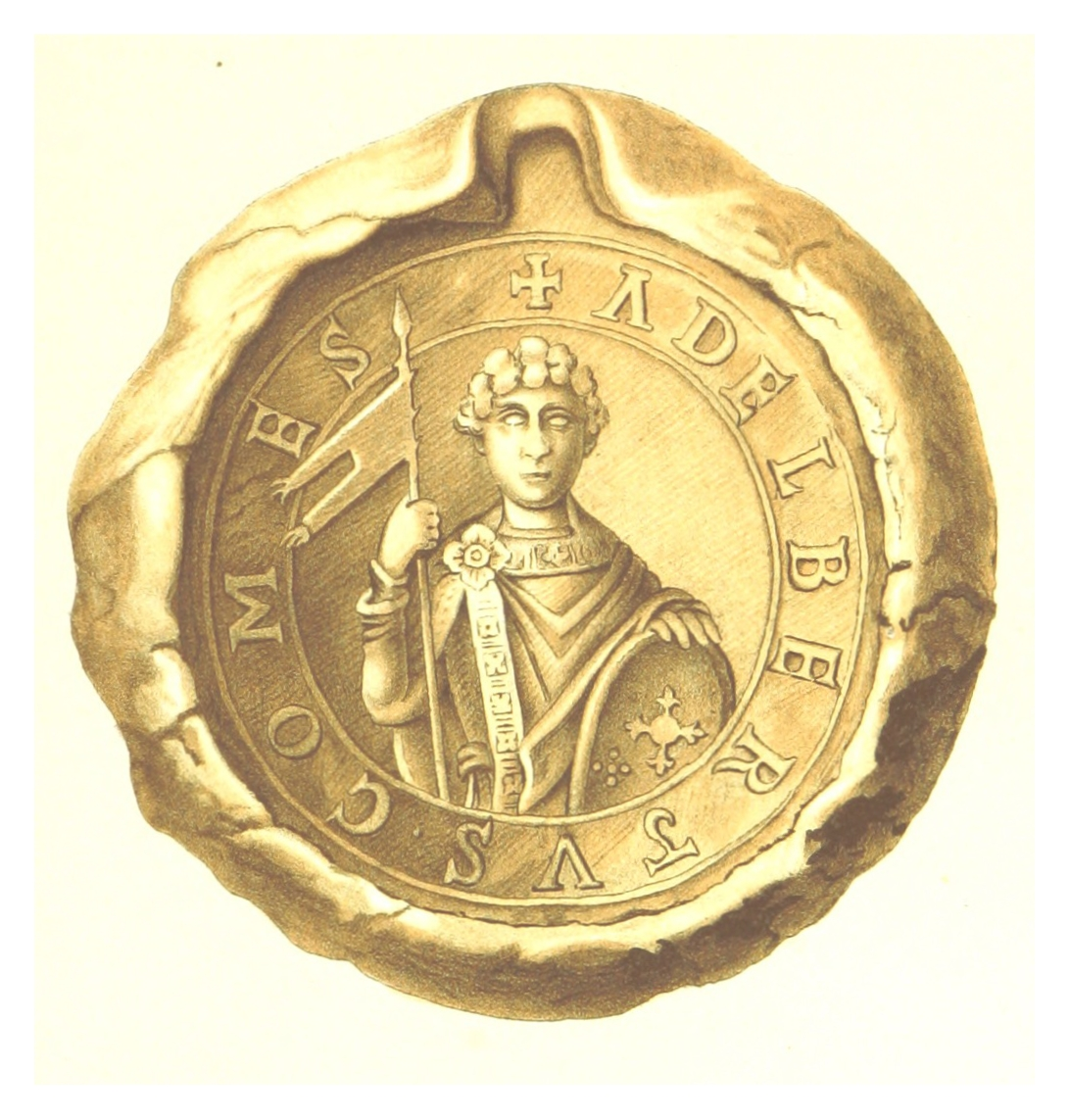
Adalbert II of Ballenstedt

Adalbert II of Ballenstedt, son of Esico and his wife Matilda, was a count in the Nordthüringgau and is mentioned in connection with the Nizizi and Serimunt counties. It is presumed that his mother was the daughter of Duke Herman of Swabia. He married Adelheid, daughter and heiress presumptive of Count Otto I of Weimar-Orlamünde, Margrave of Meissen, and had two sons, Otto the Rich and Siegfried. Adalbert was killed around 1080 by Egeno II of Konradsburg. While speculations about the motive exist, the reasons remain unclear. A seal depicting Adalbert exists, representing the earliest known stylized depiction of an Askanier.

The Saxon annalist referred to Esico, Adalbert II, and Otto the Rich as "Counts of Ballenstedt," but the title is historically verified only for Otto (Ottoni comiti de Ballenstide) in 1106. Thus, it is confirmed that he named himself after Ballenstedt Castle in the eastern Harz. Otto was briefly Duke of Saxony in 1112. He married Eilika, daughter of Duke Magnus of Saxony. He thus acquired Billung allodial estates and later received the Duchy of Saxony from the emperor. The count died in 1123 and was buried in Ballenstedt. His widow Eilika lived in Halle and Bernburg after his death. Otto the Rich and his son Albert the Bear converted the Ballenstedt collegiate church into a Benedictine monastery in 1123. His brother Siegfried was Count of Weimar-Orlamünde and Palatine of the Rhine.

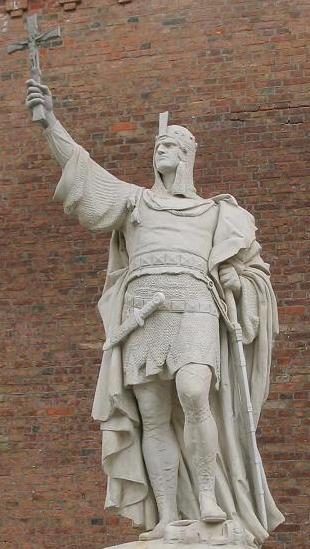
Monument to Albert the Bear in the Spandau Citadel, Berlin

Albert the Bear was the first significant family member and the most prominent Askanier in the Middle Ages. A contemporary and rival of Henry the Lion (Welfs) and Conrad the Great (Wettins), he significantly advanced the German settlement of Slavic border marks and founded the Margraviate of Brandenburg on the territory of the former Nordmark. He briefly served as Duke of Saxony before becoming Margrave of Brandenburg, establishing his family's power in the Saxon eastern marches. His extensive territorial possessions were divided among his sons Otto, Herman, Bernhard, and Adalbert. That created the four main Askanier branches at the time: Brandenburg (until 1320), Weimar-Orlamünde (until 1486), Saxe-Wittenberg (until 1422), Saxe-Lauenburg (until 1689) and Anhalt (to the present). Albert is referred to as a Count of Aschersleben, indicating that the title "Counts of Aschersleben" emerged in the 12th century. He was first documented as comes Asscherslovensis on August 8, 1147, during a court session he presided over. Whether Albert used that title himself is unclear, but he referred to himself as Margrave of Brandenburg in a document dated October 3, 1157 ("Adelbertus dei gratia marchio in Brandenborch"). The epithet "the Bear" was used in contemporary sources. Albert the Bear died in November 1170 and was almost certainly buried in the Ballenstedt house monastery. The bear is the heraldic animal of Anhalt. His son Bernhard used various Latin variants of Count of Aschersleben and later Duke of Saxony. The Gelnhausen Charter of 1180 included the division of the Stem Duchy of Saxony. In that arrangement, Bernhard was enfeoffed with the eastern part, which continued to bear the name Saxony. He received the ducal title the following year after the Erfurt Reichstag.

=== From 1212 to 1603 ===
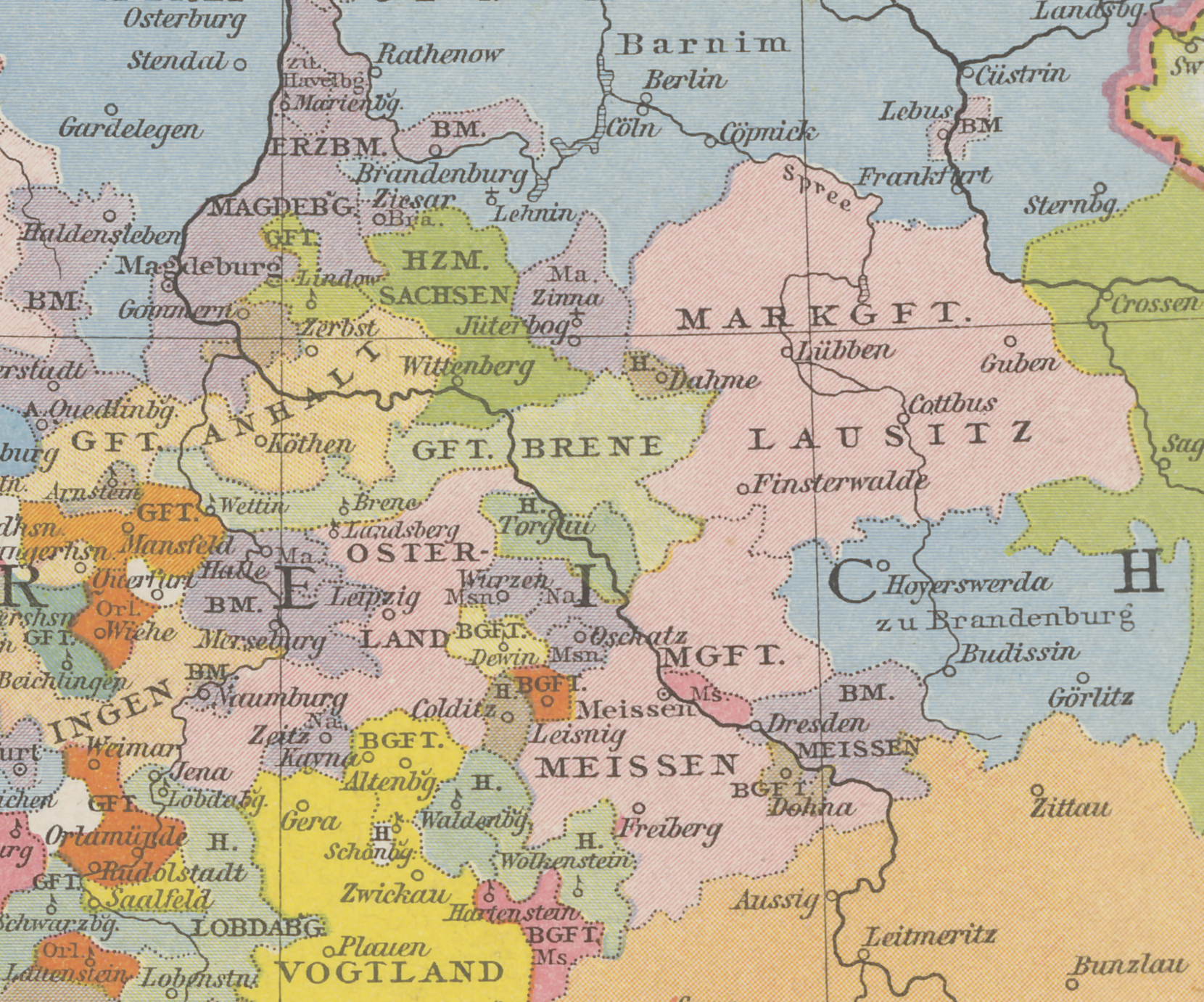
County of Anhalt in the 13th century

After the death of Bernhard III, Duke of Saxony, in February 1212 in Bernburg, his eldest son Henry received the Anhalt house estates between the Lower Harz and the lower Mulde River, while his brother Albert inherited the Duchy of Saxony. Their father Bernhard III inherited the County of Aschersleben from Adalbert, who had no male heirs. Although Albert held a higher title, Henry's possessions were securely in the family's hands. Part of the County of Anhalt was also allodial property. The division of 1212 marks the beginning of Anhalt's independent development, with Henry I as its first ruler. It is likely that he controlled a relatively cohesive area around Aschersleben, Ballenstedt, and Anhalt Castle, with a narrow connection to larger eastern complexes around Bernburg, Köthen, Wörbzig, Dessau, and Wörlitz, extending to the right bank of the Elbe around Coswig. Henry I of Anhalt appeared as Count of Askanien (comes Aschariae) in a document issued on November 4, 1213. Ascharia is a term used by the document's issuer. Henry I was also the first to be called Prince in or of Anhalt (comes Ascharie et princeps in Anahalt) and was also Count of Aschersleben. The prince was considered cruel, as he mistreated Abbot Gernot at Nienburg. In the early 14th century, family members used Anhalt as their designation, regardless of whether they held Anhalt Castle.

Anhalt after the division among the sons of Henry I in 1252

In the 13th century, the Anhaltiner were among the elite in their region, i.e., the Anhalt area. However, their significance declined sharply in the 14th and 15th centuries, as evidenced by their reduced imperial political influence and marriage alliances. Like other imperial princes, the Askanier benefited from the Statutum in favorem principum, enacted in 1231 at the Worms Hoftag, which regulated the sovereign rights of princes. The first formation of lines in the present-day Anhalt region occurred through the land division of 1252 among the sons of Henry I of Anhalt. Henry II founded the Aschersleben line, Bernhard I the Bernburg line, and Siegfried I the Köthen line. Alongside Köthen, Dessau and Coswig were part of the principality. Dessau later gained significance as a residence. Ballenstedt belonged to Anhalt-Aschersleben and gave the Askanier their name as Counts of Ballenstedt. The family ruled the Principality of Anhalt-Aschersleben until 1315. The Askanier acquired the lordship of Zerbst in 1307 from the lords of Barby, which was last administered by Anhalt-Köthen; the Principality of Anhalt-Zerbst was established in 1396.

Anhalt-Köthen was divided among the sons of John II, son of Albert II of Anhalt-Zerbst. The brothers Sigmund I, Albert III, and Waldemar III initially ruled jointly. Waldemar III died soon after, and in 1396, the Sigmundian line (Zerbst) and Albertine line (Köthen) emerged. Sigmund I received the land on the right bank of the Elbe, while Albert III received the land on the left bank. Albert III's sons Waldemar IV, Adolf I, and Albert IV had significant disputes with their cousin George I of Anhalt-Zerbst regarding possessions. The possessions were later redistributed. The Sigmundian line eventually gained partial ownership of the Albertine line, which ended at the beginning of the 16th century. The Bernburg branch expired in 1468, and its possessions passed to the Sigmundian line.

The Sigmundian line split again in 1474 into the older Dessau line (Anhalt-Dessau; Ernestine-Dessau branch) and the so-called older Köthen line (Anhalt-Köthen), here used to refer to the Waldemarian-Köthen branch. The death date of George I is used, though some sources cite the earlier division by him in 1471. The latter line expired with Wolfgang of Anhalt-Köthen in 1566, and the possessions had already passed to the older Dessau line in 1562. Wolfgang was the son of Waldemar VI of Anhalt-Köthen and grandson of George I. The older Köthen line acquired part of the Zerbst lands in 1508, which also passed to the older Dessau line. Around 1500, the Magdeburg Archbishop attempted to subordinate the principality to his own sphere of influence, which would have meant the loss of imperial immediacy. Through the Imperial Reform starting in 1500, imperial circles were created in the Holy Roman Empire. The principalities were part of the Upper Saxon Circle. Wolfgang of Anhalt-Köthen introduced the Reformation in 1525 and was a leading figure among Protestant princes. He signed the Augsburg Confession in 1530, was a co-founder of the Schmalkaldic League in 1531, and participated in the Schmalkaldic War in 1546.

In the mid-16th century, progressive legislation modernized administration. The older Dessau line split in 1546 into the Zerbst, Dessau, and Plötzkau branches. John V received the Zerbst lands, Joachim Dessau, and George III Plötzkau.

Since Wolfgang of Anhalt-Köthen († 1566) from the older Köthen line died childless, his lands passed to Joachim Ernst of Anhalt, son of John IV and part of the older Dessau line. Joachim Ernst unified all possessions in 1570 and moved his seat of government to Dessau.

=== Since 1603 ===
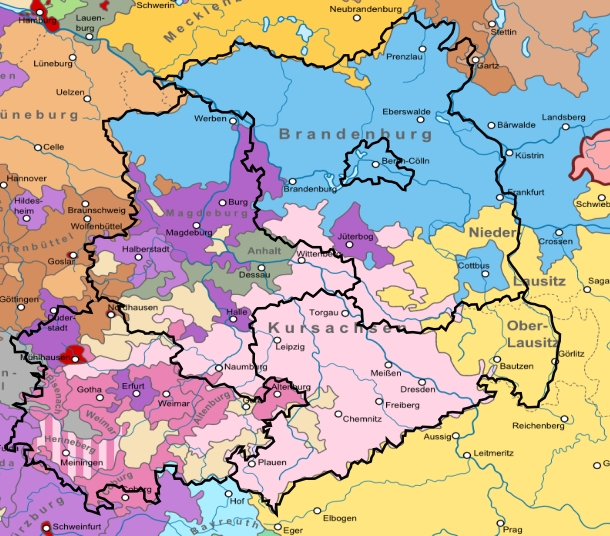
Anhalt (center, green) around 1600 (black lines: boundaries of present-day federal states)

In 1603, another division created the younger lines of Anhalt-Dessau, Anhalt-Bernburg, Anhalt-Köthen, and Anhalt-Zerbst. John George I became Prince of Anhalt-Dessau and received the town, office, and castle of Dessau with Schloss Lippene, the towns of Raguhn and Jeßnitz, and the offices of Wörlitz, Sandersleben, and Freckleben. Christian I ruled Anhalt-Bernburg with the town, office, and castle of Bernburg, Plötzkau, Hoym, Ballenstedt, Harzgerode, and Güntersberge. Rudolph founded the Anhalt-Zerbst line and held the town, office, and castle of Zerbst with Kermen, Lindau, Roßlau, and Coswig. Louis I established the Anhalt-Köthen branch and received the town, office, and castle of Köthen with Brambach, Wulfen, Nienburg, and the marks of Jeser, Baalberge, Warmsdorf with Kolbigh, and the Vorwerk Diebzig. August initially renounced land ownership for a settlement but, after renegotiations in 1611, received Plötzkau from the Bernburg share, though without sovereign rights.

The division of possessions was significant only within the overall principality. Externally, the principality spoke with one voice, remaining undivided. Anhalt-Plötzkau existed until the mid-17th century and then passed to Anhalt-Bernburg. Anhalt-Köthen expired in 1665. The Anhalt-Plötzkau line inherited that possession and renamed itself Anhalt-Köthen.

Emperor Francis II granted the Prince of Anhalt-Bernburg the right to be called "Duke" in 1806. In 1807, Anhalt-Dessau and Anhalt-Köthen were also elevated to duchies by Napoleon Bonaparte. The Zerbst branch died out in 1793, the Köthen line in 1847, and the Bernburg line in 1863. Thus, in 1863, the Duchy of Anhalt (Anhalt-Dessau line) was formed with Dessau as its residence, remaining the sole ruling territory until the abdication in 1918.

Less significant lines included Anhalt-Köthen-Pless (1755 to mid-19th century), Anhalt-Bernburg-Schaumburg (1707–1812), and Anhalt-Harzgerode (1635–1709).

After the Askaniers abdicated, Ballenstedt Castle remained the family's residence. Joachim Ernst, the last duke, married Elisabeth Strickrodt in March 1927; the marriage was dissolved in 1929. In October 1929, he married Edda-Charlotte von Stephani-Marwitz, producing the children Marie Antoinette, Anna Luise, Leopold Friedrich, Edda, and Eduard. Joachim Ernst was arrested by the Nazis in January 1944 and held for three months in Dachau near Munich. In September 1945, he was arrested by Soviet occupation forces and taken to NKVD special camp Nr. 2 near Weimar, where he died in February 1947. His rehabilitation by the Russian state occurred in 1992. From 1947, his son Leopold Friedrich was head of the house, and since 1963, his son Eduard has been.

=== Today ===
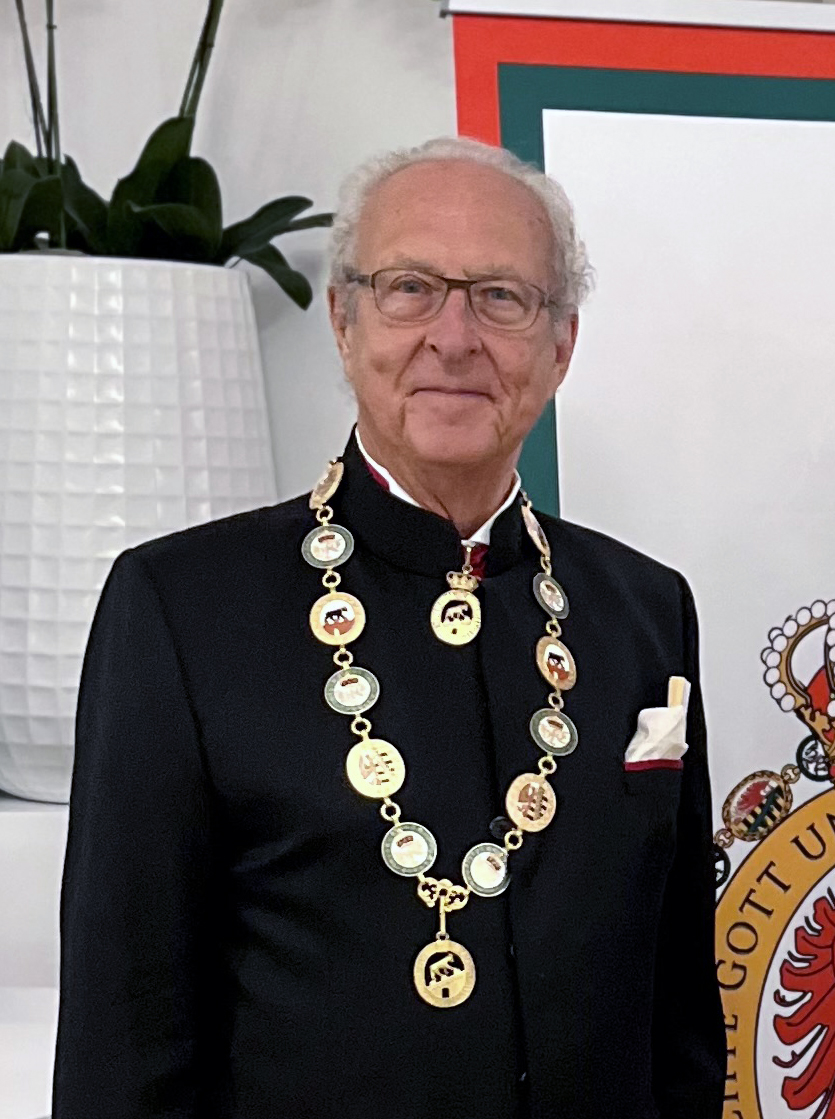
Eduard, Prince of Anhalt (2023)

Since 1963, Eduard has served as the head of the family. Born in 1941 in Ballenstedt, he succeeded his older brother Leopold Friedrich, who died in a traffic accident. Both are sons of Joachim Ernst, who was the last duke, still a minor in 1918. The family uses the traditional style of a reigning ducal family, "Highness," applied to both the head and other family members. Eduard, Prince of Anhalt, is the last male Askanier; the family will become extinct in the male line upon his death. The current head of the family and his three daughters are the only legitimate descendants of the Askanier in the agnatic line. Two morganatic lines, the Counts of Westarp and of Waldersee, descend from non-house-law-compliant marriages of two Anhalt princes. Eduard, Prince of Anhalt, is related to British King Charles III and had initial contact with the Windsors in 1947 when his mother was invited to Buckingham Palace in London. Familial ties exist through his great-uncle Aribert of Anhalt, who was married to a granddaughter of Queen Victoria.

In January 2010, the head of the house issued the "Dessau Declaration," amending the house law to introduce female succession. Thus, his eldest daughter, Julia Katharina, is designated as the future head of the House of Anhalt. That is a novelty within the German formerly reigning houses. The unconventional nature of absolute primogeniture allowing a female successor, the non-noble marriage of the designated heiress and questions about whether monarchical house laws can be amended after the monarchy's abolition have caused the decision to be controversial among conservative representatives of so-called noble associations, and the daughters' descendants are not yet included in the Gotha Genealogical Handbook.

Heads of the House of Anhalt

- 1947–1963 Leopold Friedrich (* 1938; † 1963), son of Joachim Ernst
- Since 1963 Eduard (* 1941), brother

== Territories of rule ==
=== General overview ===
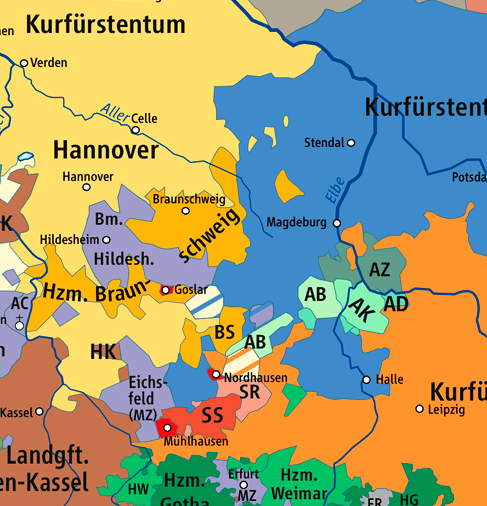
Principalities in 1789: Anhalt-Bernburg (AB), Anhalt-Köthen (AK), Anhalt-Dessau (AD), and Anhalt-Zerbst (AZ); right on the map: Electorate of Brandenburg (blue) and Electorate of Saxony (orange)

In the Anhalt Region: Anhalt-Aschersleben (1252–1315); Anhalt-Bernburg (1252–1468 and 1603–1863); Anhalt-Köthen (from 1252, from 1603, and 1665–1847); Anhalt-Dessau (from 1474, from 1546, and 1603–1863); Anhalt-Zerbst (from 1396, from 1544(?), and 1603–1793); Duchy of Anhalt (1863–1918); Anhalt-Plötzkau (from 1544 and 1611–1665); Anhalt-Harzgerode (c. 1635–1709); Anhalt-Bernburg-Schaumburg-Hoym (1707–1812); Anhalt-Köthen-Pless (1755–c. 1840)	Outside Anhalt: Margraviate of Brandenburg (until 1320); Duchy of Saxony (later Wittenberg and Lauenburg); Lüneburg (until 1388); Saxe-Wittenberg (until 1422); Weimar-Orlamünde (until 1486); Saxe-Lauenburg (until 1689)

=== Overview of land divisions ===
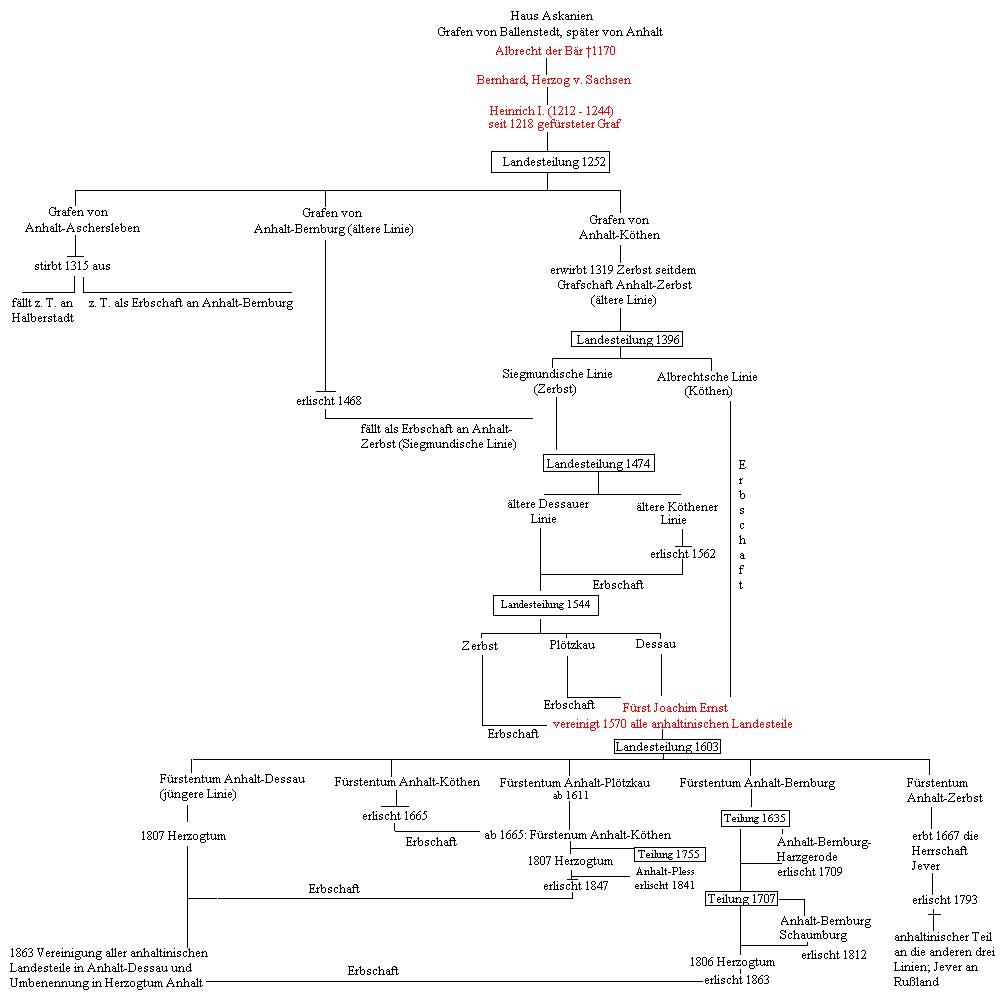

Note: The Albertine line expired with Adolph II of Anhalt-Köthen and Magnus of Anhalt, who renounced governance in 1508.

== Rule in Anhalt ==
=== Anhalt-Aschersleben ===
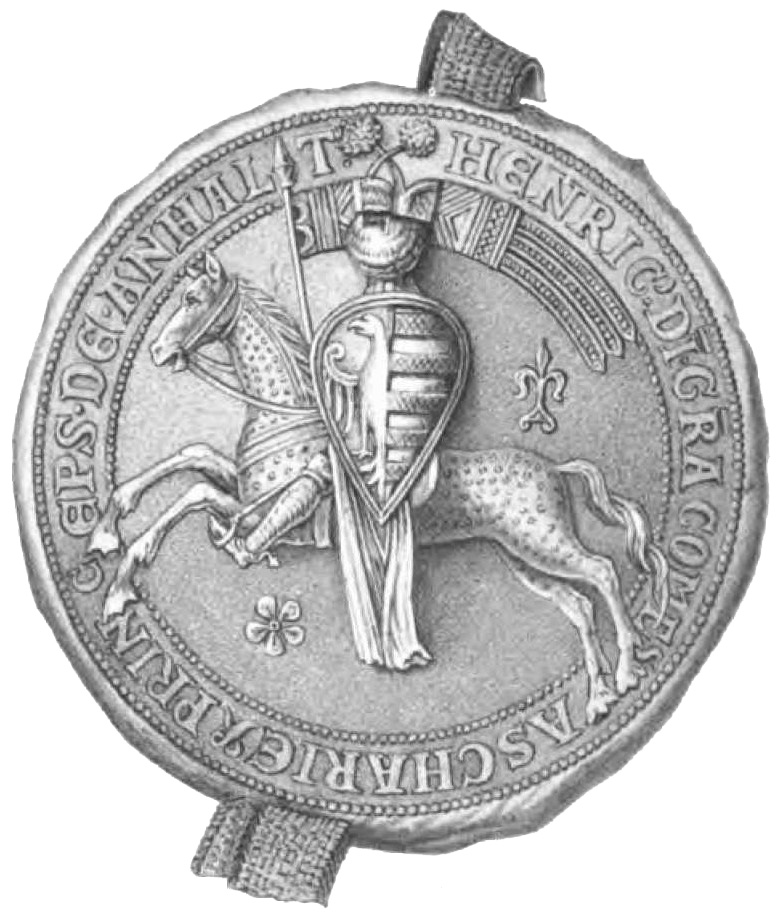
Seal of Heinrich II.

The allodial estates of the Ascanians between the Harz and Elbe remained with the Anhalt line after the 1212 division. Henry II. was the son of Henry I. of Anhalt and founded the Anhalt-Aschersleben line in 1252. He received the territories of Aschersleben, Gernrode, Hecklingen, Ermsleben, and Wörbzig. The Anhalt-Aschersleben region also included Ballenstedt and Anhalt Castle. The Ascanians originated from this area. The principality passed to the Diocese of Halberstadt in 1315, and with it, to the Margraviate of Brandenburg in 1648. The Bishop of Halberstadt enfeoffed Bernhard II. of Anhalt-Bernburg in December 1316, transferring Anhalt-Aschersleben as a fief to Anhalt-Bernburg.

=== Principality of Anhalt-Bernburg ===
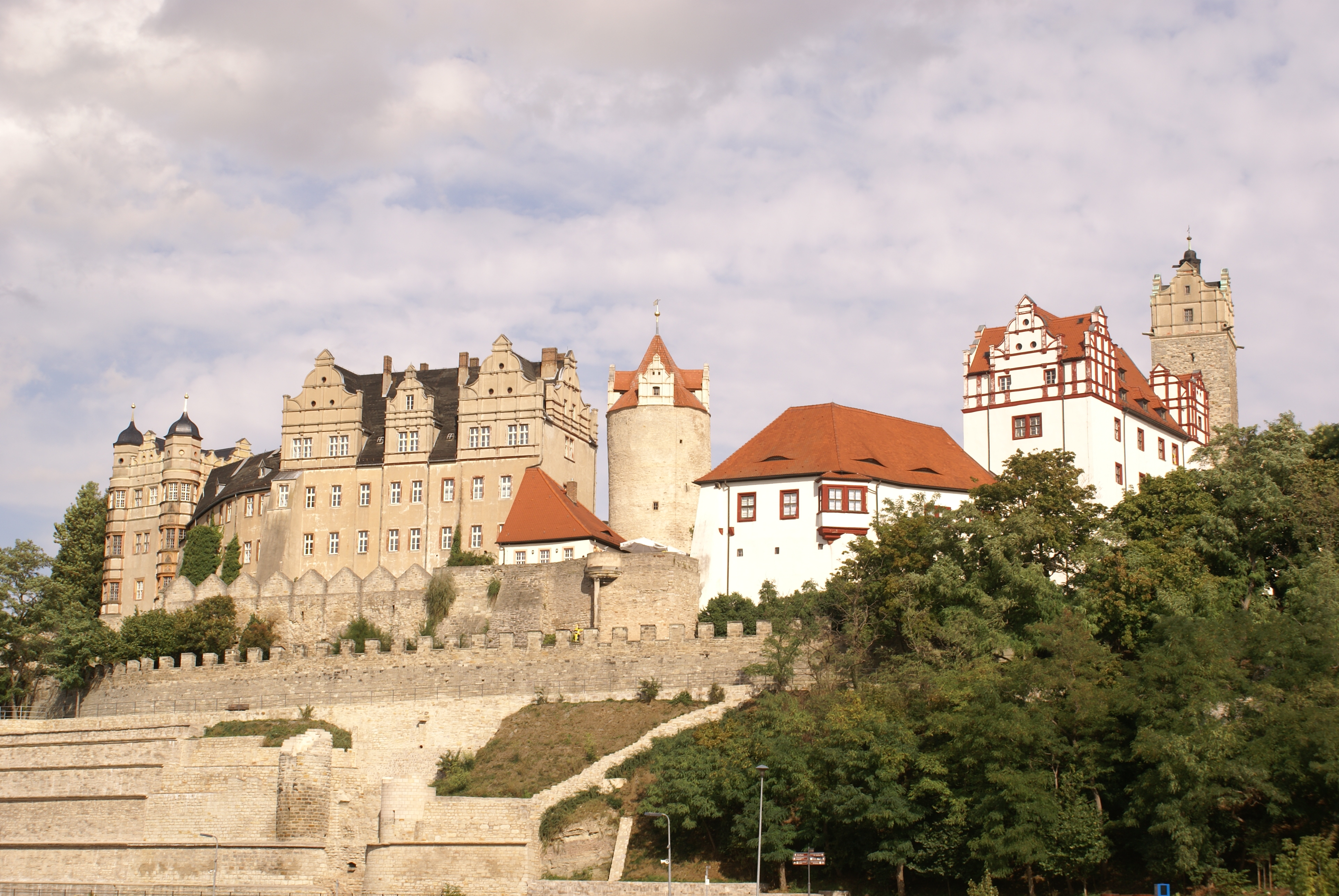
Bernburg Castle

Bernhard I. (* 1218; † 1287) was born as the son of Henry I. of Anhalt and founded the old Bernburg line. Prince Bernhard III. of Anhalt was the first in 1320 to call himself comes Ascanie. Nineteenth-century historiography then applied this term to all members of the family of the Counts of Ballenstedt and Aschersleben since the 11th century. After the death of Bernhard VI in 1468, George I. of Anhalt-Zerbst inherited the possessions. A castle complex in Bernburg is mentioned in 961 and 1138, though the former date is uncertain. Under Wolfgang of Anhalt-Köthen, the Wolfgangsbau was constructed at Bernburg Castle in 1538/1539, located at the site of the former hillfort.

Christian I. of Anhalt-Bernburg became the governor of the Upper Palatinate in 1595 in the service of Elector Frederick IV. of the Palatinate and resided in Amberg. He represented Frederick IV at the founding of the Protestant Union. In 1619, he had significant influence in the election of his employer Frederick V. of the Palatinate as King of Bohemia.

Emperor Francis II. elevated Prince Alexius Frederick Christian to Duke in April 1806. Anhalt-Bernburg passed to Leopold IV of Anhalt-Dessau after the reign of Alexander Charles (* 1805; † 1863).

=== Principality of Anhalt-Köthen ===
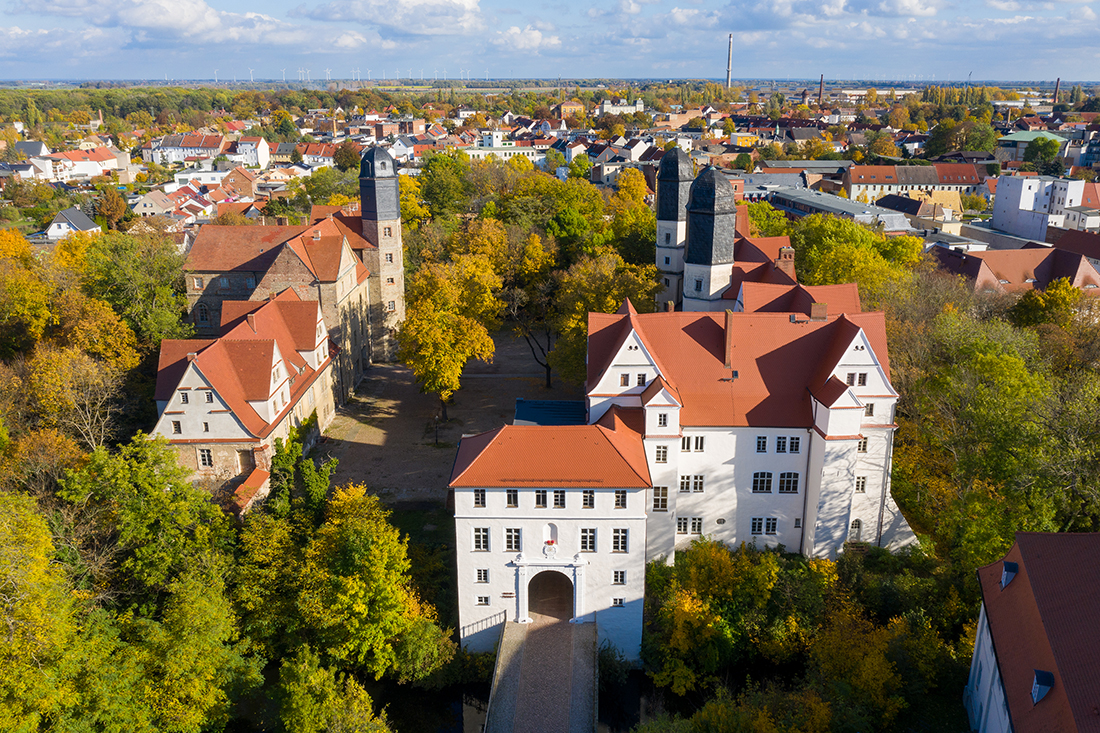
Köthen Castle

Siegfried I. († 1298) was the son of Henry I of Anhalt and received Köthen; his territory was to the right of the Saale and partly to the right of the Elbe. In 1272, he founded the Augustinian nunnery at Coswig, whose collegiate church was St. Nicolai. In older literature, the Anhalt-Köthen line is sometimes referred to as the old Zerbst line. Siegfried's sons were Albert I., Henry, Siegfried II, and Hermann.

The Anhalt-Köthen line adopted the ducal title from 1807. Henry (* 1778; † 1847) was the last Duke of Anhalt-Köthen. The land passed to the lines of Anhalt-Bernburg (administered by Anhalt-Dessau) and Anhalt-Dessau. No division occurred due to the anticipated extinction of the Bernburg line and the subsequent inheritance by Anhalt-Dessau.

=== Principality of Anhalt-Zerbst ===
The possessions were administered jointly with Köthen and Dessau before 1396. John VI. publicly introduced the Lutheran confession in 1644, and Calvinist preachers were subsequently replaced. In May 1681, the foundation stone was laid for the main part of Zerbst Castle. The Zerbst line ceased in 1793, and the possessions passed to the other brothers in 1797. The Köthen line ended in 1847, and Köthen was unified with Dessau in 1853. After the Bernburg line also became extinct in 1863, the Duchy of Anhalt was formed under Leopold IV († 1871). Anhalt-Zerbst acquired the Lordship of Jever through inheritance in 1667.

Until 1797, Roßlau was a Quedlinburg fief held by the Prince of Anhalt-Zerbst, then passed to Anhalt-Köthen, where it formed the "New Köthen" part, and finally to Anhalt-Dessau in 1847.

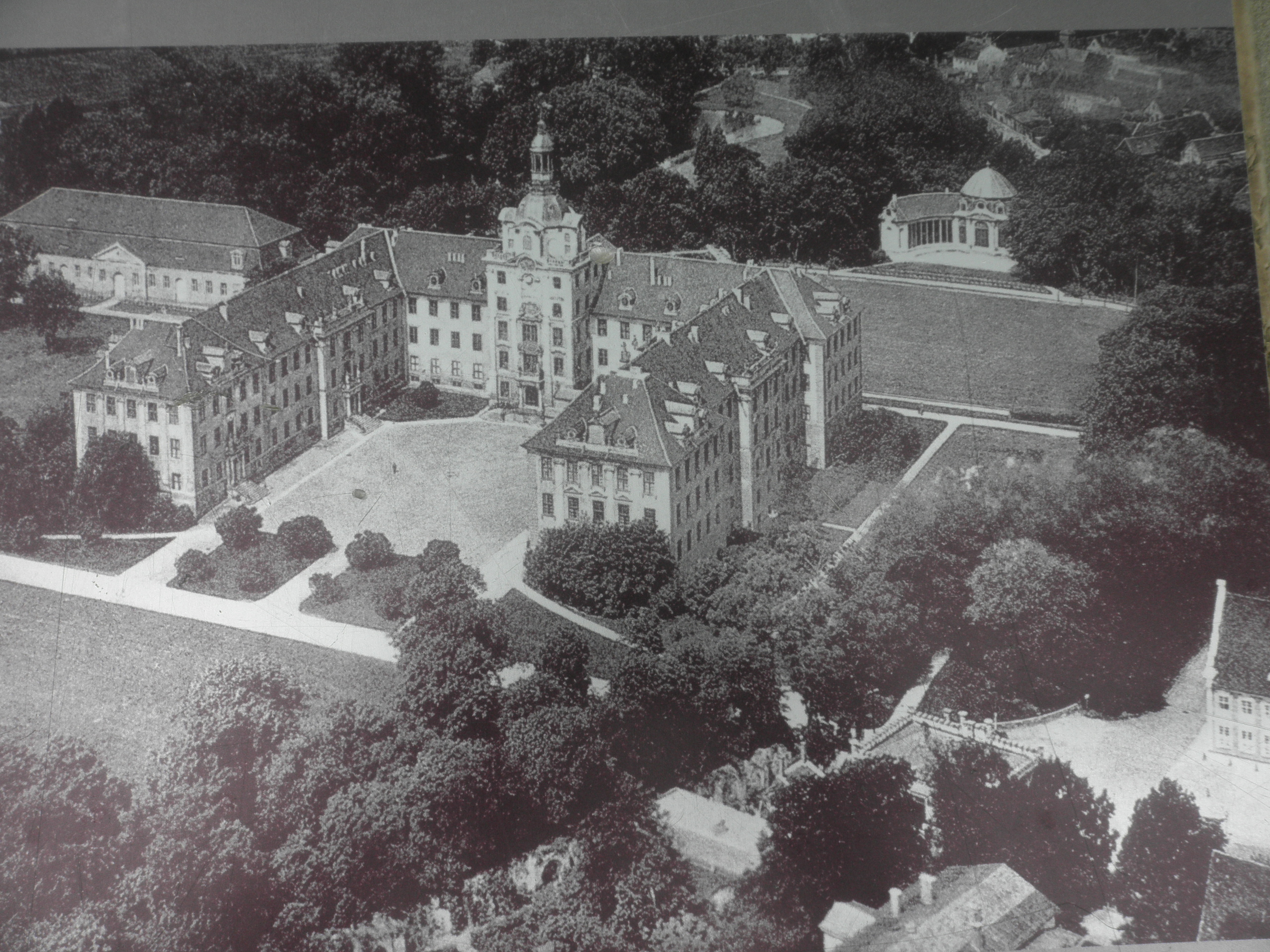
Zerbst Castle (historical photograph)

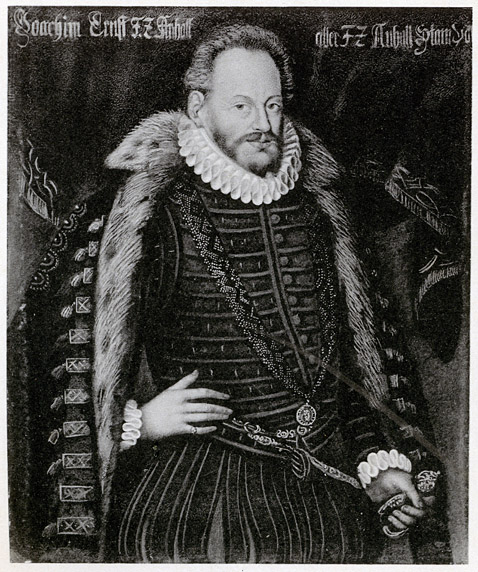
Joachim Ernest ruled all of Anhalt from 1570.

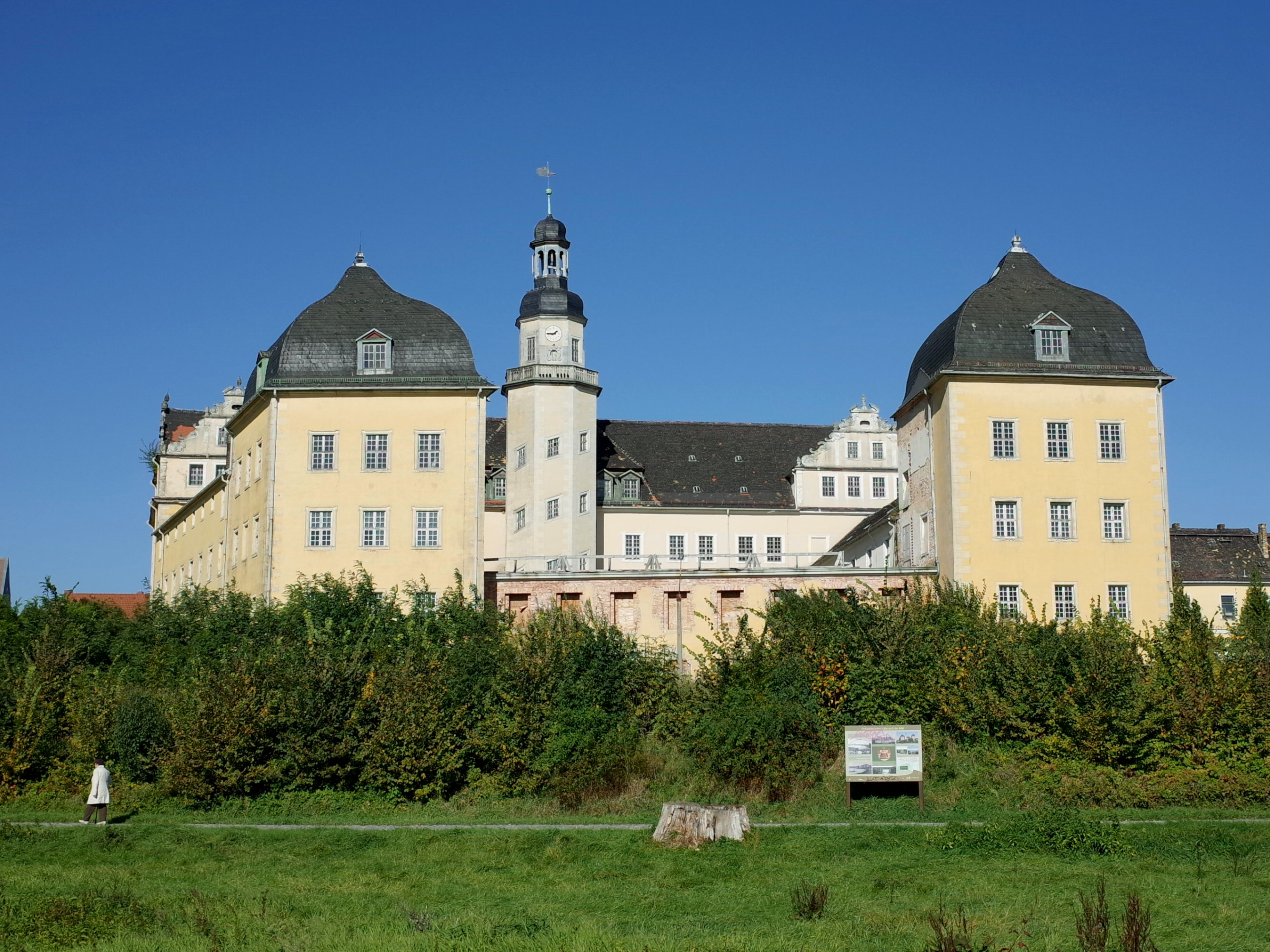
Coswig Castle, built 1667–1677 as a widow's residence

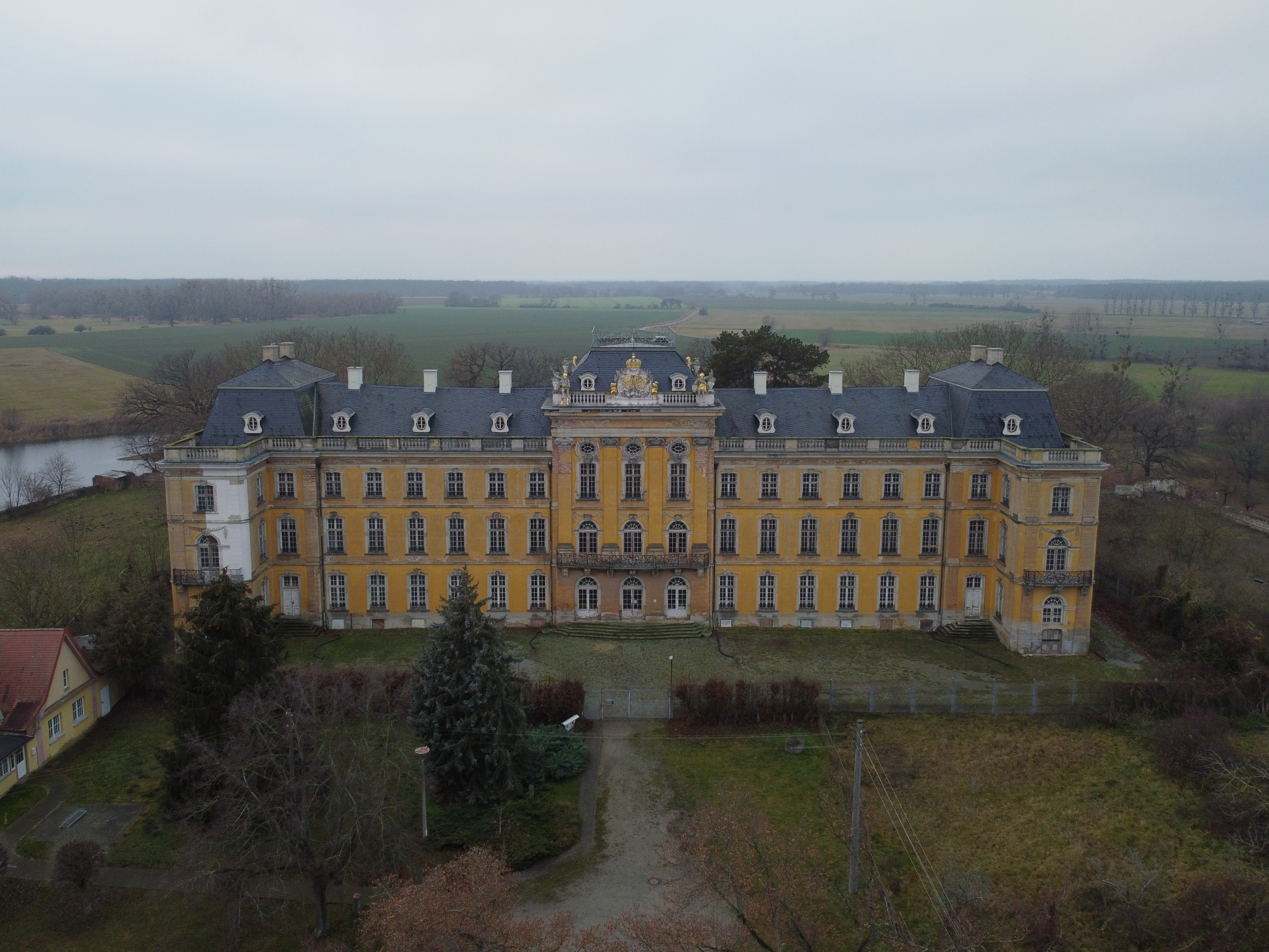
Dornburg Castle, built from 1750 as a widow's residence for the dowager princess Joanna Elisabeth, mother of Catherine the Great

=== Principality of Anhalt-Dessau ===
Anhalt in the 18th century with Bernburg, Köthen, Zerbst, and Dessau

A separate cadet line of the princely house in Dessau emerged in 1474. Ernest († 1516) was born as the son of George I. of Anhalt-Zerbst and founded the Ernestine-Dessau line (Anhalt-Dessau). His brother Sigismund III. died in 1487 and was also a Prince of Anhalt-Dessau. The construction of the Dessau Palace is generally believed to have begun around 1530.

In 1660, John George II. succeeded his father John Casimir as regent. Under his rule, Großalsleben was added to the possessions. For his wife Henriette Catherine from the House of Orange-Nassau, Oranienbaum Palace was built east of Dessau from 1681. John George II was a brother-in-law of Elector Frederick William of Brandenburg.

Leopold III created the Wörlitz Park, an English landscape garden.

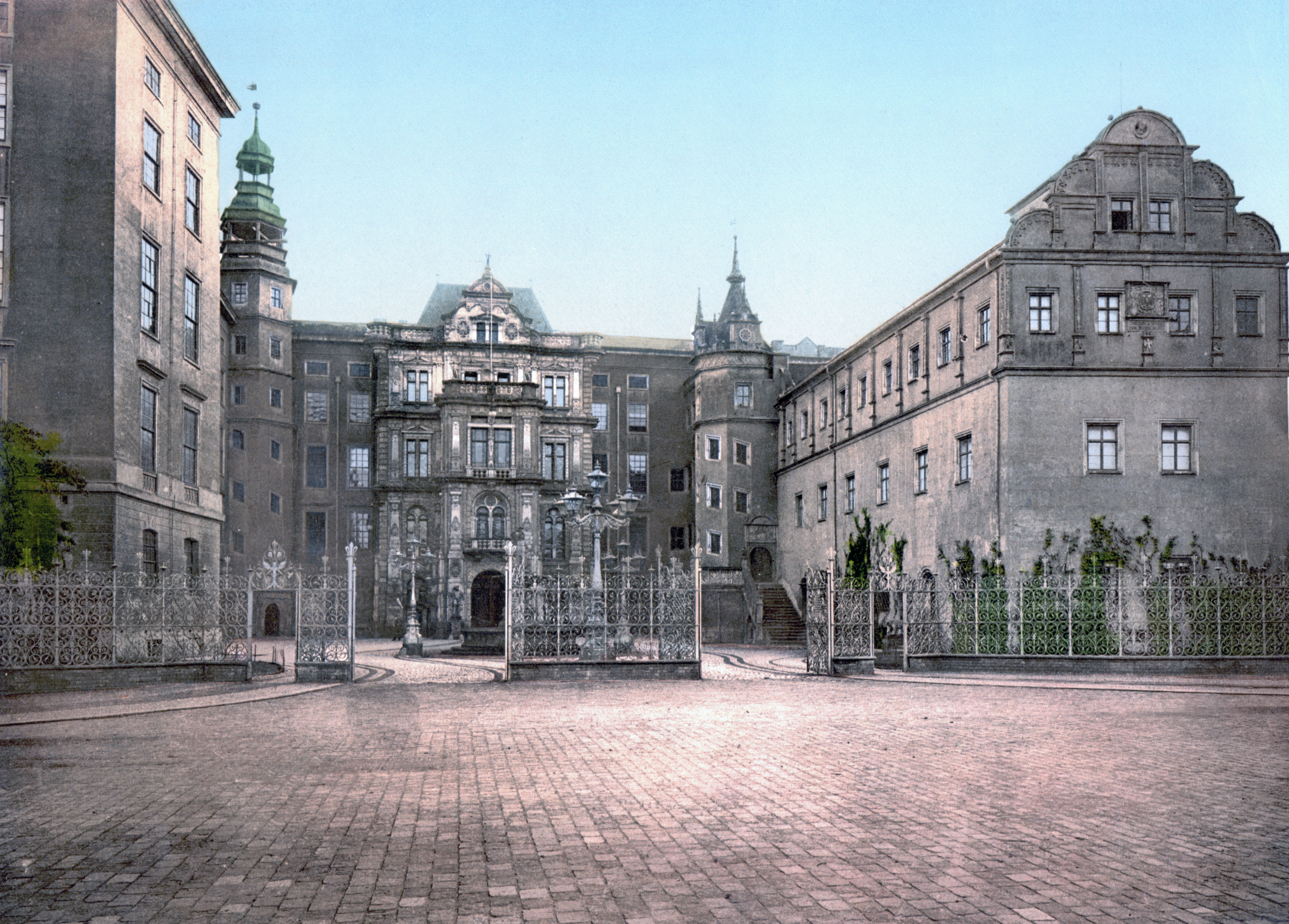
Dessau Palace, photograph c. 1900

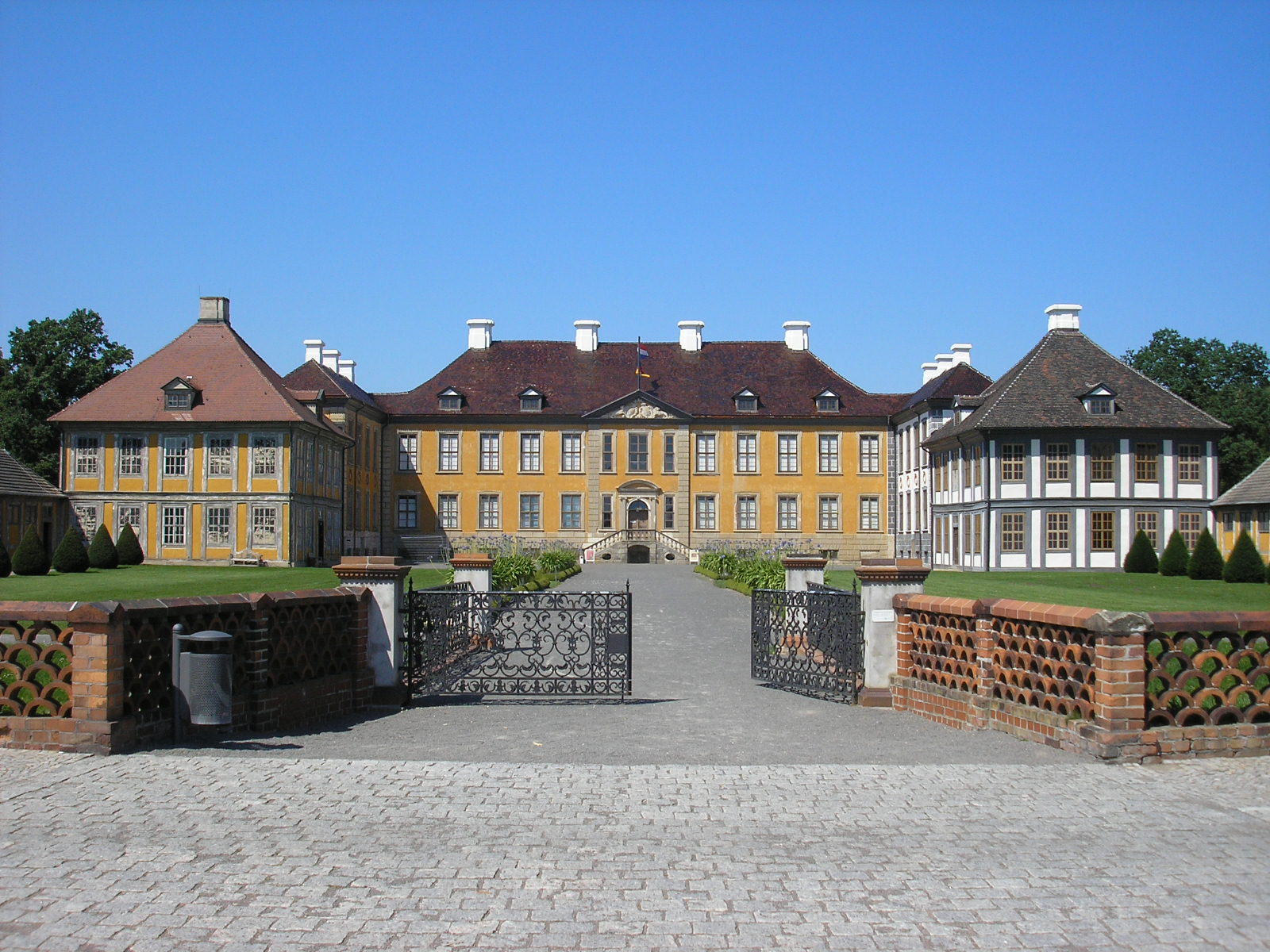
Oranienbaum Palace, from 1683 summer residence of Henriette Catherine of Orange-Nassau, wife of Prince John George II

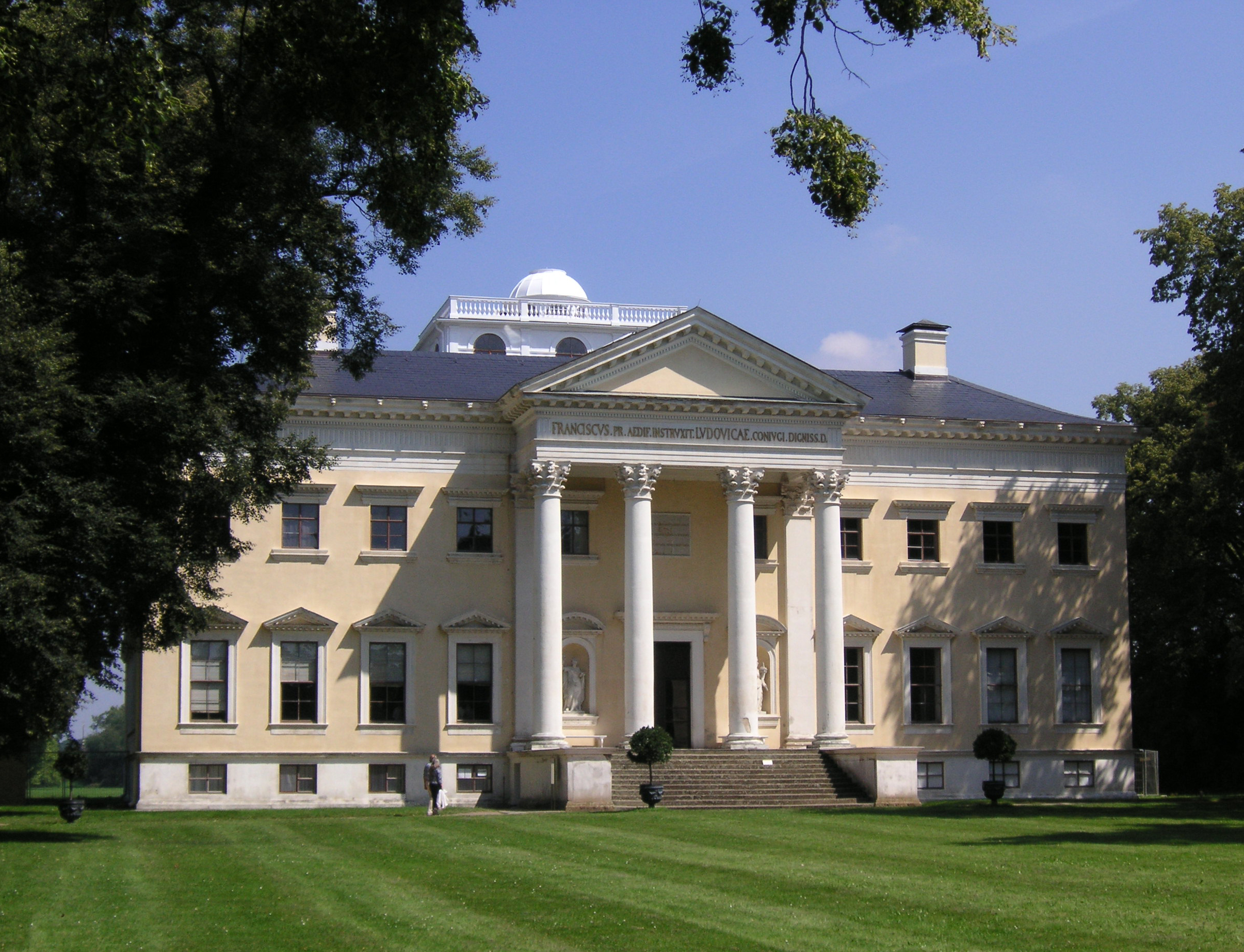
Wörlitz Palace in the Wörlitz Park, built from 1769 to 1773 by Leopold III Frederick Franz

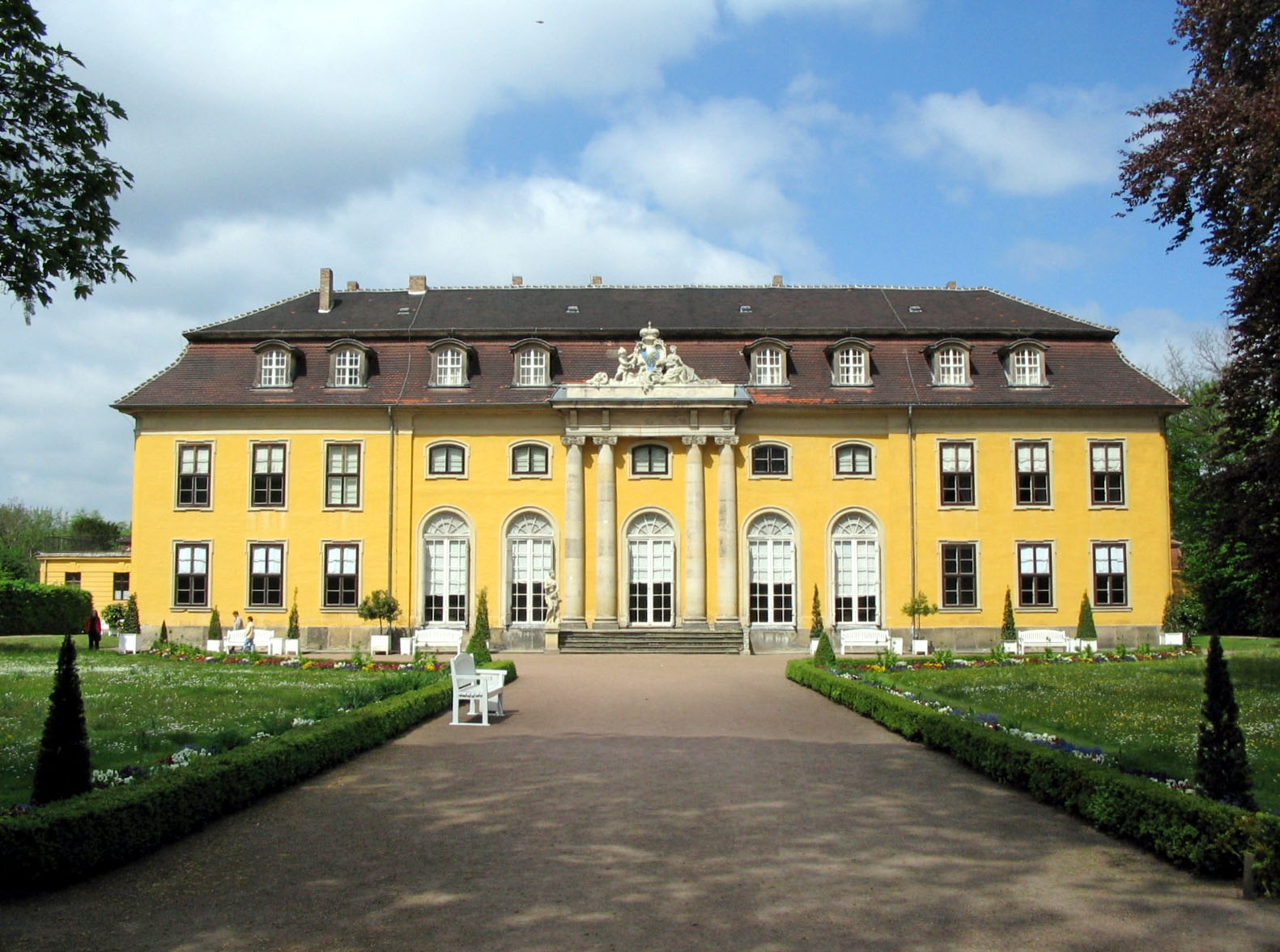
Mosigkau Palace, built 1752–57 for Princess Anna Wilhelmine

=== Anhalt-Plötzkau ===
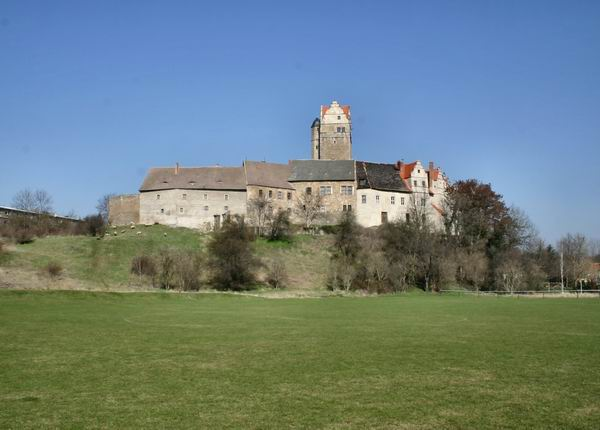
Plötzkau Castle

=== Anhalt-Harzgerode ===
Anhalt-Harzgerode emerged in 1635 from the division of Anhalt-Bernburg and reverted to it in 1709.

=== Duchy of Anhalt ===
The Duchy of Anhalt, adjacent to Prussia and Brunswick

The Zerbst line ceased in 1793, and its possessions passed to the other brothers in 1797. The Köthen line ended in 1847, and Köthen was unified with Dessau in 1853. When the Bernburg line became extinct in 1863, the Duchy of Anhalt was established under Duke Leopold IV Frederick († 1871). From this year, he held the title Duke of Anhalt, no longer Duke of Anhalt-Dessau.

In the federal resolution of June 14, 1866, the Duchy of Anhalt sided with Prussia, joined the North German Confederation in 1867, and the German Empire in 1871. The state parliament consisted of 36 deputies. The Duke appointed 2 deputies, 8 represented the highest-taxed landowners, 2 the highest-taxed merchants and industrialists, 14 represented the cities, and 10 represented rural areas.

The Duchy existed until the November Revolution in 1918, when workers and soldiers in Anhalt demonstrated and demanded change, which occurred peacefully. The Social Democrats called for the abdication of the ducal family. Prince Regent Aribert of Anhalt declared the abdication of the Ascanians on November 12, 1918, on behalf of the minor Duke Joachim Ernst.

On December 30, 1918, Aribert of Anhalt established the Joachim-Ernst Foundation, renamed the Dessau-Wörlitz Cultural Foundation in 1947. The foundation manages most of the Dessau-Wörlitz Garden Realm with several landscape parks.

==== State Ministers or Chairmen of the State Ministry ====
- 1863–1868 Karl Friedrich Ferdinand Sintenis (* 1804; † 1868)
- 1868–1875 Alfred von Larisch (* 1819; † 1897)
- 1875–1892 Anton von Krosigk (* 1820; † 1892)
- 1892–1903 Kurt von Koseritz (* 1838; † 1916)
- 1903–1909 Johann (Hans) Nikolaus Michael Louis von Dallwitz (* 1855; † 1919)
- 1910–1918 Eduard Hermann Ernst von Laue (* 1855; † 1923)
- 1918 Max Gutknecht (* 1876; † 1935)

== Rule Outside of Anhalt ==
The Anhalters also ruled outside their ancestral lands. At the beginning of the family history, the Ascanians were significant in the Margraviate of Brandenburg and the Duchy of Saxony.

=== Margraviate of Brandenburg ===
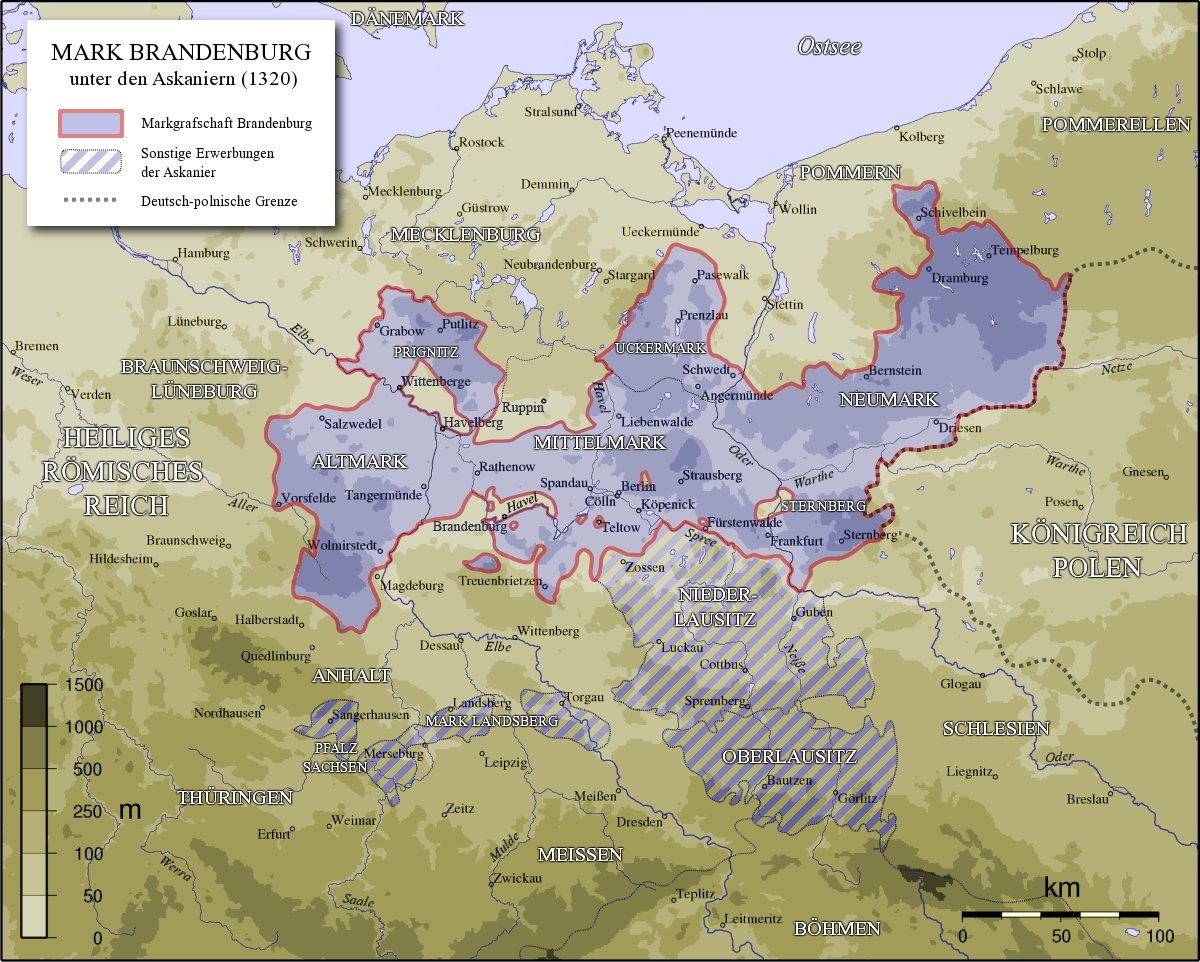
Brandenburg around 1320

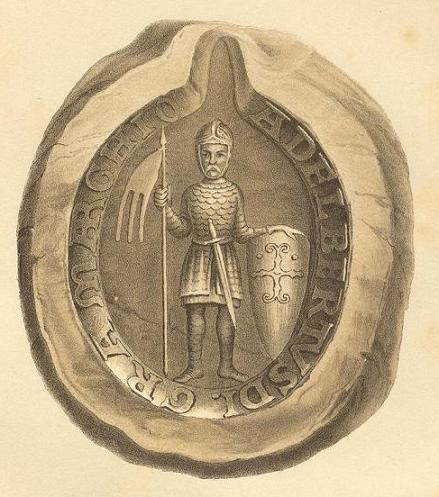
Albrecht the Bear on a seal with the inscription Adelbertus D(e)i gr(ati)a marchio (in Brandenborch)

The noble family shaped the history of Brandenburg, as it is credited with the Formation of the Margraviate of Brandenburg. When the Slavic prince Pribislav died in 1150, his widow Petrissa handed over the land of the Hevelli around Brandenburg Castle to Albrecht the Bear, Count of Ballenstedt. In 1157, Albrecht definitively took possession of Brandenburg. He participated in Lothair of Supplinburg's Italian campaign in 1132/1133, where Lothair was crowned emperor by Pope Innocent II. In gratitude, Albrecht received the Nordmark, which later gave him power over the Margraviate of Brandenburg. Despite Albrecht's rule over the Margraviate of Brandenburg, only three visits by the margrave (1150, 1157, and 1170) have been documented in the mark. Otto I. († 1184) became the new Margrave of Brandenburg in 1170, and his descendants expanded the territory through an expansionist eastern policy. In connection with the Ascanians, a founding myth also emerged.

At the beginning of the 14th century, the mark extended to the later Prussian Province of Brandenburg and even into Pomerania. With Henry II the Child, the Brandenburg line became extinct in 1320. Emperor Louis IV of the House of Wittelsbach, an uncle of Henry II, reclaimed Brandenburg as a lapsed fief and granted it to his son Louis V in 1323, concluding the Brandenburg Interregnum. In 1348, a pretender known as the False Waldemar was enfeoffed with the Margraviate of Brandenburg.

=== Duchy of Saxony ===
The old Duchy of Saxony was transferred to Henry the Lion of the House of Welf in 1143. It was divided into the three provinces of Westphalia, Angria, and Eastphalia and lay mostly in the area of present-day Lower Saxony, Westphalia, and the western part of Saxony-Anhalt. The Ascanians briefly held the title of Duke of Saxony with Otto the Rich in 1112 and Albrecht the Bear from 1138 to 1142. Albrecht's mother, Eilika of Saxony, was the daughter of the Saxon Duke Magnus Billung of Saxony. This fact supported a claim to Saxony, just as the Welfs could present their own arguments. Thus, the family can also be considered a Saxon noble house.

The title of Duke of Saxony passed in 1180, after the deposition of Henry the Lion at the Diet of Gelnhausen, documented in the Gelnhausen Charter of April 13, 1180, to Bernhard III. of Saxony, the youngest son of Albrecht the Bear. However, he received only the eastern part, excluding Westphalia and Angria, which went to the Archbishop of Cologne Philipp I. von Heinsberg. Bernhard also held the counties of Aschersleben and Ballenstedt as well as Anhalt Castle, the ancestral lands. In the retained eastern part of the Duchy, he could only exercise actual power in parts of it. Bernhard divided his territories among his sons: the elder son Albert I. († 1261) received the Saxon Duchy, while the younger son Henry I. († 1252) received the Anhalt ancestral lands.

Albert II., son of Albert I, and the sons of his brother John I. conducted a division of the Ascanian Duchy of Saxony in 1296. Saxony-Wittenberg went to Albrecht II, and John II., Albrecht III, and Eric I. received Saxony-Lauenburg. The Saxony-Wittenberg line was significant, receiving the hereditary electoral dignity in 1356 through the Golden Bull. However, it became extinct in 1422, and Saxony-Wittenberg ("Electoral Saxony") was granted to the Wettins, causing the Ascanians to lose their status as electors.

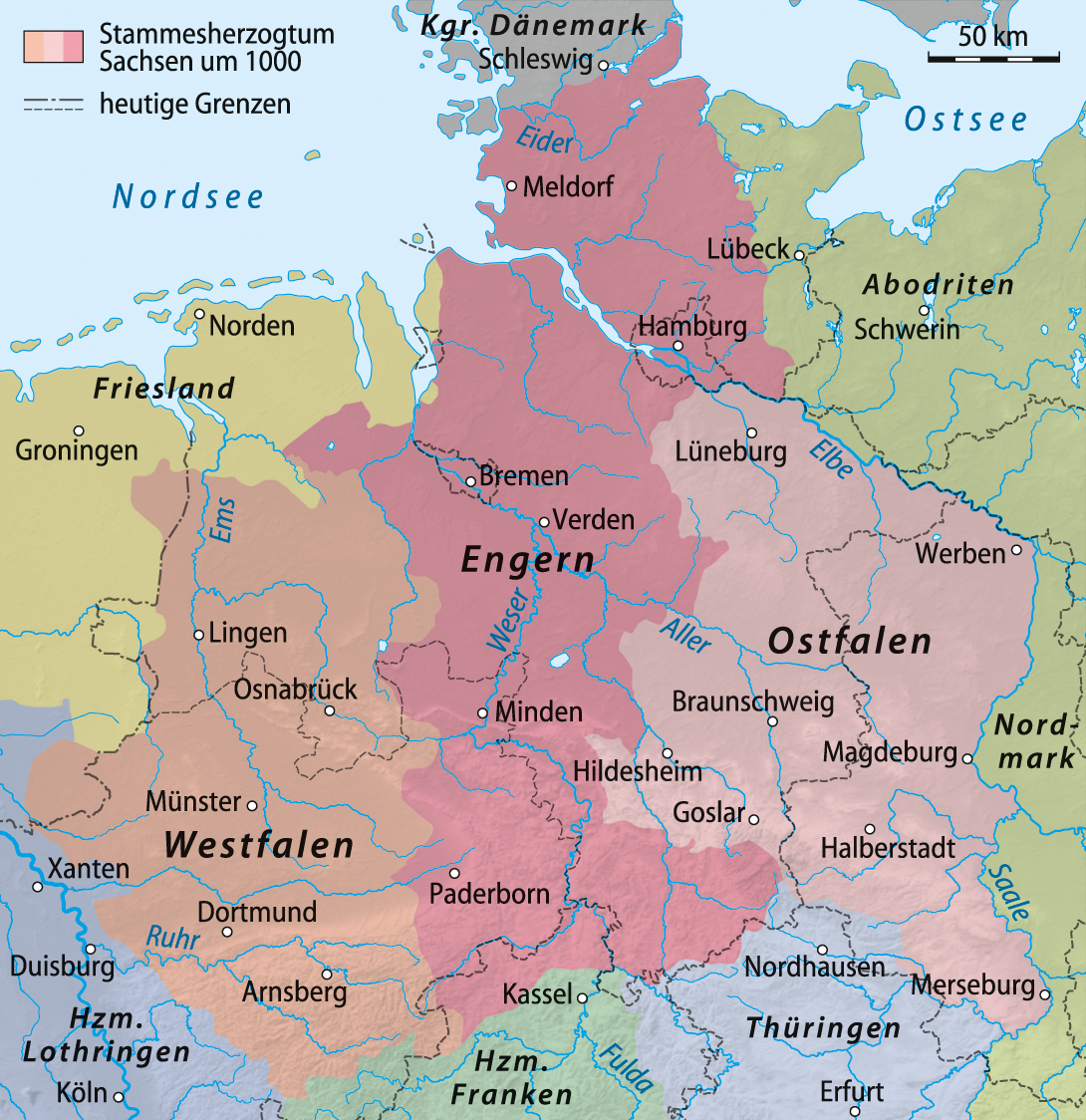
The Duchy of Saxony around the year 1000.

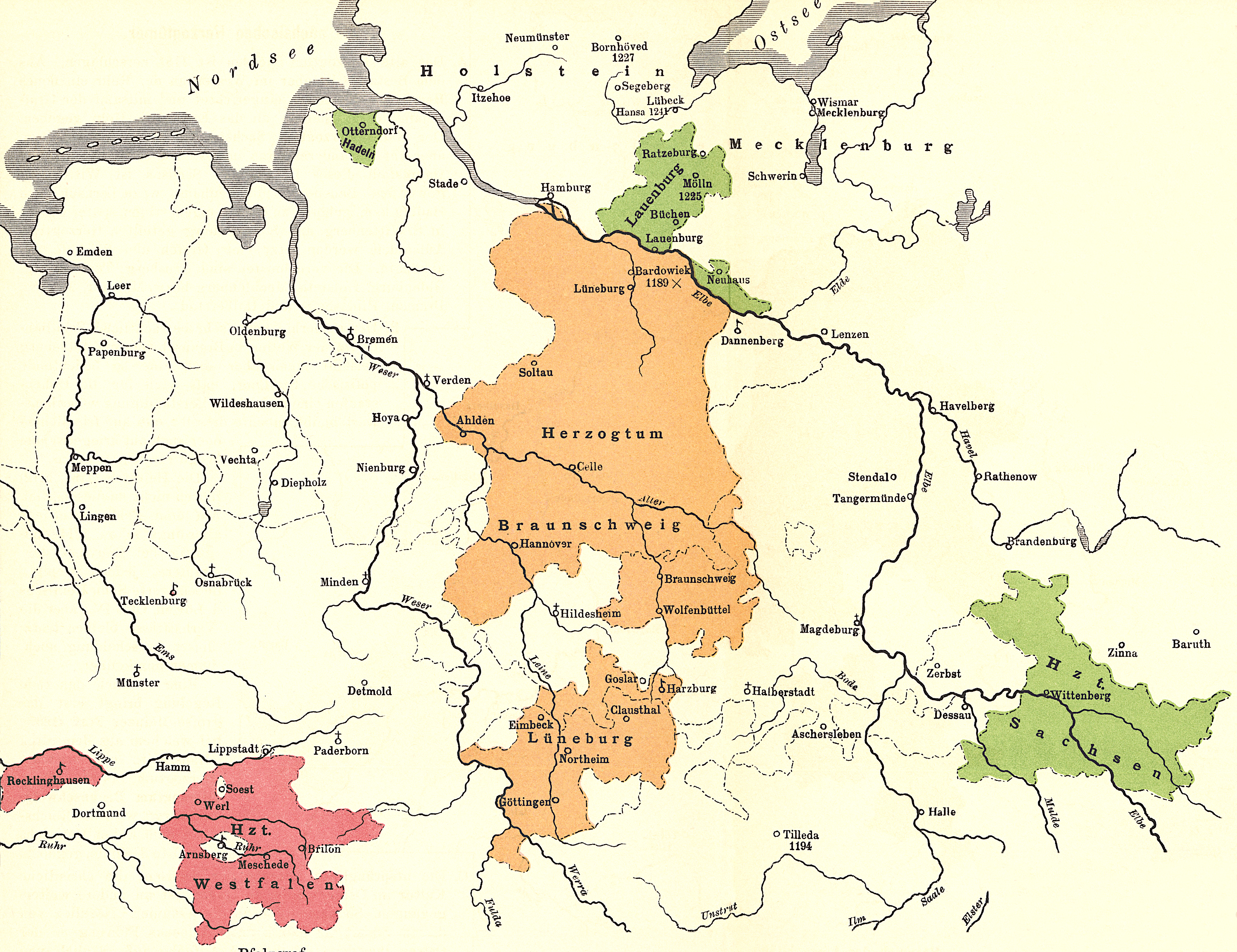
Territory of the Ascanian Duchy of Saxony around 1235 (highlighted in green), consisting of parts of the former Duchy of Saxony around Wittenberg and at Lauenburg and the Hadeln area

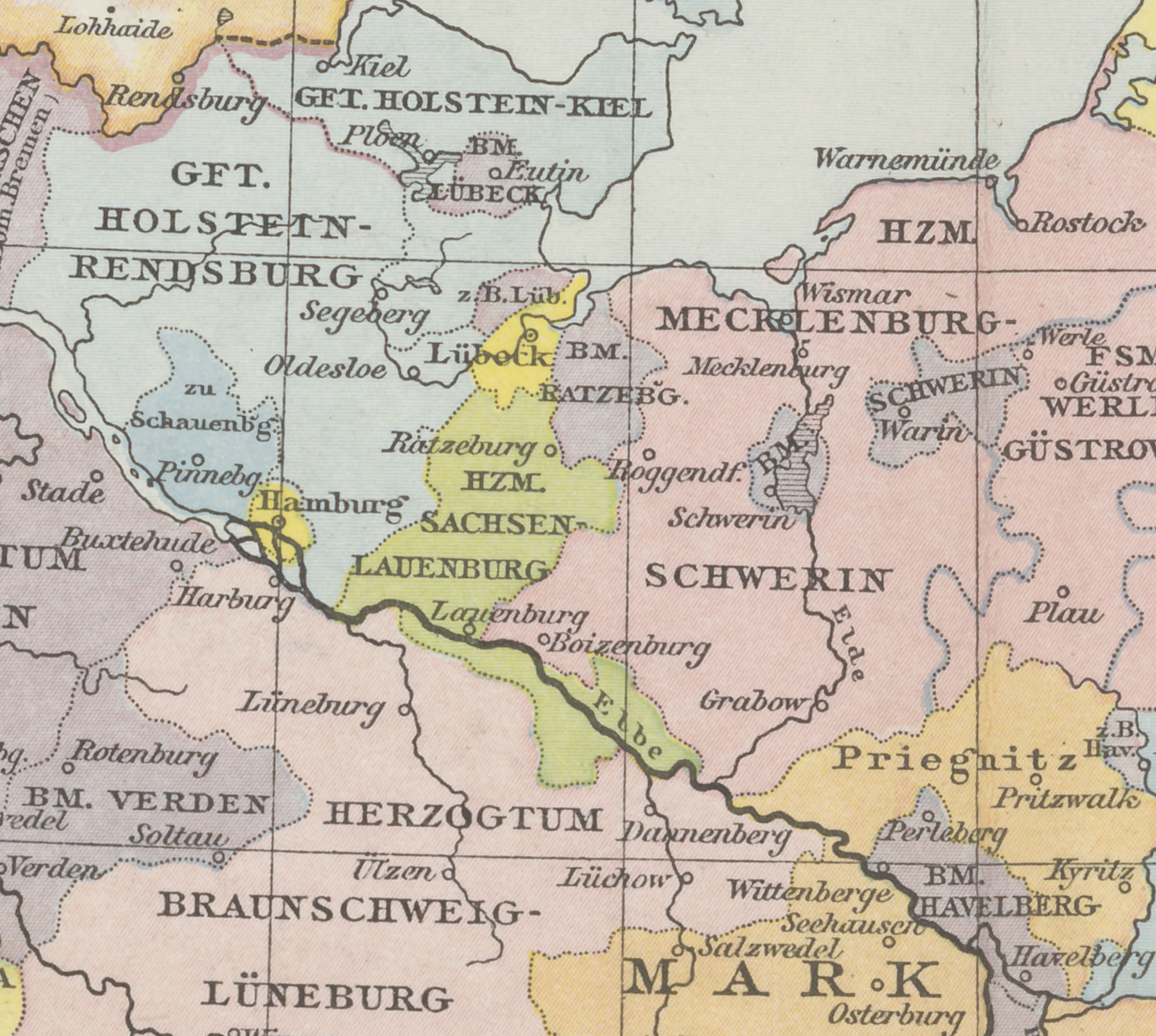
The Duchy of Saxe-Lauenburg around 1400.

==== Saxony-Lauenburg ====
The branch of John II., Duke of Saxe-Lauenburg in Bergedorf, now near Hamburg, and Mölln, ended in 1401 with his grandson Eric III.. Eric IV. received his lands, being Duke of Saxe-Lauenburg in Lauenburg and Ratzeburg. He thus held all the possessions and was a descendant of Eric I., who was Duke of Saxe-Lauenburg in Lauenburg and, after his brother Albrecht III's death in 1308, also in Ratzeburg. The Saxe-Lauenburg line ended with Julius Francis in 1689. The Welfs (from the neighboring Principality of Lüneburg line) succeeded them.

=== Weimar-Orlamünde ===
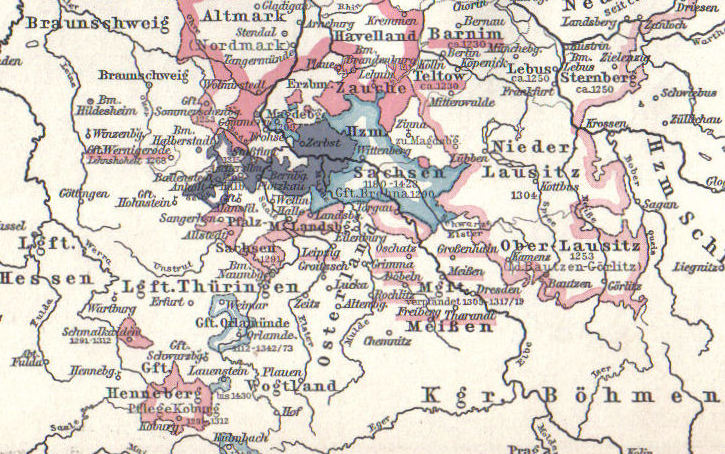
County of Orlamünde (approximate borders)

Siegfried I became the first Ascanian Count of Weimar-Orlamünde in 1112 after Ulrich II, Margrave of Carniola from the Weimar-Orlamünde house. He was the son of Adalbert II of Ballenstedt and his wife Adelaide, a daughter of Otto I, Margrave of Meissen . Albert I the Bear received the County of Weimar-Orlamünde in 1140. Hermann I († 1176) continued the Weimar-Orlamünde line. Following the inheritance division of 1264/65, Hermann III received the area around Orlamünde, and Otto III received the area around Weimar.

Orlamünde was sold to the Wettins on April 25, 1344. By 1467, the Ascanians no longer held any possessions, as the Wettins took over everything.

=== Principality of Lüneburg ===
After the older House of Lüneburg died out with William II of Brunswick-Lüneburg in 1369, the Lüneburg War of Succession began in 1370. In the same year, the Principality of Lüneburg was granted to Albrecht and Wenceslaus I of the Saxony-Wittemberg line by decree of Emperor Charles IV. Albrecht was the maternal grandson of William II of Brunswick-Lüneburg, while Wenceslaus I was Albrecht's uncle. The Ascanians were replaced in 1388 by Albrecht's stepsons from the House of Welf.

The rulers of the Principality of Lüneburg

- 1370–1385: Albrecht († 1385), son of Otto of Saxony-Wittenberg, ruled together with Wenzel I.
- 1370–1388: Wenceslaus I (* 1337; † 1388), son of Rudolf I of Saxony-Wittenberg, also Elector

== Rulers of the House of Ascania ==
=== House of Ascania ===
Partitions of the House of Ascania

County of Weimar-Orlamunde (1113–1247)			County of Ballenstedt (1030–1170)
County of Weimar-Orlamunde (1113–1247)			Duchy of Saxony (1180–1296)			Margraviate of Brandenburg (1157-1266/67)		County of Anhalt (1123–1212); Raised to: Principality of Anhalt (1212–1252)
County of Weimar (1247–1372)		County of Orlamunde (from 1354 in Schauenforst and Droyssig) (1247–1420)	Duchy of Saxony (1180–1296)			Margraviate of Brandenburg (1157-1266/67)		Principality of Zerbst (1st creation) (1252–1396)				Principality of Bernburg (1st creation) (1252–1468)	Principality of Aschersleben (1252–1315)
County of Weimar (1247–1372)		County of Orlamunde (from 1354 in Schauenforst and Droyssig) (1247–1420)	Duchy of Saxony (1180–1296)			Margraviate of Stendal (1266–1318)	Margraviate of Salzwedel (1267–1317)	Principality of Zerbst (1st creation) (1252–1396)				Principality of Bernburg (1st creation) (1252–1468)	Principality of Aschersleben (1252–1315)
County of Plassenburg (1285–1340)		County of Orlamunde (from 1354 in Schauenforst and Droyssig) (1247–1420)	Duchy of Wittenberg (1296–1356) Raised to: Electorate of Saxe-Wittenberg (1356–1422)	Duchy of Lauenburg (1296–1303)		Margraviate of Stendal (1266–1318)	Margraviate of Salzwedel (1267–1317)	Principality of Zerbst (1st creation) (1252–1396)				Principality of Bernburg (1st creation) (1252–1468)	Principality of Aschersleben (1252–1315)
County of Plassenburg (1285–1340)	County of Lauenstein (1319–1460)	County of Orlamunde (from 1354 in Schauenforst and Droyssig) (1247–1420)	Duchy of Wittenberg (1296–1356) Raised to: Electorate of Saxe-Wittenberg (1356–1422)	Duchy of Mölln (1303–1401)	Duchy of Ratzeburg (1303–15)	Margraviate of Brandenburg (Stendal line) (1318–20)		Principality of Zerbst (1st creation) (1252–1396)				Principality of Bernburg (1st creation) (1252–1468)	Principality of Aschersleben (1252–1315)
County of Plassenburg (1285–1340)	County of Lauenstein (1319–1460)	County of Orlamunde (from 1354 in Schauenforst and Droyssig) (1247–1420)	Duchy of Wittenberg (1296–1356) Raised to: Electorate of Saxe-Wittenberg (1356–1422)	Duchy of Mölln (1303–1401)	Duchy of Bergdorf (1303–15); Renamed as Duchy of Ratzeburg (1315–1401)	Annexed to the House of Wittelsbach		Principality of Zerbst (1st creation) (1252–1396)				Principality of Bernburg (1st creation) (1252–1468)	Annexed to Bishopric of Halberstadt
Annexed to the House of Wettin	County of Lauenstein (1319–1460)	County of Orlamunde (from 1354 in Schauenforst and Droyssig) (1247–1420)	Duchy of Wittenberg (1296–1356) Raised to: Electorate of Saxe-Wittenberg (1356–1422)	Duchy of Mölln (1303–1401)	Duchy of Bergdorf (1303–15); Renamed as Duchy of Ratzeburg (1315–1401)	Annexed to the House of Wittelsbach		Principality of Zerbst (1st creation) (1252–1396)				Principality of Bernburg (1st creation) (1252–1468)	Annexed to Bishopric of Halberstadt
Annexed to the House of Wettin	County of Lauenstein (1319–1460)	County of Orlamunde (from 1354 in Schauenforst and Droyssig) (1247–1420)	Duchy of Wittenberg (1296–1356) Raised to: Electorate of Saxe-Wittenberg (1356–1422)	Duchy of Lauenburg (Ratzeburg line) (1401–1689)		Annexed to the House of Wittelsbach		Principality of Köthen (1st creation) (1396–1562)				Principality of Bernburg (1st creation) (1252–1468)	Annexed to Bishopric of Halberstadt
Annexed to the House of Wettin	Annexed to the House of Wettin			Duchy of Lauenburg (Ratzeburg line) (1401–1689)		Annexed to the House of Wittelsbach		Principality of Köthen (1st creation) (1396–1562)					Annexed to Bishopric of Halberstadt
Annexed to the House of Wettin	Annexed to the House of Wettin			Duchy of Lauenburg (Ratzeburg line) (1401–1689)		Annexed to the House of Wittelsbach		Principality of Köthen (1st creation) (1396–1562)			Principality of Dessau (1st creation) (1396–1561)	Principality of Zerbst (2nd creation) (1544–1562)	Annexed to Bishopric of Halberstadt
Annexed to the House of Wettin	Annexed to the House of Wettin			Duchy of Lauenburg (Ratzeburg line) (1401–1689)		Annexed to the House of Wittelsbach		Principality of Anhalt (Zerbst line) (1562–1603)					Annexed to Bishopric of Halberstadt
Annexed to the House of Wettin	Annexed to the House of Wettin			Duchy of Lauenburg (Ratzeburg line) (1401–1689)		Annexed to the House of Wittelsbach		Principality of Plötzkau (1603–1665)	Principality of Köthen (2nd creation) (1603–1847)	Principality of Dessau (2nd creation) (1603–1863)	Principality of Zerbst (3rd creation) (1603–1793)	Principality of Bernburg (2nd creation) (1603–1863)	Annexed to Bishopric of Halberstadt
Annexed to the House of Wettin	Annexed to the House of Wettin			Annexed to the House of Welf		Annexed to the House of Wittelsbach				Principality of Dessau (2nd creation) (1603–1863)	Principality of Zerbst (3rd creation) (1603–1793)	Principality of Bernburg (2nd creation) (1603–1863)	Annexed to Bishopric of Halberstadt
Annexed to the House of Wettin	Annexed to the House of Wettin			Annexed to the House of Welf		Annexed to the House of Wittelsbach		Duchy of Anhalt (Dessau line) (1863–1918)					Annexed to Bishopric of Halberstadt

Table of rulers

Ruler	Born	Reign	Ruling part	Consort	Death	Notes
Adalbert I	c.970 ?	c.1000–1036	County of Ballenstedt	Hidda four children	1036 aged 65–66	First documented member of the family.
Esico	c.1000 Son of Adalbert I and Hidda	1036–1060	County of Ballenstedt	Matilda of Swabia; 1026 three children	1060 aged 59–60	
Adalbert II	c.1030 Ballenstedt; Son of Esico and Matilda of Swabia	1060–1080	County of Ballenstedt	Adelaide of Weimar-Orlamünde c.1070 two children	c.1080 Westdorf aged c.49-50	
Otto I the Rich	c.1065 First son of Adalbert II and Adelaide of Weimar-Orlamünde	1080 – 9 February 1123	County of Ballenstedt	Eilika of Saxony c.1095 two children	9 February 1123 aged 57–58?	Children of Adalbert II, divided their inheritance.
Siegfried I	c.1070 Second son of Adalbert II and Adelaide of Weimar-Orlamünde	1080 – 9 March 1113	County of Weimar-Orlamünde	Gertrude of Northeim; 1026 three children	9 March 1113 aged 42–43?	Children of Adalbert II, divided their inheritance.
Regencies of Gertrude of Northeim (1113–1115) and Otto I, Count of Salm (1115–1121)						Left no descendants. The county went to his brother.
Siegfried II	1107; First son of Siegfried I and Gertrude of Northeim	9 March 1113 – 19 March 1124	County of Weimar-Orlamünde	Irmgard of Henneberg no children	19 March 1124 aged 16–17	Left no descendants. The county went to his brother.
Albert I the Bear	c.1100 Son of Otto I and Eilika of Saxony	9 February 1123 – 18 November 1170	County of Ballenstedt (with Brandenburg from 1157)	Sophie of Winzenburg; 1124 thirteen children	18 November 1170; Stendal (possibly) aged 69–70	Besides count of Ballenstedt, he was also the first Margrave of Brandenburg (1157). Ruler of the Northern March from 1134, and the county of Weimar-Orlamünde since 1140.
Regency of Otto I, Count of Salm (1124-1126)						Also ascended as a minor Left no descendants. The county went to his cousin, Albert the Bear, from Ballenstedt.
William	1112; Worms; Second son of Siegfried I and Gertrude of Northeim	19 March 1124 – 13 February 1140	County of Weimar-Orlamünde	Adelaide no children	13 February 1140; Cochem aged 27–28	Also ascended as a minor Left no descendants. The county went to his cousin, Albert the Bear, from Ballenstedt.
Weimar-Orlamünde briefly annexed to Ballenstedt (1140-70)
Otto I	1128; First son of Albert I and Sophie of Winzenburg	18 November 1170 – 8 July 1184	Margraviate of Brandenburg	Judith of Poland; 1148 two children Ada of Holland; 1175 one child	8 July 1184 aged 55–56	Children of Albert I, divided their inheritance. After Adalbert and Dietrich's childless deaths, their possessions were inherited by the younger brother, Bernard.
Herman I	1130; Second son of Albert I and Sophie of Winzenburg	18 November 1170 – 19 October 1176	County of Weimar-Orlamünde	Irmgard two children	19 October 1176 aged 45–46	Children of Albert I, divided their inheritance. After Adalbert and Dietrich's childless deaths, their possessions were inherited by the younger brother, Bernard.
Adalbert (III)	1136; Fourth son of Albert I and Sophie of Winzenburg	18 November 1170 – 1171	County of Ballenstedt (at Aschersleben)	Unmarried	1171 aged 34–35	Children of Albert I, divided their inheritance. After Adalbert and Dietrich's childless deaths, their possessions were inherited by the younger brother, Bernard.
Theodoric	1137; Fifth son of Albert I and Sophie of Winzenburg	18 November 1170 – 1183	County of Ballenstedt (at Burgwerben)	Unmarried	1183 aged 45–46	Children of Albert I, divided their inheritance. After Adalbert and Dietrich's childless deaths, their possessions were inherited by the younger brother, Bernard.
Bernard (I)	1140; Sixth son of Albert I and Sophie of Winzenburg	18 November 1170 – 2 February 1212	County of Anhalt (with Ballenstedt and Saxony)	Brigitte of Denmark one child Judith of Greater Poland c.1173 five children Sophia of Thuringia one child	2 February 1212; Bernburg aged 71–72	Children of Albert I, divided their inheritance. After Adalbert and Dietrich's childless deaths, their possessions were inherited by the younger brother, Bernard.
Aschersleben and Burgwerben annexed to Anhalt
Siegfried III	1155; Son of Herman I and Irmgard	19 October 1176 – 1206	County of Weimar-Orlamünde	Sophia of Denmark c.1180 three children	1206 aged 50–51	
Otto II the Generous	c.1150 First son of Otto I and Judith of Poland	8 July 1184 – 4 July 1205	Margraviate of Brandenburg	Unmarried	4 July 1205 aged 54–55	Elder children of Otto I, both left no descendants. The patrimony was inherited by their half-brother, Albert II.
Henry	c.1150? Second son of Otto I and Judith of Poland	8 July 1184 – 1192	Margraviate of Brandenburg (at Gardelegen)	Unmarried	1192 aged 41–42?	Elder children of Otto I, both left no descendants. The patrimony was inherited by their half-brother, Albert II.
Albert II	1177; Son of Otto I and Ada of Holland	4 July 1205 – 25 February 1220	Margraviate of Brandenburg	Matilda of Lusatia; 1205 four children	25 February 1220 aged 42–43	
Albert II	1182; First son of Siegfried III and Sophia of Denmark	1206 – 22 October 1245	County of Weimar-Orlamünde (at Nordhalben)	Unmarried	22 October 1245 aged 62–63	Children of Siegfried III, divided their inheritance, which was soon reunited by Herman II.
Herman II	1184; Second son of Siegfried III and Sophia of Denmark	1206 – 27 December 1247	County of Weimar-Orlamünde (at Orlamünde)	Beatrix of Andechs-Merania c.1230 six children	27 December 1247 aged 62–63	Children of Siegfried III, divided their inheritance, which was soon reunited by Herman II.
Otto II	c.1185 Third son of Siegfried III and Sophia of Denmark	1206–1211	County of Weimar-Orlamünde (at Weimar)	Unmarried	1211 aged 25–26	Children of Siegfried III, divided their inheritance, which was soon reunited by Herman II.
Nordhalben and Weimar rejoined Orlamünde
Henry I	c.1173 First son of Bernard (I) and Judith of Greater Poland	2 February 1212 – 1252	County of Anhalt (until 1218) Principality of Anhalt (from 1218)	Irmgard of Thuringia; 1211 eleven children	1252 aged 78–79	Children of Bernard, divided their inheritance. In 1218 Henry becomes Prince of Anhalt, which after his death is divided by his sons.
Albert I	c.1175 Second son of Bernard (I) and Judith of Greater Poland	2 February 1212 – 7 October 1260	Duchy of Saxony	Agnes of Austria; 1222 five children Agnes of Thuringia; 1238 three children Helene of Brunswick-Lüneburg; 1247 five children	7 October 1260 aged 84–85	Children of Bernard, divided their inheritance. In 1218 Henry becomes Prince of Anhalt, which after his death is divided by his sons.
Regencies of Henry I, Count of Anhalt (1220–1225), Albert I, Archbishop of Magdeburg (1220–1221) and Matilda of Lusatia (1221–1225)						Children of Albert II, ruled jointly, but their children divided the margraviate.
John I	1213; First son of Albert II and Matilda of Lusatia	25 February 1220 – 4 April 1266	Margraviate of Brandenburg	Sophia of Denmark; 1230 six children Judith of Saxony; 1255 four children	4 April 1266; Stendal aged 52–53	Children of Albert II, ruled jointly, but their children divided the margraviate.
Otto III the Pious	1215; Second son of Albert II and Matilda of Lusatia	25 February 1220 – 9 October 1267	Margraviate of Brandenburg	Beatrice of Bohemia; 1243 six children	9 October 1267; Brandenburg an der Havel aged 51–52	Children of Albert II, ruled jointly, but their children divided the margraviate.
Herman III the Popular	c.1230 Second son of Herman II and Beatrix of Andechs-Merania	27 December 1247 – 1283	County of Orlamünde	Unknown four children	1283 aged 52–23	Children of Herman II, divided their inheritance.
Otto III the Magnificent	1236; Third son of Herman II and Beatrix of Andechs-Merania	27 December 1247 – 13 May 1285	County of Weimar	Agnes of Leiningen (c. 1230/40-13 May 1285); 1266 four children	13 May 1285 aged 48–49	Children of Herman II, divided their inheritance.
Albert III	c.1240 Fourth son of Herman II and Beatrix of Andechs-Merania	27 December 1247 – 1283	County of Weimar	Unmarried	1283 aged 42–43	Children of Herman II, divided their inheritance.
Sophia	c.1240 Daughter of Herman II and Beatrix of Andechs-Merania	27 December 1247 – 1270	County of Weimar-Orlamünde (at Regnitzland)	Henry VIII Reuss, Lord of Weida; 19 July 1258 three children	c.1270 aged 29–30	Children of Herman II, divided their inheritance.
Henry II the Fat	1215; First son of Henry I and Irmgard of Thuringia	1252 – 12 June 1266	Principality of Aschersleben	Matilda of Brunswick-Lüneburg; 1245 two children	12 June 1266 aged 50–51	Children of Henry I, divided their inheritance.
Bernard I	1218; Second son of Henry I and Irmgard of Thuringia	1252–1287	Principality of Bernburg	Sophia of Denmark; 3 February 1258; Hamburg six children	1287 aged 68–69	Children of Henry I, divided their inheritance.
Siegfried I	1230; Seventh son of Henry I and Irmgard of Thuringia	1252 – 25 March 1298	Principality of Zerbst	Catherine of Sweden; 17 October 1259 ten children	25 March 1298; Köthen aged 67–68	Children of Henry I, divided their inheritance.
John I	1249; Wittenberg; First son of Albert I and Helene of Brunswick-Lüneburg	7 October 1260 – 1282	Duchy of Saxony (Since 1296 in Saxe-Wittenberg)	Ingeborg Birgersdotter of Sweden; 1270 eight children	30 July 1285; Wittenberg aged 35–36	Ruled jointly; and associated his nephews to the joint rulership after his brothers death. However, these three nephews divided the land with him. Albert II retained Saxe-Wittenberg, and became the head of the Elder Saxon Line; Albert III, Eric I and John II ruled together in Saxe-Lauenburg, becoming the founders of the Younger Saxon Line.
Albert II	1250; Wittenberg; Second son of Albert I and Helene of Brunswick-Lüneburg	7 October 1260 – 25 August 1298	Duchy of Saxony (Since 1296 in Saxe-Wittenberg)	Agnes-Gertrude of Austria; 1282 six children	25 August 1298; Aken aged 35–36	Ruled jointly; and associated his nephews to the joint rulership after his brothers death. However, these three nephews divided the land with him. Albert II retained Saxe-Wittenberg, and became the head of the Elder Saxon Line; Albert III, Eric I and John II ruled together in Saxe-Lauenburg, becoming the founders of the Younger Saxon Line.
In 1296 Albert II and his nephews (Albert III, Eric I, and John II) ended their joint rule and divided Saxony into the Lauenburg line, where Albert III, Eric I, and John II continued to rule jointly until 1303, and the Wittenberg line, where Albert II continued as sole ruler until 1298. Since the Duke of Saxony was considered one of the prince-electors electing a new Holy Roman Emperor, conflict arose between the lines of Lauenburg and Wittenberg over the issue of who should cast Saxony's vote. In 1314 both lines found themselves on different sides in a double election. Eventually, the Dukes of Saxe-Wittenberg succeeded in 1356 after the promulgation of the Golden Bull. To distinguish him from other rulers bearing the title Duke of Saxony, he was commonly called Elector of Saxony.
Regency of Matilda of Brunswick-Lüneburg (1266–1270)						Children of Henry II, ruled jointly, first under their mother, who was elected Abbess of Gernrode in 1275. In 1283, Henry renounced his rights in Otto's favor, and later became Archbishop of Magdeburg.
Otto I	c.1245 First son of Henry II and Matilda of Brunswick-Lüneburg	12 June 1266 – 25 June 1304	Principality of Aschersleben	Hedwig of Wrocław; 1283 three children	25 June 1304 aged 58–59	Children of Henry II, ruled jointly, first under their mother, who was elected Abbess of Gernrode in 1275. In 1283, Henry renounced his rights in Otto's favor, and later became Archbishop of Magdeburg.
Henry III	c.1245 Second son of Henry II and Matilda of Brunswick-Lüneburg	12 June 1266 – 1283	Principality of Aschersleben	Unmarried	9 November 1307 aged 61–62	Children of Henry II, ruled jointly, first under their mother, who was elected Abbess of Gernrode in 1275. In 1283, Henry renounced his rights in Otto's favor, and later became Archbishop of Magdeburg.
John II	1237; First son of John I and Sophia of Denmark	9 October 1267 – 10 September 1281	Margraviate of Stendal (at Krossen)	Hedwig of Werle (1243–1287); 1249 two children	10 September 1281 aged 43–44	Children of John I. Despite co-rulership between them, they received different parts in the Margraviate to rule (alone or in co-rulership): John II received seat at Krossen; Otto IV received seat at Stendal; Conrad received seat at Neumark, and associated his sons in 1291.
Otto IV of the Arrow	1238; Second son of John I and Sophia of Denmark	9 October 1267 – 27 November 1308	Margraviate of Stendal (at Stendal)	Heilwig of Holstein-Kiel (d.1305); 1279 no children Judith of Henneberg-Schleusingen (d.1315); 1308 no children	27 November 1308 aged 69–70	Children of John I. Despite co-rulership between them, they received different parts in the Margraviate to rule (alone or in co-rulership): John II received seat at Krossen; Otto IV received seat at Stendal; Conrad received seat at Neumark, and associated his sons in 1291.
Conrad I	1240; Third son of John I and Sophia of Denmark	9 October 1267 – 1304	Margraviate of Stendal (at Neumark)	Constance of Greater Poland; 1260; Santok three children	1304; Chorin aged 63–64	Children of John I. Despite co-rulership between them, they received different parts in the Margraviate to rule (alone or in co-rulership): John II received seat at Krossen; Otto IV received seat at Stendal; Conrad received seat at Neumark, and associated his sons in 1291.
Otto VII	c.1265 Second son of Conrad I and Constance of Greater Poland	1291–1297	Margraviate of Stendal (at Neumark)	Unmarried	1297 aged 31–32	Children of John I. Despite co-rulership between them, they received different parts in the Margraviate to rule (alone or in co-rulership): John II received seat at Krossen; Otto IV received seat at Stendal; Conrad received seat at Neumark, and associated his sons in 1291.
John III of Prague	6 April 1244; Prague; First son of Otto III and Beatrice of Bohemia	9 October 1267 – 8 April 1268	Margraviate of Salzwedel (at Salzwedel)	Unmarried	8 April 1268; Merseburg aged 24	Children of Otto III. Despite co-rulership between them, they received different parts in the Margraviate to rule (alone or in co-rulership): John III (and then Otto V with Otto VI) received the seat at Salzwedel, from which Otto VI abdicated in 1286; Albert III received a seat in Stargard (which he ruled alone at least from 1284.
Otto V the Tall	1246; Prague; Second son of Otto III and Beatrice of Bohemia	9 October 1267 – July 1299	Margraviate of Salzwedel (at Salzwedel)	Judith of Henneberg-Coburg; 22 October 1268; Freiburg four children	July 1299 aged 52–53	Children of Otto III. Despite co-rulership between them, they received different parts in the Margraviate to rule (alone or in co-rulership): John III (and then Otto V with Otto VI) received the seat at Salzwedel, from which Otto VI abdicated in 1286; Albert III received a seat in Stargard (which he ruled alone at least from 1284.
Otto VI the Short	3/17 November 1264; Fourth son of Otto III and Beatrice of Bohemia	9 October 1267 – 1286	Margraviate of Salzwedel (at Salzwedel)	Hedwig of Austria; February 1279; Vienna no children	6 July 1303; Lehnin aged 38	Children of Otto III. Despite co-rulership between them, they received different parts in the Margraviate to rule (alone or in co-rulership): John III (and then Otto V with Otto VI) received the seat at Salzwedel, from which Otto VI abdicated in 1286; Albert III received a seat in Stargard (which he ruled alone at least from 1284.
Albert III	c.1250 Third son of Otto III and Beatrice of Bohemia	9 October 1267 – 1300	Margraviate of Salzwedel (at Stargard)	Matilda of Denmark; 1268 four children	1300 aged 49–50	Children of Otto III. Despite co-rulership between them, they received different parts in the Margraviate to rule (alone or in co-rulership): John III (and then Otto V with Otto VI) received the seat at Salzwedel, from which Otto VI abdicated in 1286; Albert III received a seat in Stargard (which he ruled alone at least from 1284.
Conrad II	1261; Son of John II and Hedwig of Werle	10 September 1281 – 1308	Margraviate of Stendal (at Krossen)	Unmarried	1308 aged 46–47	With his childless death his land reverted to Stendal.
Krossen re-annexed to Stendal
Henry I	c. 1270; First son of Herman III	1283 – 26 March 1354	County of Orlamünde	Irmgard of Schwarzburg-Blankenburg; 26 July 1313 two children	26 March 1354 aged 83–84?	Children of Herman III, divided their inheritance.
Herman V	c. 1270; Second son of Herman III	1283–1312	County of Orlamünde	Unmarried	1312 aged 41–42?	Children of Herman III, divided their inheritance.
Elisabeth (I) the Elder	1265; Daughter of Herman III	1283–1327	County of Orlamünde (at Nordhalben)	Hartmann XI, Count of Lobdeburg-Arnshaugk one child Albert II, Margrave of Meissen; 1 October 1290 no children	1327 aged 56–57	Children of Herman III, divided their inheritance.
Herman IV	c. 1270; First son of Otto III and Agnes of Leiningen	13 May 1285 – 1319	County of Weimar	Matilda of Rabenswald (d.1339); 24 November 1290 four children	1319 aged 48–49	Children of Otto III, divided their inheritance.
Otto IV the Younger	1279; Second son of Otto III and Agnes of Leiningen	13 May 1285 – 1318	County of Plassenburg	Adelaide of Kafernburg (d.c.1305); 14 December 1296 one child Catherine of Hesse (1286–1322); 1308 one child	1318 aged 38–39	Children of Otto III, divided their inheritance.
John I	1258; First son of Bernard I and Sophia of Denmark	1287 – 5 June 1291	Principality of Bernburg	Unmarried	5 June 1291 aged 32–33	Children of Bernard I, ruled jointly.
Bernard II	1260; Third son of Bernard I and Sophia of Denmark	1287 – 1323	Principality of Bernburg	Helena of Rügen; 27 December 1302 three children	1323 aged 62–63	Children of Bernard I, ruled jointly.
John II	1275; First son of John I and Ingeborg Birgersdotter of Sweden	20 September 1296 – 22 April 1322	Duchy of Mölln (in co-rulership in Lauenburg until 1303)	Elizabeth of Holstein-Rendsburg; 1315 one child	22 April 1322; Mölln aged 46–47	Children of John I, co-ruled first with their uncle Albert II since 1282 (since the death of their father), and in 1296 split the land with him. They retained Lauenburg, which they divided once more. Albert passed the land to his widow, and after her death, in 1315, the territory was realigned: Eric divided Bergdorf with his surviving brother and held all of his brother Albert's inheritance. However, he ended up abdicating to his son, and survived for most of his reign.
Eric I	1280; Second son of John I and Ingeborg Birgersdotter of Sweden	20 September 1296 – 1338	Duchy of Bergedorf (in co-rulership in Lauenburg until 1303; in Bergedorf 1303–1315) Duchy of Ratzeburg (from 1315)	Elisabeth of Pomerania; 1316 or 1318 four children	1360; Nienburg aged 79–80	Children of John I, co-ruled first with their uncle Albert II since 1282 (since the death of their father), and in 1296 split the land with him. They retained Lauenburg, which they divided once more. Albert passed the land to his widow, and after her death, in 1315, the territory was realigned: Eric divided Bergdorf with his surviving brother and held all of his brother Albert's inheritance. However, he ended up abdicating to his son, and survived for most of his reign.
Albert III	1281; Third son of John I and Ingeborg Birgersdotter of Sweden	20 September 1296 – 1308	Duchy of Ratzeburg (in co-rulership in Lauenburg until 1303)	Margaret of Brandenburg-Salzwedel; 1302 two children	1308 aged 26–27	Children of John I, co-ruled first with their uncle Albert II since 1282 (since the death of their father), and in 1296 split the land with him. They retained Lauenburg, which they divided once more. Albert passed the land to his widow, and after her death, in 1315, the territory was realigned: Eric divided Bergdorf with his surviving brother and held all of his brother Albert's inheritance. However, he ended up abdicating to his son, and survived for most of his reign.
Margaret of Brandenburg-Salzwedel	1270; Second daughter of Albert III, Margrave of Brandenburg-Salzwedel and Matilda of Denmark	1308 – 1 May 1315	Duchy of Ratzeburg	Przemysł II, King of Poland; 1302 two children Albert III; 1302 two children	1 May 1315; Ratzeburg aged 44–45	Children of John I, co-ruled first with their uncle Albert II since 1282 (since the death of their father), and in 1296 split the land with him. They retained Lauenburg, which they divided once more. Albert passed the land to his widow, and after her death, in 1315, the territory was realigned: Eric divided Bergdorf with his surviving brother and held all of his brother Albert's inheritance. However, he ended up abdicating to his son, and survived for most of his reign.
In 1315, after the death of Margaret of Brandenburg, the remaining brothers Eric and John redesigned the political division in Saxe-Lauenburg; Eric retained all of Margaret's part, but had to give part of his original domains to his brother.
Albert I	c.1260 Son of Siegfried I and Catherine of Sweden	25 March 1298 – 17 August 1316	Principality of Zerbst	Liutgard of Holstein-Itzehoe after 1277 two children Agnes of Brandenburg-Stendal; 1300 five children	17 August 1316 aged 55–56	
Rudolph I	1284; Wittenberg; Son of Albert II and Agnes-Gertrude of Austria	25 August 1298 – 10 January 1356 10 January 1356 – 12 March 1356	Duchy of Wittenberg (until 1356) Electorate of Saxony (from 1356)	Judith of Brandenburg-Salzwedel; 1298 eight children Kunigunde of Poland; 28 August 1328 one child Agnes of Lindow-Ruppin; 1333 three children	12 March 1356; Wittenberg aged 71–72	In January 1356 the Golden Bull confirmed Rudolf I as the legitimate Saxon Prince-Elector, thus the rulers of Saxe-Wittenberg are conceived as Electors of Saxony.
The Golden Bull of 1356 confirmed the right to participate in the election of a Holy Roman Emperor to the Duke of Saxony in the Saxe-Wittenberg line.
Herman the Tall	1275; Son of Otto V and Judith of Henneberg-Coburg	July 1299 – 1 February 1308	Margraviate of Salzwedel (at Salzwedel)	Anne of Austria; 1295; Graz four children	1 February 1308; Lübz aged 32–33	Children of Otto V, divided the land. Beatrice's part was then annexed to the Duchy of Świdnica-Jawor.
Beatrice (I)	1270; Daughter of Otto V and Judith of Henneberg-Coburg	July 1299 – 1316	Margraviate of Salzwedel (at Upper Lusatia)	Bolko I, Duke of Świdnica; 4 October 1284; Berlin ten children Władysław, Duke of Bytom; 21 September 1308 two children	1316 aged 45–46	Children of Otto V, divided the land. Beatrice's part was then annexed to the Duchy of Świdnica-Jawor.
Upper Lusatia annexed to the Duchy of Świdnica-Jawor
Beatrice (II)	c. 1270; First daughter of Albert III and Matilda of Denmark	1300 – 22 September 1314	Margraviate of Salzwedel (at Stargard)	Henry II, Lord of Mecklenburg; 1292; Stargard Castle four children	22 September 1314 aged 43–44	Daughter and heiress of Albert III. Her marriage transferred the Stargard region into the Duchy of Mecklenburg.
Stargard annexed to the Duchy of Mecklenburg
John IV	1261; First son of Conrad I and Constance of Greater Poland	1304–1305	Margraviate of Stendal (at Neumark)	Unmarried	1305 aged 43–44	Co-ruler of his father since 1291. His childless death reverted his lands to his younger brother Valdemar.
Otto II	c.1260 Son of Otto I and Hedwig of Wrocław	25 June 1304 – 24 July 1315	Principality of Aschersleben	Elisabeth of Meissen; 24 August 1309 two children	24 July 1315 aged 54–55	After his death in 1315 without male heirs opened a succession crisis in the Principality.
Henry I Lackland	21 March 1256; Son of John I and Judith of Saxony	27 November 1308 – 14 February 1318	Margraviate of Stendal (at Delitzsch since 1297; at Stendal since 1308)	Agnes of Bavaria; 1303 three children	14 February 1318 aged 61	Younger brother of John II, Otto IV and Conrad I. Started his co-rulership in 1297, receiving seat at Delitzsch; he ended up as successor of his childless elder brother Otto IV.
Regency of Valdemar, Margrave of Brandenburg-Stendal (1308–1316)						Children of Herman, divided the land: John V received the core of Salzwedel; Matilda received a seat at Lower Lusatia; Agnes received a seat at Altmark; Jutta received a seat at Coburg.; John's and Agnes' childless deaths left the main core of Salzwedel and the important seat of the Altmark to be reunited in Brandenburg. The remaining possessions were annexed by the respective marriages.
John V the Illustrious	August 1302; Son of Herman and Anne of Austria	1 February 1308 – 26 March 1317	Margraviate of Salzwedel (at Salzwedel)	Unmarried	26 March 1317; Spandau aged 14	Children of Herman, divided the land: John V received the core of Salzwedel; Matilda received a seat at Lower Lusatia; Agnes received a seat at Altmark; Jutta received a seat at Coburg.; John's and Agnes' childless deaths left the main core of Salzwedel and the important seat of the Altmark to be reunited in Brandenburg. The remaining possessions were annexed by the respective marriages.
Matilda	1296; First daughter of Herman and Anne of Austria	1 February 1308 – 31 March 1329	Margraviate of Salzwedel (at Lower Lusatia)	Henry IV, Duke of Żagań; 5 January 1310 four children	31 March 1329 aged 32–33	Children of Herman, divided the land: John V received the core of Salzwedel; Matilda received a seat at Lower Lusatia; Agnes received a seat at Altmark; Jutta received a seat at Coburg.; John's and Agnes' childless deaths left the main core of Salzwedel and the important seat of the Altmark to be reunited in Brandenburg. The remaining possessions were annexed by the respective marriages.
Agnes	1297; Second daughter of Herman and Anne of Austria	1 February 1308 – 27 November 1334	Margraviate of Salzwedel (at Altmark)	Valdemar, Margrave of Brandenburg-Stendal; 1309 no children Otto, Duke of Brunswick-Lüneburg; 1319 no children	27 November 1334; Braunschweig aged 36–37	Children of Herman, divided the land: John V received the core of Salzwedel; Matilda received a seat at Lower Lusatia; Agnes received a seat at Altmark; Jutta received a seat at Coburg.; John's and Agnes' childless deaths left the main core of Salzwedel and the important seat of the Altmark to be reunited in Brandenburg. The remaining possessions were annexed by the respective marriages.
Judith	1301; Third daughter of Herman and Anne of Austria	1 February 1308 – 1353	Margraviate of Salzwedel (at Coburg)	Henry VI, Count of Henneberg-Coburg; 1 January 1317 or 1 February 1319 five children	1353 aged 51–52	Children of Herman, divided the land: John V received the core of Salzwedel; Matilda received a seat at Lower Lusatia; Agnes received a seat at Altmark; Jutta received a seat at Coburg.; John's and Agnes' childless deaths left the main core of Salzwedel and the important seat of the Altmark to be reunited in Brandenburg. The remaining possessions were annexed by the respective marriages.
Salzwedel and Altmark reunited with Stendal; Coburg returned to the House of Henneberg, and Lower Lusatia was inherited by the Duchy of Żagań
Elisabeth of Meissen	c.1280? Daughter of Frederick of Meissen, Margrave of Dresden and Judith of Schwarzburg-Blankenburg	24 July 1315 – 1332	Principality of Aschersleben (in Aschersleben)	Otto II; 24 August 1309 two children	1332 aged 51–52?	Succession crisis in Aschersleben: Louis IV, Holy Roman Emperor, supported Bernard II, Prince of Anhalt-Bernburg as successor, but Bernard ended up giving his rights to Aschersleben to the Bishopric of Halberstadt. However, it is known that Otto II's widow inherited Aschersleben as a seat, and that she had to obtain consent of her daughters ("heiresses of the Allodial") and approval of Bernard II of Bernburg for making her donations. This may possibly imply that, at least between Otto II's death (1315) and the definite delivery of Aschersleben to Halberstadt (December 1316), both Otto's minor daughters may have inherited the principality, under regency of the Prince of Bernburg, with Elisabeth receiving its main town as a widow's seat.
Regency of Bernard II, Prince of Anhalt-Bernburg (1315-1316)
Catharina	c.1310 First daughter of Otto II and Elisabeth of Meissen	24 July 1315 – December 1316	Principality of Aschersleben (in the remaining principality)	Herman VI, Count of Weimar; 1328 two children	1369 aged 58–59	
Elisabeth	c.1310 Second daughter of Otto II and Elisabeth of Meissen	24 July 1315 – December 1316	Principality of Aschersleben (in the remaining principality)	Unmarried	1319 aged 8–9	
The whole Principality was definitively annexed by the Bishopric of Halberstadt
Regency of Valdemar, Margrave of Brandenburg-Stendal (1316-1319)						Albert III and Valdemar I ruled jointly, as sons of Albert II. In 1359 Albert II associated his eldest son, Albert III, but he predeceased him.
Albert II	c.1305 First son of Albert I and Agnes of Brandenburg-Stendal	17 August 1316 – 17 July 1362	Principality of Zerbst	Agnes of Rügen; 2 September 1324 no children Beatrice of Saxe-Wittenberg c.1337 five children	17 July 1362 aged 56–57	Albert III and Valdemar I ruled jointly, as sons of Albert II. In 1359 Albert II associated his eldest son, Albert III, but he predeceased him.
Valdemar I	c.1305 Second son of Albert I and Agnes of Brandenburg-Stendal	17 August 1316 – 7 January 1368	Principality of Zerbst	Elisabeth of Saxe-Wittenberg; 22 June 1344 six children Beatrice d'Este; 1365 no children	7 January 1368 aged 62–63	Albert III and Valdemar I ruled jointly, as sons of Albert II. In 1359 Albert II associated his eldest son, Albert III, but he predeceased him.
Albert III	c.1337 First son of Albert II and Beatrice of Saxe-Wittenberg	1359 – 1 August 1359	Principality of Zerbst	Unmarried	1 August 1359 aged 21–22	Albert III and Valdemar I ruled jointly, as sons of Albert II. In 1359 Albert II associated his eldest son, Albert III, but he predeceased him.
Valdemar the Great	1280; Third son of Conrad I and Constance of Greater Poland	1305 – 14 February 1318	Margraviate of Stendal (at Neumark)	Agnes of Brandenburg-Salzwedel; 1309 no children	14 August 1319; Mieszkowice aged 38–39	Son of Conrad, co-ruled with his uncles since 1308. Left no descendants, and the margraviate went to his underage cousin.
Valdemar the Great	1280; Third son of Conrad I and Constance of Greater Poland	14 February 1318 – 14 August 1319	Margraviate of Brandenburg	Agnes of Brandenburg-Salzwedel; 1309 no children	14 August 1319; Mieszkowice aged 38–39	Son of Conrad, co-ruled with his uncles since 1308. Left no descendants, and the margraviate went to his underage cousin.
Otto VI	1297; Son of Otto IV and Adelaide of Kafernburg	1318 – 28 July 1340	County of Plassenburg	Kunigunde of Leuchtenberg; 1321 no children	28 July 1340 aged 42–43	Left no descendants. After his death his possessions were annexed by the House of Hohenzollern.
Plassenburg annexed to the House of Hohenzollern
Frederick I the Elder	c.1290 First son of Herman IV and Matilda of Rabenswald	1319 – 25 July 1365	County of Weimar	Elisabeth of Meissen (d. 2 May 1347); 1322 three children	25 July 1365 aged 74–75	Children of Herman IV, divided their inheritance.
Otto V	c.1290 Third son of Herman IV and Matilda of Rabenswald	1319 – 12 March 1335	County of Lauenstein	Helena of Nuremberg; 1321 three children	12 March 1335 aged 44–45	Children of Herman IV, divided their inheritance.
Regency of Wartislaw IV, Duke of Pomerania (1319–1320)						Children of Henry I, divided their inheritance. Henry died as a minor, and the Brandenburg Ascanians were extinct in the male line. Their lands came under the control of the Emperor Louis IV of the House of Wittelsbach, who granted Brandenburg to his eldest son, Louis V of Bavaria. For Sophia, she inherited the Margraviate of Landsberg, which was inherited by her sons.
Henry II the Child	1302; Son of Henry I and Agnes of Bavaria	14 August 1319 – July 1320	Margraviate of Brandenburg	Unmarried	July 1320; Mieszkowice aged 17–18	Children of Henry I, divided their inheritance. Henry died as a minor, and the Brandenburg Ascanians were extinct in the male line. Their lands came under the control of the Emperor Louis IV of the House of Wittelsbach, who granted Brandenburg to his eldest son, Louis V of Bavaria. For Sophia, she inherited the Margraviate of Landsberg, which was inherited by her sons.
Sophia	1300; Daughter of Henry I and Agnes of Bavaria	14 August 1319 – 1356	Margraviate of Brandenburg (at Landsberg)	Magnus I, Duke of Brunswick-Lüneburg; 1327 eight children	1356 aged 55–56	Children of Henry I, divided their inheritance. Henry died as a minor, and the Brandenburg Ascanians were extinct in the male line. Their lands came under the control of the Emperor Louis IV of the House of Wittelsbach, who granted Brandenburg to his eldest son, Louis V of Bavaria. For Sophia, she inherited the Margraviate of Landsberg, which was inherited by her sons.
Brandenburg definitively annexed to the House of Wittelsbach; Landsberg definitely annexed to the House of Welf
Regency of Elizabeth of Holstein-Rendsburg (1322–1330)						
Albert IV	1315; Son of John II and Elizabeth of Holstein-Rendsburg	1322–1343	Duchy of Mölln	Beata of Schwerin; 1334 three child Sophia of Werle-Güstrow; 1341 no children	1343 aged 27–28	
Bernard III	1300; Son of Bernard II and Helena of Rügen	1323 – 20 August 1348	Principality of Bernburg	Agnes of Saxe-Wittenberg; 1328 five children Matilda of Anhalt-Zerbst; 1339 no children Matilda of Brunswick-Wolfenbüttel; 1343 two children	20 August 1348 aged 47–48	
Frederick II	c.1321 Son of Otto V and Helena of Nuremberg	12 March 1335 – 14 October 1368	County of Lauenstein	Sophia of Schwarzburg-Blankenburg (d.1392); 18 November 1357 two children	14 October 1368 aged 46–47	
Eric II	1318; Ratzeburg; Son of Eric I and Elisabeth of Pomerania	1338–1368	Duchy of Ratzeburg	Agnes of Holstein-Plön between 1342 and 1349 four children	1368; Ratzeburg aged 49–50	
Regency of Sophia of Werle-Güstrow (1343-1349)						Left no descendants. He was succeeded by his brother, Albert.
John III	c.1335 First son of Albert IV and Beata of Schwerin	1343–1356	Duchy of Mölln	Unmarried	1356 aged 20–21	Left no descendants. He was succeeded by his brother, Albert.
Bernard IV	c.1330 First son of Bernard III and Agnes of Saxe-Wittenberg	20 August 1348 – 28 June 1354	Principality of Bernburg	Unmarried	28 June 1354 aged 23–24	
Frederick III	c.1320 First son of Henry I and Irmgard of Schwarzburg-Blankenburg	26 March 1354 – 1379	County of Orlamünde (at Schauenforst)	Unknown two children	1379 aged 58–59	Children of Henry I, ruled jointly. In 1354, Orlamunde was annexed to the House of Wettin, and the family changed seat to Schauenforst, while Frederick's brother Henry II ruled from Droyssig. After Henry's death, Frederick reunited Orlamunde.
Henry II	c.1320 Second son of Henry I and Irmgard of Schwarzburg-Blankenburg	26 March 1354 – 1357	County of Orlamünde (at Droyssig)	Richeza of Henneberg (d.1379); 1357 one child	1357 aged 36–37	Children of Henry I, ruled jointly. In 1354, Orlamunde was annexed to the House of Wettin, and the family changed seat to Schauenforst, while Frederick's brother Henry II ruled from Droyssig. After Henry's death, Frederick reunited Orlamunde.
Henry IV	c.1330 Second son of Bernard III and Agnes of Saxe-Wittenberg	28 June 1354 – 7 July 1374	Principality of Bernburg	Sophia of Stolberg c.1345 three children	7 July 1374 aged 43–44	Unlike usual co-rulerships seen in the family, Henry was bypassed by his older brother Bernard, who ruled alone. He only assumed rule of the principality when Bernard died in 1354.
Albert V	c.1335 Second son of Albert IV and Beata of Schwerin	1356–1370	Duchy of Mölln	Catherine of Werle-Güstrow; 25 January 1366 no children	1370 aged 34–35	Left no descendants. He was succeeded by his brother, Eric.
Rudolph II the Blind	1307; Wittenberg; Son of Rudolph I and Judith of Brandenburg-Salzwedel	12 March 1356 – 6 December 1370	Electorate of Saxony	Elisabeth of Hesse (d.1354); 1336 three children Elisabeth of Lindow-Ruppin c.1355? no children	6 December 1370; Wittenberg aged 62–63	Left no descendants. He was succeeded by his half-brother.
Herman VI	c.1290? Second son of Herman IV and Matilda of Rabenswald	25 July 1365 – 1372	County of Weimar	Catherine of Anhalt (d. 15 April 1369); 1328 two children	1372 aged 81–82?	Uncle and nephew possibly ruled jointly. After Herman's death Weimar was annexed to the House of Wettin.
Frederick IV the Younger	c.1325 Son of Frederick I and Elisabeth of Meissen	25 July 1365 – 1372	County of Weimar	Irmgard no children	1381 aged 55–56	Uncle and nephew possibly ruled jointly. After Herman's death Weimar was annexed to the House of Wettin.
Definitively annexed to the House of Wettin
Otto VII	c.1360 Son of Frederick II and Sophia of Schwarzburg-Blankenburg	14 October 1368 – 1405	County of Lauenstein	Liutgard Reuss of Gera (d.c.1410) c.1390 six children	1405; Ludwigsstadt aged 44–45	
John II	c.1340 Second son of Albert II and Beatrice of Saxe-Wittenberg	7 January 1368 – 11 April 1382	Principality of Zerbst	Elisabeth of Henneberg-Schleusingen; 1366 four children	11 April 1382 aged 41–42	Double cousins, ruled jointly.
Valdemar II	c.1345 Son of Valdemar I and Elisabeth of Saxe-Wittenberg	7 January 1368 – 1371	Principality of Zerbst	Unmarried	1371 aged 25–26	Double cousins, ruled jointly.
Wenceslaus	1337; Wittenberg; Son of Rudolph I and Agnes of Lindow-Ruppin	6 December 1370 – 15 May 1388	Electorate of Saxony	Cecilia da Carrara; 23 January 1376 six children	15 May 1388; Celle aged 50–51	Brother of his predecessor. In 1370, jointly with his nephew Albert, he managed to acquire the Principality of Lüneburg. This conquer was lost after his death.
Eric III	c.1335 Third son of Albert IV and Beata of Schwerin	1370 – 25 May 1401	Duchy of Mölln	Unmarried	25 May 1401; Ratzeburg aged 65–66?	Determined to enter to clergy, has to resign to succeed his brothers. He also left no descendants, which allowed the Ratzeburg line to reunite the Duchy of Lauenburg.
Mölln was annexed to Ratzeburg; Reunion of Lauenburg
Otto III	c.1345 Son of Bernard III and Matilda of Brunswick-Wolfenbüttel	7 July 1374 – 27 February 1404	Principality of Bernburg	Unknown two children Lutrudis before 1391 one child	27 February 1404 aged 58–59	
Frederick V	c.1360? Son of Frederick III	1379–1405	County of Orlamünde (at Droyssig)	Catherine of Gleichen c.1380? two children	c.1405 aged 44–45	Changed seat once more to Droyssig.
Sigismund I	c.1370 First son of John II and Elisabeth of Henneberg-Schleusingen	11 April 1382 – 19 January 1405	Principality of Dessau (in co-rulership in Zerbst until 1396)	Judith of Querfurt; 1386 eleven children	19 January 1405; Coswig aged 34–35	Sons of John II. Ruled jointly until 1396, when they divided their inheritance.
Albert IV	c.1370 Second son of John II and Elisabeth of Henneberg-Schleusingen	11 April 1382 – 24 November 1423	Principality of Köthen (in co-rulership in Zerbst until 1396)	Elisabeth of Mansfeld (I) before 1398 six children Elisabeth of Querfurt before 4 January 1419 three children	24 November 1423; Coswig aged 52–53	Sons of John II. Ruled jointly until 1396, when they divided their inheritance.
Valdemar III	c.1370 Third son of John II and Elisabeth of Henneberg-Schleusingen	11 April 1382 – 1391	Principality of Zerbst	Unmarried	1391 aged 20–21?	Sons of John II. Ruled jointly until 1396, when they divided their inheritance.
Zerbst divided between Kothen and Dessau
Rudolph III	1378; Wittenberg; First son of Wenceslaus and Cecilia da Carrara	15 May 1388 – 11 June 1419	Electorate of Saxony	Anna of Meissen; 1387/89 three children Barbara of Legnica; March 1396 two children	11 June 1419 in Bohemia (Prague (?)) aged 40–41	Left no male descendants. he was succeeded by his brother, Albert.
Eric IV	1354; Ratzeburg; Son of Eric II and Agnes of Holstein-Plön	1368 – 25 May 1401	Duchy of Ratzeburg	Sophia of Brunswick-Lüneburg; 8 April 1373 ten children	21 June 1412; Ratzeburg aged 57–58	In 1401 reunited Saxe-Lauenburg.
Eric IV	1354; Ratzeburg; Son of Eric II and Agnes of Holstein-Plön	25 May 1401 – 21 June 1412	Duchy of Lauenburg	Sophia of Brunswick-Lüneburg; 8 April 1373 ten children	21 June 1412; Ratzeburg aged 57–58	In 1401 reunited Saxe-Lauenburg.
In 1401 the Ratzeburg line inherited the duchy of Mölln and reunited the Duchy of Lauenburg.
Bernard V	c.1350 Son of Henry IV and Sophia of Stolberg	27 February 1404 – 24 June 1420	Principality of Bernburg	Elisabeth of Hohnstein-Kelbra; 8 September 1396 one child	24 June 1420 aged 69–70?	Cousins, ruled jointly. As neither of them left male heirs, the land was inherited by his other cousin, Bernard.
Otto IV	c.1380? First son of Otto III	27 February 1404 – 1 May 1415	Principality of Bernburg	Unmarried	1 May 1415 aged 34–35?	Cousins, ruled jointly. As neither of them left male heirs, the land was inherited by his other cousin, Bernard.
Valdemar IV	c.1386 First son of Sigismund I and Judith of Querfurt	19 January 1405 – 1417	Principality of Dessau	Unmarried	1417 aged 30–31	Sons of Sigismund I, ruled jointly. In 1468 inherited Anhalt-Bernburg.
George I the Elder	1390; Second son of Sigismund I and Judith of Querfurt	19 January 1405 – 22 September 1474	Principality of Dessau	Matilda of Anhalt-Bernburg I after 1413 no children Euphemia of Oleśnica; 1432 six children Sophia of Hohnstein after 1442 three children Anna of Lindow-Ruppin; 7 September 1453 nine children	21 September 1474; Dessau aged 83–84?	Sons of Sigismund I, ruled jointly. In 1468 inherited Anhalt-Bernburg.
Sigismund II	c.1390 Fourth son of Sigismund I and Judith of Querfurt	19 January 1405 – 1452	Principality of Dessau	Matilda of Anhalt-Bernburg II no children	1452 aged 61–62	Sons of Sigismund I, ruled jointly. In 1468 inherited Anhalt-Bernburg.
Albert V	c.1390 Fifth son of Sigismund I and Judith of Querfurt	19 January 1405 – 1469	Principality of Dessau	Sophie of Hadmersleben no children	1469 aged 78–79	Sons of Sigismund I, ruled jointly. In 1468 inherited Anhalt-Bernburg.
William	c.1395 First son of Otto VII and Liutgard Reuss of Gera	1405 – 3 March 1460	County of Lauenstein	Catherine of Blankenhain; 1427 two children	3 March 1460 aged 64–65?	Children of Otto VII, divided their inheritance, which was progressively annexed to the House of Wettin. Elisabeth's part of Lauenstein went to the House of Schwarzburg.
Elisabeth (II)	c.1395 Daughter of Otto VII and Liutgard Reuss of Gera	1405–1450	County of Lauenstein	Henry XVIII, Count of Schwarzburg-Blankenburg no children	c.1450 aged 54–55?	Children of Otto VII, divided their inheritance, which was progressively annexed to the House of Wettin. Elisabeth's part of Lauenstein went to the House of Schwarzburg.
Otto VIII	c.1395 Second son of Otto VII and Liutgard Reuss of Gera	1405 – 30 March 1460	County of Lauenstein (at Grafenthal)	Agnes of Beichlingen (d. 2 May 1347); 1322 three children	30 March 1460 aged 64–65?	Children of Otto VII, divided their inheritance, which was progressively annexed to the House of Wettin. Elisabeth's part of Lauenstein went to the House of Schwarzburg.
Sigismund	c.1395 Third son of Otto VII and Liutgard Reuss of Gera	1405 – 2 July 1447	County of Lauenstein (at Lichtenberg)	Unmarried	2 July 1447 aged 51–52?	Children of Otto VII, divided their inheritance, which was progressively annexed to the House of Wettin. Elisabeth's part of Lauenstein went to the House of Schwarzburg.
Definitively annexed to the House of Wettin
Henry III	c.1390? First son of Frederick V and Catherine of Gleichen	1405–1423	County of Orlamünde (at Droyssig)	Unmarried	1423 aged 32–33?	Children of Frederick V, ruled jointly. After their childless deaths their possessions were annexed by the House of Wettin.
Martin	c.1390? Second son of Frederick V and Catherine of Gleichen	1405	County of Orlamünde (at Droyssig)	Unmarried	1405 aged 14–15?	Children of Frederick V, ruled jointly. After their childless deaths their possessions were annexed by the House of Wettin.
Definitively annexed to the House of Wettin
Eric V	c.1375 Ratzeburg; First son of Eric IV and Sophia of Brunswick-Lüneburg	21 June 1412 – 1436	Duchy of Lauenburg	Elisabeth of Holstein-Rendsburg; 1404 no children Elisabeth of Weinsberg before 1422 one child	1436; Ratzeburg aged 60–61	Children of Eric IV, ruled jointly.
John IV	c.1375 Ratzeburg; Second son of Eric IV and Sophia of Brunswick-Lüneburg	21 June 1412 – 1414	Duchy of Lauenburg	Unmarried	1414; Ratzeburg aged 38–39	Children of Eric IV, ruled jointly.
Albert III	1380; Wittenberg; Second son of Wenceslaus and Cecilia da Carrara	11 June 1419 – 1422	Electorate of Saxony	Euphemia of Oleśnica; 14 January 1420 no children	1422; Wittenberg aged 41–42	Left no male descendants, which led the Ascanian Saxe-Wittenberg line to extinction.
The Ascanian Dynasty became extinct in Wittenberg in 1422. However, the dynasty's presence in Saxony continued, through the Duchy of Lauenburg, until 1689. After losing the Saxon Electorate to the Wittenberg line in 1356, and failing to obtain it again in 1422, the recognition of power of this Lauenburg line as Dukes of Saxony weakened. To follow the remnant House of Ascania in Saxe-Lauenburg, follow this table. For the following Electors of Saxony, see Rulers of Saxony.
Bernard VI	c.1390? Second son of Otto III	24 June 1420 – 2 February 1468	Principality of Bernburg	Matilda of Querfurt-Burgscheidungen; 21 October 1419 two children Hedwig of Żagań; 11 March 1434 no children	2 February 1468 aged 77–78?	His children predeceased him, which left him with no heirs at his death in 1468. Bernburg was inherited by the Dessau line.
Anhalt-Bernburg was annexed to Anhalt-Dessau
Adolph I	c.1400 First son of Albert IV and Elisabeth of Mansfeld (I)	24 November 1423 – 28 August 1473	Principality of Köthen	Cordula of Lindow-Ruppin; 2 November 1442; Ruppin seven children	28 August 1473; Zerbst aged 72–73?	Ruled jointly. Adolph ruled with his brother Valdemar V until 1436 and then with Valdemar's son John. In 1436, shortly after his father's death, John III renounced his rights to the principality. In 1471, Adolph concluded a succession contract with George I, Prince of Anhalt-Dessau, which would put the latter's youngest son in Köthen's throne as Valdemar VI.
Valdemar V	c.1400 Second son of Albert IV and Elisabeth of Mansfeld (I)	24 November 1423 – 1436	Principality of Köthen	Sophie of Hadmersleben; 1420 no children	1436 aged 35–36?	Ruled jointly. Adolph ruled with his brother Valdemar V until 1436 and then with Valdemar's son John. In 1436, shortly after his father's death, John III renounced his rights to the principality. In 1471, Adolph concluded a succession contract with George I, Prince of Anhalt-Dessau, which would put the latter's youngest son in Köthen's throne as Valdemar VI.
John III	c.1415? Son of Valdemar V and Sophie of Hadmersleben	1436	Principality of Köthen	Unmarried	1463 aged 47–48?	Ruled jointly. Adolph ruled with his brother Valdemar V until 1436 and then with Valdemar's son John. In 1436, shortly after his father's death, John III renounced his rights to the principality. In 1471, Adolph concluded a succession contract with George I, Prince of Anhalt-Dessau, which would put the latter's youngest son in Köthen's throne as Valdemar VI.
Bernard II	1385; Ratzeburg; Third son of Eric IV and Sophia of Brunswick-Lüneburg	1436 – 16 July 1463	Duchy of Lauenburg	Adelaide of Pomerania-Stolp; 2 February 1429 two children	16 July 1463; Ratzeburg aged 77–78	
John V	18 July 1439; Ratzeburg; Son of Bernard II and Adelaide of Pomerania-Stolp	16 July 1463 – 15 August 1507	Duchy of Lauenburg	Dorothea of Brandenburg; 12 February 1464 twelve children	15 August 1507; Ratzeburg aged 68	
Valdemar VI	1450; Son of George I, Prince of Anhalt-Dessau and Sophia of Hohnstein	28 August 1473 – 1 November 1508	Principality of Köthen	Margaret of Schwarzburg-Arnstadt; 24 January 1485; Köthen four children	1 November 1508; Köthen aged 57–58	After the contract established with Dessau, this line of princes dominated in Köthen. After the death of Adolph in 1473, George I of Dessau's sons, Valdemar VI and Albert VI, ascended to the principality. After Albert's death, Valdemar co-ruled with his nephews. In 1508, all his co-rulers abdicated to him.
Albert VI	c.1420 Son of Albert IV and Elisabeth of Querfurt	28 August 1473 – 9 January 1475	Principality of Köthen	Elisabeth of Mansfeld (II); 27 March 1454; Alsleben seven children	9 January 1475 aged 54–55	After the contract established with Dessau, this line of princes dominated in Köthen. After the death of Adolph in 1473, George I of Dessau's sons, Valdemar VI and Albert VI, ascended to the principality. After Albert's death, Valdemar co-ruled with his nephews. In 1508, all his co-rulers abdicated to him.
Philip	31 May 1468; Son of Albert VI and Elisabeth of Mansfeld (II)	9 January 1475 – 13 November 1500	Principality of Köthen	Unmarried	13 November 1500 aged 32	After the contract established with Dessau, this line of princes dominated in Köthen. After the death of Adolph in 1473, George I of Dessau's sons, Valdemar VI and Albert VI, ascended to the principality. After Albert's death, Valdemar co-ruled with his nephews. In 1508, all his co-rulers abdicated to him.
Magnus	1455; Third son of Adolph I and Cordula of Lindow-Ruppin	28 August 1473 – 1508	Principality of Köthen	Unmarried	29 October 1524 aged 68–69	After the contract established with Dessau, this line of princes dominated in Köthen. After the death of Adolph in 1473, George I of Dessau's sons, Valdemar VI and Albert VI, ascended to the principality. After Albert's death, Valdemar co-ruled with his nephews. In 1508, all his co-rulers abdicated to him.
Adolph II	16 October 1458; Fifth son of Adolph I and Cordula of Lindow-Ruppin	28 August 1473 – 1508	Principality of Köthen	Unmarried	24 March 1526; Merseburg aged 67	After the contract established with Dessau, this line of princes dominated in Köthen. After the death of Adolph in 1473, George I of Dessau's sons, Valdemar VI and Albert VI, ascended to the principality. After Albert's death, Valdemar co-ruled with his nephews. In 1508, all his co-rulers abdicated to him.
Ernest I	1454; First son of George I and Anna of Lindow-Ruppin	21 September 1474 – 12 June 1516	Principality of Dessau	Margaret of Münsterberg; 20 January 1494; Cottbus four children	12 June 1516; Dessau aged 61–62	Sons of George I, co-ruled jointly with their father since 1471, and continued the joint rule after his death.
George II the Strong	1454Second son of George I and Anna of Lindow-Ruppin	1474 – 25 April 1509	Principality of Dessau	Agnes of Pomerania-Barth; 1478 no children	25 April 1509 aged 54–55	Sons of George I, co-ruled jointly with their father since 1471, and continued the joint rule after his death.
Sigismund III	1456; Third son of George I and Anna of Lindow-Ruppin	21 September 1474 – 27 November 1487	Principality of Dessau	Unmarried	27 November 1487; Dessau aged 30–31	Sons of George I, co-ruled jointly with their father since 1471, and continued the joint rule after his death.
Rudolph the Valiant	1466; Fourth son of George I and Anna of Lindow-Ruppin	21 September 1474 – 7 September 1510	Principality of Dessau	Unmarried	7 September 1510 aged 43–44	Sons of George I, co-ruled jointly with their father since 1471, and continued the joint rule after his death.
Magnus I	1 January 1470; Ratzeburg; Son of John V and Dorothea of Brandenburg	15 August 1507 – 1 August 1543	Duchy of Lauenburg	Catherine of Brunswick-Wolfenbüttel; 20 November 1509; Wolfenbüttel six children	1 August 1543; Ratzeburg aged 73	
Wolfgang the Confessor	1 August 1492; Köthen; Son of Valdemar VI and Margaret of Schwarzburg-Arnstadt	1 November 1508 – 23 March 1566	Principality of Köthen (at Coswig only, since 1562)	Unmarried	23 March 1566; Zerbst aged 73	Sole ruler of Köthen. In 1562, without descendants, he abdicated of all his territories, with the sole exception of Coswig (which he kept until his death) to the recreated Principality of Zerbst.
Köthen (and later Coswig) annexed to Zerbst
Regency of Margaret of Münsterberg (1516–1524)						Children of Ernest I, ruled jointly, firstly under their mother. In 1544, the brothers divided the land. Joachim mainteined Dessau to himself; John took Zerbst and refounded Anhalt-Zerbst; George took Plotzkau. After George and Joachim's deaths without descendants, their lands were inherited by their nephews, sons of John III.
John V	4 September 1504; Dessau; Second son of Ernest I and Margaret of Münsterberg	12 June 1516 – 4 February 1551	Principality of Zerbst (in co-rulership in Dessau until 1544))	Margaret of Brandenburg; 15 February 1534; Dessau six children	4 February 1551; Zerbst aged 46	Children of Ernest I, ruled jointly, firstly under their mother. In 1544, the brothers divided the land. Joachim mainteined Dessau to himself; John took Zerbst and refounded Anhalt-Zerbst; George took Plotzkau. After George and Joachim's deaths without descendants, their lands were inherited by their nephews, sons of John III.
George III the Godly	15 August 1507; Dessau; Third son of Ernest I and Margaret of Münsterberg	12 June 1516 – 17 October 1553	Principality of Dessau (in co-rulership until 1544; at Plotzkau since 1544)	Unmarried	17 October 1553; Dessau aged 46	Children of Ernest I, ruled jointly, firstly under their mother. In 1544, the brothers divided the land. Joachim mainteined Dessau to himself; John took Zerbst and refounded Anhalt-Zerbst; George took Plotzkau. After George and Joachim's deaths without descendants, their lands were inherited by their nephews, sons of John III.
Joachim I	7 August 1509; Dessau; Fourth son of Ernest I and Margaret of Münsterberg	12 June 1516 – 6 December 1561	Principality of Dessau (in co-rulership until 1544)	Unmarried	6 December 1561; Dessau aged 52	Children of Ernest I, ruled jointly, firstly under their mother. In 1544, the brothers divided the land. Joachim mainteined Dessau to himself; John took Zerbst and refounded Anhalt-Zerbst; George took Plotzkau. After George and Joachim's deaths without descendants, their lands were inherited by their nephews, sons of John III.
Dessau and Plotzkau annexed to Zerbst
Francis I	1510; Ratzeburg; Son of Magnus I and Catherine of Brunswick-Wolfenbüttel	1 August 1543 – 1571 1573 – 19 March 1581	Duchy of Lauenburg	Sibylle of Saxony; 8 February 1540; Dresden nine children	19 March 1581; Buxtehude aged 70–71	In 1571 – highly indebted – Francis I resigned in favour of his eldest son Magnus II, who had promised to redeem the pawned ducal demesnes with funds he gained as Swedish military commander and by his marriage to a Swedish princess. However, after warring with his son and pushing him back, he regained the title.
Charles I	17 November 1534; Dessau; First son of John V and Margaret of Brandenburg	4 February 1551 – 4 May 1561	Principality of Zerbst (in co-rulership)	Anna of Pomerania-Stettin; 16 May 1557; Zerbst no children	4 May 1561; Zerbst aged 26	Children of John V, ruled jointly. In 1553 inherited Plotzkau from their uncle George III. In 1561 inherited Dessau and Bernburg from their uncle Joachim. In the next year inherited Kothen. From 1570 Joachim Ernest was the sole owner of all Anhalt.
Joachim Ernest	21 October 1536; Dessau; Second son of John V and Margaret of Brandenburg	4 February 1551 – 6 December 1586	Principality of Anhalt (in co-rulership in Zerbst until 1562)	Agnes of Barby-Mühlingen; 3 March 1560; Barby six children Eleonore of Württemberg; 9 January 1571; Stuttgart ten children	6 December 1586; Dessau aged 50	Children of John V, ruled jointly. In 1553 inherited Plotzkau from their uncle George III. In 1561 inherited Dessau and Bernburg from their uncle Joachim. In the next year inherited Kothen. From 1570 Joachim Ernest was the sole owner of all Anhalt.
Bernard VII	17 March 1540; Dessau; Third son of John V and Margaret of Brandenburg	4 February 1551 – 1 March 1570	Principality of Anhalt (in co-rulership in Zerbst until 1562)	Clara of Brunswick-Lüneburg; 28 May 1565; Dessau one child	1 March 1570; Dessau aged 29	Children of John V, ruled jointly. In 1553 inherited Plotzkau from their uncle George III. In 1561 inherited Dessau and Bernburg from their uncle Joachim. In the next year inherited Kothen. From 1570 Joachim Ernest was the sole owner of all Anhalt.
Magnus II	1543; Ratzeburg; Second son of Francis I and Sibylle of Saxony	1571–1573	Duchy of Lauenburg	Sophia of Sweden; 4 July 1568; Stockholm one child	14 March 1603; Ratzeburg aged 59–60	Eldest son of Francis I. He didn't pay the debts he promised to pay and led to war with his father and brothers. Two years later they deposed Magnus II and Francis I re-ascended. Magnus' violent and judicial attempts to regain the duchy failed. In 1588 he was imprisoned for the remainder of his life.
Francis II	10 August 1547; Ratzeburg; Third son of Francis I and Sibylle of Saxony	19 March 1581 – 2 July 1619	Duchy of Lauenburg	Margaret of Pomerania-Wolgast; 26 December 1574; Wolgast four children Maria of Brunswick-Wolfenbüttel; 10 November 1582; Wolfenbüttel fourteen children	2 July 1619; Lauenburg aged 71	Brothers of Magnus II, ruled jointly. Francis was vice-regent from 1578, and administrator from 1581.
Maurice	1551; Ratzeburg; Fifth son of Francis I and Sibylle of Saxony	19 March 1581 – 2 November 1612	Duchy of Lauenburg	Katharina von Spörck; 1581 (annulled 1582) no children	2 November 1612; Buxtehude aged 60–61	Brothers of Magnus II, ruled jointly. Francis was vice-regent from 1578, and administrator from 1581.
John George I the Fragrant	9 May 1567; Harzgerode; First son of Joachim Ernest and Agnes of Barby-Mühlingen	6 December 1586 – 24 May 1618	Principality of Dessau (in co-rulership in the whole Anhalt until 1603)	Dorothea of Mansfeld-Arnstein; 22 February 1588; Hedersleben five children Dorothea of Palatinate-Simmern; 21 February 1595; Heidelberg eleven children	24 May 1618; Dessau aged 51	Sons of Joachim Ernest, ruled jointly. In 1603 divided their inheritance.
Christian I the Longing	11 May 1568; Bernburg; Second son of Joachim Ernest and Agnes of Barby-Mühlingen	6 December 1586 – 17 April 1630	Principality of Bernburg (in co-rulership in the whole Anhalt until 1603)	Anna of Bentheim-Tecklenburg; 2 July 1595; Lorbach sixteen children	17 April 1630; Bernburg aged 61	Sons of Joachim Ernest, ruled jointly. In 1603 divided their inheritance.
Augustus the Victorious	14 July 1575; Dessau; Second son of Joachim Ernest and Eleonore of Württemberg	6 December 1586 – 22 August 1653	Principality of Plötzkau (in co-rulership in the whole Anhalt until 1603)	Sibylle of Solms-Laubach; 25 January 1618; Ansbach eight children	22 August 1653; Plötzkau aged 78	Sons of Joachim Ernest, ruled jointly. In 1603 divided their inheritance.
Rudolph the Sweet	28 October 1576; Harzgerode; Third son of Joachim Ernest and Eleonore of Württemberg	6 December 1586 – 30 July 1621	Principality of Zerbst (in co-rulership in the whole Anhalt until 1603)	Dorothea Hedwig of Brunswick-Wolfenbüttel; 29 December 1605; Wolfenbüttel four children Magdalena of Oldenburg; 31 August 1612; Oldenburg two children	30 July 1621; Zerbst aged 44	Sons of Joachim Ernest, ruled jointly. In 1603 divided their inheritance.
Louis I the Nourishing	17 June 1579; Dessau; Fifth son of Joachim Ernest and Eleonore of Württemberg	6 December 1586 – 7 January 1650	Principality of Köthen (in co-rulership in the whole Anhalt until 1603)	Amöena Amalie of Bentheim-Tecklenburg; 31 October 1606; Rheda two children Sophia of Lippe; 12 September 1626; Detmold two children	7 January 1650; Köthen aged 70	Sons of Joachim Ernest, ruled jointly. In 1603 divided their inheritance.
John Casimir the Penetrating	17 December 1596; Dessau; Son of John George I and Dorothea of Palatinate-Simmern	24 May 1618 – 15 September 1660	Principality of Dessau	Agnes of Hesse-Kassel; 18 May 1623; Dessau six children Sophie Margaret of Anhalt-Bernburg; 14 July 1651; Dessau no children	15 September 1660; Dessau aged 63	
Augustus the Hundred-fold	17 February 1577; Ratzeburg; Son of Francis II and Margaret of Pomerania-Wolgast	2 July 1619 – 18 January 1656	Duchy of Lauenburg	Elisabeth Sophie of Holstein-Gottorp; 5 March 1621; Husum six children Catharina of Oldenburg; 4 June 1633 no children	18 January 1656; Lauenburg aged 78	Left no male descendants; he was succeeded by his half-brother Julius Henry.
Regency of Augustus, Prince of Anhalt-Plötzkau (1621–1642)						
John VI the Well-Formed	24 March 1621; Zerbst; Son of Rudolph and Magdalena of Oldenburg	30 July 1621 – 4 July 1667	Principality of Zerbst	Sophie Augusta of Holstein-Gottorp; 16 September 1649; Gottorp fourteen children	4 July 1667; Zerbst aged 46	
Christian II the Unchangeable	11 August 1599; Amberg; Second son of Christian I and Anna of Bentheim-Tecklenburg	17 April 1630 – 22 September 1656	Principality of Bernburg	Eleonore Sophie of Holstein-Sonderburg; 28 February 1625; Ahrensbök fifteen children	22 September 1656; Bernburg aged 57	Children of Christian I, divided their inheritance.
Frederick the Reasonable	16 November 1613; Ensdorf; Fourth son of Christian I and Anna of Bentheim-Tecklenburg	17 April 1630 – 30 June 1670	Principality of Bernburg (at Harzgerode)	Johanna Elisabeth of Nassau-Hadamar; 10 August 1642; Bückeburg three children Anna Catharina of Lippe-Detmold (31 July 1612 – 15 October 1659); 26 May 1657; Harzgerode no children	30 June 1670; Plötzkau aged 56	Children of Christian I, divided their inheritance.
Regency of Augustus, Prince of Anhalt-Plötzkau, Lebrecht, Prince of Anhalt-Köthen and Emmanuel, Prince of Anhalt-Köthen (1650–1653)						After his death without descendants, his previous regents took over the principality for themselves.
William Louis the Achiever	3 August 1638; Köthen; Son of Louis I and Sophia of Lippe	7 January 1650 – 13 April 1665	Principality of Köthen	Elisabeth Charlotte of Anhalt-Harzgerode; 25 August 1663; Köthen no children	13 April 1665; Köthen aged 26	After his death without descendants, his previous regents took over the principality for themselves.
Ernest Gottlieb	4 September 1620; Plötzkau; First son of Augustus and Sibylle of Solms-Laubach	22 August 1653 – 7 March 1654	Principality of Plötzkau	Unmarried	7 March 1654; Plötzkau aged 33	
Lebrecht I the Pleasant	8 April 1622; Plötzkau; Second son of Augustus and Sibylle of Solms-Laubach	7 March 1654 – 13 April 1665	Principality of Plötzkau	Sophie Eleonore of Stolberg-Wernigerode; 18 January 1655; Plötzkau no children	7 November 1669; Köthen aged 47	Cousins of William Louis, and princes of Anhalt-Plötzkau, they served as regents for their cousin alongside their uncle, Augustus. After William Louis' death in 1665, they took the principality of Köthen for themselves, giving away their inheritance in Plötzkau to Anhalt-Bernburg.
Lebrecht I the Pleasant	8 April 1622; Plötzkau; Second son of Augustus and Sibylle of Solms-Laubach	13 April 1665 – 7 November 1669	Principality of Köthen	Sophie Eleonore of Stolberg-Wernigerode; 18 January 1655; Plötzkau no children	7 November 1669; Köthen aged 47	Cousins of William Louis, and princes of Anhalt-Plötzkau, they served as regents for their cousin alongside their uncle, Augustus. After William Louis' death in 1665, they took the principality of Köthen for themselves, giving away their inheritance in Plötzkau to Anhalt-Bernburg.
Emmanuel the Striving	6 October 1631; Plötzkau; Third son of Augustus and Sibylle of Solms-Laubach	7 March 1654 – 13 April 1665	Principality of Plötzkau	Anna Eleonore of Stolberg-Wernigerode; 23 March 1670; Ilsenburg one child	8 November 1670; Köthen aged 39	Cousins of William Louis, and princes of Anhalt-Plötzkau, they served as regents for their cousin alongside their uncle, Augustus. After William Louis' death in 1665, they took the principality of Köthen for themselves, giving away their inheritance in Plötzkau to Anhalt-Bernburg.
Emmanuel the Striving	6 October 1631; Plötzkau; Third son of Augustus and Sibylle of Solms-Laubach	13 April 1665 – 8 November 1670	Principality of Köthen	Anna Eleonore of Stolberg-Wernigerode; 23 March 1670; Ilsenburg one child	8 November 1670; Köthen aged 39	Cousins of William Louis, and princes of Anhalt-Plötzkau, they served as regents for their cousin alongside their uncle, Augustus. After William Louis' death in 1665, they took the principality of Köthen for themselves, giving away their inheritance in Plötzkau to Anhalt-Bernburg.
Plotzkau definitively annexed to the Principality of Bernburg
Victor Amadeus the Praised	6 October 1634; Harzgerode; Son of Christian II and Eleonore Sophie of Holstein-Sonderburg	22 September 1656 – 14 February 1718	Principality of Bernburg	Elisabeth of Palatinate-Zweibrücken; 16 October 1667; Meisenheim six children	14 February 1718; Bernburg aged 83	Annexed Anhalt-Plötzkau in 1665.
Julius Henry the Lucky	9 April 1586; Wolfenbüttel; Son of Francis II and Maria of Brunswick-Wolfenbüttel	18 January 1656 – 20 November 1665	Duchy of Lauenburg	Anna of East Frisia; 17 March 1617; Grabow no children Elisabeth Sophia of Brandenburg; 4 June 1633; Toužim one son Anna Magdalena of Lobkowicz; 18 August 1632; Vienna six children	20 November 1665; Prague aged 79	
John George II the Filled	17 November 1627; Dessau; Son of John Casimir and Agnes of Hesse-Kassel	15 September 1660 – 7 August 1693	Principality of Dessau	Henriette Catherine of Orange-Nassau; 9 September 1659; Groningen five children	7 August 1693; Berlin aged 65	Prince of Anhalt-Dessau, he also served as regent for his cousin, Emmanuel Lebrecht of Anhalt-Kothen, together with the prince's mother, Anna Eleonore of Stolberg-Wernigerode.
Francis Erdmann the Growing	25 February 1629; Toužim; Son of Julius Henry and Elisabeth Sophia of Brandenburg	20 November 1665 – 30 July 1666	Duchy of Lauenburg	Sibylle Hedwig of Saxe-Lauenburg; 1654 no children	30 July 1666; Schwarzenbek aged 37	Left no descendants; He was succeeded by his brother Julius Francis.
Julius Francis	16 September 1641; Prague; Son of Julius Henry and Anna Magdalena of Lobkowicz	30 July 1666 – 30 September 1689	Duchy of Lauenburg	Hedwig of the Palatinate-Sulzbach; 9 April 1668; Sulzbach two children	30 September 1689; Zákupy aged 48	
Definitively annexed to the House of Welf
Regency of Sophie Augusta of Holstein-Gottorp (1667–1674)						Children of John VI, divided their inheritance.
Charles William the Shadowy	16 October 1652; Zerbst; Third son of John VI and Sophie Augusta of Holstein-Gottorp	4 July 1667 – 3 November 1718	Principality of Zerbst	Sophia of Saxe-Weissenfels; 18 June 1676; Halle three children	3 November 1718; Zerbst aged 66	Children of John VI, divided their inheritance.
Anton Günther	11 November 1653; Zerbst; Fourth son of John VI and Sophie Augusta of Holstein-Gottorp	4 July 1667 – 1 November 1704	Principality of Zerbst (at Mühlingen)	Auguste Antonie Marschall of Bieberstein (3 March 1659 – 28 December 1736); 1 January 1705; Zerbst (morganatic) seven children	10 December 1714; Zerbst aged 61	Children of John VI, divided their inheritance.
John Louis I	4 May 1656; Zerbst; Sixth son of John VI and Sophie Augusta of Holstein-Gottorp	4 July 1667 – 1 November 1704	Principality of Zerbst (at Dornburg)	Christine Eleonore of Zeutsch (5 June 1666 – 17 May 1699); 23 July 1687; Halle (morganatic) seven children	1 November 1704; Dornburg aged 48	Children of John VI, divided their inheritance.
Mühlingen reannexed to Zerbst
William Louis	18 August 1643; Harzgerode; Son of Frederick and Johanna Elisabeth of Nassau-Hadamar	30 June 1670 – 14 October 1709	Principality of Bernburg (at Harzgerode)	Elisabeth Juliana of Solms-Laubach (6 March 1631 – 2 January 1693); 25 July 1671; Laubach no children Sophie Auguste of Nassau-Dillenburg (28 April 1666 – 14 January 1733); 20 October 1695; Frederiksborg no children	14 October 1709; Harzgerode aged 66	After his death, Harzgerode merged again in Bernburg.
Harzgerode reannexed to Bernburg
Regencies of Anna Eleonore of Stolberg-Wernigerode (1670–1690) and John George II, Prince of Anhalt-Dessau (1690–1692)						
Emmanuel Lebrecht	20 May 1671; Köthen; Son of Emmanuel and Anna Eleonore of Stolberg-Wernigerode	20 May 1671 – 30 May 1704	Principality of Köthen	Gisela Agnes of Rath; 30 September 1692; Nienburg (morganatic) ten children	30 May 1704; Köthen aged 33	
Regency of Henriette Catherine of Orange-Nassau (1693–1698)						
Leopold I the Old Dessauer	3 July 1676; Dessau; Son of John George II and Henriette Catherine of Orange-Nassau	7 August 1693 – 7 April 1747	Principality of Dessau	Anna Louise Föhse; 8 September 1698; Dessau (morganatic) ten children	7 April 1747; Dessau aged 70	
Regency of Gisela Agnes of Rath (1704–1715)						With no male heirs, he was succeeded by his brother.
Leopold	29 November 1694; Köthen; Second son of Emmanuel Lebrecht and Gisela Agnes of Rath	30 May 1704 – 19 November 1728	Principality of Köthen	Frederica Henriette of Anhalt-Bernburg; 11 December 1721; Bernburg one child Charlotte Frederike of Nassau-Siegen; 27 June 1725; Weimar two children	19 November 1728; Köthen aged 33	With no male heirs, he was succeeded by his brother.
Charles Frederick	13 July 1668; Bernburg; First son of Victor Amadeus and Elisabeth of Palatinate-Zweibrücken	14 February 1718 – 22 April 1721	Principality of Bernburg	Sophie Albertine of Solms-Sonnenwalde; 25 June 1692; Bernburg six children Wilhelmine Charlotte Nüßler; 1 May 1715; Bernburg two children	22 April 1721; Bernburg aged 52	Children of Victor Amadeus, divided their rule.
Lebrecht	28 June 1669; Second son of Victor Amadeus and Elisabeth of Palatinate-Zweibrücken	14 February 1718 – 17 May 1727	Principality of Bernburg (in Zeitz and Hoym)	Charlotte of Nassau-Schaumburg; Schaumburg Castle; 12 April 1692 five children Everdina Jacoba Wilhelmina van Weede; 27 June 1702; Grave six children Sophie Sibylla of Ingersleben (18 March 1684 – 31 March 1726); 14 September 1725 (morganatic) no children	17 May 1727; Bad Ems aged 57	Children of Victor Amadeus, divided their rule.
John Augustus	29 July 1677; Zerbst; Son of Charles William and Sophia of Saxe-Weissenfels	3 November 1718 – 7 November 1742	Principality of Zerbst	Frederica of Saxe-Gotha-Altenburg; 25 May 1702; Zerbst no children	7 November 1742; Zerbst aged 65	Died without issue. Zerbst was inherited by his cousins from Dornburg.
Victor Frederick	20 September 1700; Bernburg; Son of Charles Frederick and Sophie Albertine of Solms-Sonnenwalde	22 April 1721 – 18 May 1765	Principality of Bernburg	Louise of Anhalt-Dessau; 25 November 1724; Dessau one child Sophie Albertine Fredericka of Brandenburg-Schwedt; 22 May 1733; Potsdam five children Konstanze Fredericka Schmidt; 13 November 1750; Bernburg (morganatic) one child	18 May 1765; Bernburg aged 64	
Victor I Amadeus	7 September 1693; Schaumburg; Son of Lebrecht and Charlotte of Nassau-Schaumburg	17 May 1727 – 15 April 1772	Principality of Bernburg (in Zeitz, Hoym and Schaumburg)	Charlotte Louise of Isenburg-Birstein; 22 November 1714; Birstein six children Hedwig Sophie Henckel of Donnersmarck; 14 February 1740; Pölzig six children	15 April 1772; Schaumburg aged 78	
Augustus Louis	9 June 1697; Köthen; Third son of Emmanuel Lebrecht and Gisela Agnes of Rath	19 November 1728 – 6 August 1755	Principality of Köthen (at Güsten until 1737; at Köthen proper since 1737)	Agnes Wilhelmine von Wuthenau; 23 January 1722; Dresden (morganatic) two children Christine Johanna Emilie of Promnitz-Pless; 14 January 1726; Sorau five children Anna Fredericka of Promnitz-Pless; 21 November 1732; Sorau two children	6 August 1755; Köthen aged 58	Inheritors of Leopold, "fought" (legally) for the inheritance. Heiress of her father, Gisela Agnes claimed her allodial inheritance (possibly, while Augustus Louis, brother of the deceased Leopold, should keep the main principality. According to the Reichskammergericht final decision, she kept her father's collections, and eventually gave up her inheritance (which included the main capital, Köthen, and other estates) when she married (1737), being compensated by her uncle with great sums of money that highly indebted the principality.
Regency of Charlotte Frederike of Nassau-Siegen (1728-1734)
Gisela Agnes	21 September 1722; Köthen; Daughter of Leopold and Frederica Henriette of Anhalt-Bernburg	19 November 1728 – 25 May 1737	Principality of Köthen (at Köthen, Prosigk and Klepzig)	Leopold II, Prince of Anhalt-Dessau; 25 May 1737; Bernburg seven children	20 April 1751; Dessau aged 22	
The property of the Principality of Köthen was reunited in 1737
John Louis II	23 June 1688; Dornburg; First son of John Louis I and Christine Eleonore of Zeutsch	7 November 1742 – 5 November 1746	Principality of Zerbst (in Dornburg 1704–1742; in Zerbst proper since 1742)	Unmarried	5 November 1746; Dornburg aged 58	First cousins of John Augustus I, they were Princes of Dornburg, until its ending by joining it with the inherited Principality of Zerbst.
Christian August	29 November 1690; Dornburg; Third son of John Louis I and Christine Eleonore of Zeutsch	7 November 1742 – 16 March 1747	Principality of Zerbst (in Dornburg 1704–1742; in Zerbst proper since 1742)	Joanna Elisabeth of Holstein-Gottorp; 8 November 1727; Vechelde five children	16 March 1747; Dornburg aged 56	First cousins of John Augustus I, they were Princes of Dornburg, until its ending by joining it with the inherited Principality of Zerbst.
Dornburg reannexed to Zerbst
Leopold II Maximilian	25 December 1700; Dessau; Son of Leopold I and Anna Louise Föhse	7 April 1747 – 16 December 1751	Principality of Dessau	Gisela Agnes of Anhalt-Köthen; 25 May 1737; Bernburg seven children	16 December 1751; Dessau aged 50	
Regency of Joanna Elisabeth of Holstein-Gottorp (1747–1752)						Left no descendants; after his death, his property was annexed by his cousins from Dessau.
Frederick August	8 August 1734; Stettin; Son of Christian August and Joanna Elisabeth of Holstein-Gottorp	16 March 1747 – 3 March 1793	Principality of Zerbst	Caroline Wilhelmina Sophia of Hesse-Kassel; 17 November 1753; Zerbst no children Friederike Auguste Sophie of Anhalt-Bernburg; 22 May 1764; Ballenstedt no children	3 March 1793; Luxembourg aged 58	Left no descendants; after his death, his property was annexed by his cousins from Dessau.
Definitively annexed by the Principality of Anhalt-Dessau
Regency of Dietrich of Anhalt-Dessau (1751–1758)						Initially under regency, Leopold III himself also served later as regent for his cousin, Louis Augustus Karl Frederick Emil from Anhalt-Kothen. After his death the regency in Anhalt-Kothen passed together with the principality of Anhalt-Dessau to his grandson.
Leopold III Frederick Franz	10 August 1740; Dessau; Son of Leopold II Maximilian and Gisela Agnes of Anhalt-Köthen	16 December 1751 – 9 August 1817	Principality of Dessau (until 1807) Duchy of Dessau (from 1807)	Louise Henriette of Brandenburg-Schwedt; 25 July 1767; Charlottenburg two children	9 August 1817; Luisium Castle aged 76	Initially under regency, Leopold III himself also served later as regent for his cousin, Louis Augustus Karl Frederick Emil from Anhalt-Kothen. After his death the regency in Anhalt-Kothen passed together with the principality of Anhalt-Dessau to his grandson.
Charles George Lebrecht	15 August 1730; Köthen; Second son of Augustus Louis and Christine Johanna Emilie of Promnitz-Pless	6 August 1755 – 17 October 1789	Principality of Köthen	Louise Charlotte of Holstein-Glücksburg; 26 July 1763; Glücksburg six children	17 October 1789; Zemun aged 59	Children of Augustus Louis, divided their inheritance.
Frederick Erdmann	27 October 1731; Köthen; Third son of Augustus Louis and Christine Johanna Emilie of Promnitz-Pless	6 August 1755 – 12 December 1797	Principality of Köthen (at Pless)	Louise Ferdinande of Stolberg-Wernigerode; 13 June 1766; Wernigerode nine children	12 December 1797; Pless aged 66	Children of Augustus Louis, divided their inheritance.
Frederick Albert	15 August 1735; Bernburg; Son of Victor Frederick and Sophie Albertine Fredericka of Brandenburg-Schwedt	18 May 1765 – 9 April 1796	Principality of Bernburg	Louise Albertine of Holstein-Plön; 25 November 1724; Augustenburg two children	9 April 1796; Ballenstedt aged 60	
Charles Louis	16 May 1723; Schaumburg; Third son of Victor I Amadeus and Charlotte Louise of Isenburg-Birstein	15 April 1772 – 20 August 1806	Principality of Bernburg (in Schaumburg and Hoym)	Benjamine Gertrude Keiser (1 January 1729 – 6 January 1787); 25 March 1748; Stevensweert (morganatic) Amalia Eleonora of Solms-Braunfels; 12 December 1765; Braunfels five children	20 August 1806; Schaumburg aged 83	
Augustus Christian Frederick	18 November 1769; Köthen; Son of Charles George Lebrecht and Louise Charlotte of Holstein-Glücksburg	17 October 1789 – 5 May 1812	Principality of Köthen (until 1806) Duchy of Köthen (from 1806)	Frederica of Nassau-Usingen; 9 February 1792; Frankfurt-am-Main no children	5 May 1812; Geuz aged 42	In 1806 became Duke of Anhalt-Köthen. Left no descendants, and was succeeded by his nephew.
Alexius Frederick Christian	12 June 1767; Ballenstedt; Son of Frederick Albert and Louise Albertine of Holstein-Plön	9 April 1796 – 24 March 1834	Principality of Bernburg (until 1803) Duchy of Bernburg (from 1803)	Marie Friederike of Hesse-Kassel; 29 November 1794; Kassel (annulled 1817) four children Dorothea Fredericka of Sonnenberg; 11 January 1818; Ballenstedt (morganatic) no children Ernestine Charlotte of Sonnenberg; 2 May 1819; Bernburg (morganatic) no children	24 March 1834; Ballenstedt aged 66	In 1803 became Duke of Anhalt-Bernburg.
Victor II Charles	2 November 1767; Schaumburg; Son of Charles Louis and Amalia Eleonora of Solms-Braunfels	20 August 1806 – 22 April 1812	Principality of Bernburg (in Schaumburg and Hoym)	Amelia of Nassau-Weilburg; 29 October 1793; Weilburg four children	22 April 1812; Schaumburg aged 44	
Frederick	29 November 1741; Schaumburg; Fifth son of Victor I Amadeus and Charlotte Louise of Isenburg-Birstein	22 April – 24 December 1812	Principality of Bernburg (in Schaumburg and Hoym)	Unmarried	24 December 1812	After his childless death, Hoym and Holzappel were inherited by his niece Hermine (daughter of Victor II), while Hoym merged in Bernburg again.
Hoym reannexed to Bernburg
Regencies of Leopold III, Duke of Anhalt-Dessau (1812–1817) and Leopold IV, Duke of Anhalt (1817–1818)						Nephew of Augustus Christian Frederick. Died as a minor, never ruled by his own.
Louis Augustus Karl	20 September 1802; Köthen; Son of Louis of Anhalt-Köthen and Louise Caroline of Hesse-Darmstadt	5 May 1812 – 18 December 1818	Duchy of Köthen	Louise Charlotte of Schleswig-Holstein-Sonderburg-Glücksburg; 26 July 1763; Glücksburg six children	18 December 1818; Leipzig aged 16	Nephew of Augustus Christian Frederick. Died as a minor, never ruled by his own.
Hermine	2 December 1797; Hoym; Daughter of Victor II Charles and Amelia of Nassau-Weilburg	24 December 1812 – 14 September 1817	Principality of Bernburg (in Schaumburg and Holzappel)	Archduke Joseph, Palatine of Hungary; 30 August 1815; Schaumburg Castle two children	14 September 1817; Budapest aged 19	After her death her lands probably merged again in Bernburg.
Schaumburg and Holzappel reannexed to Bernburg
Frederick Ferdinand	25 June 1769; Pless; Second son of Frederick Erdmann and Louise Ferdinande of Stolberg-Wernigerode	18 December 1818 – 23 August 1830	Duchy of Köthen (in Pless 1797–1818; in Köthen proper since 1818)	Maria Dorothea of Holstein-Beck; 26 July 1763; Lindenau bei Heiligenbeil no children Julie of Brandenburg; 20 May 1816; Berlin no children	23 August 1830; Köthen aged 61	From the Anhalt-Pless line, cousin of his predecessor. Attempted, with no success, to reinstall Catholicism in his duchy. Left no descendants; he was succeeded by his brother.
Henry	30 July 1778; Pless; Fourth son of Frederick Erdmann and Louise Ferdinande of Stolberg-Wernigerode	23 August 1830 – 23 November 1847	Duchy of Köthen	Augusta Reuss of Middle Köstritz; 18 May 1819; Trebschen no children	23 November 1847; Köthen aged 69	Left no descendants. His allodial principality of Pless was inherited by his nephew, count Hans Heinrich X. of Hochberg-Fürstenstein. His other possessions were inherited by Leopold of Anhalt-Dessau.
Definitively annexed to the Principality of Anhalt-Dessau
Alexander Charles	2 March 1805; Ballenstedt; Son of Alexius Frederick Christian and Marie Friederike of Hesse-Kassel	24 March 1834 – 19 August 1863	Duchy of Bernburg	Frederica of Holstein-Glücksburg; 30 October 1834; Gottorp no children	19 August 1863; Hoym aged 58	Left no male descendants. Bernburg reverted to Anhalt-Dessau.
Definitively annexed to the Principality of Anhalt-Dessau
Leopold IV Frederick	1 October 1794; Dessau; Son of Frederick of Anhalt-Dessau and Amalie of Hesse-Homburg	9 August 1817 – 22 May 1871	Duchy of Dessau (until 1863) Duchy of Anhalt (from 1863)	Frederica Wilhelmina of Prussia; 18 April 1818; Berlin six children	22 May 1871; Dessau aged 76	Grandson of Leopold III. Ended the regency in Kothen after his cousin's death (1818). In 1863 he reunited Anhalt under his rule, and becomes its first duke.
Frederick I	29 April 1831; Dessau; Son of Leopold IV Frederick and Frederica Wilhelmina of Prussia	22 May 1871 – 24 January 1904	Duchy of Anhalt	Antoinette of Saxe-Altenburg; 22 April 1854; Altenburg six children	24 January 1904; Ballenstedt aged 72	
Frederick II	19 August 1856; Dessau; First son of Frederick I and Antoinette of Saxe-Altenburg	24 January 1904 – 21 April 1918	Duchy of Anhalt	Marie of Baden; 2 July 1889; Karlsruhe no children	21 April 1918; Ballenstedt aged 61	Left no descendants. He was succeeded by his brother.
Edward	18 April 1861; Dessau; Second son of Frederick I and Antoinette of Saxe-Altenburg	21 April – 13 September 1918	Duchy of Anhalt	Louise Charlotte of Saxe-Altenburg; 6 February 1895; Altenburg (annulled 26 January 1918) six children	13 September 1918; Berchtesgaden aged 57	
Joachim Ernest	11 January 1901; Dessau; Son of Edward and Louise Charlotte of Saxe-Altenburg	13 September – 12 November 1918	Duchy of Anhalt	Elisabeth Strickrodt; 3 March 1927; Ballenstedt (morganatic, annulled 1929) no children Edda-Charlotte von Stephani-Marwitz; 15 October 1929; Ballenstedt (morganatic) five children	18 February 1947; Weimar aged 46	Monarchy abolished in that year.

== Notable figures ==
=== Catherine the Great ===
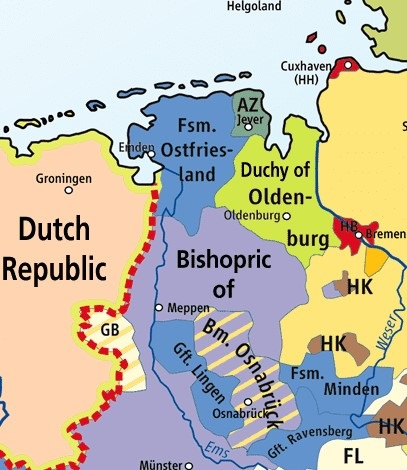
Lordship of Jever in 1789 (top of the map, labeled AZ Jever)

The most famous Ascanian in modern times was the Russian Empress Catherine the Great (* 1729; † 1796), previously named Sophie Auguste Friederike. Her father, Christian August of Anhalt-Zerbst-Dornburg, served as a high-ranking military officer in Prussian service, so she grew up primarily in Szczecin Castle, not Zerbst. In 1745, she married Karl Peter Ulrich of Schleswig-Holstein-Gottorp, the future Russian Emperor Peter III. On this occasion, she converted to Russian Orthodoxy and took the name Yekaterina Alexeyevna in honor of Catherine I. After orchestrating her husband's deposition in 1762, during which he was murdered, she assumed sole rule over Russia, governing for 34 years. Her governing style is associated with enlightened absolutism; she also maintained contact with Voltaire, Cesare Beccaria, and Denis Diderot.

The Zerbst sub-branch of Anhalt-Zerbst-Dornburg was founded by her grandfather John Louis I, which inherited the main Anhalt-Zerbst line again in 1742.

=== Senior members of the House of Anhalt ===
The senior members managed the overall affairs of the Anhalt house per the 1603 division agreement.

- 1603–1618 John George I of Dessau (* 1567; † 1618), Prince
- 1618–1630 Christian I of Bernburg (* 1568; † 1630)
- 1630–1653 August of Plötzkau (* 1575; † 1653)
- 1653–1660 John Casimir of Dessau (* 1596; † 1660)
- 1660–1670 Frederick of Harzgerode (* 1613; † 1670)
- 1670–1693 John George II of Dessau (* 1627; † 1693)
- 1693–1718 Victor I Amadeus of Bernburg (* 1634; † 1718)
- 1718 Charles William of Zerbst (* 1652; † 1718)
- 1718–1721 Karl Frederick of Bernburg (* 1668; † 1721)
- 1721–1747 Leopold I of Dessau, known as "The Old Dessauer" (* 1676; † 1747)
- 1747–1755 August Louis of Köthen (* 1697; † 1755)
- 1755–1765 Victor II Frederick of Bernburg (* 1700; † 1765)
- 1765–1789 Karl George Lebrecht of Köthen (* 1730; † 1789)
- 1789–1796 Frederick Albert of Bernburg (* 1735; † 1796)
- 1796–1817 Leopold III of Dessau (* 1740; † 1817), henceforth dukes
- 1817–1834 Alexius Frederick Christian of Bernburg (* 1767; † 1834)
- 1834–1847 Henry of Köthen (* 1778; † 1847)
- 1847–1863 Leopold Frederick of Dessau (* 1794; † 1871)

=== Ascanian Abbesses ===
The Ascanians also held advocacy and protection rights over the monasteries of Nienburg/Saale and Gernrode. They later maintained a close connection with the Abbey of Gernrode. Abbess Sophia of Anhalt was the sister of Henry I, who received the family estates in 1212. The Gernrode abbesses, as imperial princesses of the Holy Roman Empire, held a seat at the Imperial Diets.

==== Gernrode Abbey ====
- 1044–1046 Hazecha of Ballenstedt, daughter of Adalbert of Ballenstedt
- 1221–1244 Sophia of Anhalt († 1244), daughter of Bernhard III of Saxony
- 1267–1296 Matilda I of Brunswick
- 1348–1374 Adelheid III of Anhalt
- 1445–1463 Mechthild II of Anhalt (* 1392; † 1463)
- 1469–1504 Scholastica of Anhalt (* 1451; † 1504), daughter of George I of Anhalt-Zerbst
- 1565–1569 Elisabeth III of Anhalt
- 1570–1577 Anna Maria of Anhalt (* 1561; † 1605), daughter of Joachim Ernest of Anhalt
- 1578–1581 Agnes Hedwig of Anhalt (* 1573; † 1616), daughter of Joachim Ernest
- 1586–1593 Dorothea Maria of Anhalt (* 1574; † 1617), daughter of Joachim Ernest
- 1593–1610 Sophia Elisabeth of Anhalt

==== Gandersheim Abbey ====
- 1485–1504 Agnes III of Anhalt (* 1445; † 1504), daughter of George I of Anhalt-Zerbst

== Research activities ==
Since the 16th century, court historians of the Anhalt and Saxe-Lauenburg family branches sought to trace their patrons' descent. The Historie des Fürstenthums Anhalt by Johann Christoph Bekmann was published in 1710. Samuel Lenz released Samuelis Lentzii Becmannvs Envcleatvs, Svppletvs Et Continvatvs, Oder: Historisch-Genealogische Fürstellung des Hochfürstlichen Hauses Anhalt in 1757. Philipp Ernst Bertram and Johann Christoph Krause authored the Geschichte des Hauses und Fürstenthums Anhalt, published in 1780 and 1782. The Anhalt court archivist Otto von Heinemann published the Codex diplomaticus Anhaltinus starting in 1867, a collection of documents from 936 to 1400. In 1912 and 1913, the ducal archivist Hermann Wäschke published the three-volume Anhaltische Geschichte, a comprehensive history of Anhalt that became a standard work. Wäschke was appointed archive director and head of the Ducal House and State Archives in Zerbst in 1901. He also founded the Zerbst Historical Society, serving as its chairman for 23 years.

The Historical Commission for Saxony-Anhalt has established a permanent working group on Anhalt history. The Association for Anhalt Regional Studies, based in Köthen, has published a journal on Anhalt history since 1993. The Ducal Anhalt House Order of Albert the Bear, whose Grand Master is Eduard, Prince of Anhalt, honored historian Lutz Partenheimer in 2016 by admitting him as a knight to the house order. This recognition was for his research on Albert the Bear, the formation of the Margraviate of Brandenburg, and the House of Anhalt.

== Armorial ==
The original arms of the house of Ascania, from their ancestors the Saxon counts of Ballenstedt, were "Barry of ten sable and or".

The Ascanian margrave Albert the Bear was invested with the Saxon ducal title in 1138; when he succeeded the Welf's Henry the Lion, who was deposed by Emperor Frederick Barbarossa. In 1180, Albert's son Bernhard, Count of Anhalt received the remaining Saxon territories around Wittenberg and Lauenburg, and the ducal title. Legend, so unlikely to be true, goes that when he rode in front of the emperor, at the occasion of his investiture, he carried a shield with his escutcheon of the Ballenstedt coat of arms (barry sable and or). Barbarossa took the rue wreath he wore against the heat of the sun from his head, hanging it over Bernhard's shield and thus creating the Saxonian crancelin vert ("Barry of ten sable and or, a crancelin vert"). A more likely explanation is that it probably symbolized the waiver of the Lauenburg lands.

When upon German reunification the Free State of Saxony was re-established, the coat of arms was formally confirmed in 1991.

Original Arms of counts of Ballenstedt

Arms of Ascania impaled with the Mark of Brandenburg

Arms of Ascania impaled with the Mark of Brandenburg
Arms of the Arch-Marshal/prince elector of the Saxons of the Holy Roman Empire

Arms of the Elector/Duke of Saxony (Saxe-Wittenburg)
Principality of Anhalt in the 15th century

Principalities of Anhalt in the 17th century

Principality of Anhalt-Köthen in the 18th century

Principality of Anhalt-Zerbst in the 19th century

Coat of Arms of the Duchy of Anhalt

Achievement of the Duchy of Anhalt

The chivalric order was the House Order of Albert the Bear (German: Hausorden Albrechts des Bären or Der Herzoglich Anhaltische Hausorden Albrechts des Bären) which was founded in 1836 as a joint House Order by three dukes of Anhalt from separate branches of the family: Henry, Duke of Anhalt-Köthen, Leopold IV, Duke of Anhalt-Dessau, and Alexander Karl, Duke of Anhalt-Bernburg.

The namesake of the order, Albert the Bear, was the first Margrave of Brandenburg from the House of Ascania. The origin of his nickname "the Bear" is unknown.

Collar of the Order of Albert the Bear

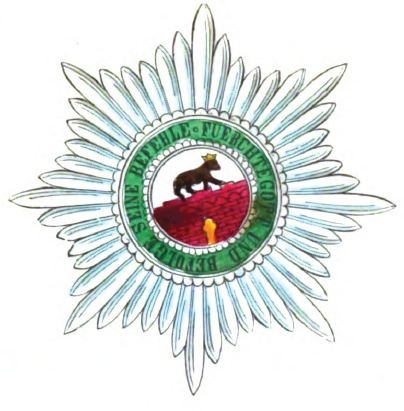
Star of the Order of Albert the Bear

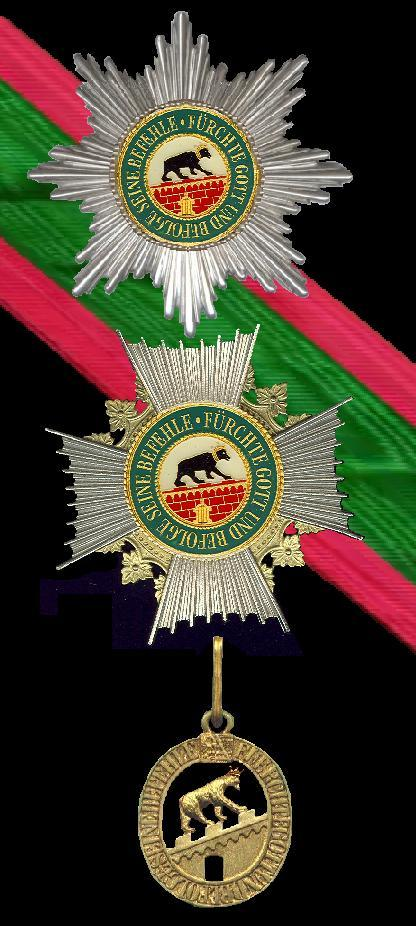
House Order of Albert the Bear

== Ascanian Buildings ==
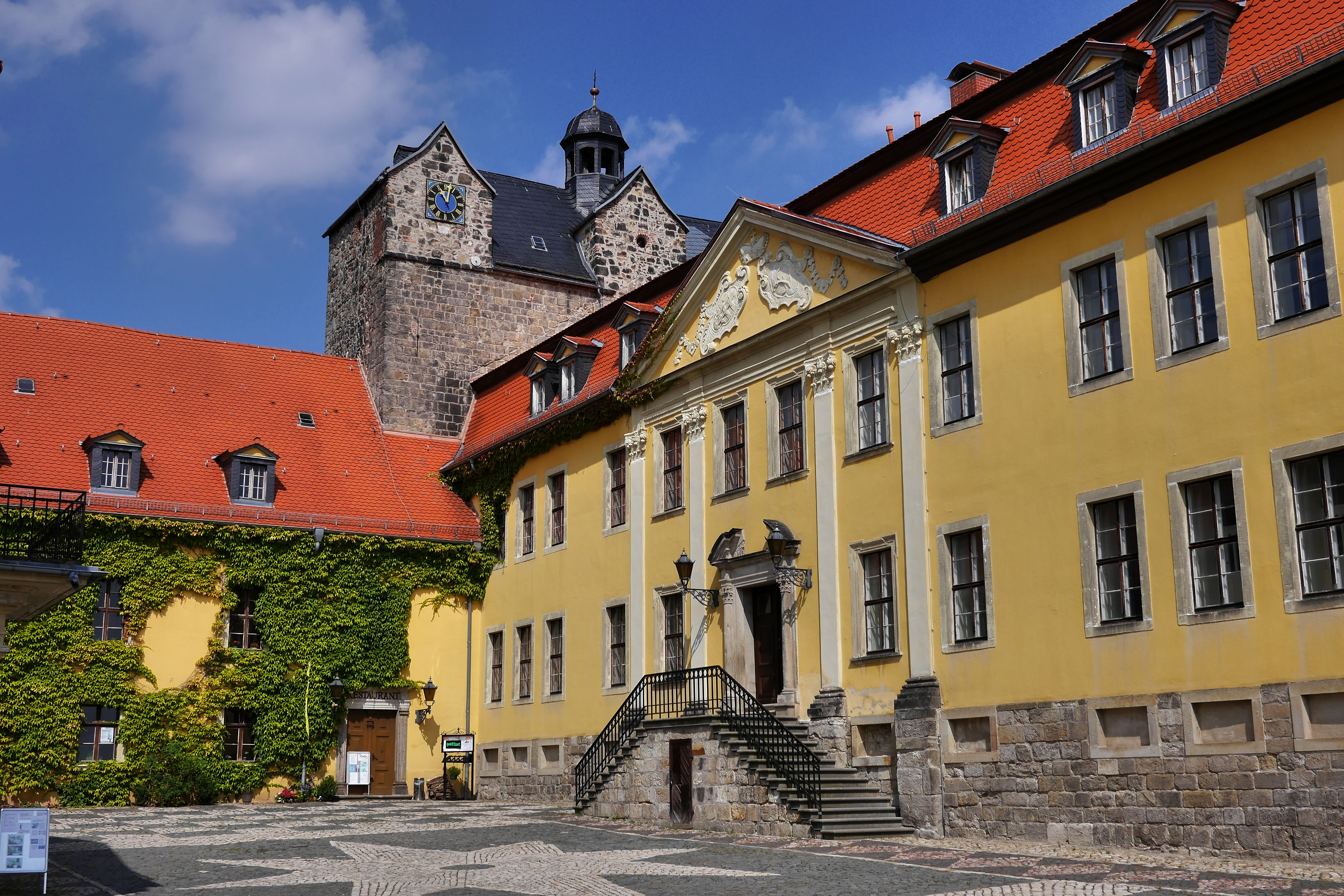
Ballenstedt Castle

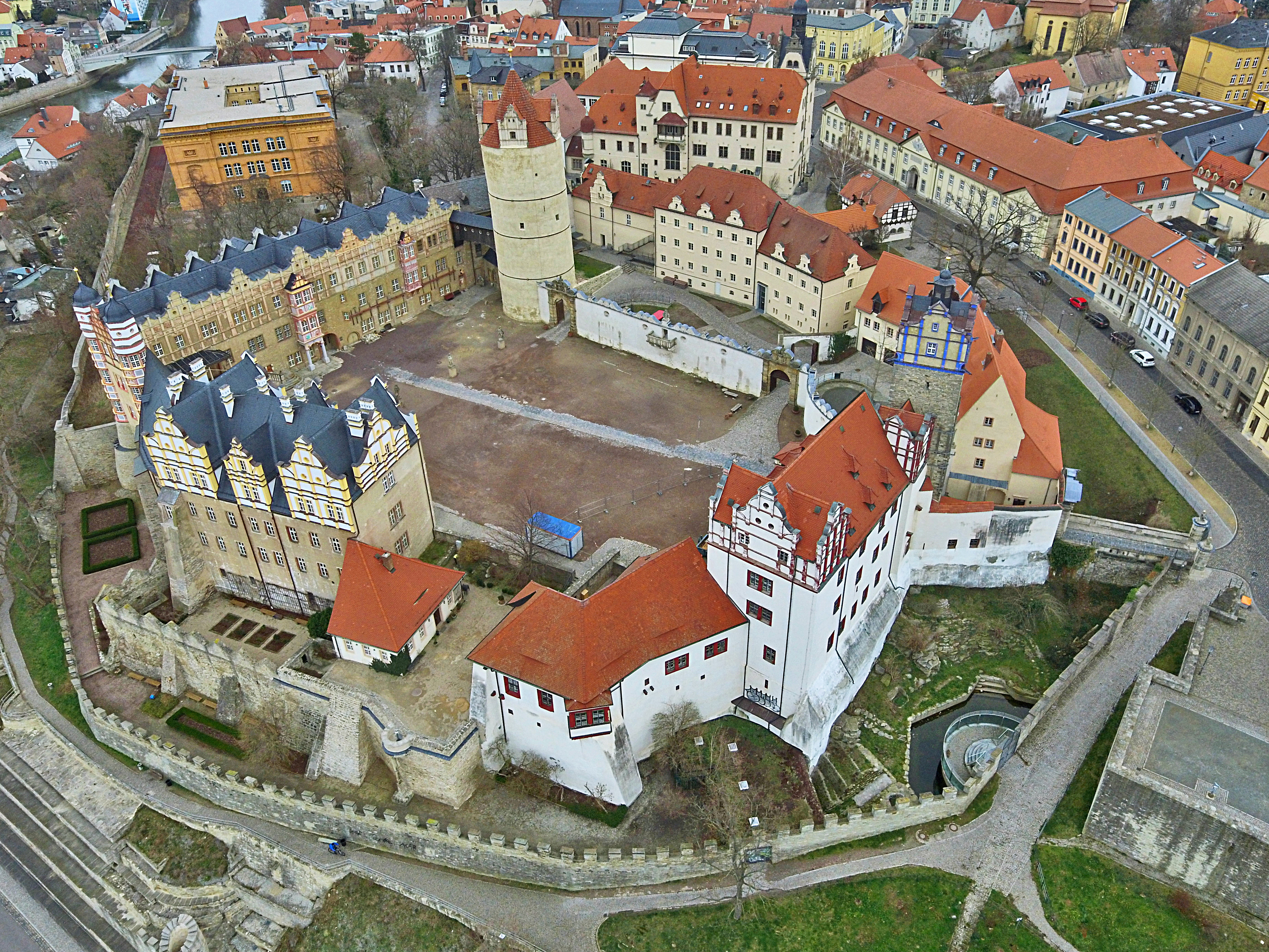
Bernburg Castle

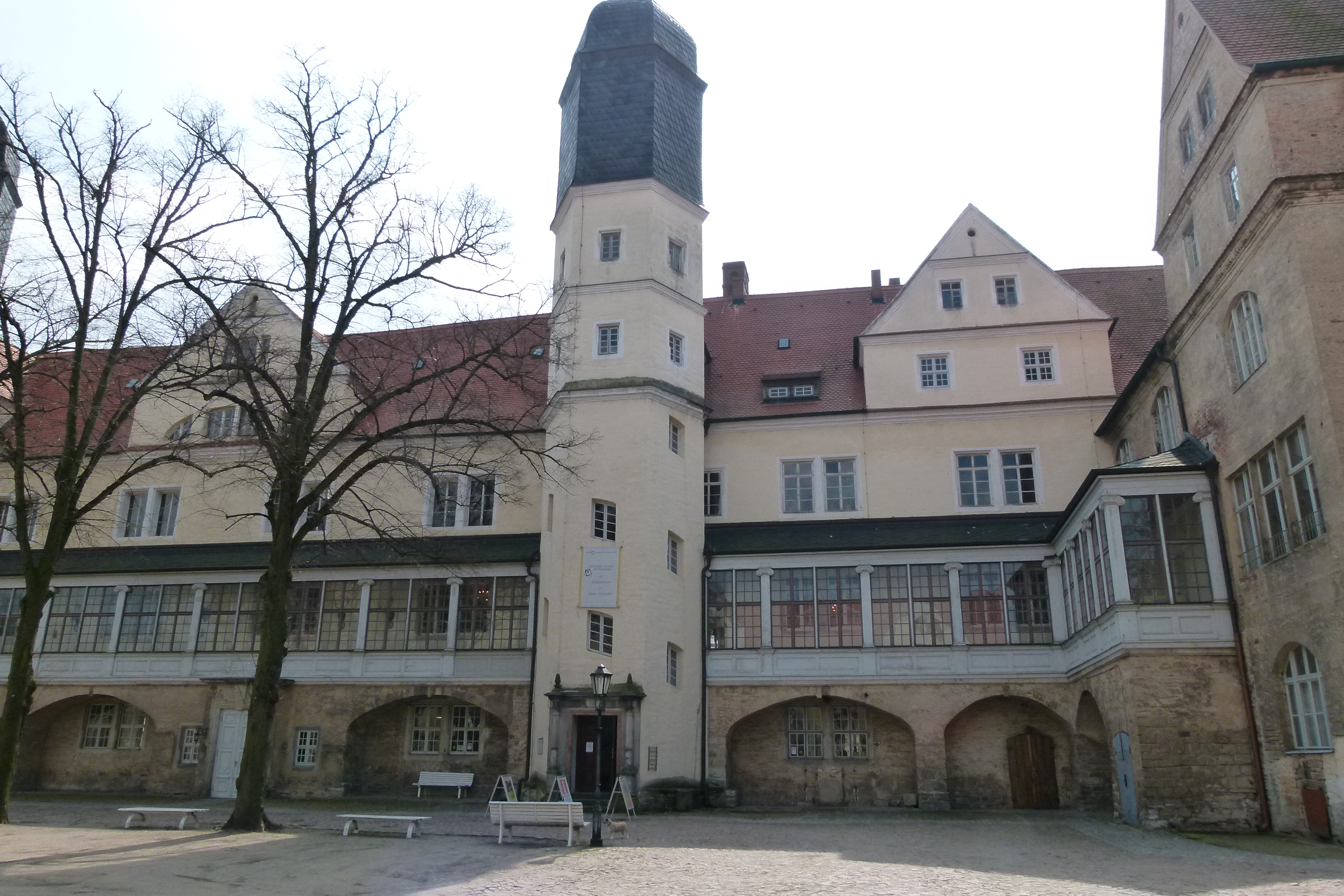
Köthen Castle

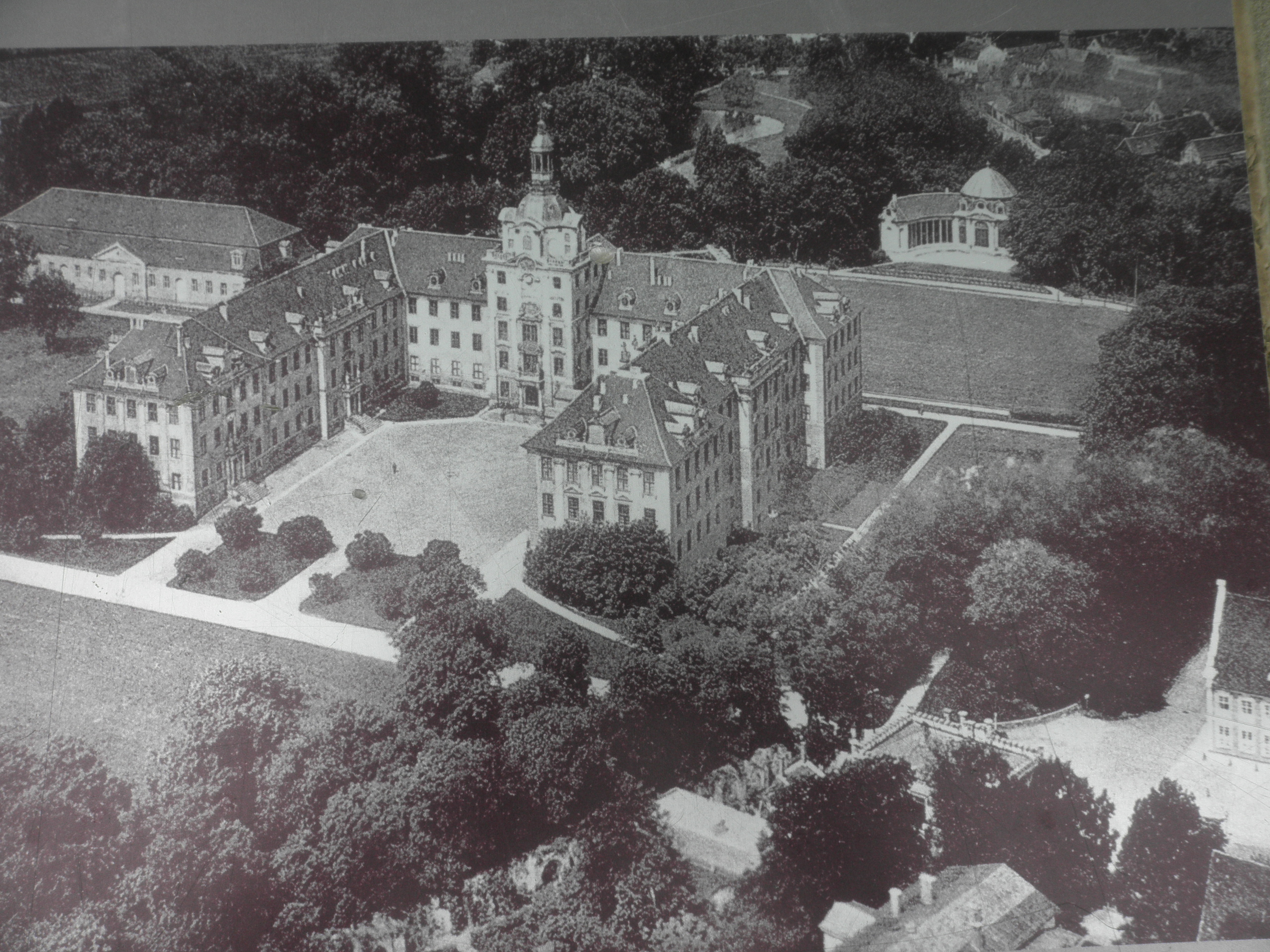
Zerbst Castle

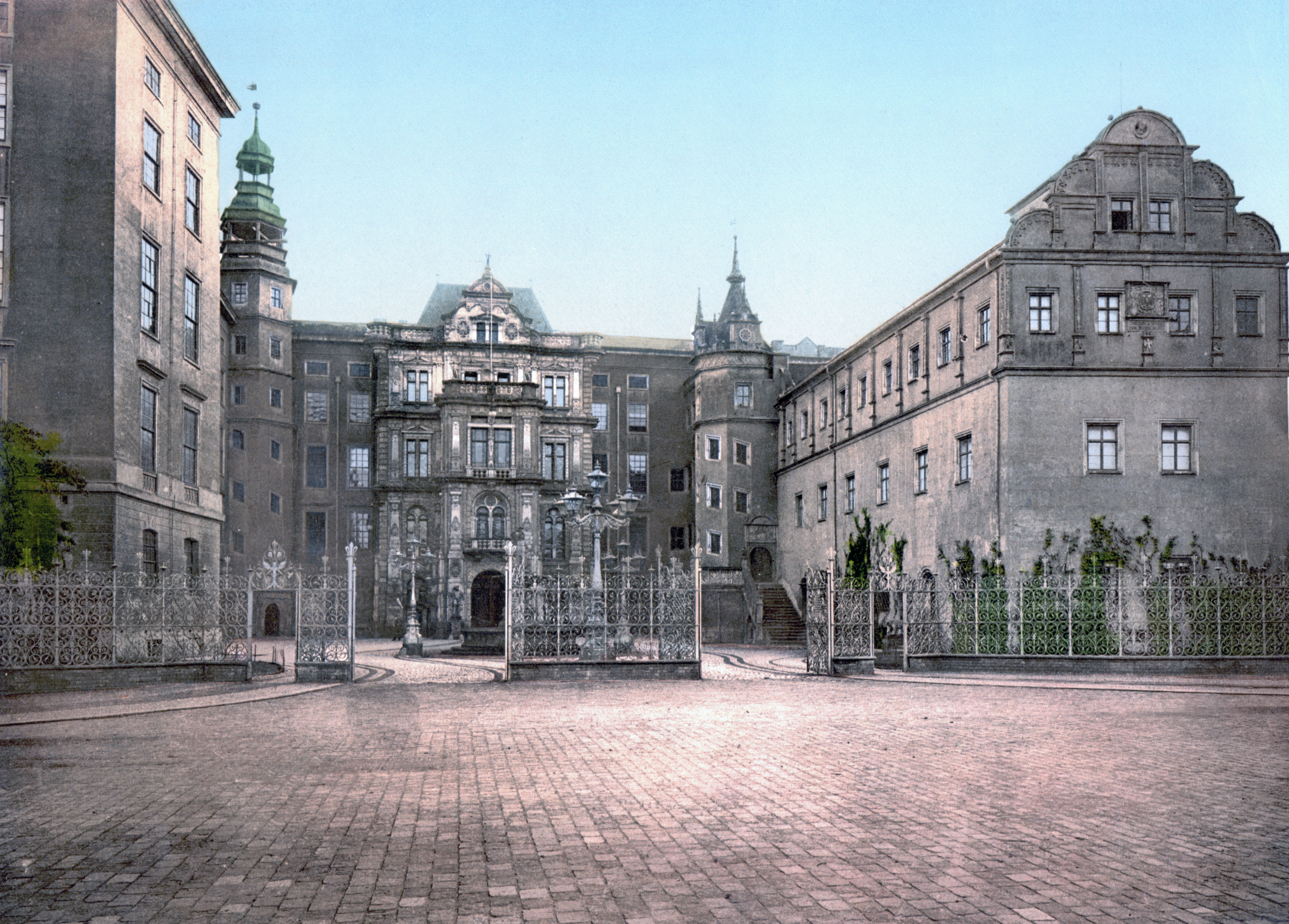
Dessau Palace

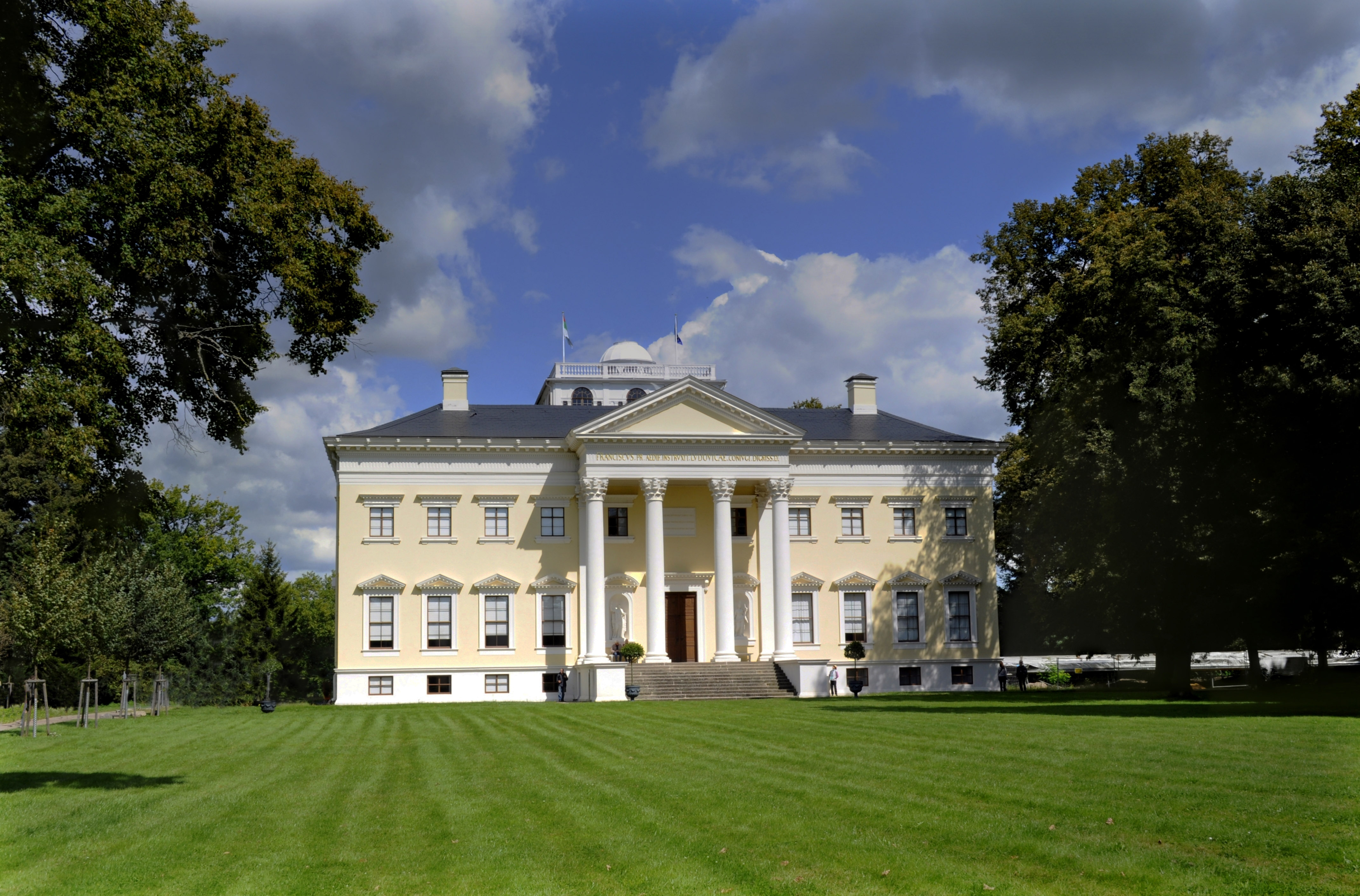
Wörlitz Palace

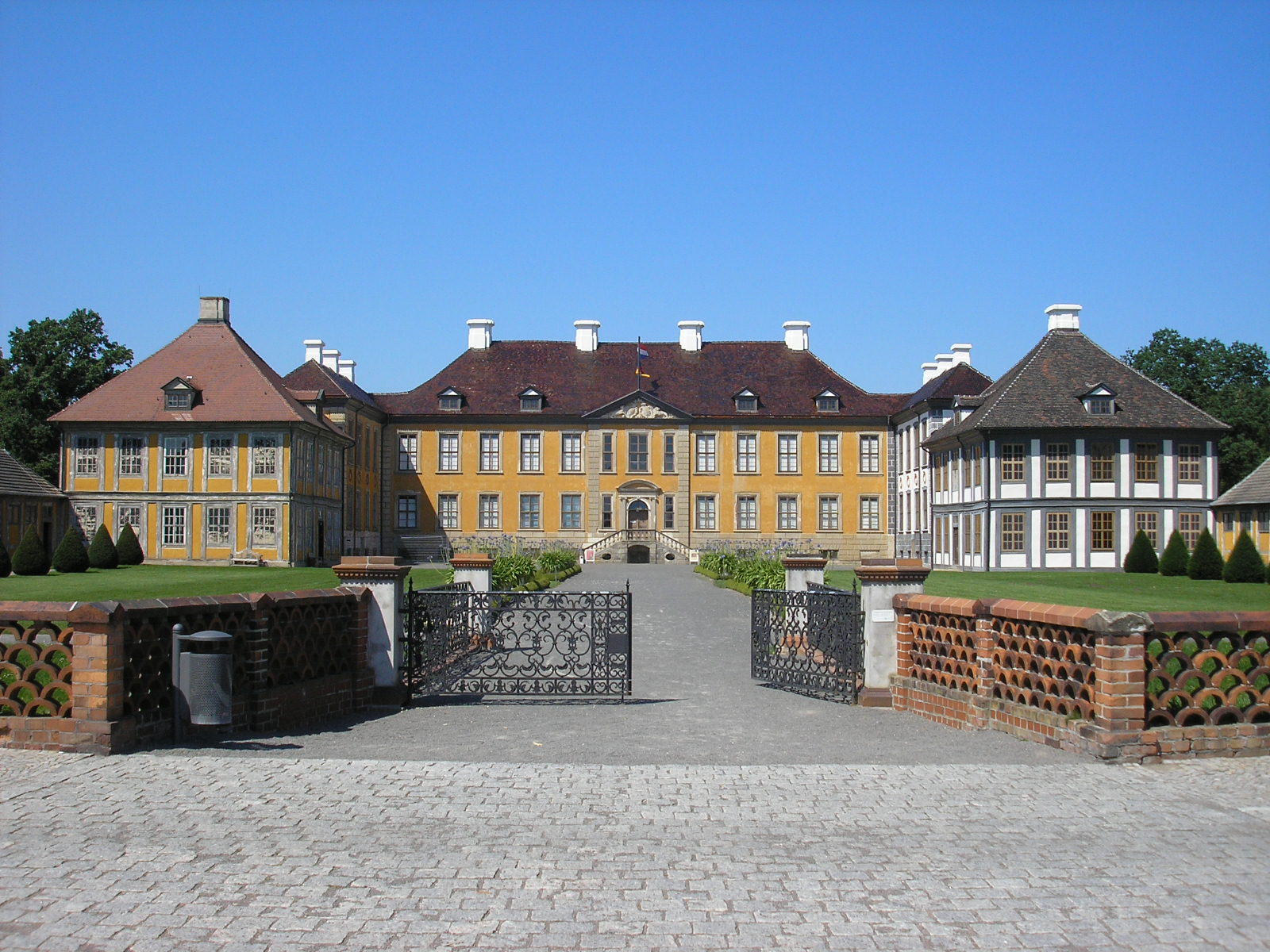
Oranienbaum Palace

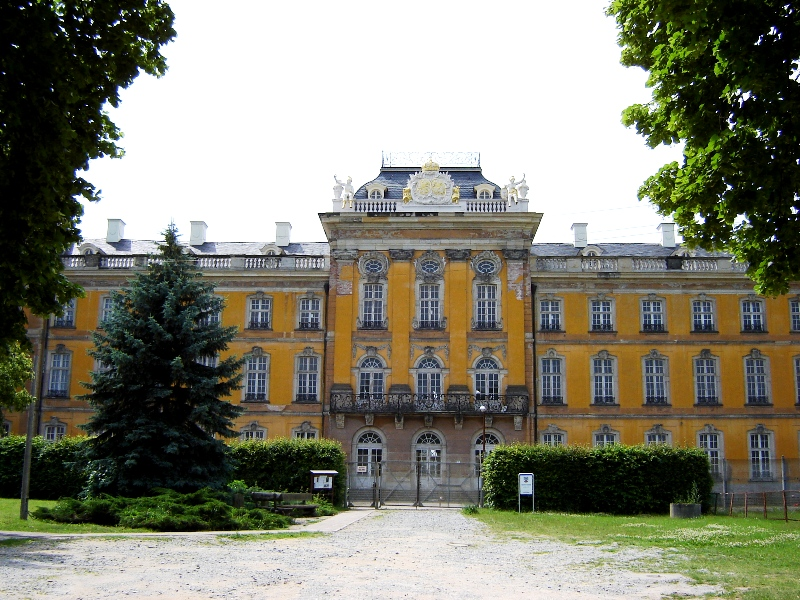
Dornburg Castle

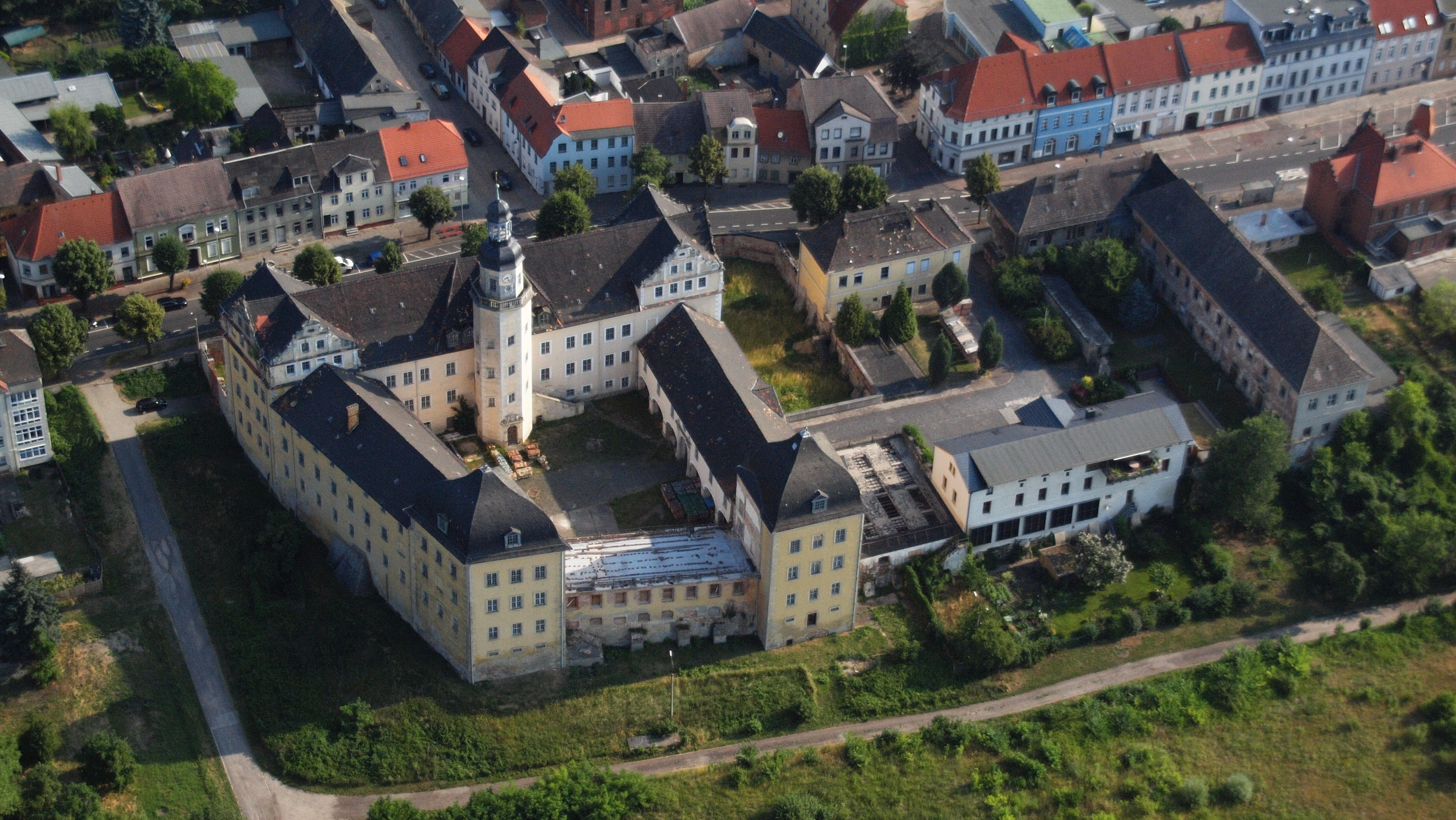
Coswig Castle

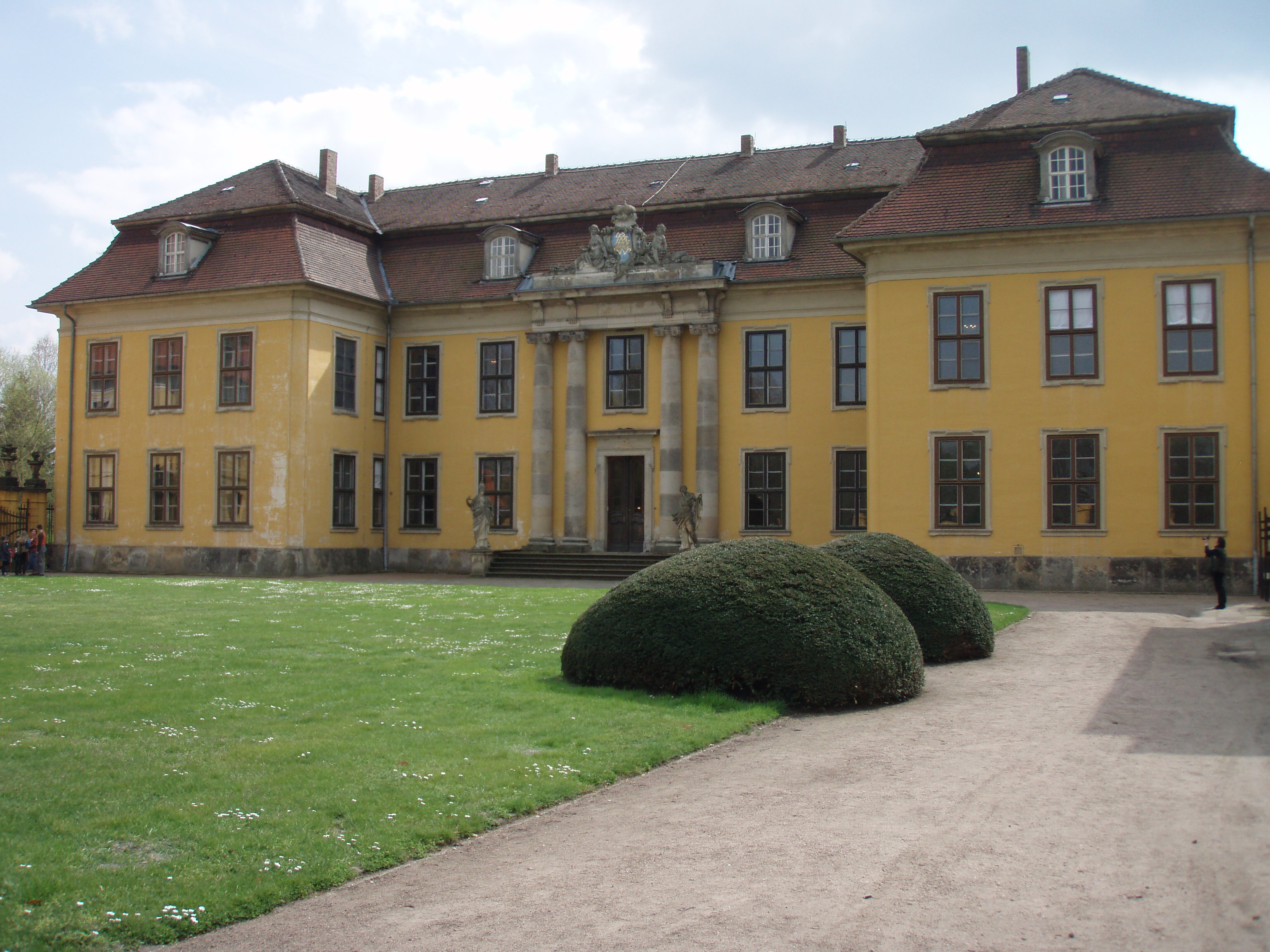
Mosigkau Palace

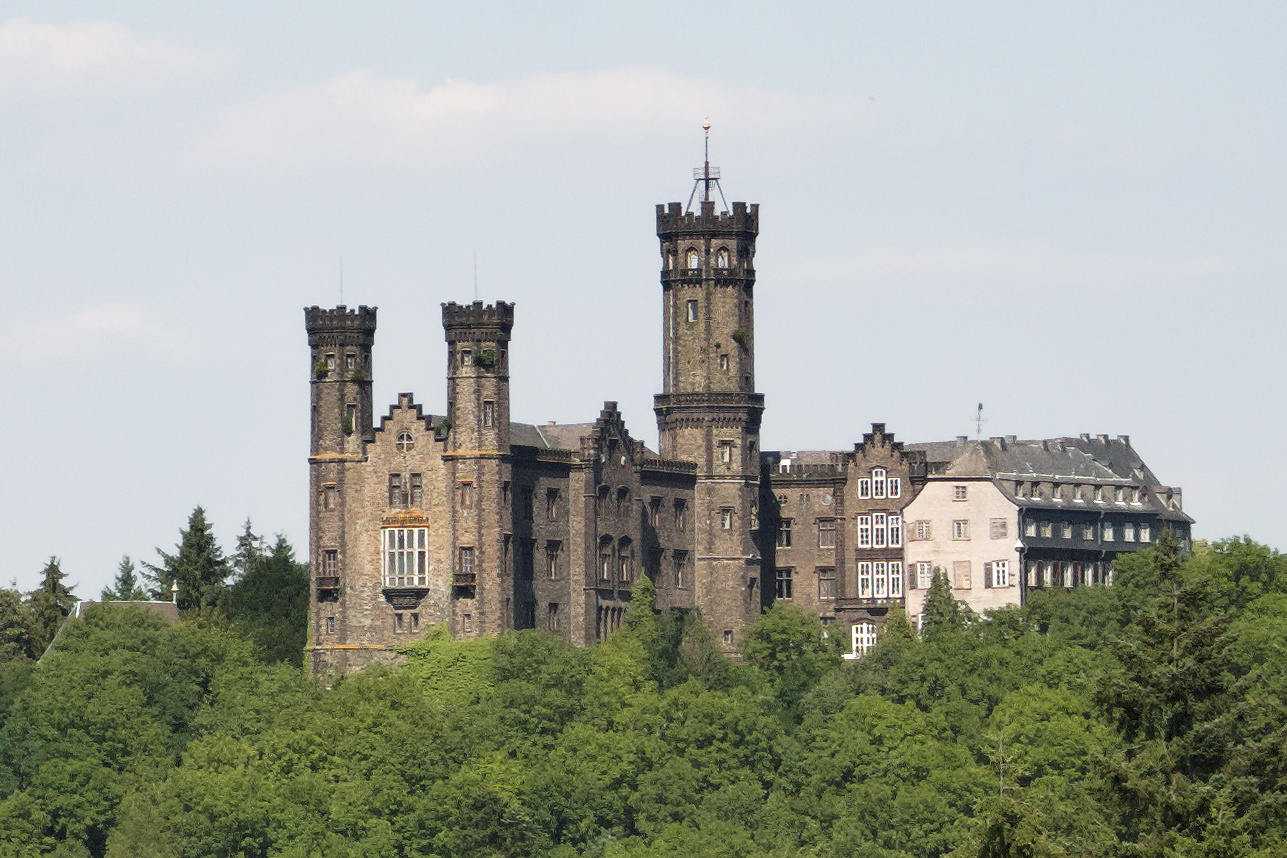
Schaumburg Castle

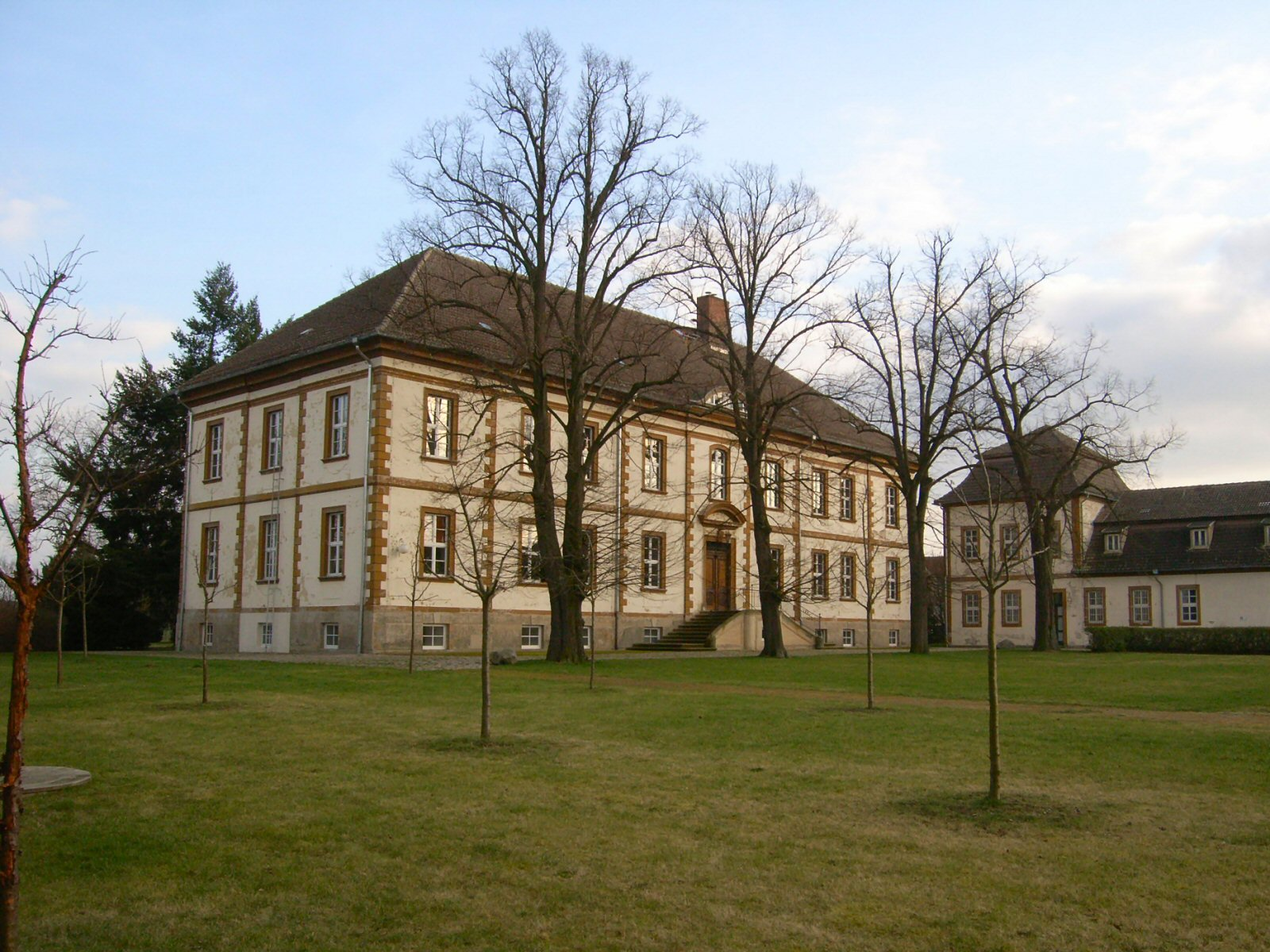
Großkühnau Palace

== Name bearers through adult adoption ==
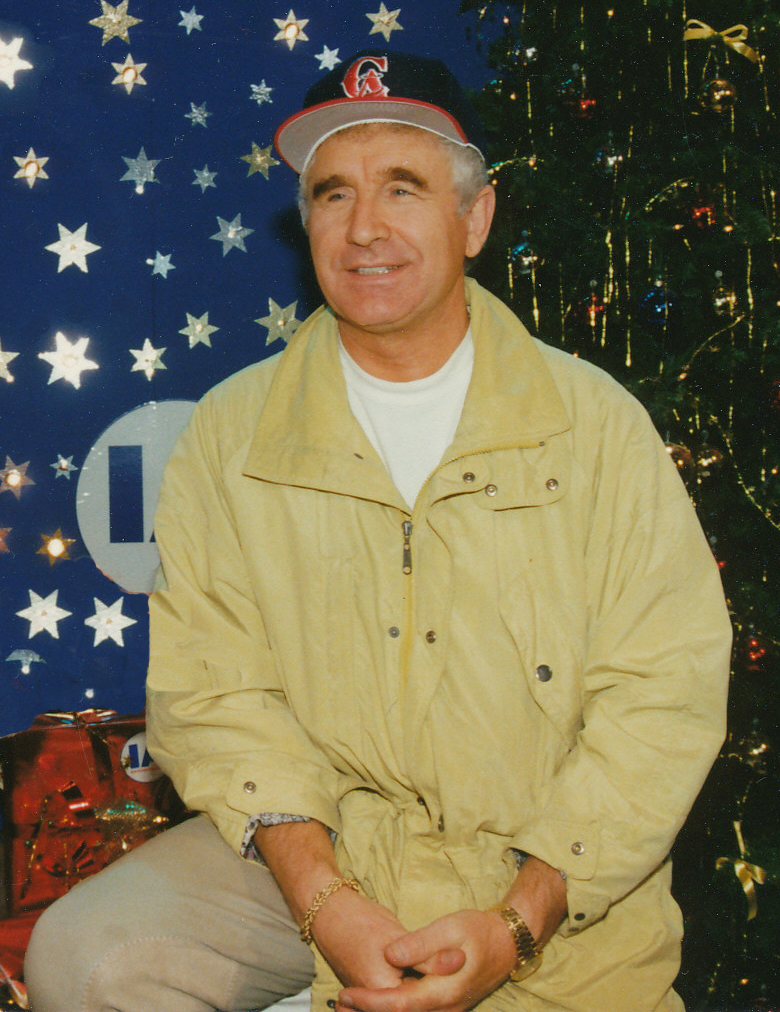
Frédéric, Prince of Anhalt

In addition to those born into the Ascanian family, there are a significant number of individuals adopted as adults who bear the name. The number of adopted individuals and their family members with the same surname far exceeds that of born Ascanians. Among the adoptees, Frédéric, Prince of Anhalt, adopted in 1980 in Germany by Marie-Auguste, Princess of Anhalt, is particularly notable. Frédéric, Prince of Anhalt, has adopted six adults in Los Angeles, who thereby bear the name Prince of Anhalt. The head of the Ascanian family, Eduard, Prince of Anhalt, generally rejects such adult adoptions and does not consider the adoptees part of the family.

Adult adoption in Germany differs from the adoption of a minor in that, per § 1770(1) of the BGB, only a kinship relationship with the adopting person is established, not with their family. Typically, the kinship with biological parents remains intact. In the U.S. state of California, adult adoption is straightforward, and, as in Germany, a personal relationship between the parties is required.

== Bibliography ==
- Anhaltischer Heimatbund e.V.: 800 Jahre Anhalt: Geschichte, Kultur, Perspektiven [800 Years of Anhalt: History, Culture, Perspectives]. Dößel 2012.
- Genealogisches Handbuch des Adels (GHdA) Fürstl. Häuser XIX (2011)
- Lorenz Friedrich Beck: Herrschaft und Territorium der Herzöge von Sachsen-Wittenberg (1212–1422) [Rule and Territory of the Dukes of Saxony-Wittenberg (1212–1422)] (=Bibliothek der Brandenburgischen und Preußischen Geschichte. Volume 6). Potsdam 2000.
- Werner Freitag, Michael Hecht (eds.): Die Fürsten von Anhalt. Herrschaftssymbolik, dynastische Vernunft und politische Konzepte in Spätmittelalter und Früher Neuzeit [The Princes of Anhalt. Symbolism of Rule, Dynastic Reason, and Political Concepts in the Late Middle Ages and Early Modern Period]. Halle 2009, ISBN 978-3-89812-199-6.
- Thomas Gehrlein: Das Haus Anhalt-Askanien mit seinen Linien Bernburg, Dessau, Köthen, Plötzkau und Zerbst: 1000 Jahre Gesamtgeschichte mit Stammfolgen [The House of Anhalt-Ascanians with its Lines Bernburg, Dessau, Köthen, Plötzkau, and Zerbst: 1000 Years of Comprehensive History with Genealogies]. Werl 2017.
- Michael Hecht: Die Erfindung der Askanier. Dynastische Erinnerungsstiftung der Fürsten von Anhalt an der Wende vom Mittelalter zur Neuzeit [The Invention of the Ascanians. Dynastic Memory Foundation of the Princes of Anhalt at the Transition from the Middle Ages to the Early Modern Period]. In: Zeitschrift für historische Forschung. Volume 33, 2006, pp. 1–32.
- Gerd Heinrich (1980). "Ascanians". Lexikon des Mittelalters, I: Aachen bis Bettelordenskirchen (in German). Stuttgart and Weimar: J. B. Metzler. col. 1109–1112. ISBN 3-7608-8901-8.
- Britta Kägler, Michael Hecht: Dynastien und Hochadel: Die anhaltischen Askanier / Die bayerischen Wittelsbacher [Dynasties and High Nobility: The Anhalt Ascanians / The Bavarian Wittelsbachers]. In: Werner Freitag, Michael Kißener, Christine Reinle, Sabine Ullmann (eds.): Handbuch Landesgeschichte [Handbook of Regional History]. Berlin 2018, pp. 268–302.
- Walter Leisering: Zur Geschichte der Askanier. Ein Tabellenbuch mit 200 Abbildungen und historischen Anhalt-Karten [On the History of the Ascanians. A Table Book with 200 Illustrations and Historical Anhalt Maps]. Dessau 1998.
- Jörg Meyn: Vom spätmittelalterlichen Gebietsherzogtum zum frühneuzeitlichen "Territorialstaat". Das askanische Herzogtum Sachsen 1180–1543 [From the Late Medieval Territorial Duchy to the Early Modern "Territorial State". The Ascanian Duchy of Saxony 1180–1543] (=Schriftenreihe der Stiftung Herzogtum Lauenburg. Volume 20). Hamburg 1995.
- Lutz Partenheimer: Albrecht der Bär. Gründer der Mark Brandenburg und des Fürstentums Anhalt [Albert the Bear. Founder of the Margraviate of Brandenburg and the Principality of Anhalt]. 2nd edition. Böhlau, Köln / Weimar / Wien 2003, ISBN 3-412-16302-3.
- Lutz Partenheimer and Moritz Niens: Die Chronik der Markgrafen von Brandenburg (aus dem Hause der Askanier, 13. Jahrhundert) [The Chronicle of the Margraves of Brandenburg (from the House of the Ascanians, 13th Century)]. Nach der Edition Georg Sellos (1888) Latin-German. Becker, Potsdam 2022, Paperback: ISBN 978-3-88372-391-4 (Black-and-white reproductions of the two surviving 14th-century manuscripts), Hardcover: ISBN 978-3-88372-387-7 (Color reproductions of the two surviving 14th-century manuscripts).
- Ralf Regener: Der Sturz der Askanier 1918 in Anhalt. Bedingungen, Verlauf und Nachwirkungen des Untergangs einer kleinstaatlichen deutschen Monarchie [The Fall of the Ascanians 1918 in Anhalt. Conditions, Course, and Aftermath of the Collapse of a Small German Monarchy]. Dessau-Roßlau 2013.
- Mathias Tullner: Geschichte Sachsen-Anhalts [History of Saxony-Anhalt]. Beck, München 2008, ISBN 978-3-406-57286-9.
- Hermann Wäschke: Die Askanier in Anhalt: Genealogisches Handbuch [The Ascanians in Anhalt: Genealogical Handbook]. Dessau 1904.
