= Bertha von Suttner =

Austrian novelist and pacifist (1843–1914)

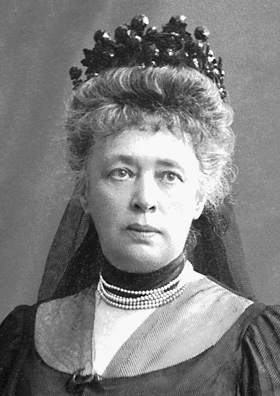
- Suttner, c. 1906
- Born: Bertha Sophie Felicitas Gräfin Kinsky von Wchinitz und Tettau; 9 June 1843; Prague, Kingdom of Bohemia, Austrian Empire
- Died: 21 June 1914 (aged 71); Vienna, Austria-Hungary
- Occupations: Pacifist, novelist
- Spouse: Arthur Gundaccar von Suttner
- Awards: Nobel Peace Prize, 1905

Signature
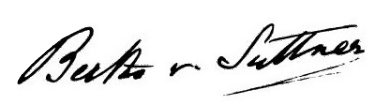

Baroness Bertha Sophie Felicitas von Suttner (Austrian German: [ˈbɛrtaː fɔn ˈzʊtnɐ]; née Countess Kinsky von Wchinitz und Tettau; 9 June 1843 – 21 June 1914) was an Austrian noblewoman, pacifist and novelist. In 1905, she became the second female Nobel laureate (after Marie Curie in 1903), the first woman to be awarded the Nobel Peace Prize, and the first Austrian laureate.

== Early life ==
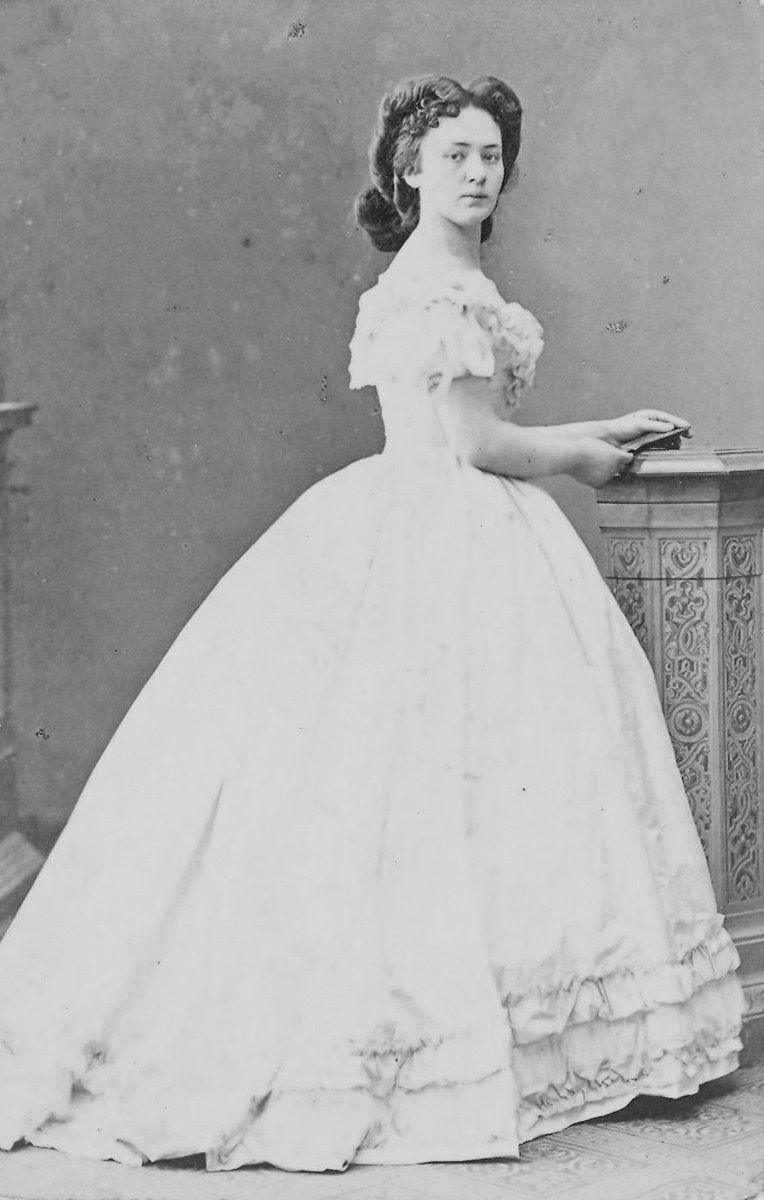
Photograph of Countess Bertha Sophie Felicitas Kinsky von Wchinitz und Tettau in her youth (1873)

Bertha Kinsky was born on 9 June 1843 at Kinský Palace in the Obecní dvůr (cz) district of Prague. Her parents were the Austrian Lieutenant general (German: Feldmarschall-Leutnant) Franz Michael de Paula Josef Graf Kinsky von Wchinitz und Tettau (1769–1843), who died at the age of 75 before Bertha was born, and Sophie Wilhelmine von Körner (1815–1884), who was more than 45 years younger than her husband.

Her father was a member of the ancient and illustrious House of Kinsky via descent from Count Wilhelm Kinsky (1574–1634), being the younger son of Count Franz Ferdinand Kinsky von Wchinitz und Tettau (1738–1806) and his wife, Princess Maria Christina Anna von und zu Liechtenstein (1741–1819), youngest but one daughter of Prince Emanuel of Liechtenstein. Bertha's mother came from a family that belonged to an untitled nobility of significantly lower status, their patent of nobility being of comparatively recent date. She was the daughter of Joseph von Körner, a captain of the cavalry in the Habsburg Imperial Army, and a distant relative of the poet Theodor Körner. Through her mother, Bertha was also related to Theodor Körner, Edler von Siegringen, namesake and great-nephew of the poet, who later served as the 4th President of Austria.

Bertha faced exclusion from the Austrian high nobility due to her "mixed" descent; for instance, only those with an unblemished aristocratic pedigree going back to their great-great-grandparents were eligible for presentation at the imperial court. She was additionally disadvantaged because her father, as a third son, had no great estates or other financial resources to bequeath. Bertha was baptised at Prague's Church of Our Lady of the Snows – not a traditional choice for the aristocracy.

Soon after Bertha's birth, her mother moved to live in Brno near Bertha's guardian, Landgrave Friedrich Michael zu Fürstenberg-Taikowitz (1793–1866). Bertha's older brother, Count Arthur Franz Kinsky von Wchinitz und Tettau (1827–1906), was sent to a military school at the age of six and subsequently had little contact with the family. In 1855, Bertha's maternal aunt Charlotte (Lotte) Büschel, née von Körner (also a widow), and her daughter Elvira joined the household. Elvira's father had been a private scholar and her official guardian, after the death of her father, became Count Johann Carl August von Huyn (1812-1889). She was of a similar age as Bertha and interested in intellectual pursuits, introducing her cousin to literature and philosophy. In addition to such studies, Bertha gained proficiency in French, Italian and English as an adolescent under the supervision of a succession of private tutors. She also became an accomplished amateur pianist and singer.

Bertha's mother and aunt, regarding themselves as clairvoyant, went to gamble at Wiesbaden in the summer of 1856, hoping to return with a fortune. Their losses proved so heavy that they were forced to move to Vienna. During this trip, Bertha received a marriage proposal from Prince Philipp zu Sayn-Wittgenstein-Berleburg (1836–1858), third son of Prince August Ludwig zu Sayn-Wittgenstein-Berleburg, Minister of State of the Duchy of Nassau and his wife, Franziska Allesina genannt von Schweitzer (1802–1878), which was declined due to Bertha's young age. The family once again returned to Wiesbaden in 1859. The second trip proved similarly unsuccessful, and they had to relocate to a small property in Klosterneuburg. Shortly afterwards, Bertha wrote her first published work, the novella Erdenträume im Monde, which appeared in Die Deutsche Frau. Continuing poor financial circumstances led Bertha to a brief engagement to the wealthy Gustav, Baron Heine von Geldern, 31 years her senior and a member of the banking Heine family, whom she came to find unattractive and finally rejected. Her memoirs record her disgusted response to the older man's attempt to kiss her.

In 1864, the family spent the summer at Bad Homburg, a fashionable gambling destination among the aristocracy of the era. Bertha befriended the Georgian aristocrat Ekaterine Dadiani, Princess of Mingrelia and met Tsar Alexander II, to whom she was very distantly related. Seeking a career as an opera singer as an alternative to marrying into money, she undertook an intensive course of lessons, working on her voice for over four hours a day. Despite tuition from the eminent Gilbert Duprez in Paris in 1867 and from Pauline Viardot in Baden-Baden in 1868, she never secured a professional engagement. She suffered from stage fright and was unable to project well in performance. In the summer of 1872, she became engaged to Prince Adolf Karl Franz zu Sayn-Wittgenstein-Hohenstein (1839–1872), fifth son of Prince Alexander zu Sayn-Wittgenstein-Hohenstein (1801–1874) and his wife, Countess Amalie Luise von Bentheim-Tecklenburg-Rheda (1802–1887). However, Prince Adolf died at sea that October while travelling to America to escape his debts.

== Tutor in the Suttner household, life in Georgia ==
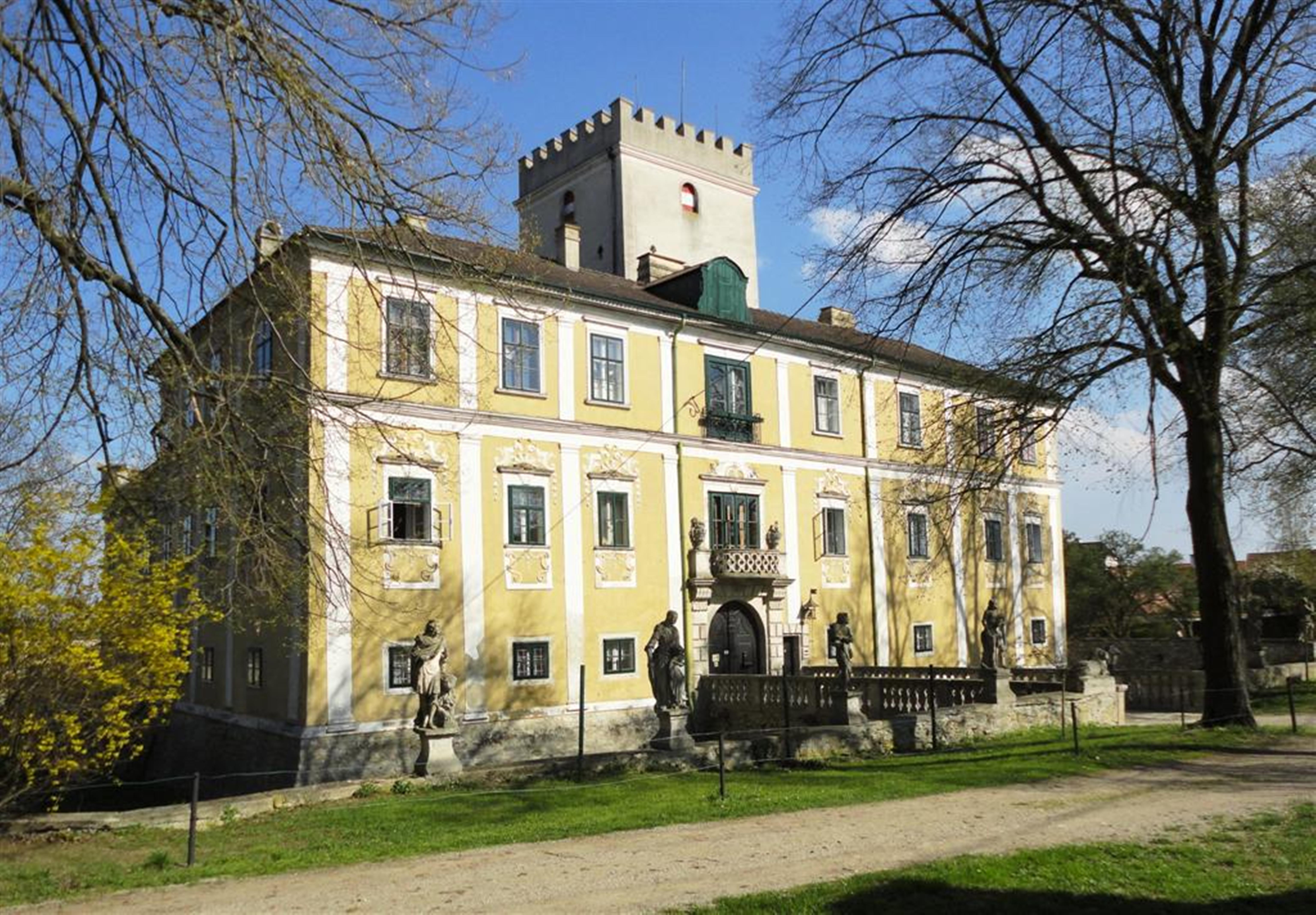
Schloss Harmannsdorf, Austria

In 1866 both Landgrave Fürstenberg (Bertha's guardian) and Elvira died, and Bertha (now at age 23, above the typical age of marriage) felt increasingly constrained by her mother's eccentricity and the family's poor financial circumstances.

In 1873, she found employment as a tutor at the house of Karl Gundaccar Freiherr von Suttner (1819–1898) and his wife, Karola Knolz (b. 1822). They had seven children, including four girls (all then aged 15 to 20). The Suttner family lived in the Innere Stadt of Vienna three seasons of the year, and spent the summer at Castle Harmannsdorf in Lower Austria, at that time part of the Austro-Hungarian Empire.

Bertha became companion to the four girls and had an affectionate relationship with her four young students, who nicknamed her "Boulotte" (fatty) due to her size, a name she would later adopt as a literary pseudonym in the form "B. Oulot".

She soon fell in love with the youngest son of Karl, seven years her junior, Baron Arthur Gundaccar von Suttner (1850–1902). They were engaged but unable to marry due to his parents' disapproval. In 1876, with the encouragement of her employers, she answered a newspaper advertisement which led to her briefly becoming secretary and housekeeper to Alfred Nobel in Paris. In the few weeks of her employment, she and Nobel developed a friendship, and Nobel may have made romantic overtures. However, she remained committed to Arthur and returned shortly to Vienna to marry him in secrecy, in the church of St. Aegyd in Gumpendorf. As a consequence Arthur von Suttner was desinherited by his family.

The newlywed couple eloped to Mingrelia in western Georgia, Russian Empire, near the Black Sea, where she hoped to make use of her connection to the former ruling House of Dadiani and Ekaterine, who had once invited her to visit. On their arrival, they were entertained by Prince Niko. The couple settled in Kutaisi, where they found work teaching languages and music to the children of the local aristocracy. However, they experienced considerable hardship despite their social connections, living in a simple three-roomed wooden house. Their situation worsened in 1877 on the outbreak of the Russo-Turkish War, although Arthur worked as a reporter on the conflict for the Neue Freie Presse. Suttner also wrote frequently for the Austrian press in this period and worked on her early novels, including Es Löwos, a romanticised account of her life with Arthur. In the aftermath of the war, Arthur attempted to set up a timber business, but it was unsuccessful.

== Arthur and Bertha von Suttner ==
Arthur and Bertha von Suttner were largely socially isolated in Georgia; their poverty restricted their engagement with high society, and neither ever became fluent speakers of Mingrelian or Georgian. To support themselves, both began writing as a career. While Arthur's writing during this period is dominated by local themes, Suttner's was not similarly influenced by Georgian culture.

In August 1882, Ekaterine Dadiani died. Soon afterwards, the couple decided to leave Mingrelia and move to Tbilisi. There, Arthur took whatever work he could (in accounting, construction and wallpaper design), while Suttner largely concentrated on her writing. She became a correspondent of the German writer and philosopher Michael Georg Conrad, she eventually contributed an article to the 1885 edition of his publication Die Gesellschaft. The piece, entitled "Truth and Lies", is a polemic in favour of the naturalism of Émile Zola. Her first significant political work, Inventarium einer Seele ("Inventory of the Soul"), was published in Leipzig in 1883. In this work, Suttner takes a pro-disarmament, progressive stance, arguing for the inevitability of world peace due to technological advancement; a possibility also considered by her friend Nobel due to the increasingly deterrent effect of more powerful weapons.

In 1884, Suttner's mother died, leaving the couple with further debts. Arthur had befriended a Georgian journalist in Tbilisi only known as "M" (Note: Suttner could not recall the journalist's full name when writing her memoirs, and his identity remains unknown.) and the couple agreed to collaborate with him on a translation of the Georgian epic The Knight in the Panther Skin. Suttner was to improve M.'s literal translation of the Georgian to French, and Arthur to translate the French to German. This method proved arduous, and they worked only for a few hours each day. Arthur published several articles on the work in the Georgian press, and Mihály Zichy prepared some illustrations for the publication, but M. failed to make the expected payment, and after the Bulgarian Crisis began in 1885 the couple felt increasingly unsafe in Georgian society, which was becoming more hostile to Austrians due to Russian influence. They finally reconciled with Arthur's family and in May 1885 could return to Austria, where the couple lived at Harmannsdorf Castle in Lower Austria.

Bertha found refuge in her marriage with Arthur, of which she remarked that "the third field of my feelings and moods lay within our married happiness. In this was my peculiarly inalienable home, my refuge for all possible conditions of life, […] and so the leaves of my diary are full not only of political domestic records of all kinds, but also of memoranda of our gay little jokes, our confidential enjoyable walks, our uplifting reading, our hours of music together, and our evening games of chess. To us personally nothing could happen. We had each other – that was everything."

== Peace activism ==
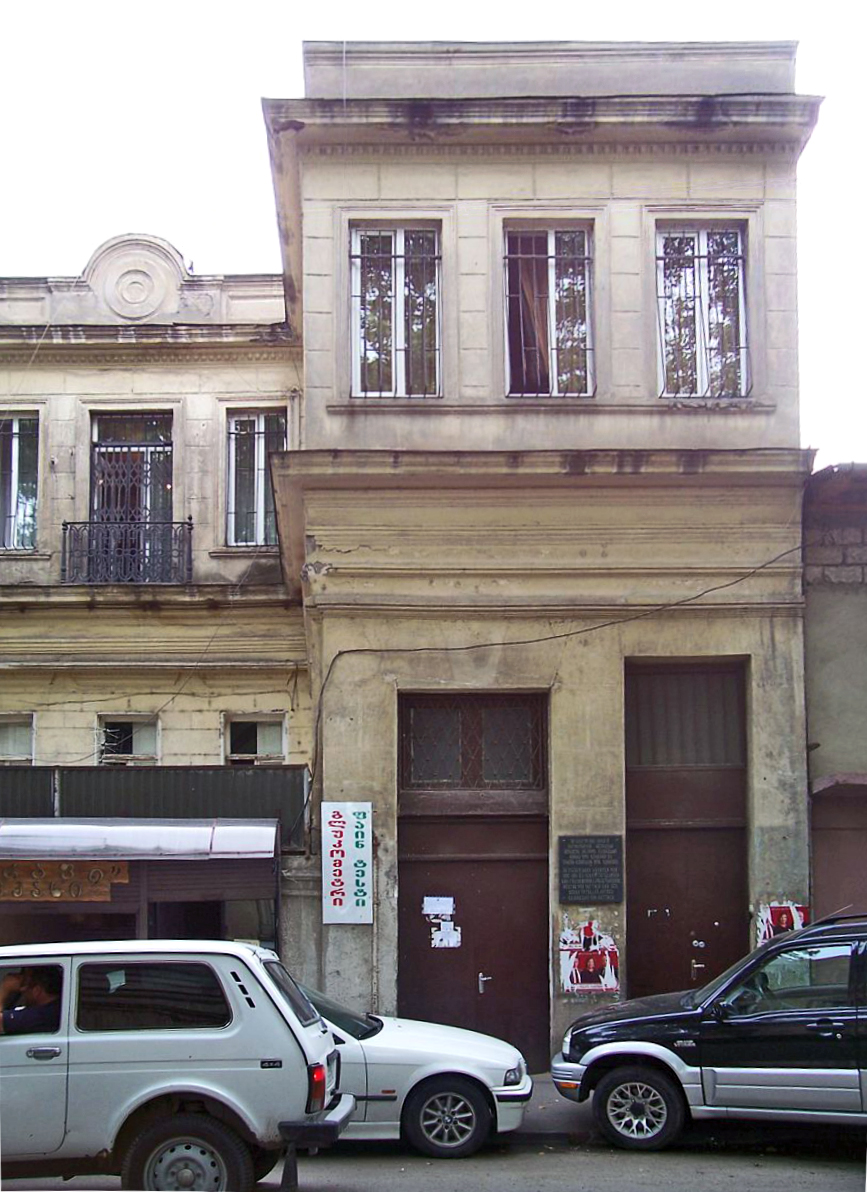
Suttner's residence in Tbilisi

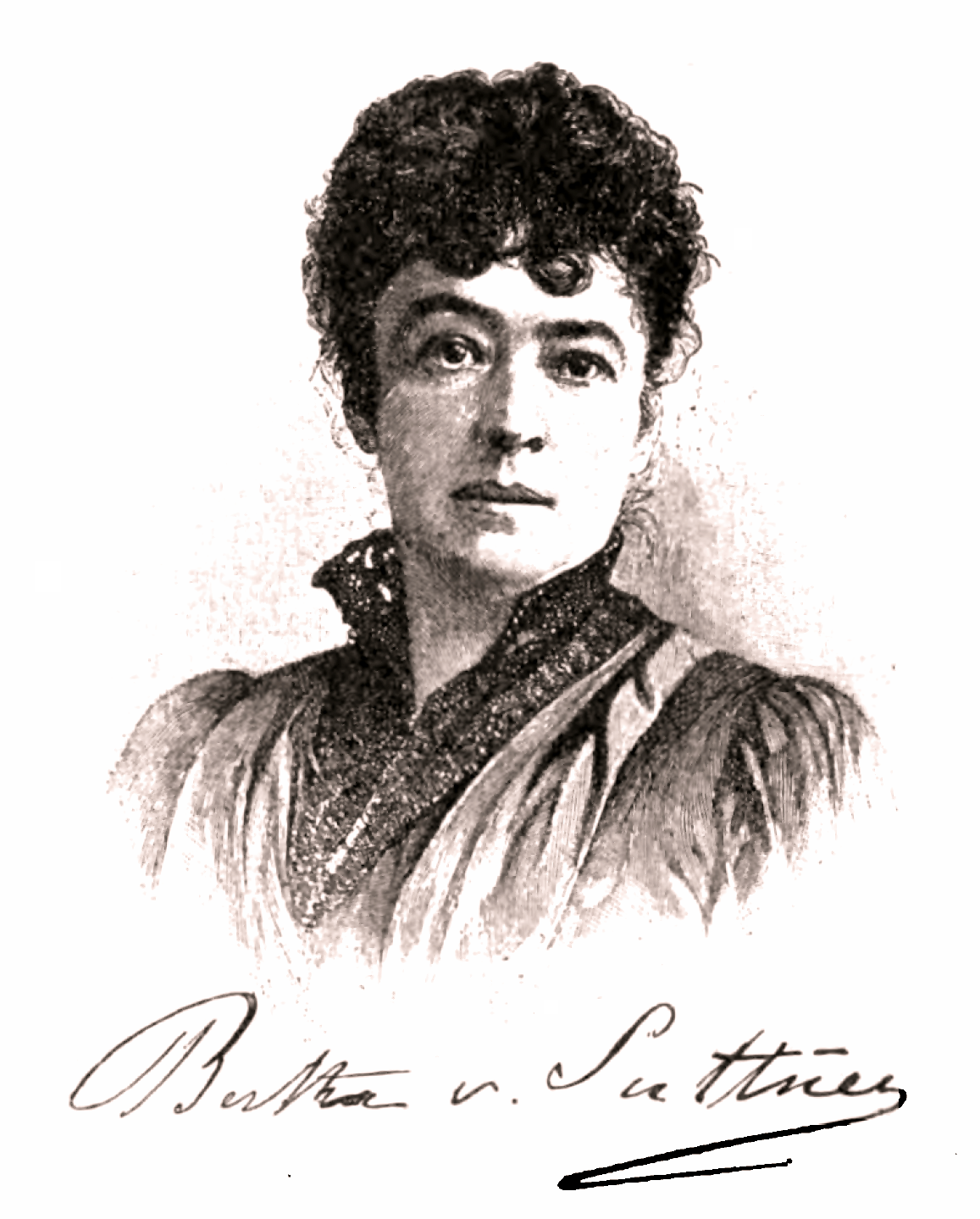
Suttner in 1896

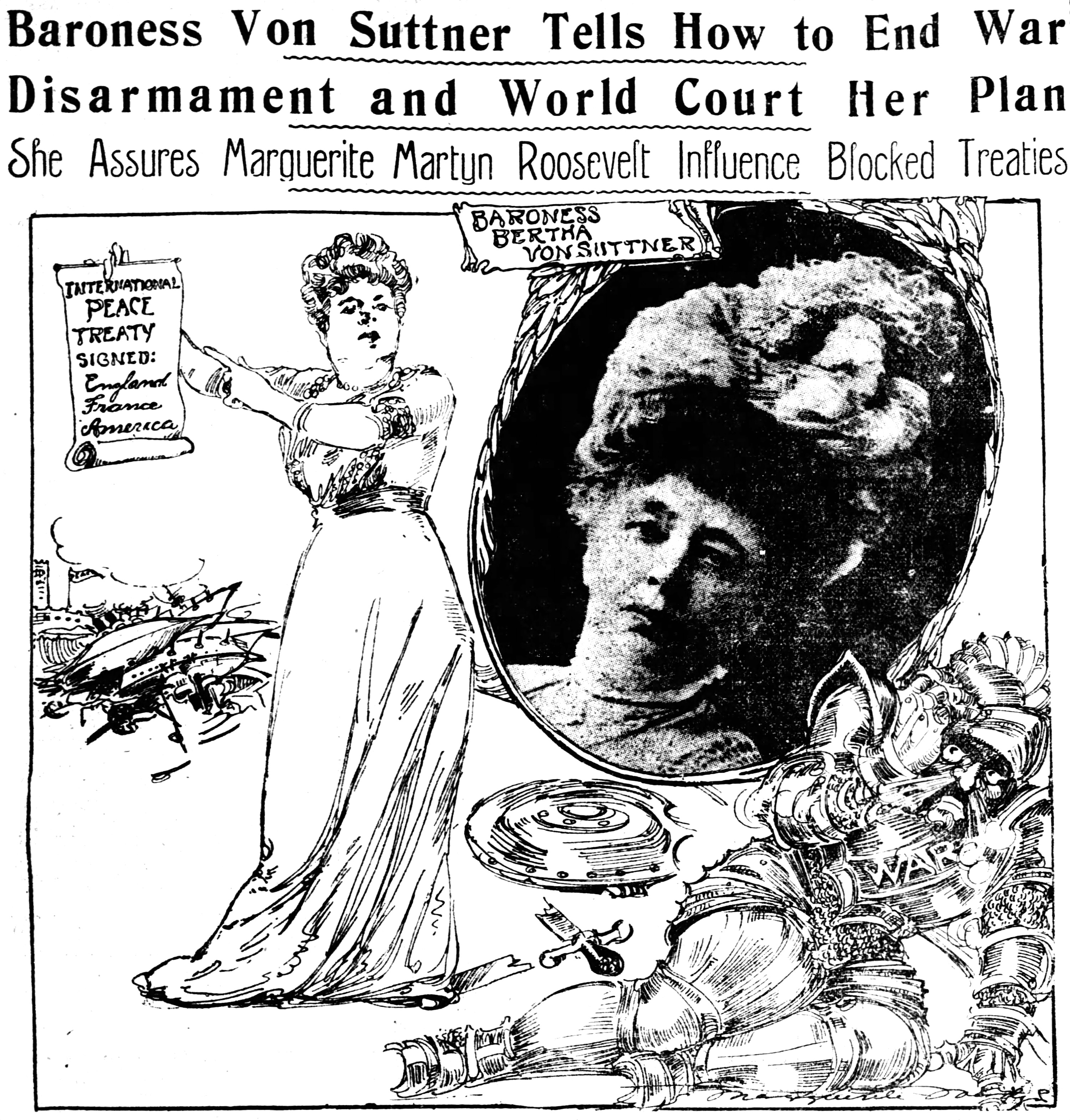
Imaginative drawing by Marguerite Martyn and a photo of Bertha von Suttner, 1912, with a victorious Suttner holding a scroll labeled "International Peace Treaty / England / France / America." In the corner cowers a representation of a defeated warrior labelled "WAR." A broken sword and shield is on the ground. A tangle of broken warships is at the left side. At top are newspaper headlines from the St. Louis Post-Dispatch of 20 October 1912.

After their return to Austria, Suttner continued her journalism and concentrated on peace and war issues, corresponding with the French philosopher Ernest Renan and influenced by the International Arbitration and Peace Association founded by Hodgson Pratt in 1880.

In 1889, Suttner became a leading figure in the peace movement with the publication of her pacifist novel, Die Waffen nieder! (Lay Down Your Arms!), which made her one of the leading figures of the Austrian peace movement. The book was published in 37 editions and translated into 15 languages. She witnessed the foundation of the Inter-Parliamentary Union and called for the establishment of the Austrian Gesellschaft der Friedensfreunde pacifist organisation in an 1891 Neue Freie Presse editorial. Suttner became chairwoman and also founded the German Peace Society the next year. She became known internationally as the editor of the international pacifist journal Die Waffen nieder!, named after her book, from 1892 to 1899. In 1897, she presented Emperor Franz Joseph I with a list of signatures urging the establishment of an International Court of Justice and took part in the First Hague Convention in 1899 with the help of Theodor Herzl, who paid for her trip as a correspondent of the Zionist newspaper, Die Welt.

Upon her husband's death in 1902, Suttner had to sell Harmannsdorf Castle and moved back to Vienna. In 1904 she addressed the International Congress of Women in Berlin and for seven months travelled around the United States, attending a universal peace congress in Boston and meeting President Theodore Roosevelt.

Though her personal contact with Alfred Nobel had been brief, she corresponded with him until his death in 1896, and it is believed that Von Suttner was a major influence on his decision to include a peace prize among those prizes provided in his will. Bertha von Suttner was awarded the Nobel Peace Prize on 10 December 1905. The presentation took place on 18 April 1906 in Kristiania, what is now Oslo, Norway.

In 1907, Von Suttner was the only woman to attend the Second Hague Peace Conference, which mainly pertained to the law of war. Von Suttner was actually highly critical of the 1907 conference and warned of a war to come. When she accepted her Nobel Peace prize a year earlier, she had said: "(…) whether our Europe will become a showpiece of ruins and failure, or whether we can avoid this danger and so enter sooner the coming era of secure peace and law in which a civilisation of unimagined glory will develop. The many aspects of this question are what the second Hague Conference should be discussing rather than the proposed topics concerning the laws and practices of war at sea, the bombardment of ports, towns, and villages, the laying of mines, and so on. The contents of this agenda demonstrate that, although the supporters of the existing structure of society, which accepts war, come to a peace conference prepared to modify the nature of war, they are basically trying to keep the present system intact".

Around this time, she also crossed paths with Anna Bernhardine Eckstein, another German champion of world peace, who influenced the agenda of the Second Hague Peace Conference. A year later she attended the International Peace Congress in London, where she first met Caroline Playne, an English anti-war activist who would later write the first biography of Suttner.

In the run-up to World War I, Suttner continued to campaign against international armament. In 1911 she became a member of the advisory council of the Carnegie Peace Foundation. In the last months of her life, while suffering from cancer, she helped organise the next Peace Conference, intended to take place in September 1914. However, the conference never took place, as she died of cancer on 21 June 1914, and seven days later the heir to her nation's throne, Franz Ferdinand was killed, triggering World War I.

Suttner's pacifism was influenced by the writings of Immanuel Kant, Henry Thomas Buckle, Herbert Spencer, Charles Darwin and Leo Tolstoy (Tolstoy praised Die Waffen nieder!) conceiving peace as a natural state impaired by the human aberrances of war and militarism. As a result, she argued that a right to peace could be demanded under international law and was necessary in the context of an evolutionary Darwinist conception of history. Suttner was a respected journalist, with one historian describing her as "a most perceptive and adept political commentator".

== Writing ==
To promote her writing career and ideals, she used her connections in aristocracy and friendships with wealthy individuals, such as Alfred Nobel, to gain access to international heads of state, and also to gain popularity for her writing. To increase the financial success of her writing, she used a male pseudonym early in her career. In addition, Suttner often worked as a journalist to publicise her message or promote her own books, events, and causes.

As Tolstoy noted and others have since agreed, there is a strong similarity between Suttner and Harriet Beecher Stowe. Both Beecher Stowe and Suttner "were neither simply writers of popular entertainment nor authors of tendentious propaganda.... [They] used entertainment for idealistic purposes." For Suttner, peace and acceptance of all individuals and all peoples was the greatest ideal and theme.

Suttner also wrote about other issues and ideals. Two common issues in her work, apart from pacifism, are religion and gender equality.

=== Religion ===
There are two main issues with religion that Suttner often wrote about. She had a disdain for the spectacle and pomp of some religious practices. In a scene in Lay Down Your Arms she highlighted the odd theatricality of some religious practices. In the scene, the emperor and empress are washing the feet of normal citizens to show they are as humble as Jesus, but they invite everyone to witness their show of humility and enter the hall in a dramatic fashion. The protagonist Martha remarks that it was "indeed a sham washing."

Another issue prominent in much of her writing is the idea that war is righteously for God, and leaders often use religion as a pretext for war. Suttner criticised this reasoning on the grounds that it placed the state as the important entity to God rather than the individual, thereby making dying in battle more glorious than other forms of death or surviving a war. Much of Lay Down Your Arms discusses this topic.

This type of religious thinking also leads to segregation and fighting based on religious differences, which Bertha and Arthur von Suttner refused to accept. As a devout Christian, Arthur founded the League Against Anti-Semitism in response to the pogroms in Eastern Europe and the growing antisemitism across Europe. The Suttner family called for acceptance of all people and all faiths, with Suttner writing in her memoirs that "religion was neighbourly love, not neighbourly hatred. Any kind of hatred, against other nations or against other creeds, detracted from the humaneness of humanity."

=== Gender equality ===
Suttner is often considered a leader in the women's liberation movement.

Von Suttner broke through sex barriers by her work as a writer and activist. She was an outspoken leader in a society in which women were to be seen, not be heard. But she did not actively participate in the movements for women's suffrage, for instance, which she explained due to a lack of time. She instead focused on reaching out to other women in the international peace movement, though she kept close contact to the women's suffrage movement. As a sign of joint solidarity, for instance, Von Suttner was a prominent participant of the 1904 "International Women's Conference" ("Internationale Frauen-Kongress") in Berlin. Von Suttner knew, though, that conflict can only be avoided if both men and women together struggle for peace, which required an absolute belief in sex equality. "The tasks involved in mankind's continuing ennoblement are such that they can only be fulfilled through fair and equal cooperation between the sexes", she wrote.

In Lay Down Your Arms, the protagonist Martha often clashes with her father on this issue. Martha does not want her son to play with toy soldiers and be indoctrinated to the masculine ideas of war. Martha's father attempts to put Martha back in the female sexed box by suggesting that the son will not need to ask for approval from a woman, and also states that Martha should marry again because women her age should not be alone.

This was not simply because she insisted that women are equal to men, but that she was able to tease out how sexism affects both men and women. Like Martha being placed in a female structured sex box, the character of Tilling is also placed in the male stereotyped box and affected by that. The character even discusses it, saying, "we men have to repress the instinct of self-preservation. Soldiers have also to repress the compassion, the sympathy for the gigantic trouble which invades both friend and foe; for next to cowardice, what is most disgraceful to us is all sentimentality, all that is emotional."

== Death ==
Shortly before the outbreak of the First World War, Bertha von Suttner died in Vienna on 21 June 1914. As early as 1907, she stipulated in her will that after her death her body was to be transferred to the German city of Gotha for cremation, and that her urn containing her ashes was to remain in Gotha. Her ashes were placed in the local columbarium.

The city of Gotha honours her memory through the street names Bertha-von-Suttner-Platz and Bertha-von-Suttner-Straße.

== Legacy ==
Suttner's work proved very influential for those involved in the peace movement.

- She was awarded the Nobel Peace Prize in 1905

She has also been commemorated on several coins and stamps:

- She was selected as a main motif for a high value collectors' coin: the 2008 Europe Taler, which featured important people in the history of Europe. Also depicted in the coin are Martin Luther, Antonio Vivaldi, and James Watt.
- A commemorative silver 10 euro coin was issued in Germany in honor of the centennial of her Nobel Prize.
- She is depicted on the Austrian 2 euro coin, and was pictured on the old Austrian 1,000 schilling bank note.
- She was commemorated on a 1965 Austrian postage stamp, a 2005 German postage stamp and a 2013 Czech postage stamp.
- On 10 December 2019, Google celebrated her with a Google Doodle.
- There is a statue in her honor in Vienna and one in Graz.

In 2025, the European Central Bank announced two options to choose from in an online vote or a future redesign of Euro banknotes: one featuring "European culture" and the other "Rivers and birds". Suttner will appear on the obverse of 200 euro banknotes if the "European culture" theme is selected.

== On film ==
- Die Waffen nieder, by Holger Madsen and Carl Theodor Dreyer. Released by Nordisk Films Kompagni in 1914.
- No Greater Love (German: Herz der Welt), a 1952 film has Bertha as the main character.

=== Television ===
- Madame Nobel (Eine Liebe für den Frieden – Bertha von Suttner und Alfred Nobel), TV biopic, ORF/Degeto/BR 2014, after the play Mr. & Mrs. Nobel by Esther Vilar.

== Works translated into English ==
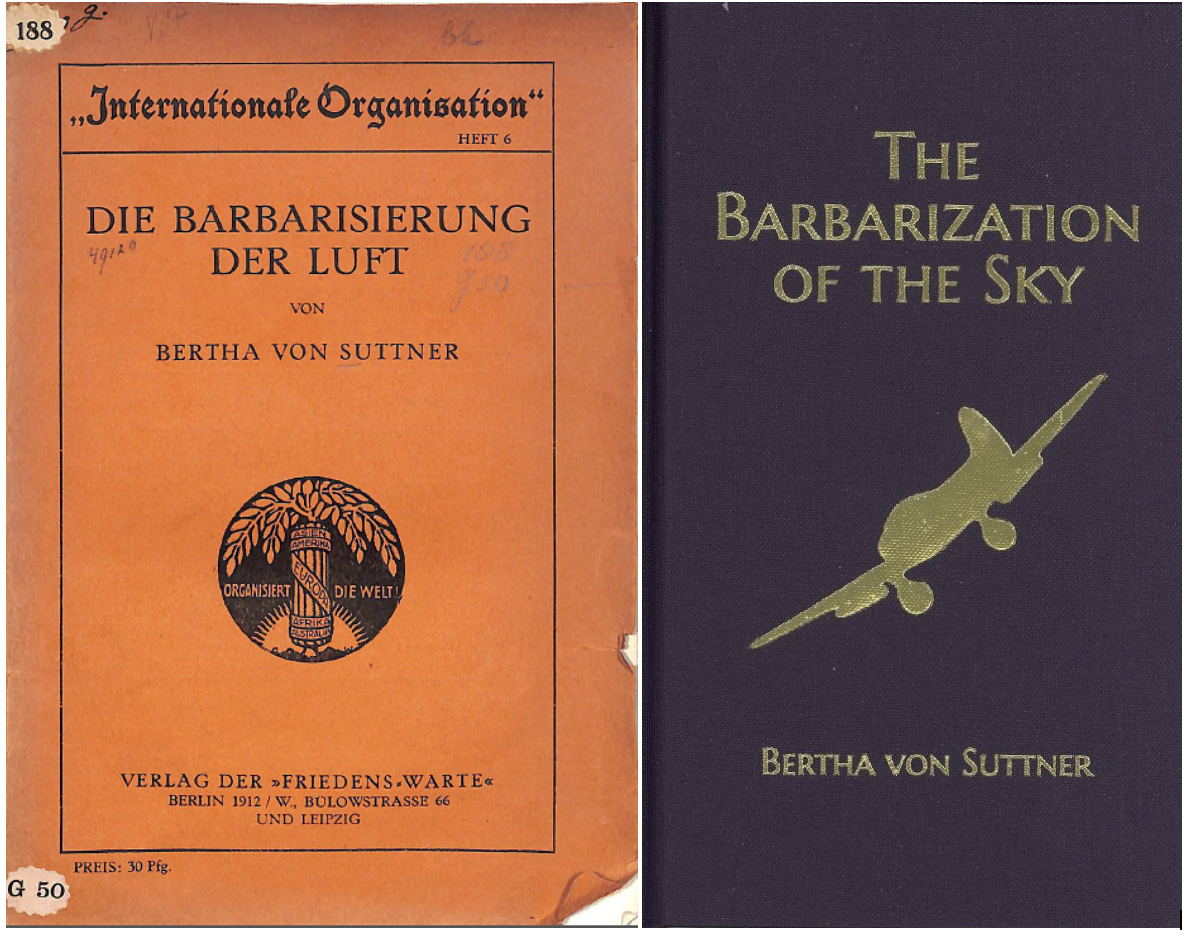
The front covers of Suttner's 1912 essay "Die Barbarisierung der Luft" and its English Translation, published in 2016 by The Bertha von Suttner Project.

- Memoirs of Bertha von Suttner: The Records of an Eventful Life. Vol. 1. Boston; London: Published for the International School of Peace by Ginn and Co. 1910. OCLC 1000449.
- Memoirs of Bertha von Suttner: The Records of an Eventful Life. Vol. 2. Boston; London: Published for the International School of Peace by Ginn and Co. 1910. OCLC 1000449.
- When Thoughts Will Soar: a romance of the immediate future. Boston; New York: Houghton Mifflin Company. 1914. OCLC 975993521.
- Lay Down Your Arms: The autobiography of Martha von Tilling. Translated by Holmes, T. (2nd ed.). New York: Longmans, Green & Co. 1914 [First published 1906]. OCLC 944424434.
- The Barbarization of the Sky. Mount Pleasant, Michigan (USA): The Bertha von Suttner Project. 2016. OCLC 993005782. Archived from the original on 2021-05-17.

== See also ==
- Pacifism
- List of peace activists
- List of Austrians
- List of Austrian writers
- List of female Nobel laureates

== Notes and references ==
=== Bibliography ===
- Chisholm, Hugh, ed. (1911). "Suttner, Bertha, Baroness von" . Encyclopædia Britannica. Vol. 26 (11th ed.). Cambridge University Press. p. 171.
- Playne, Caroline Elizabeth (1936). Bertha von Suttner and the World War. George Allen Unwin.
- Irwin Abrams: "Bertha von Suttner and the Nobel Peace Prize". In Journal of Central European Affairs, Bd. 22, 1962, S. 286–307.
- Kemf, Beatrix (1972). Suffragette for Peace: Life of Bertha Von Suttner. Oswald Wolff. ISBN 978-0854962556.
- Laurence, Richard R. "Bertha von Suttner and the peace movement in Austria to World War I", Austrian History Yearbook, 23 (1992), 181-201.
- Lengyel, Emil (1975). And All Her Paths Were Peace: The Life of Bertha von Suttner. Thomas Nelson, Inc. ISBN 978-0840764508.
- Hamann, Brigitte (1996). Bertha von Suttner – a life for peace. Syracuse University Press. ISBN 978-0815603764.
- Brigitte Hamann: Bertha von Suttner - Ein Leben für den Frieden, Piper, München 2002 ISBN 3-492-23784-3.
- Laurie R. Cohen (Hrsg.): "Gerade weil Sie eine Frau sind…" - Erkundungen über Bertha von Suttner, die unbekannte Friedensnobelpreisträgerin, Braumüller, Wien 2005 ISBN 3-7003-1522-8.
- Maria Enichlmair: Abenteurerin Bertha von Suttner: Die unbekannten Georgien-Jahre 1876 bis 1885, Ed. Roesner, Maria Enzersdorf 2005 ISBN 3-902300-18-3.
- Beatrix Müller-Kampel (Hrsg.): "Krieg ist der Mord auf Kommando". Bürgerliche und anarchistische Friedenskonzepte. Bertha von Suttner und Pierre Ramus, Graswurzelrevolution, Nettersheim 2005 ISBN 3-9806353-7-6.
- Beatrix Kempf: "Bertha von Suttner und die « bürgerliche » Friedensbewegung", In Friede – Fortschritt – Frauen. Friedensnobelpreisträgerin Bertha von Suttner auf Schloss Harmannsdorf, LIT-Verlag, Wien 2007, S. 45 ff.
- Valentin Belentschikow: Bertha von Suttner und Russland (= Vergleichende Studien zu den slavischen Sprachen und Literaturen.). Lang, Frankfurt am Main u.a. 2012 ISBN 978-3-631-63598-8.
- Simone Peter: "Bertha von Suttner (1843–1914)". In Bardo Fassbender, Anne Peters (eds.): The Oxford Handbook of the History of International Law, Oxford University Press, Oxford 2012, S. 1142–1145 (Vorschau).
- Stefan Frankenberger (ed.): Der unbekannte Soldat – Zum Andenken an Bertha von Suttner, Mono, Wien 2014 ISBN 978-3-902727-52-7.
