= Rudolf Hilferding =

Austro-German economist, pediatrician, journalist, Marxist theoretician and politician

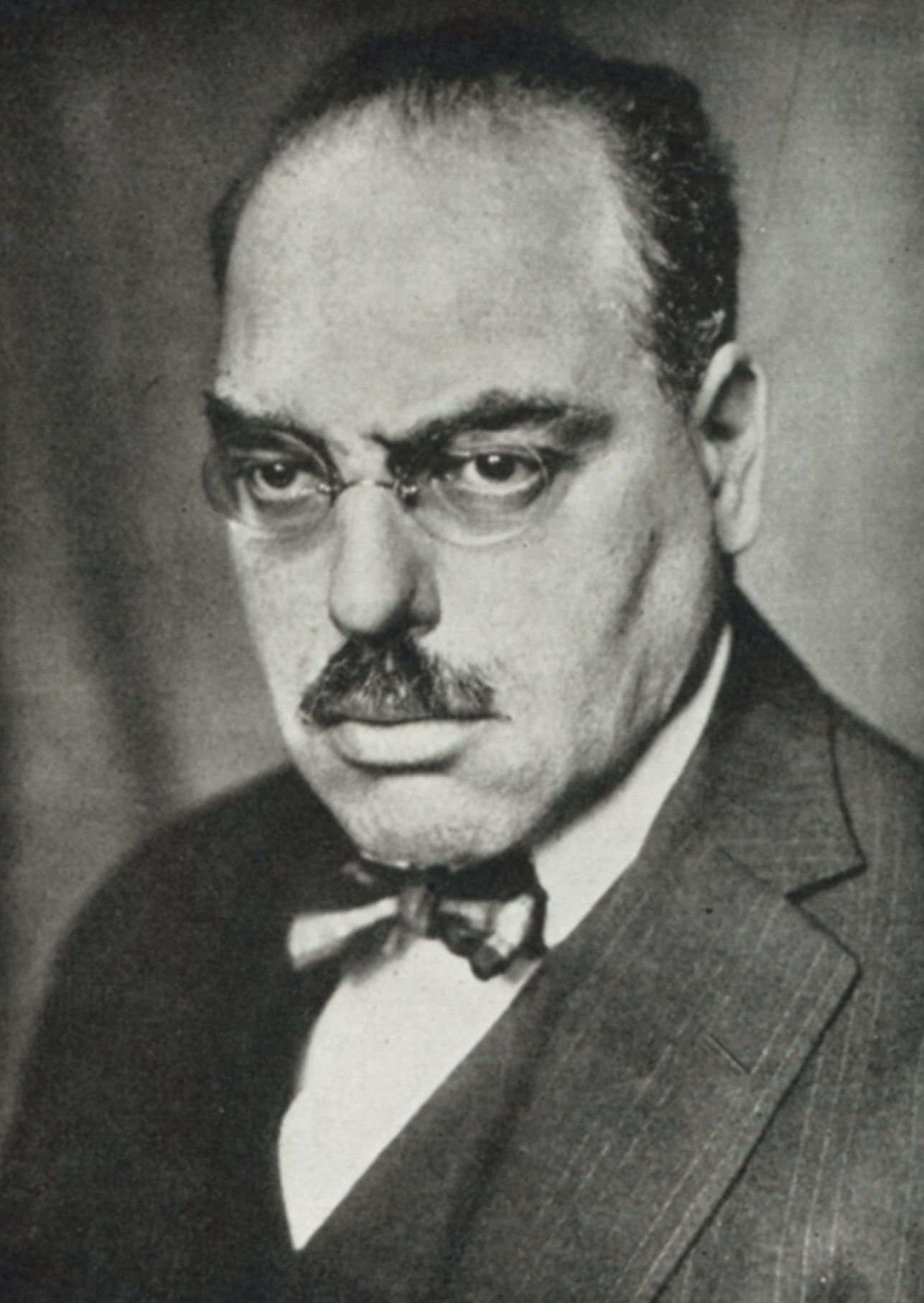
- Hilferding in 1931

Minister of Finance (Weimar Republic)
- In office 29 June 1928 – 21 December 1929
- Preceded by: Heinrich Köhler
- Succeeded by: Paul Moldenhauer
- In office 13 August 1923 – October 1923
- Preceded by: Andreas Hermes
- Succeeded by: Hans Luther

Personal details
- Born: 10 August 1877 Leopoldstadt, Vienna, Austria-Hungary
- Died: 11 February 1941 (aged 63) Paris, German-occupied France
- Party: SPD
- Other political affiliations: USPD (1918–1922)
- Education: University of Vienna
- Occupation: Politician

Rudolf Hilferding (German: [ˈhɪlfɐdɪŋ]; 10 August 1877 – 11 February 1941) was an Austrian-born Marxist economist, socialist theorist, politician and the chief theoretician for the Social Democratic Party of Germany (SPD) during the Weimar Republic, being almost universally recognized as the SPD's foremost theoretician of the twentieth century. He was also a physician.

He was born in Vienna, where he received a doctorate having studied medicine. After becoming a leading journalist for the SPD, he participated in the November Revolution in Germany and was Finance Minister of Germany in 1923 and from 1928 to 1929. In 1933 he fled into exile, living in Zurich and then Paris, where he died in custody of the Gestapo in 1941.

Hilferding was a proponent of the "economic" reading of Karl Marx, identifying with the "Austro-Marxian" group. He was the first to put forward the theory of organized capitalism. He was the main defender of Marxism from critiques by Austrian School economist and fellow Vienna resident Eugen von Böhm-Bawerk. Hilferding also participated in the "Crises Debate" – disputing Marx's theory of the instability and eventual breakdown of capitalism on the basis that the concentration of capital is actually stabilizing. He edited leading publications such as Vorwärts, Die Freiheit, and Die Gesellschaft. His most famous work was Das Finanzkapital (Finance capital), one of the most influential and original contributions to Marxian economics with substantial influence on Marxist writers such as Vladimir Lenin and Nikolai Bukharin influencing his writings on imperialism.

== Biography ==
=== Life in Vienna ===
On 10 August 1877, Rudolf Hilferding was born in Vienna into a prosperous Jewish family, consisting of his parents, Emil Hilferding, a merchant (or private servant), and Anna Hilferding, and of Rudolf's younger sister, Maria. Rudolf attended a public gymnasium from which he graduated as an average student, allowing him access to the university. Directly afterwards, he enrolled at the University of Vienna to study medicine.

Even before his school leaving examinations, in 1893 he joined a group of Vienna students who weekly discussed socialist literature and later formed with young university teachers the student-organization Freie Vereinigung Sozialistischer Studenten, whose chairman was Max Adler. This is where Hilferding first intensely came in contact with socialist theories and first became active in the labour movement. The organization also participated in social-democratic demonstrations, which came in conflict with the police, drawing the attention of the Social Democratic Party of Austria (SPÖ).

As a university student, he became acquainted with many talented socialist intellectuals. Aside from his studies of medicine, he studied history, economy, and philosophy. He and his fellow socialist students and friends Karl Renner, Otto Bauer and Max Adler also studied political economy, taught by the Marxist Carl Grünberg, and attended the lectures of the philosopher Ernst Mach, who both influenced Hilferding significantly. He became one of the staunchest supporters of Victor Adler, founder of the SPÖ.

Having graduated with a doctorate in 1901, he began working in Vienna as a paediatrician, however not with much enthusiasm. He spent much of his leisure time studying political economy, where his real interest lay, but he would not give up his profession until his first publications gave him success. He also joined the Social-Democratic Party in Austria. In 1902 he contributed to the Social-Democratic newspaper Die Neue Zeit on economic subjects as requested by Karl Kautsky, at that time the most important Marxist theoretician worldwide and who developed a long-lasting personal and political friendship with Hilferding. His collaboration with Kautsky and his regular contributions to the Neue Zeit, the leading theory organ of the socialist movement, made him become a mediator between Kautsky and Victor Adler, trying to reduce their ideological differences.

In April 1902, he wrote a review of Eugen von Böhm-Bawerk's Karl Marx and the Close of His System (1896) defending Marx's economic theory against Böhm-Bawerk's criticism. He also wrote two significant essays concerning the use of the general strike as a political weapon. Already in 1905, his numerous publications have made him one of the leading social-democratic theoreticians and brought him into close contact with the party leadership of the SPÖ and of the Social Democratic Party of Germany (SPD). Together with Max Adler, he founded and edited the Marx-Studien, theoretical and political studies spreading Austromarxism until 1923. Karl Renner, Adler and Hilferding founded an association to improve the worker's education, which established Vienna's first school for workers in 1903.

Hilferding married the doctor Margarete Hönigsberg, whom he had met in the socialist movement and who was eight years his senior. She also had a Jewish background, had made her exams at the University of Vienna, and was a regular contributor to Die Neue Zeit. Margarete gave birth to their 1st child, Karl Emil. Kautsky worried that Hilferding, who now complained about his lack of time, would neglect his theoretical work in favor of his good social situation as a doctor in Vienna. Kautsky used his connections to August Bebel, who was looking for teachers for the SPD's training center in Berlin, to suggest Hilferding for this position. In July 1906, Bebel recommended Hilferding for this job to the party executive, which agreed to give it to him for six months.

=== Life in Berlin and World War I ===
In 1906, he gave up his job as a doctor and, following August Bebel's call, started teaching Economics and Economic history at the training center of the SPD in Berlin. Having arrived in Berlin in November 1906, he taught there for one term, but a law forbade the employment of teachers without German citizenship. He had to give up this job and was replaced by Rosa Luxemburg after being threatened with eviction by the Prussian police in 1907.

Until 1915, he was the foreign editor of the leading SPD newspaper Vorwärts, in the immediate proximity of the most important party leaders. Bebel had recommended Hilferding for this job, after there was a conflict between the editors of Vorwärts and the party executive. His appointment was also meant to raise the share of Marxism in the editing. In a short time, Hilferding took a leading role in the paper and was soon appointed editor-in-chief. Together with his work for Die Neue Zeit and Der Kampf, it provided him an adequate income. He was also supported by his fellow Austrian, Karl Kautsky, who was his mentor and whom he succeeded in the 1920s as the chief theoretician of the SPD. Hilferding's theoretical abilities and his personal relationships to leading socialists allowed him to make his career in the party.

He published his most famous work, Das Finanzkapital (Finance Capital), in 1910, which was an important theoretical milestone that has kept its importance until today. It built Hilferding's reputation as a significant economist, a leading economist theoretician of the Socialist International, and, together with his leading position in Vorwärts, helped him raise into the national decision level of the SPD. It also confirmed his position in the marxist center of the SPD, of which he was now one of the most important figures. Since 1912 he represented Vorwärts at the meetings of the party commission, which allowed him to decisively take part in the decision-making of the socialist politics in the years before World War I.

When World War I broke out in 1914, Hilferding was one of the few social democrats who from the very start opposed the SPD's Burgfriedenspolitik and the party's support for the German war effort, including its vote for war loans. In an internal party vote, he was only one of a small minority, led by Hugo Haase, a close friend of his, and thus they had to yield to the party's decision to support the Reichstag motion on the war loans. Hilferding, together with the majority of the editors of Vorwärts, signed a declaration to oppose these policies. In October 1915, the SPD leadership fired all these opposing editors, but Hilferding had already been drafted into the Austro-Hungarian Army as a medic long before.

At first, Hilferding was stationed in Vienna, where he led the field hospital for epidemics. He lived together with his wife and his two sons, Karl and Peter, who was born in 1908. Thanks to his correspondence with Kautsky, he got news about the party. Then, in 1916, he was sent to Steinach am Brenner, near the Italian border, as a combat medic. During the whole war, Hilferding remained active in writing and was politically involved. He published numerous articles in Die Neue Zeit and Kampf. One of these articles, published in October 1915, summarized the situation of the SPD and revised his theories of Finance Capital containing his first formulation of the concept of organized capitalism.

=== Weimar Republic ===
Hilferding joined the anti-war Independent Social Democratic Party of Germany (USPD) in 1918. During the November Revolution in 1918, he returned to Berlin, shortly after the Republic was proclaimed and the emperor had fled. For the following three years, he was editor-in-chief of the USPD's daily newspaper, Die Freiheit, and thus member of the party executive. The Freiheit quickly became one of Berlin's most widely read dailies with a circulation of 200,000. In 1925, Kurt Tucholsky in Die Weltbühne argued that Hilferding had made the newspaper harmless and acted like a representative of the Imperial Association for Combating Social Democracy.

The Council of the People's Deputies, the provisional government of the November Revolution, consisting of members of the SPD and USPD, which had signed the cease-fire, delegated Hilferding to the Sozialisierungskommission (Socialization Committee). Its official task was to socialize suitable industries. He spent months with this project, which was, in spite of support among the workers, not a priority for the government. In fact, the SPD leadership opposed socialization at this point since the armistice, demobilisation of the army and feeding the German people seemed more pressing issues at the time. Hilferding gave a speech before the Reichsrätekongress (worker's councils' congress) and presented a plan to socialize industry. It went down well with the congress and a resolution was passed, but the government largely ignored it. The government's lack of support was the reason why this committee was disbanded in April 1919. After the Kapp-Lüttwitz-Putsch, the government, under pressure, appointed a new Socialization Committee, of which Hilferding was again a member, but the government was still not keen to pursue a course of socialization.

Tensions between the SPD and USPD escalated when Friedrich Ebert used troops to suppress an uprising by revolutionary sailors in Berlin on 24 December 1918 without consulting the USPD. To protest the policies of the Council, the USPD withdrew its three representatives from the government. Hilferding, who had accused the SPD of trying to oust the USPD from government, supported this decision. After a poor performance of the USPD in the elections for the Weimar National Assembly, leading USPD politicians, including Hilferding, started to support workers' councils. Hilferding wrote articles in the Freiheit and made suggestions how they should be implemented, which were sharply criticized by Lenin.

Hilferding disagreed with the Bolsheviks, led by Lenin, and opposed the October Revolution. He later described the USSR as "the first totalitarian state" and a "totalitarian state economy".

In 1919, he acquired German citizenship and in 1920, he was appointed to the Reich Economic Council. In 1922, he strongly opposed a merger of the USPD with the Communist Party of Germany, which he attacked throughout the 1920s, and instead supported the merger with the SPD, where he emerged as its most prominent and visible spokesperson. At the peak of the inflation in the Weimar Republic, he served as the German Minister of Finance from August to October 1923. He contributed to stabilizing the mark, but was unable to stop the inflation. During his term of office, the introduction of the Rentenmark was decided, but he resigned from office shortly before the monetary reform took place.

From 1924 to 1933, Hilferding was publisher of the theoretical journal Die Gesellschaft. On 4 May 1924, he was elected to the Reichstag for the SPD where he served as the SPD's chief spokesman on financial matters until 1933. Together with Karl Kautsky he formulated the Heidelberg Program in 1925. Between 1928 and 1929, he again served as finance minister, on the eve of the Great Depression. He had to relinquish this position because of pressure from the President of the Reichsbank, Hjalmar Schacht, who called for a comprehensive tax reform in Weimar Germany to save the country from insolvency. Schacht together with Wilhelm Groener, Kurt von Schleicher, and Otto Meissner planned for a government that excluded the SPD.

Hilferding remained the leading economist of the SPD after leaving office. During the Depression, he defended the deflationary austerity regime of Chancellor Heinrich Brüning and opposed the proto-Keynesian WTB plan supported by the unions.

=== Life in exile ===
After Hitler's coming to power, Hilferding as a prominent socialist and Jew had to flee into exile in 1933, together with his close associate Rudolf Breitscheid and other important party leaders, first to Denmark, then Saarbrücken, Paris, and finally Zurich, Switzerland. He lived in Zurich until 1938 and from 1939 on in Paris, France. However, he remained influential, having been appointed to important posts in SPD's Sopade. Between 1933 and 1936, he was editor-in-chief of Die Zeitschrift für Sozialismus and contributor to Neuer Vorwärts. Until 1939 he was also the party's representative for the Socialist International and his advice was sought by the SPD leadership in exile.

After the attack on France he and Breitscheid fled to unoccupied Marseille. Efforts were undertaken by the Refugee Committee, under Varian Fry, to get him out of Vichy France, along with Rudolf Breitscheid. However, they both refused to leave illegally, because they didn't have identification papers. They were arrested by the police of the Vichy government in southern France and, despite their emergency visa to enter the United States of America, handed over to the Gestapo on 9 February 1941. Hilferding was brought to Paris and was severely maltreated on the way. After being tortured, he died of unknown causes in a prison in Paris, the Gestapo dungeon of La Santé. His death was not officially announced until the fall of 1941. Fry, among others, believed that Hilferding was murdered by the Gestapo on the orders of Adolf Hitler or another senior Nazi Party official. His wife at the time of his death was Rose. She escaped to the United States. Hilferding's earlier wife, Margarete, died in the Theresienstadt Ghetto in 1942.

== Finance Capital ==
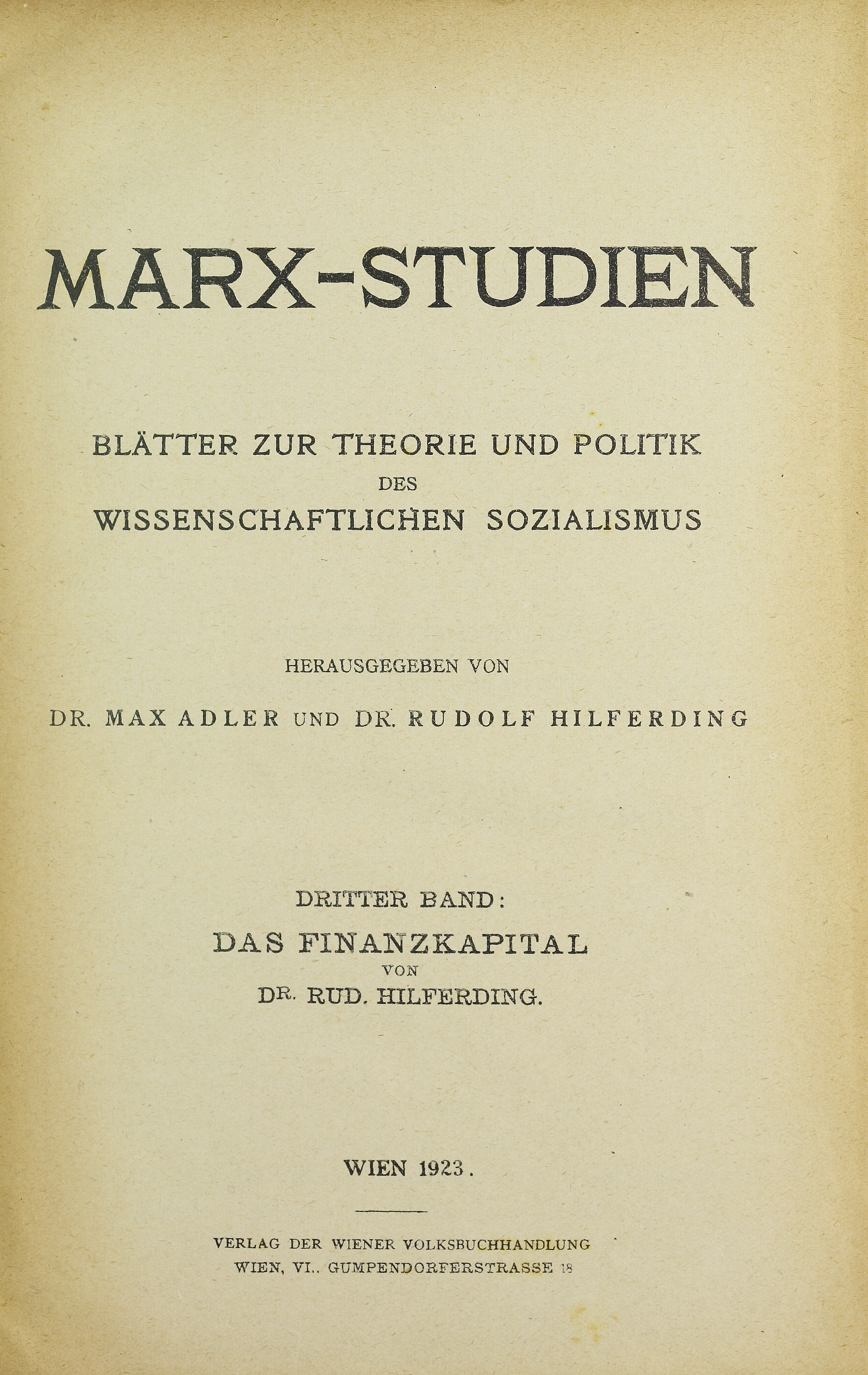
Finanzkapital, 1923

Hilferding's Finance Capital (Das Finanzkapital, Vienna: 1910) was "the seminal Marxist analysis of the transformation of competitive and pluralistic 'liberal capitalism' into monopolistic 'finance capital'", and anticipated Lenin's and Bukharin's "largely derivative" writings on the subject. Writing in the context of the highly cartelized economy of late Austria-Hungary, Hilferding contrasted monopolistic finance capitalism to the earlier, "competitive" and "buccaneering" capitalism of the earlier liberal era. The unification of industrial, mercantile and banking interests had defused the earlier liberal capitalist demands for the reduction of the economic role of a mercantilist state; instead, finance capital sought a "centralized and privilege-dispensing state". Hilferding saw this as part of the inevitable concentration of capital called for by Marxian economics.

Whereas, until the 1860s, the demands of capital and of the bourgeoisie had been, in Hilferding's view, constitutional demands that had "affected all citizens alike," finance capital increasingly sought state intervention on behalf of the wealth-owning classes; capitalists, rather than the nobility, now dominated the state.

In this, Hilferding saw an opportunity for a path to socialism that was distinct from the one foreseen by Marx: "The socializing function of finance capital facilitates enormously the task of overcoming capitalism. Once finance capital has brought the most importance (sic) branches of production under its control, it is enough for society, through its conscious executive organ – the state conquered by the working class – to seize finance capital in order to gain immediate control of these branches of production." This would make it unnecessary to expropriate "peasant farms and small businesses" because they would be indirectly socialized, through the socialization of institutions upon which finance capital had already made them dependent. Thus, because a narrow class dominated the economy, socialist revolution could gain wider support by directly expropriating only from that narrow class. In particular, according to Hilferding, societies that had not reached the level of economic maturity anticipated by Marx as making them "ripe" for socialism could be opened to socialist possibilities. Furthermore, "the policy of finance capital is bound to lead towards war, and hence to the unleashing of revolutionary storms."
