= Gesellschaft (disambiguation) =

Gesellschaft is one of the categories used by the German sociologist Ferdinand Tönnies to categorize social ties.

Gesellschaft may also refer to:

- Die Gesellschaft (literary magazine), a literary magazine published 1885–1902 by Michael Georg Conrad
- Die Gesellschaft (series), a series of monographs published 1906–1912 by Martin Buber
- Die Gesellschaft (political magazine), a 1924–1933 political journal, successor of Die Neue Zeit
- Gesellschaft, a company in German company law
