= The Barbarization of the Sky =

1912 pamphlet by Bertha von Suttner

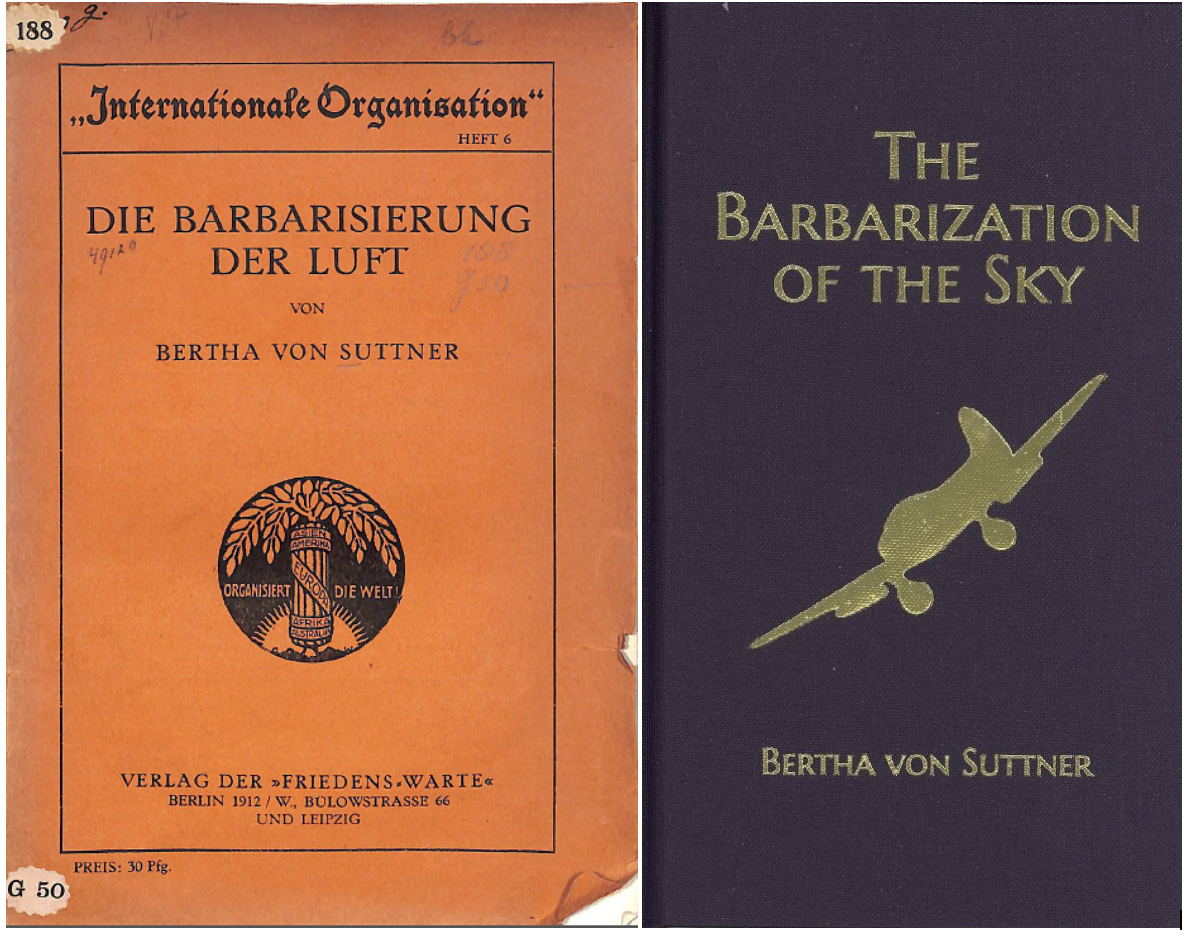
The front covers of Suttner's 1912 essay "Die Barbarisierung der Luft" and its English Translation, published in 2016 by The Bertha von Suttner Project.

The Barbarization of the Sky is the title of a 1912 pamphlet published by Bertha von Suttner. Originally appearing in German under the title "Die Barbarisierung der Luft", the essay was translated in Japanese in 2013, to commemorate the centenary of Suttner's essay. The first full English translation appeared in 2016, to coincide with the 20th anniversary of the Advisory opinion on the Legality of the Threat or Use of Nuclear Weapons of the International Court of Justice which is housed in the Peace Palace. The book was officially launched on July 4, 2017, at the Peace Palace Library.

Suttner wrote the essay partly to decry the failure of governments to honor their formal Declarations "on the Launching of Projectiles and Explosives from Balloons" made during the 1899 and 1907 Hague Peace Conferences. In these Declarations, numerous governments pledged to forego aerial warfare in large part due to the fact that steerability (dirigibility) had not yet been perfected. As Frederick Holls explains in his book on the 1899 Conference, the lack of steerability posed a problem for the accuracy of targeting. However, delegates to the 1899 Conference imagined that technology would overcome this limitation and that precise targeting from the air would eventually become possible. Rather than an outright ban ('perpetual prohibition') on dropping explosives from balloons, the 1899 prohibition was limited to a 5-year period. This limitation was proposed by Captain William Crozier, one of the members of the U.S. delegation to the 1899 Hague Peace Conference. As Holls describes it:

On the subject of balloons, the subcommittee first voted a perpetual prohibition of their use, or that of similar new machines for throwing projectiles or explosives. In the full committee, on motion of Captain Crozier, the prohibition was unanimously limited to cover a period of five years only. The action taken was for humanitarian reasons alone, and was founded upon the opinion that balloons, as they now exist, form so uncertain a means of injury that they can not be used with accuracy. The persons or objects injured by throwing explosives may be entirely disconnected from the conflict, and such that their injury or destruction would be of no practical advantage to the party making use of the machines. The limitation of the prohibition to five years' duration preserves liberty of action under such changed circumstances as may be produced by the progress of invention.

Technology had indeed advanced in 1907. Suttner points out in her essay that, as a result, fewer states were willing to limit the use of this new weapon. She wrote the 1912 essay because she was alarmed at the erosion of the norm proscribing "war in the air" which would change the nature of warfare entirely. She notes that Italy drops explosives from the air during the Italo-Turkish War and urges her readers to agitate against "the profanation of the firmament."

Suttner's essay references a number of works available in English such as H. G. Wells' 1908 Novel The War in the Air, and the 1912 Memorial Against the Use of Armed Airships, sponsored by the London Arbitration Association and signed by numerous distinguished figures in Britain such as Arthur Conan Doyle, Thomas Hardy, and Gilbert Murray.
