= German nobility =

Status groups of the medieval society in Central Europe

The German nobility (deutscher Adel) and royalty were status groups of the medieval society in Central Europe, which enjoyed certain privileges relative to other people under the laws and customs in the German-speaking area, until the beginning of the 20th century. Historically, German entities that recognized or conferred nobility included the Holy Roman Empire (962–1806), the German Confederation (1814–1866), and the German Empire (1871–1918). Chancellor Otto von Bismarck in the German Empire had a policy of expanding his political base by ennobling nouveau riche industrialists and businessmen who had no noble ancestors. The nobility flourished during the dramatic industrialization and urbanization of Germany after 1850. Landowners modernized their estates, and oriented their business to an international market. Many younger sons were positioned in the rapidly growing national and regional civil service bureaucracies, as well as in the officer corps of the military. They acquired not only the technical skills but also the necessary education in high prestige German universities that facilitated their success. Many became political leaders of new reform organizations such as agrarian leagues, and pressure groups. The Roman Catholic nobility played a major role in forming the new Centre Party in resistance to Bismarck's anti-Catholic Kulturkampf, while Protestant nobles were similarly active in the Conservative Party.

In August 1919, at the beginning of the Weimar Republic (1918–1933), Germany's new constitution officially abolished royalty and nobility, and the respective legal privileges and immunities appertaining to an individual, a family or any heirs.

Today, German nobility is no longer conferred by the Federal Republic of Germany (1949–present), and constitutionally the descendants of German noble families do not enjoy legal privileges. Hereditary titles are permitted as part of the surname (e.g., the aristocratic particles von and zu), and these surnames can then be inherited by a person's children.

Later developments distinguished the Austrian nobility, which came to be associated with the Austrian Empire and Austria-Hungary. The nobility system of the German Empire was similar to nobility in the Austrian Empire; both developed during the Holy Roman Empire and both ended in 1919 when they were abolished, and legal status and privileges were revoked.

In April 1919, Austrian nobility was abolished under the First Austrian Republic (1919–1934) and, contrary to Germany, the subsequent use and legal recognition of hereditary titles and aristocratic particles and use as part of surnames was banned. Today, Austrian nobility is no longer conferred by the Republic of Austria (1945–present), and the public or official use of noble titles as title or part of the surname, is a minor offence under Austrian law for Austrian citizens.

== Principles ==
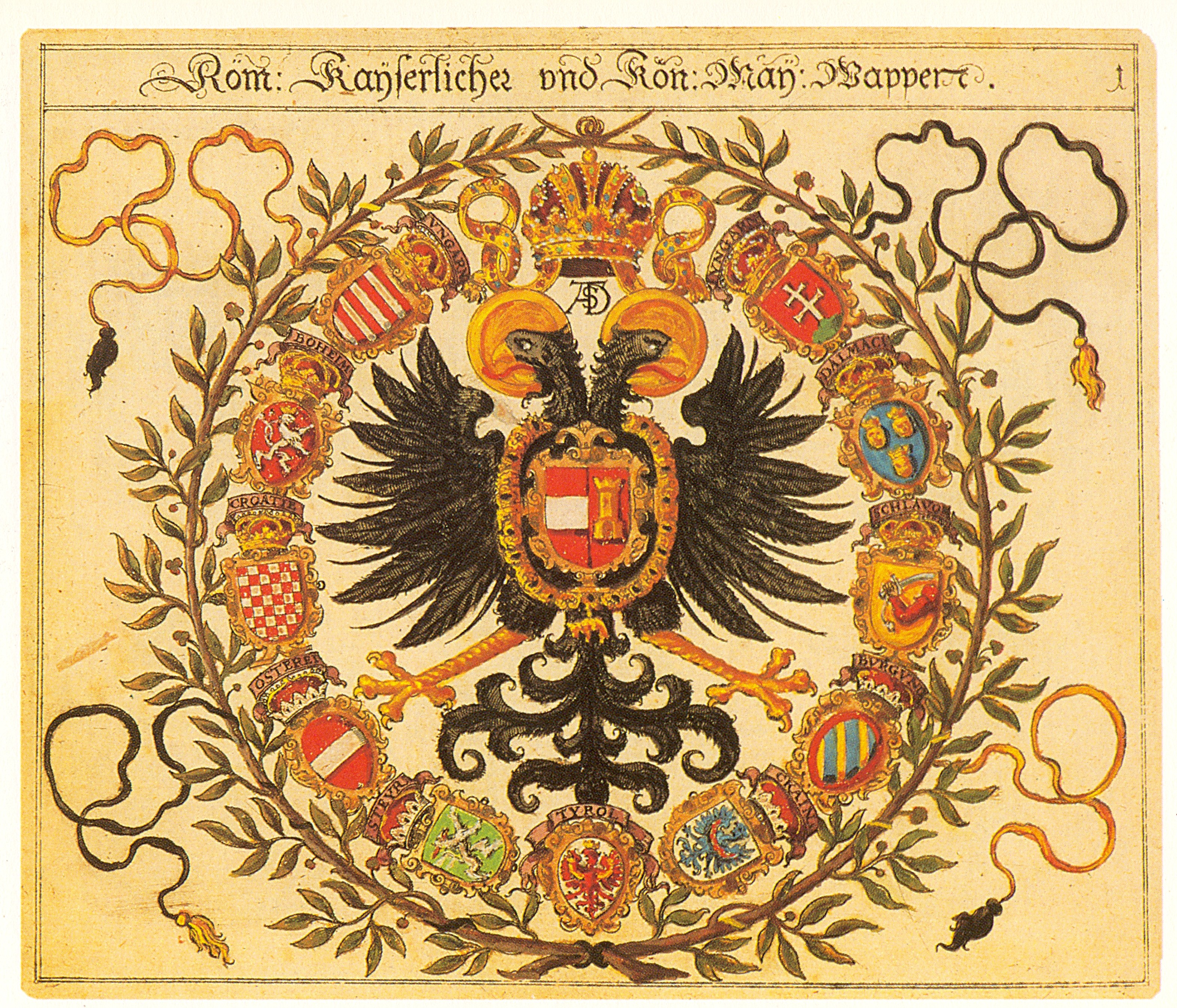
Heraldic arms of the Holy Roman Empire, Siebmachers Wappenbuch

In Germany, nobility and titles pertaining to it were recognised or bestowed upon individuals by emperors, kings and lesser ruling royalty, and were then inherited by the legitimate, male-line descendants of the ennobled person. Families that had been considered noble as early as pre-1400s Germany (i.e., the Uradel or "ancient nobility") were usually eventually recognised by a sovereign, confirming their entitlement to whatever legal privileges nobles enjoyed in that sovereign's realm. Noble rank was usually granted to men by letters patent (see Briefadel), whereas women were members of nobility by descent or by marriage to a nobleman.

German titles of nobility were usually inherited by all male-line descendants, although some descended by male primogeniture, especially in 19th- and 20th-century Prussia (e.g., Otto von Bismarck, born a baronial Junker (not a title), was granted the title of count (Graf) extending to all his male-line descendants, and later that of prince (Fürst) in primogeniture). Upon promulgation of the Weimar Constitution on 11 August 1919, all Germans were declared equal before the law. an exceptional practice regarding surnames borne by former members of the nobility: whereas the gender differentiation in German surnames, widespread until the 18th century and colloquially retained in some dialects, was abolished in Germany with the introduction of officially registered invariable surnames by the late 19th century, former noble titles transformed into parts of the surname in 1919 continue to appear in female and male forms.

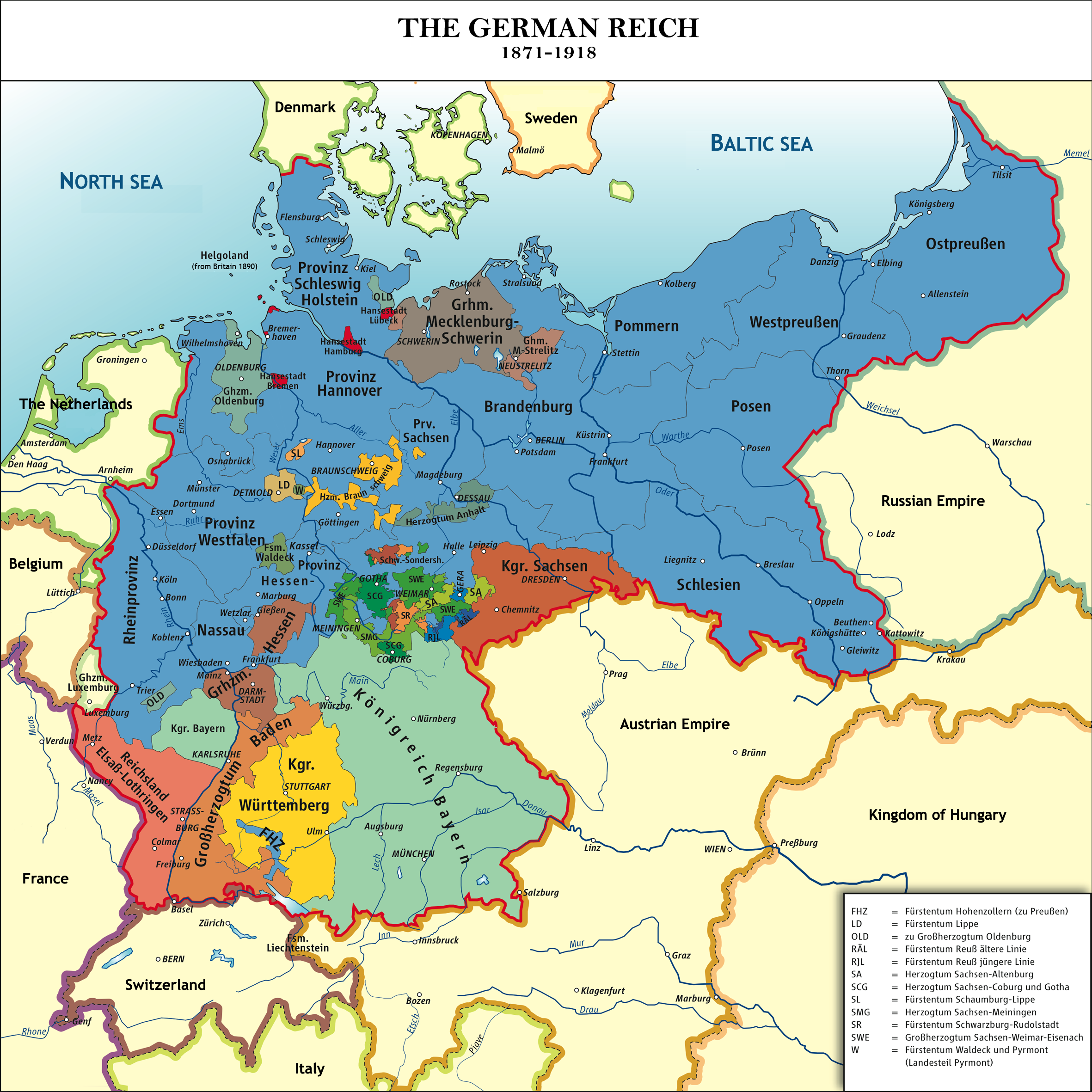
The German Empire in 1871–1918

Altogether abolished were titles of sovereigns, such as emperor/empress, king/queen, grand duke/grand duchess, etc. However, former titles shared and inherited by all members of the family were retained but incorporated into the surname. For instance, members of the former royal families of Prussia and Bavaria were allowed use of Prinz/Prinzessin; or Herzog/Herzogin. In the cases of the former kings/queens of Saxony and Württemberg, the ducal title borne by non-ruling cadets of their dynasties before 1919, or Herzog/Herzogin for the six deposed grand dukes (i.e., the former rulers of Baden, Hesse, Mecklenburg-Schwerin, Mecklenburg-Strelitz, Oldenburg, and Saxe-Weimar-Eisenach) and their consorts were retained.

Any dynasty who did not reign prior to 1918 but had held a specific title as heir to one of Germany's former thrones (e.g., Erbprinz ("hereditary prince"))—along with any heir to a title of nobility inherited via primogeniture, and their wives—were permitted to incorporate those titles into elements of the personal surname. However, these titles became extinct upon their deaths, not being heritable. (Note: Several heirs filed suits against this regulation, but on 11 March 1966 the supreme Federal Administrative Court of Germany ruled, based on Art. 109 of the Weimar Constitution and an earlier decision of the Reichsgericht, that German law on names does not recognise hereditary surname variants for heads of families distinct from the legal surname borne by other family members. (cf., N. N. "Primogenitur – Nur eine Silbe" (in German) ["Primogeniture – only a syllable"], Der Spiegel, No. 15 (1966), p. 61.) With the demise of all persons styled Kronprinz ("crown prince") before 1918, the term no longer exists as a legal surname element. Traditional titles exclusively used for unmarried noblewomen, such as Baronesse, Freiin and Freifräulein, were also transformed into parts of the legal surname, subject to change at marriage or upon request.

All other former titles and nobiliary particles are now inherited as part of the surname, and remain protected as private names under the laws. Whereas the title previously prefixed the given and surname (e.g., Graf Kasimir von der Recke), the legal usage moves the former title to the surname (i.e., Kasimir Graf von der Recke). However, the pre-1919 style sometimes continues in colloquial usage. In Austria, by contrast, not only were the privileges of the nobility abolished, but their titles and nobiliary particles as well. (Note: Thus, for example, Friedrich von Hayek became Friedrich Hayek in 1919 when Austria abolished all indicators of nobility in family names.)

German nobility was not simply distinguished by noble ranks and titles, but was also seen as a distinctive ethos. Title 9, §1 of the General State Laws for the Prussian States declared that the nobility's responsibility "as the first social class in the state" was "the defence of the country, as well as the supporting of the exterior dignity and the interior constitution thereof". Most German states had strict laws concerning proper conduct, employment, or marriage of nobles. Violating these laws could result in temporary or permanent Adelsverlust ("loss of the status of nobility"). Until the late 19th century, for example, it was usually forbidden for nobles, theoretically on pain of Adelsverlust, to marry persons "of low birth". Moreover, nobles employed in menial labour and lowly trades or wage labour could lose their nobility, as could nobles convicted of capital crimes. Adelsverlust only concerned the individual who had violated nobility codes of conduct. Their kin, spouse, and living children were not affected, but children born to a man after an Adelsverlust were commoners and did not inherit the father's former nobility.

Various organisations perpetuate the historical legacy of the former nobility, documenting genealogy, chronicling the history of noble families and sometimes declining to acknowledge persons who acquired noble surnames in ways impossible before 1919.

=== Marriage strategies ===
Many German states, however, required a marriage to a woman of elevated social status in order for a nobleman to pass on his titles and privileges to his children. In this respect, the General State Laws for the Prussian States of 1794 spoke of marriage (and children) "to the right hand". This excluded marriages with women of the lower social classes, but did not mean a woman had to come from nobility herself. Especially towards the end of the 19th century and beyond, when a new upper class of wealthy common people had emerged following industrialization, marriages with commoners were becoming more widespread. However, with few exceptions, this did not apply to higher nobility, who largely continued to marry among themselves. Upwardly mobile German families typically followed marriage strategies involving men of lower rank marrying women of higher status who brought a major dowry.

== Nobiliary particles ==
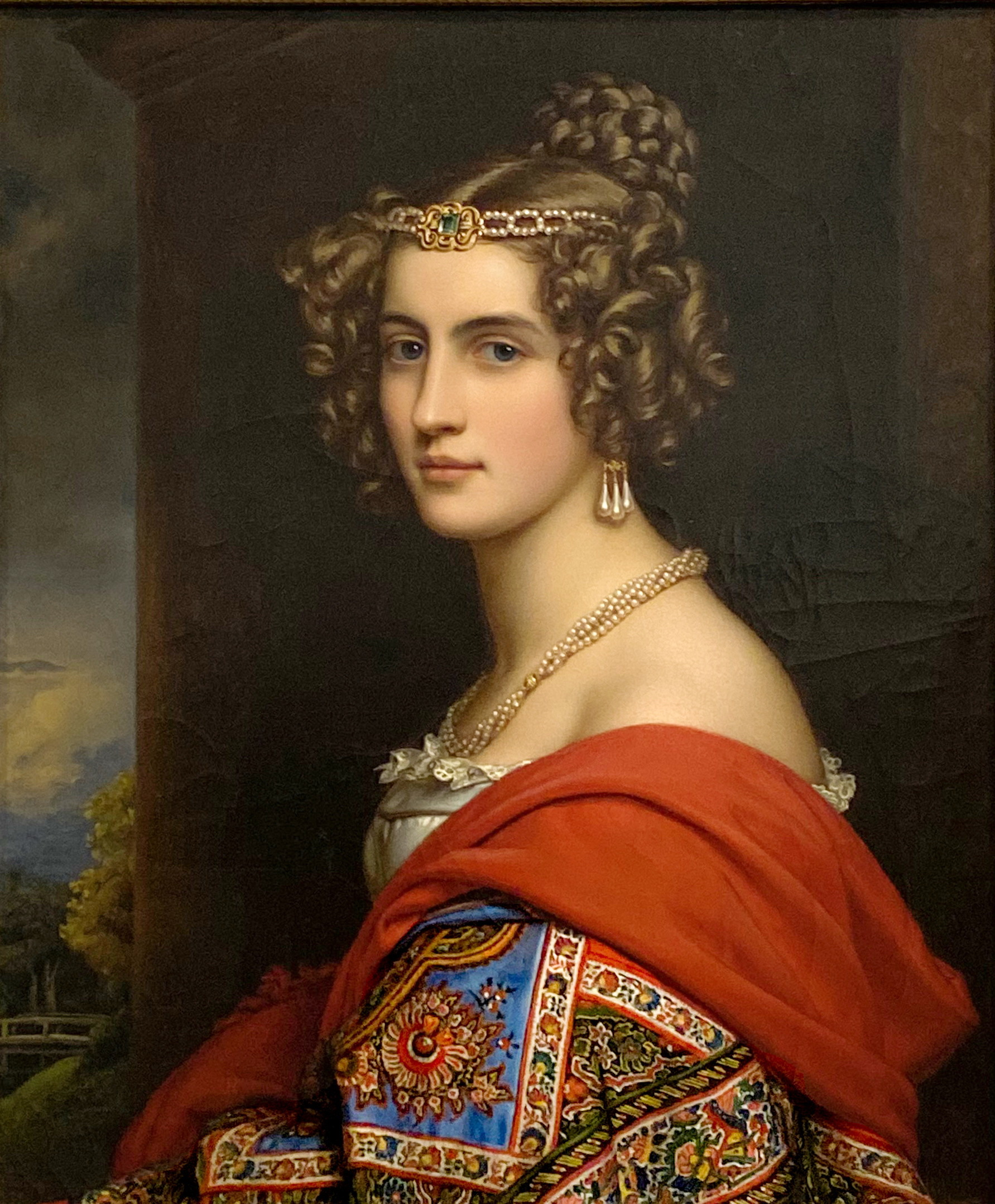
Amalia von Schintling in a painting for the Gallery of Beauties in 1826

Most, but not all, surnames of the German nobility were preceded by or contained the preposition von (meaning "of") or zu (meaning "at") as a nobiliary particle. The two were occasionally combined into von und zu (meaning "of and at"). In general, the von form indicates the family's place of origin, while the zu form indicates the family's continued possession of the estate from which the surname is drawn. Therefore, von und zu indicates a family which is both named for and continues to own their original feudal holding or residence. However, the zu particle can also hint to the split of a dynasty, as providing information on the adopted new home of one split-off branch: For instance, a senior branch owning and maybe even still residing at the place of the dynasty's origin might have been called of A-Town [{and at} A-Town] furthermore, while a new, junior branch could then have adopted the style of, say, of A-town [and] at B-ville, sometimes even dropping [and] at, simply hyphenating the names of the two places. Other forms also exist as combinations with the definite article: e.g. von dem [masc. or neut.] → vom ("of the"), zu der [fem.] → zur or zu dem [masc. or neut.] → zum ("of the", "in the", "at the"). Particularly between the late 18th and early 20th century when an increasing number of unlanded commoners were ennobled, the von was typically simply put in front of a person's surname. When a person by the common occupational surname of Meyer received nobility, they would thus simply become von Meyer.

When sorting noble—as well as non-noble—names in alphabetic sequence, any prepositions or (former) title are ignored. Name elements which have developed from honorary functions, such as Schenk (short for Mundschenk, i.e., "cup-bearer"), are also overlooked. Nobiliary particles are not capitalised unless they begin a sentence, and then they are usually skipped, unless this creates confusion. In this, the German language practice differs from Dutch in the Netherlands, where the particle van is usually capitalised when mentioned without preceding given names or initials, or from Dutch in Belgium, where the name particle Van is always capitalised.

== Nobiliary law today ==
Although nobility as a class is no longer recognised in Germany and enjoys no legal privileges, institutions exist that carry on the legal tradition of pre-1919 nobiliary law, which in Germany today is subsumed under Sonderprivatrecht, 'special private law'. The Deutscher Adelsrechtsausschuss, 'German Commission on Nobiliary Law' can decide matters such as lineage, legitimacy, and a person's right to bear a name of nobility, in accordance with codified nobiliary law as it existed prior to 1919. The Commission's rulings are generally non-binding for individuals and establish no rights or privileges that German authorities or courts would have to consider or observe. However, they are binding for all German nobility associations recognized by CILANE (Commission d'information et de liaison des associations nobles d'Europe).

In 1919, nobiliary particles and titles became part of the surname. Therefore, they can be transmitted according to civil law, for example from wife to husband, to illegitimate children and by way of adoption. The only difference to normal surnames is that noble surnames are deflected according to gender.

Some impoverished nobles offered adoptions for money in the 20th century, and the adoptees adopted extensively themselves, creating a "flood" of fake nobility. A noble or noble-sounding surname does not convey nobility to those not born legitimately of a noble father, and these persons are not allowed to join a nobility association. Persons who bear a noble or noble-sounding surname without belonging to the historical nobility according to Salic law are classified as Nichtadelige Namensträger, 'non-noble name-carriers'. The inflation of fake nobility is one of the major concerns of the Adelsrechtsausschuss, and it is up to the commission to determine whether a person should be considered noble or non-noble. For instance, the German-American businessman Frédéric Prinz von Anhalt was born as Hans Robert Lichtenberg in Germany. He was married with Zsa Zsa Gabor and was adopted by Princess Marie-Auguste of Anhalt in 1980, allegedly arranged by the title dealer Hans Hermann Weyer, hence he is one of the 'non-noble name-carriers'.

In special cases, for example when a family is about to die out or when a daughter inherits the family estate and marries a commoner, the Adelsrechtsausschuss can grant a dispensation from Salic law, allowing for a one-time transfer of a noble surname contrary to nobiliary law, to a person considered non-noble.

The following criteria are most important in such cases:

- Danger of extinction of the relevant noble family
- Transfer or inheritance of estates to the recipient of the name, for example to the son of the daughter
- Biological relation with the family giving the name
- Noble ancestors (for example mother or grandmother)
- Proximity to the historical nobility
- Marriage to a noblewoman
- Virtuous personality and sufficient social standing
- Membership in organizations traditionally considered noble, such as certain chivalric orders.

The Adelsrechtsausschuss does not recognize ennoblements made by heads of formerly ruling houses, but the associations of the formerly ruling and mediatized houses of Germany send representatives to the commission.

This so-called (Nichtbeanstandung), 'Non-Objection' results in the factual ennoblement of the recipient (even though the term is not applied), making Germany one of the few republics where it is still possible for non-nobles to join the ranks of the nobility even though there is no monarch who can ennoble anymore. However, dispensations are granted only in the most exceptional cases, as they infringe on the rights of a theoretical future monarch.

When a person is granted a dispensation by the Adelsrechtsausschuss, he becomes the progenitor of a new noble family, which consists of all of his legitimate male-line descendants in accordance with nobiliary law. They are considered equal to nobles in all regards, and allowed to join nobility associations.

== Uradel and Briefadel ==
A family whose nobility dates back to at least the 14th century may be called Uradel, or alter Adel ("ancient nobility" or "old nobility"). This contrasts with Briefadel ("letter nobility"): nobility granted by letters patent. The first known such document is from 30 September 1360, for Wyker Frosch in Mainz. The term Uradel was not without controversy, and the concept was seen by some as an arbitrary distinction invented by the Kingdom of Prussia.

== Hochadel ==
Hochadel (German pronunciation: [ˈhoːxˌʔaːdl̩]; "upper nobility", or "high nobility") were those noble houses which ruled sovereign states within the Holy Roman Empire and, later, in the German Confederation and the German Empire. They were royalty; the heads of these families were entitled to be addressed by some form of "Majesty" or "Highness". These were the families of kings (Bavaria, Hanover, Prussia, Saxony, and Württemberg), grand dukes (Baden, Hesse and by Rhine, Luxembourg, Mecklenburg-Schwerin, Mecklenburg-Strelitz, Oldenburg and Saxe-Weimar-Eisenach), reigning dukes (Anhalt, Brunswick, Schleswig-Holstein, Nassau, Saxe-Altenburg, Saxe-Coburg and Gotha, Saxe-Meiningen), and reigning princes (Hohenzollern-Hechingen, Hohenzollern-Sigmaringen, Liechtenstein, Lippe, Reuss, Schaumburg-Lippe, Schwarzburg, and Waldeck-Pyrmont).

The Hochadel also included the Empire's formerly quasi-sovereign families whose domains had been mediatised within the German Confederation by 1815, yet preserved the legal right to continue royal intermarriage with still-reigning dynasties (Ebenbürtigkeit [ˈeːbn̩ˌbʏʁtɪçkaɪ̯t]). These quasi-sovereign families comprised mostly princely and comital families, but included a few dukes also of Belgian and Dutch origin (Arenberg, Croÿ, Looz-Corswarem). Information on these families constituted the second section of Justus Perthes’ entries on reigning, princely, and ducal families in the Almanach de Gotha.

During the unification of Germany, mainly from 1866 to 1871, the states of Hanover, Hesse-Kassel, Hohenzollern-Hechingen, Hohenzollern-Sigmaringen (in 1850), Schleswig-Holstein and Nassau were absorbed into Prussia. The former ruling houses of these states were still considered Hochadel under laws adopted by the German Empire.

In addition, the ruling families of Hohenzollern-Hechingen and Hohenzollern-Sigmaringen were accorded the dynastic rights of a cadet branch of the Royal House of Prussia after yielding sovereignty to their royal kinsmen. The exiled heirs to Hanover and Nassau eventually regained sovereignty by being allowed to inherit, respectively, the crowns of Brunswick (1914) and Luxembourg (1890).

== Niederer Adel ==
Nobility that held legal privileges until 1918 greater than those enjoyed by commoners, but less than those enjoyed by the Hochadel, were considered part of the lower nobility or Niederer Adel. Most were untitled, only making use of the particle von in their surnames. Higher-ranking noble families of the Niederer Adel bore such hereditary titles as Edler (lord), Ritter (knight), Freiherr (or baron) and Graf (or count). Although most German counts belonged officially to the lower nobility, those who were mediatised belonged to the Hochadel, the heads of their families being entitled to be addressed as Erlaucht ("Illustrious Highness"), rather than simply as Hochgeboren ("High-born"). There were also some German noble families, especially in Austria, Prussia and Bavaria, whose heads bore the titles of Fürst (prince) or Herzog (duke); however, never having exercised a degree of sovereignty, they were accounted members of the lower nobility (e.g., Bismarck, Blücher, Putbus, Hanau, Henckel von Donnersmarck, Pless, Wrede).

== Titles and ranks ==
The titles of elector, grand duke, archduke, duke, landgrave, margrave, count palatine, prince and Reichsgraf were borne by rulers who belonged to Germany's Hochadel. Other counts, as well as barons (Freiherren/Barons), lords (Herren), Landed knights (Ritter) (Note: In German, the meaning of Ritter is "rider", and likewise for the Dutch and Scandinavian title ridder. These words are cognates derived from Germanic rīdan, "to ride", from Proto-Indo-European reidh-.) were borne by noble, non-reigning families. The vast majority of the German nobility, however, inherited no titles, and were usually distinguishable only by the nobiliary particle von in their surnames.

Titles and territories
Title (English)	Title (German)	Territory (English)	Territory (German)
Prince-elector	Kurfürst(in)	Electorate	Kurfürstentum
Prince of the Empire	Reichsfürst(in)^{1}	Principality with Imperial Immediacy	Reichsfürstentum
Duke/Duchess	Herzog(in)	Duchy, Dukedom	Herzogtum
Sovereign Prince	Fürst(in)	Principality	Fürstentum
Margrave/Margravine	Markgraf/Markgräfin	Margraviate, March	Markgrafschaft
Count(ess) Palatine	Pfalzgraf/Pfalzgräfin	County Palatine, Palatinate	Pfalzgrafschaft
Landgrave/Landgravine	Landgraf/Landgräfin	Landgraviate	Landgrafschaft
Count(ess) of the Empire	Reichsgraf^{1}/Reichsgräfin	County	Grafschaft
Burgrave/Burgravine	Burggraf/Burggräfin	Burgraviate	Burggrafschaft
Baron(ess) of the Empire	Reichsfreiherr (Note: The prefix Reichs- indicates a title granted by a past Holy Roman Emperor; these titles conferred higher precedence than that associated with other titles of the same nominal rank.)/Reichsfreifrau/Reichsfreiin (Note: Freiin indicates an unmarried baroness by birth.)	(Allodial) Barony	Freiherrschaft

Title (English)	Title (German)
Holy Roman Emperor / Emperor of the Romans	Kaiser der Römer
German Emperor (after 1871)	Deutscher Kaiser
Prince-elector	Kurfürst(in)
King	König(in)
Archduke/Archduchess	Erzherzog(in)
Prince-Archbishop	Fürsterzbischof
Grand Duke/Grand Duchess	Großherzog(in)
Prince-Bishop	Fürstbischof
Prince-Abbot/Princess-Abbess	Fürstabt/Fürstäbtissin
Prince-provost	Fürstpropst
Mediatised Prince (Also called Princes of the Empire, or Imperial Princes)	Reichsfürst(in)
Sovereign Grandmaster	Großmeister
Duke/Duchess	Herzog(in)
Prince/Princess (Sovereign Prince)	Fürst(in)
Margrave/Margravine	Markgraf/Markgräfin
Landgrave/Landgravine	Landgraf/Landgräfin
Count(ess) Palatine	Pfalzgraf/Pfalzgräfin
Princely Count	Gefürsteter Graf
Imperial Count(ess)	Reichsgraf/Reichsgräfin
Imperial Abbot / Imperial Abbess	Reichsabt/Reichsäbtissin
Imperial Provost	Reichspropst
Burgrave/Burgravine	Burggraf/Burggräfin
Altgrave/Altgravine	Altgraf/Altgräfin
Waldgrave	Waldgraf/gräfin
Raugrave	Raugraf/gräfin
Rhinegrave	Rheingraf/gräfin
Count(ess)	Graf/Gräfin
Imperial Baron(ess)	Reichsfreiherr/Reichsfreifrau/Reichsfreiin
Castellan	Burgmann
Imperial Knight	Reichsritter
Baron(ess)	Freiherr/Freifrau/Freiin/Baron
Lord / Noble Lord	Herr/Edler Herr
Landed Hereditary Knight	Ritter
Noble	Edler/Edle
Young Lord (Often grouped with Untitled Noble)	Junker
Unlanded Hereditary Knight / Free knight	Edelfrei
Untitled Noble

== See also ==
- Feudalism
- Former German nobility in the Nazi Party
- German Mediatisation
- Holy Roman Empire
- Neues allgemeines deutsches Adels-Lexicon
- Patricianship
- List of European Jewish nobility
