= Die Waffen nieder! =

Novel by Bertha von Suttner

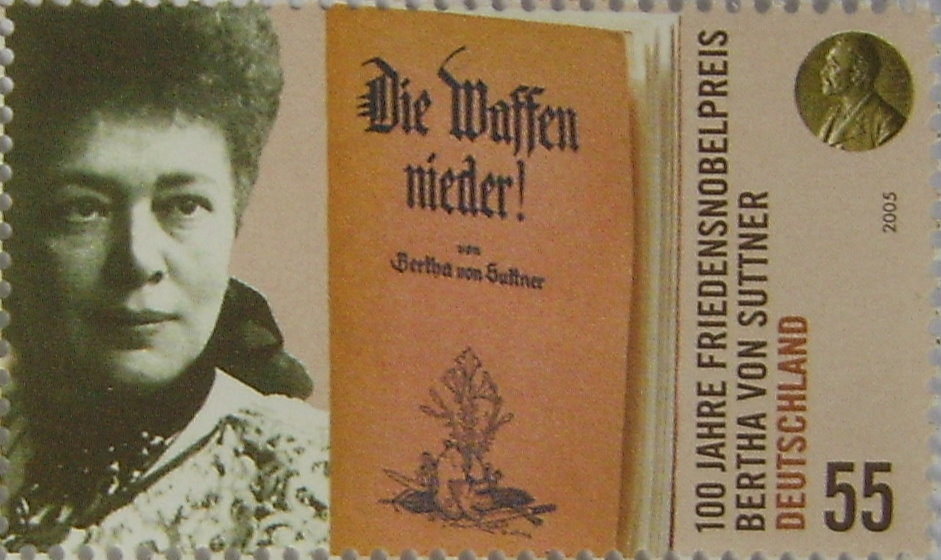
The cover of Die Waffen nieder! and a picture of von Suttner

The book Die Waffen nieder! (Down with Weapons!) or Lay Down Your Arms! is the best-known novel by the author and peace activist Bertha von Suttner, who received the Nobel Peace Prize in 1905 for the book. The book was published in 1889 in German by the publisher Edgar Pierson in Dresden and became very quickly successful, both because of its look at war and peace and because it addressed the issue of women in society. Three years later, it was published in English as Lay Down Your Arms!, then in Italian in 1897 as Abbasso le Armi!, and in Spanish in 1905 as ¡Abajo las armas!. The novel was printed in a total of 37 German editions before 1905. It has been translated into a total of sixteen languages, including Finnish, Danish, Norwegian, Swedish, and Czech.

Until the publication of All Quiet on the Western Front in 1929, Die Waffen nieder was the most important German language literary work concerning war. Von Suttner chose to write a novel instead of a nonfiction book because she believed that the novel form would reach a wider audience.

Von Suttner published a monthly magazine which was also called Die Waffen nieder!. She also published a sequel to Die Waffen nieder, Marthas Kinder, in 1903, although it was never as popular as Die Waffen nieder.

Die Waffen nieder was adapted into film twice, in 1914 and in 1952.

== Plot ==
The novel is from the point of view of the Austrian countess Martha Althaus over the course of four wars. During the Second Italian War of Independence, at age 19, Althaus loses her husband, the count Arno Dotzky, and decides that she is against war. Her second husband, Baron Friedrich Tilling, shares her pacifistic convictions even though he is an officer in the Austrian army. He fought in the Second Schleswig War alongside Prussia in 1864, and in the Austro-Prussian War in 1866. Althaus' sisters and brother die of cholera because of the war, and her father dies of grief after losing his children. Friedrich then retires from the army to support Althaus' peace activism. During the Franco-Prussian War, Friedrich is shot while staying in Paris because he is suspected of being a Prussian spy. Althaus' son from her first marriage, Rudolf, begins to follow in his mother's footsteps.
