= Caroline Playne =

Caroline Elizabeth Playne (2 May 1857 – 27 January 1948) was an English pacifist, humanitarian, novelist, and historian of the First World War.

== Early life ==
Very little is known about the personal details of Playne's life, as she left little of her own documentary evidence. She was born in Avening, Gloucestershire, one of two daughters of Margarettia Sara, a Dutchwoman, and her English husband, George Frederick Playne, a cloth manufacturer. Caroline was multilingual from childhood, speaking English and Dutch, while her later historical work suggests she also was familiar with French and German. Some time after her father's death in 1879, Playne moved with her mother to Hampstead, London, where she lived for the rest of her life. Margarettia died in 1905.

Playne's first foray into writing was as a romantic novelist. In 1904 she published The Romance of a Lonely Woman closely followed by The Terror of the Macdurghotts in 1907, both novels published by T. Fisher Unwin under the name C.E. Playne. In 1908, Playne was elected an associate member of the University Women's Club.

== Peace and humanitarian work ==
Caroline Playne formally approached pacifist work some time around 1905, and quickly became a committed activist and member of a wide range of organisations. She was a representative of the National Peace Council (NPC), created to support the action of the international court in The Hague, and in 1910 was a founder member of the Church of England Peace League, a member organisation of the NPC dedicated to "keep[ing] before members of the Church of England 'the duty of combating the war spirit'". Over the following years she also became a member of the Hampstead Peace Society, the League of Peace and Freedom, and the Peace Society. Playne became a regular attendee and speaker at national and international peace conferences. In 1908 she took part in the International Congress for Peace in London, and on this occasion she met the Austrian pacifist Bertha von Suttner, of whom she later wrote a biography. Playne was present at an NPC meeting on 4 August 1914, which condemned the secret diplomacy of the British government in the years before the war.

At the outbreak of the First World War, Playne immediately became a committee member of the Society of Friends' Emergency Committee for the Assistance of Germans, Austrians and Hungarians in Distress, an organisation set up to assist citizens of those countries in Britain, including prisoners of war. She became heavily involved in this work, helping with accommodation and other needs for the thousands of "enemy aliens" who appealed to the Committee for help, while also taking up detailed committee tasks and financial scrutiny.

Alongside this humanitarian work, Playne joined the Union of Democratic Control when it was formed in 1914, hosting events for the organisation at her London home. She was also involved in encouraging personal correspondence between the belligerent countries; the tracing of missing persons; and translating German newspaper articles for British audiences.

== Historical writing ==
During the war, Playne assembled a large mass of research on the conflict and events in London, including some 530 books and pamphlets. With the addition of her own voluminous diary observations, and encouraged by her friend, the writer Vernon Lee, this collection provided the material for her four major studies of the war and its causes: The Neuroses of the Nations (1925); The Pre-War Mind in Britain (1928); Society at War 1914–1916 (1931); Britain Holds On 1917–1918 (1933).

Both pioneering and idiosyncratic, Playne's historical work draws heavily on the emerging methodologies of social psychology to argue that the War represented a collective "neurosis" of the European mind. Preoccupied with "the mind and the passions of the multitude", Playne deployed a vast array of sources and quotations to critique European culture before and during the War, especially its nationalism, imperialism and militarism. She argues that the technological and social developments of the late nineteenth and early twentieth centuries "disorientated" and "disjointed" European societies, and was especially damaging to the "mental calibre" of the cultural elite. Her work is particularly notable for emphasising the influence of mass media in shaping and directing public opinion, anticipating media studies by fifty years. Taken together, argues the historian Richard Espley, the four books can be regarded as a single "2,500 page meditation on the neurotic, militaristic failure of western culture".

The reason for this study is the belief that there was a strange failure in the reaction of men to the vast accession of knowledge and power which conjured up a period of rapid material and mechanical development and change. Instead of being able to adjust themselves, to fashion their minds, to strengthen their nerves in order to meet the constant fresh developments which their attainments achieved, the human reaction was inconsequent, over-indulgent, lopsided and therefore disastrous.

— Caroline E. Playne, The Pre-War Mind in Britain (1928)

Despite the originality of her approach to the study of the War, Playne has been neglected by later scholars. Where they are used, her books are largely drawn upon as sources for detail and reportage of the war years, rather than analyses in their own right.

== Later life and death ==
In 1938, Playne deposited her research collection in the library at Senate House, London. Playne never married, and left no children. She died at Hampstead in 1948.

== Works ==
Fiction:

- The Romance of a Lonely Woman, London: T. Fisher Unwin, 1904
- The Terror of the Macdurghotts, London: T. Fisher Unwin, 1907

Non-Fiction:

- The Neuroses of the Nations, London: George Allen & Unwin Ltd, 1925
- The Pre-War Mind in Britain. An Historical Review, London: George Allen & Unwin Ltd, 1928
- Society at War 1914–1916, London: George Allen & Unwin Ltd, 1931
- Britain Holds On 1917, 1918, London: George Allen & Unwin Ltd, 1933
- Bertha von Suttner, and the Struggle to Avert the World War, London: George Allen & Unwin Ltd, 1936

The four volumes on the Great War are also available in electronic edition, in a single ebook that collects them all:

- Society in the First World War, GogLiB ebooks, 2018
