= Rudolf Breitscheid =

German politician (1874–1944)

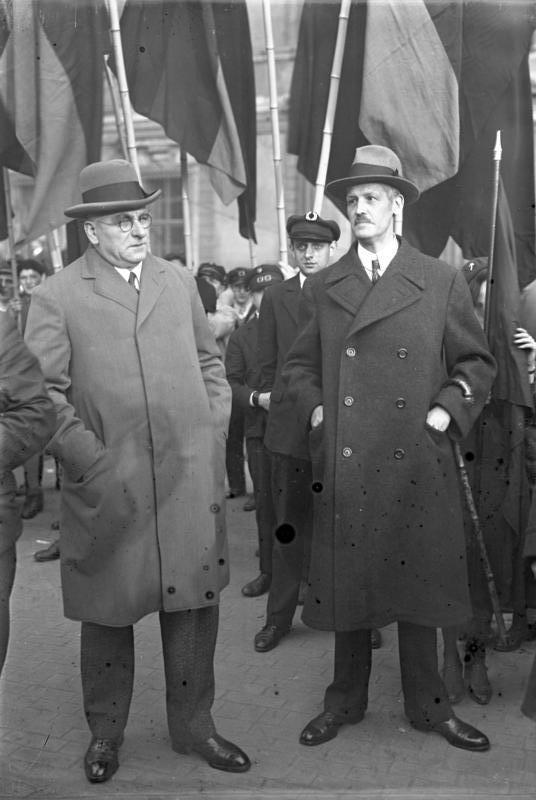
- Breitscheid (right) with Otto Braun (left) in April 1932.

Minister of the Interior of the Free State of Prussia
- In office 16 November 1918 – 4 January 1919

Member of the Reichstag
- In office 24 June 1920 – 1933

Personal details
- Born: 2 November 1874 Cologne, Kingdom of Prussia, German Empire
- Died: 28 August 1944 (aged 69) Buchenwald concentration camp, Nazi Germany
- Party: SPD (1912–1917, 1922–1933); USPD (1917–1922); DV (1908–1912); FVP (1903–1908); NSV (till 1903)
- Spouse: Tony Breitscheid (m. 1908)
- Education: University of Marburg
- Occupation: Economist, journalist

Rudolf Breitscheid (2 November 1874 – 28 August 1944) was a German politician and leading member of the Social Democratic Party of Germany (SPD) during the Weimar Republic. Once leader of the liberal Democratic Union, he joined the SPD in 1912. He defected to the Independent Social Democratic Party of Germany (USPD) in 1917 due to his opposition to the First World War, and rejoined the SPD in 1922. He served as a senior member of and foreign policy spokesman for the SPD Reichstag group during the Weimar Republic, and was a member of the German delegation to the League of Nations. After the Nazi rise to power, he was among the members of the Reichstag who voted against the Enabling Act of 1933, and soon after fled to France to avoid persecution. He was arrested and handed to the Gestapo in 1941, and likely murdered in Buchenwald concentration camp in August 1944 when the Nazis publicly claimed that both he and former Communist Party leader, Ernst Thälmann, who was murdered on Hitler's explicit orders, had both died in an Allied bombing raid on 23 August.

== Early life ==
Breitscheid was born on 2 November 1874 in Cologne to working-class Protestant parents. His father Wilhelm worked in a bookshop, and died when Rudolf was nine years old. His mother Wilhelmine was the daughter of a tailor. He began studying law at Cologne's Friedrich-Wilhelm Gymnasium in 1894, but moved within the year to Marburg to study politics. In 1898 he completed his PhD with a dissertation on "land policy in the Australian colonies".

== Political career ==
=== Early career ===
After graduating, he worked as a journalist for various liberal newspapers in the north of Germany. At this time, his views were classical liberal in nature, and he supported free trade and German colonialism in Africa. He joined the left-liberal National-Social Association and campaigned for the Free-minded Union in the 1903 federal election, subsequently joining the Progressive People's Party (FVP). He moved to Berlin and in 1904 was elected to the city council and the assembly of the Province of Brandenburg. Advancing quickly in the political arena, he became chairman of the FVP's Berlin association and served a lobbyist for free trade issues. He opposed the entrenched power of the nobility, and campaigned for the abolition of the Prussian three-class franchise.

Breitscheid sought election to the Reichstag in the 1907 election, but was defeated by a Junker candidate. After the FVP chose to support the government of conservative Bernhard von Bülow, Breitscheid and a number of other leading liberals left the party and founded the Democratic Union (DV). Breitscheid became its first chairman. The party failed to attract broad support, however, and won less than 30,000 votes in the 1912 election. This defeat greatly disillusioned Breitscheid and, convinced that liberal parties were doomed either to irrelevance or collaboration with conservatives, he left the DV and joined the SPD. His own convictions aligned closely with the SPD's Erfurt program, which advocated for parliamentary democracy, legal equality, separation of church and state, and various other social reforms. Though still sceptical of Marxist theory, he believed that the economic reality of capitalism suppressed the individual rights of workers, and agreed with many socialist perspectives.

Breitscheid quickly gained prominence among the SPD press, but his record as a bourgeois liberal made him unpopular with many of the party's leaders. After he made inaccurate claims to a British newspaper about the party's stance on the First World War, he was attacked scathingly at a party meeting in October 1914 by Friedrich Ebert, who described him as "the last person who should play the role of party schoolmaster abroad". Breitscheid's anti-war activism and support for pacifist Hugo Haase also hampered his journalistic career. In January 1916, he was drafted and sent to the western front, but remained engaged with politics. Disillusioned by the SPD's support for the war, he joined the Independent Social Democratic Party of Germany (USPD) at the end of 1917. The new party nominated him to contest a by-election in Berlin in January 1918, for which he was mostly unable to campaign, and he lost to his SPD opponent.

=== USPD ===
Breitscheid returned to Berlin in the midst of the November Revolution. He helped negotiate the provisional government between the SPD and USPD, and was even recommended as foreign minister, but ultimately became interior minister for the new Prussian government. This posting was short-lived, however, as the government collapsed after just six weeks. Breitscheid returned to journalism as editor of the USPD journal Der Sozialist. The following years represented his most radical phase. Opposed to both the Spartacist left-wing and moderate reformists close to the SPD, he attempted to chart a middle course for the party. Asserting that a simple parliamentary system would be dominated by bourgeois interests and rejecting a dictatorship of the proletariat as undemocratic, he advocated for a system of shared power. Noting that a majority of workers supported the election of a National Assembly, he proposed that this be accepted in conjunction with the establishment of a Central Council, invested with veto and legislative powers, to represent the workers. In his view, this would allow socialism to grow via democratic means without being obstructed by bourgeois influence.

Breitscheid's ideas were criticised by many and earned him few allies in either the USPD or SPD. Moderates were concerned that he lacked commitment to parliamentary democracy, while radicals were put off by his criticism of Bolshevik actions in Russia, which became increasingly common from 1918 onwards. He became increasingly disillusioned with radical rhetoric of the USPD, which he viewed as empty and reflecting a lack of commitment to real action. Nonetheless, he was elected to the Reichstag in the 1920 federal election as a member of the party.

Throughout the year, Breitscheid came to believe that the new republic, though unsatisfactory, gave the best chance for socialism to develop in Germany. A rise in right-wing terror and assassinations caused many on the left to rally in defence of the republic against counterrevolution. Speaking in opposition to a push by liberals and conservatives for the merchant marine to adopt the Imperial flag over the republican one, he said: "the republic is not our final aim. It is only the vessel whose content is socialism. But we defend this vessel against your attacks. We believe that it is one hundred times more valuable for the interests of the German people than that which the capitalists, militarists ... and German nationalists desire." Breitscheid faced strong opposition from the left wing of the USPD. During the debate over the party's membership in the Third International, he was included on a list of members who would need to be expelled for such a move to proceed. After the majority of the USPD joined the Communist Party of Germany (KPD) in October, Breitscheid remained with the rump party and worked to convince others of the value of cooperation with the SPD and bourgeois republican parties. In February 1921, he joined a minority of fellow USPD deputies in breaking party discipline to abstain in a motion of no confidence against the liberal cabinet of Joseph Wirth.

=== Return to the SPD ===
Breitscheid supported reunification with the SPD in 1922, believing that only a united socialist party would have the strength to fight off right-wing attacks. Following reunification, he became one of the SPD's most prominent speakers and parliamentarians, owing to his rhetorical and oratory skills as well as foreign policy expertise.

Breitscheid spent much of the Weimar period focusing on foreign policy, promoting positive relations with Germany's neighbours. Though he opposed the Treaty of Versailles, he advocated fulfilment of its terms to build trust and goodwill with the Entente. He supported the foreign policy of Gustav Stresemann, including the Dawes Plan in 1924, and maintained good relations with the French left, which he utilised to pave the way for the Locarno Treaties in 1925. After Germany's accession to the League of Nations the next year, Stresemann appointed him to the government's delegation. These actions cultivated Breitscheid's reputation as a dedicated republican and won broad respect across party lines; he was considered for the position of foreign minister in the second government of Hermann Müller in 1928, but Stresemann ultimately retained the position.

His prominence within the SPD also grew during this period. In 1927, he was elected to the SPD Reichstag group's executive committee, and in 1928 became one of its three chairmen. At the 1931 congress, he was elected to the executive committee of the party itself. In party discourse, he advocated moderate positions and supported coalitions with other republican parties. At the Kiel congress of 1927, he spoke of opposition not as a "long-term condition" but a prelude to governing responsibility which would be used to promote workers' interests. Breitscheid reluctantly supported the "grand coalition" government formed after the 1928 federal election, believing that the SPD could influence its policy in a progressive direction and continue Stresemann's foreign policy. Though he ultimately found his hopes to be misplaced, he did not support breaking the coalition until March 1930, fearing that such a move would hand control of the government to the right wing.

=== End of the republic ===
After the appointment of the Brüning cabinet, Breitscheid became preoccupied with the prospect of the republic's demise. The rise of the Nazi Party in the 1930 election intensified his fears, and he became dedicated to keeping the Nazis from power. In his view, the SPD had no choice but to support Brüning's cabinet in order to prevent Hitler from entering government.

Compared to many other socialists of the time, Breitscheid had a complex understanding of fascism and the Nazi movement. He characterised fascism as a form of anti-democratic organisation distinguished by its exploitation of democratic systems and usage of pseudo-legal means to achieve its goals, and understood the Nazis not as dedicated ideologues, but power-hungry opportunists, citing their lack of principles as the main factor that allowed them to attain broad support. He believed that periods of crisis were essential to fascism's success, and that they used hollow rhetorical appeals to democracy and fearmongering about Bolshevism as a wedge to convince people to vote for authoritarianism. Breitscheid also acknowledged that the nationalism, antisemitism, and violence of Nazism were factors in its appeal. He did not consider the incoherency of the Nazi platform and coalition to be a threat to its stability. Indeed, he feared that they would be nearly impossible to dislodge if they achieved power, and on this basis he staunchly defended the SPD's toleration of the Brüning government.

He argued that the SPD could use its position to push solutions the economic crisis while dedicating energy to educating the masses; a two-pronged strategy to deprive the Nazis of their support base. The party, however, had few economic ideas and lacked the resources to engage the working class in such a manner. Despite this, he considered toleration to be the only viable course of action. As internal dissatisfaction with the policy intensified in late 1931, even Breitscheid began to look for alternatives: in a November speech, he suggested that cooperation with the KPD may be possible if it committed to shutting down its paramilitary wing. Nonetheless, he continued to endorse toleration publicly. He argued that the SPD could not be held responsible for Brüning's policies, and that they were acting out of obligation to the constitution in a parliament where the two other largest parties, the Nazis and KPD, were anti-constitutional. In his view, if the SPD were to bring down Brüning, they would be responsible for bringing an anti-constitutional government to power. At the same time, he opposed new elections, fearing they would strengthen Nazis and Communists.

Breitscheid supported the SPD's endorsement of President Paul von Hindenburg in his 1932 re-election bid, believing that he would defend the constitution and continue to deny the Nazis power as he had since 1930. In January 1933, however, Hindenburg appointed Hitler Chancellor. Breitscheid, who had spoken at times of extraparliamentary action by the Iron Front if the constitution was violated, refused to endorse this course of action as the Nazis took control of the state. He hoped that the SPD would be allowed to exist for a time, and that they might build their strength, though he made no attempt to imagine what that might entail. Re-elected to the Reichstag in the March 1933 election despite harsh repression, Breitscheid attended the session which saw the passage of the Enabling Act of 1933. He returned to Munich, where the SPD executive had been stationed since being pushed out of Berlin, and fled the country with his wife on 1 April.

== Exile, arrest and death ==
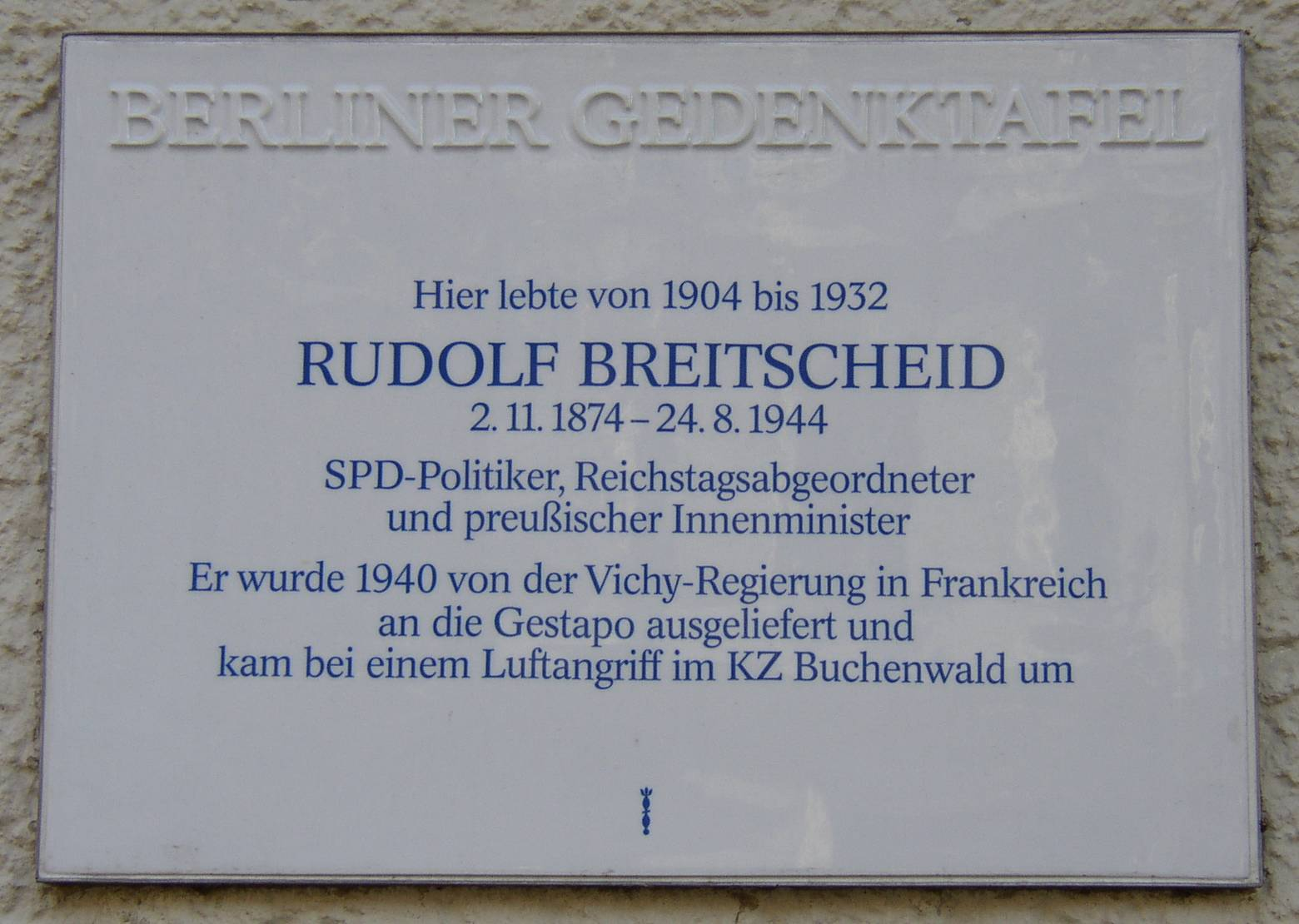
Memorial plaque to Breitscheid in Berlin stating that he died in an air raid on Buchenwald.

Breitscheid moved to Paris with his wife Tony in May 1933, where they spent the next seven years. He remained politically active, but was not part of the Sopade, the SPD's exile organisation. His efforts to organise a popular front with the KPD alienated him from fellow SPD comrades. During the invasion of France in May 1940, Breitscheid fled to Marseille with Tony and Rudolf Hilferding where, despite efforts by Varian Fry, they were unsuccessful in seeking visas to enter the United States. They were arrested by French police in September and placed under house arrest in Arles before Breitscheid and Hilferding were handed to the Gestapo in February 1941. Breitscheid was imprisoned for ten months in Berlin, then transferred to the Sachsenhausen concentration camp, then to Buchenwald in September 1943. Breitscheid died there on 24 August 1944, listed as being killed in an Allied air raid on the camp. However, Varian Fry believed that Breitscheid was executed by the Gestapo and his cause of death falsified. Communist leader Ernst Thälmann, who was also held in Buchenwald and secretly executed, was subject to a similar coverup. Breitscheid is commemorated at the Memorial to the Socialists (German: Gedenkstätte der Sozialisten) in the Friedrichsfelde Central Cemetery, Berlin.

Today, a square in the centre of Berlin is named after Breitscheid, while streets in Oberhof, Kaiserslautern, Potsdam, Leverkusen, Dresden, and other cities in eastern Germany bear his name.
