= Briefadel =

Persons ennobled by letters patent

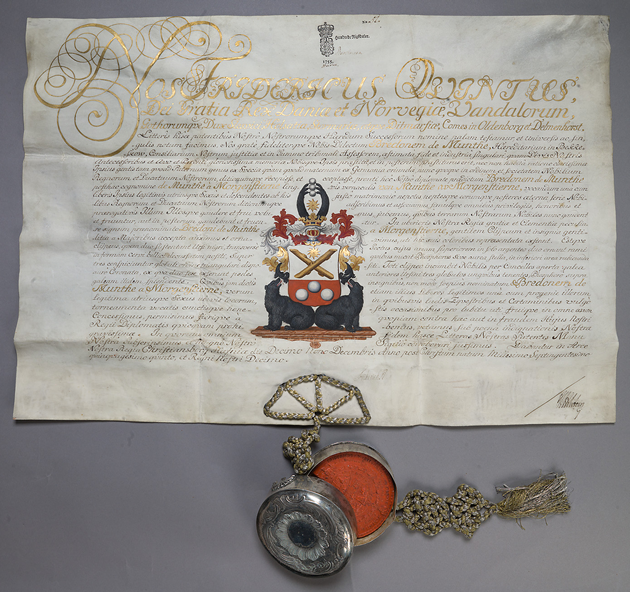
Letter of nobility from 1755 to the Munthe af Morgenstierne family of the Danish and Norwegian nobility

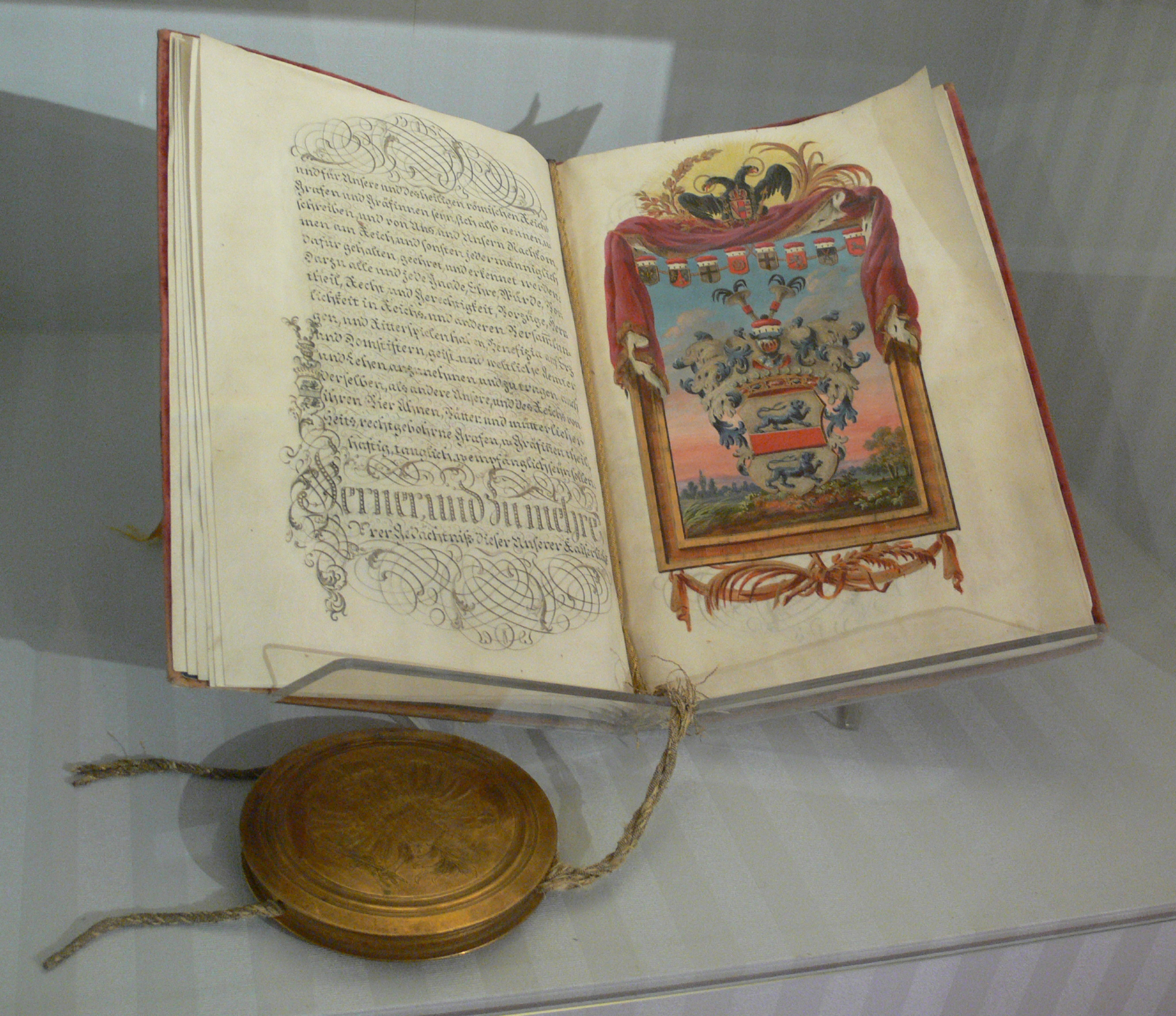
Patent from Emperor Joseph II awarding the title of Imperial Count to Anton Schenk von Stauffenberg, 1785

Briefadel (in German; pronounced [ˈbʁiːfʔaːdl̩]) or brevadel (in Danish, Norwegian, and Swedish) is a medieval German term for persons or families ennobled by letters patent. The oldest known such letters patent were issued in the middle of the 14th century, during the Late Middle Ages.

Briefadel can be contrasted with Uradel, whose nobility predates issuance of letters patent. The term dates to the early nineteenth century.

== See also ==
- Austrian nobility
- Danish nobility
- Finnish nobility
- German nobility
- Icelandic nobility
- Norwegian nobility
- Swedish nobility
