= Uradel =

German noble social class; ancient nobility

Facsimile of a German periodical of 1900 titled Mittheilungen an die Mitglieder des Geschlechtsverbandes des zum fränkischen Uradel gehörigen Geschlechtes Derer von Eberstein stammend vom "Eberstein" auf der Rhön.

Uradel (German: [ʔuːɐ̯ˈʔaːdl̩], German: "ancient nobility"; adjective uradelig or uradlig) is a genealogical term introduced in late 18th-century Germany to distinguish those families whose noble rank can be traced to the 14th century or earlier. The word stands opposed to Briefadel, a term used for titles of nobility created in the early modern period or modern history by letters patent. Since the earliest known such letters were issued in the 14th century, those knightly families in northern European nobility whose noble rank predates these are designated Uradel.

Uradel and Briefadel families may belong to any noble rank, including adlig (untitled nobility), freiherrlich (baronial), gräflich (comital), fürstlich (princely), and herzoglich (ducal).

The term Hochadel (High Nobility) refers specifically to the sovereign and mediatised princely and ducal houses of the Holy Roman Empire, rather than to all families bearing princely or ducal titles.

== Introduction and usage ==
The first use of the word Uradel to designate the oldest nobility dates from 1788, and it had assumed its present-day meaning by no later than 1800. The term Uradel was used officially from the 19th century by the Royal Prussian Herald Office (königlich-preußische Heroldsamt). The term is found in the Almanach de Gotha from 1907, in which it is applied to all persons and families known to have been "noble" or "knightly" before 1400. The subsequent German-language publications Genealogisches Handbuch des Adels (GHdA) and since 2015 the Gothaisches Genealogisches Handbuch continue to differentiate between Uradel and Briefadel families.

== Contemporary use ==
=== Germany ===
According to the German genealogical reference work of the nobility (Genealogisches Handbuch des Adels, 1951) the noble houses which count as Uradel are those families whose ancestral lineage can be demonstrated to date at least as far back as the year 1400 (in the Late Middle Ages), belonging at that time to the knightly (German ritterbürtigen) nobility.

The latter included both edelfreie families (free-born nobles) and ministeriales, the latter being a lower order of predominantly unfree origin which rose rapidly and, by the 14th century, had largely elevated itself into the ranks of the lesser nobility (see: Estates of the realm). The modern concept of aristocracy (Uradel) must not be confused with the term edelfrei, since the scope of the former is considerably broader: all families able to demonstrate membership within the knightly nobility by no later than around 1400—whether originally edelfrei or ministerial in origin—are today classified as Uradel. Indeed, many of the families included in the former Uradel volumes of the Gotha were of ministerial origin, including even certain later princely houses (Hochadel; see below).

Edelfrei families belonged to the ancient free nobility of the Empire: dynastic noble lineages independent of servile or ministerial origin, holding their lands by hereditary right and subject to no intermediary lordly authority beyond the German King or Holy Roman Emperor. In contrast, the ministeriales—originally meaning "servitors" or "agents"—were an unfree service class who nevertheless came to form a substantial portion of the German knightly order during the High Middle Ages. Trained as mounted warriors and administrators, they were elevated from dependent status into positions of military, judicial, and administrative responsibility in the service of princes, counts, bishops, and other territorial lords. From around 1200 onward, many ministerial families gradually accumulated power, landed fiefs, and political influence, in some cases surpassing sections of the older edelfrei knightly nobility. Less prosperous edelfrei lineages increasingly entered the service of territorial lords in exchange for offices, protection, and benefices. The great territorial magnates—many themselves of edelfrei origin—were often more inclined to strengthen their own authority through dependent ministerial service than to share power among competing noble peers, thereby drawing lesser noble families into relations of vassalage.

By the fourteenth century, the distinctions between edelfrei and ministerial families had become increasingly blurred through social integration, intermarriage, and shared participation within the knightly nobility. Those ministeriales who served directly under the German King or Holy Roman Emperor—the Reichsministerialen ("Imperial Ministerials")—frequently acquired extensive imperial fiefs, some later rising to comital or even princely rank.

Ministeriales generally advanced through elevation into the knightly estate. Knighthood was most commonly conferred upon squires who had distinguished themselves in battle as armoured horsemen, though it was at times also granted to men of more modest standing in military service. A ministerial lineage, however, came to be recognised as fully knightly only after several successive generations had maintained the status and way of life of the knightly nobility, including the practice of socially equal marriage alliances. Since it is a coincidence from what period of time documents have been received or not, the initially more strict definition, as described in Der Große Brockhaus in 1928 (vol. 1, s.v. "Adel"), which required an attestation prior to the year 1350 to establish Uradel status, has been extended to the year 1400 because even the knightly families documented as dating from the Late Middle Ages (between about 1350 and 1400) are likely to have had already at least a century of possessing that status. Many have in fact risen to noble or knightly status already before 1300.

Uradel is also closely connected with the system of medieval fiefs, granted by an overlord to a vassal who held it in fealty (or "in fee") in return for a form of feudal allegiance and service, usually given by the personal ceremonies of homage and fealty. Therefore feudal deeds are an important source not only for the existence of noble families, but also for their rank and status. Witness lists, for instance, mostly enumerate edelfreie witnesses first, followed by ministeriales witnesses, mostly denoted as eques (knight) or something similar.

In contrast, the younger Briefadel are families of the post-medieval nobility, probably originally of bourgeois (Bürger, burgher) or peasant origin, ennobled in the modern era by letters patent issued by a monarch, usually with the award of a coat of arms if they did not already have one. Said to have been modelled on the earlier French practice of raising officials (especially lawyers) to the aristocracy, the earliest letters patent conferring nobility in Germany were issued under Charles IV, Holy Roman Emperor, in the late 14th century.

=== Austria ===
A similar term used more often than Uradel in Austria is alter Adel ("old nobility").

=== Scandinavia ===
The term Uradel can be found in Scandinavian genealogy from the early 20th century. The contrasting term Briefadel was calqued as brevadel.

The 1926 edition of the Swedish Nordisk familjebok also cites 1350 as the required date, because "the oldest known letter patent dates to 1360". The letters patent referred to here is that issued by Holy Roman Emperor Charles IV to Wicker Frosch, a burgher of Frankfurt, on 30 September 1360. Svenska Akademiens ordbok mentions "circa 1420" as the threshold date. In Norway, one of the earliest known letters patent is of 1458.

== Hochadel (High Nobility) ==
Hochadel ("High Nobility") is not a synonym for Uradel. Whereas Uradel refers to noble families documented before 1400 and is contrasted with Briefadel (nobility created by letters patent after 1400), the distinction between Hochadel and Niederer Adel ("Lower Nobility") is based on rank and historical status rather than age.

Hochadel traditionally includes the sovereign houses of Europe (emperors, kings, grand dukes, dukes, and princes) and the mediatised princely and ducal houses of the former Holy Roman Empire, whose members retained equality of birth with reigning dynasties after 1806. Certain mediatised comital houses are also counted among the Hochadel.

The Almanach de Gotha distinguishes three groups within the Hochadel: (1) Europe's reigning houses; (2) the mediatised houses of Germany; and (3) titular princely and ducal houses that never exercised sovereignty.

Although most Hochadel families belong to the Uradel, a number of princely houses rose to high nobility after the medieval period, such as the Fugger, Eggenberg, Biron, Wrede, Bonaparte, Bernadotte, Torlonia, and Demidov families.

== See also ==
- Nobles of the Sword, approximate French equivalent
- Extended family
- Clan
