= Michael Georg Conrad =

German philosopher (1846–1927)

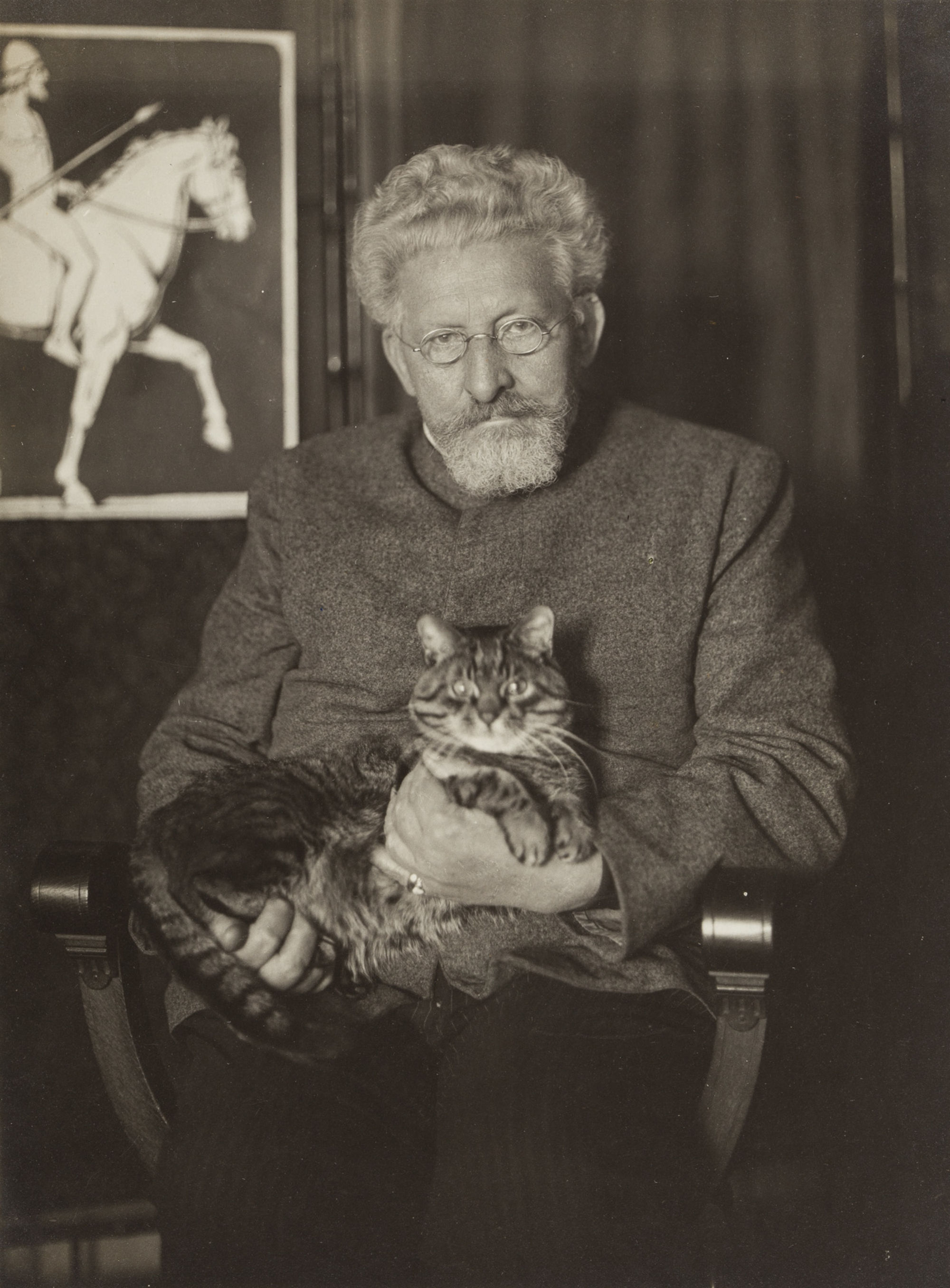
Michael Georg Conrad with cat (undated)

Michael Georg Conrad (5 April 1846 – 20 December 1927) was a German writer and philosopher. He was the founder and editor of Die Gesellschaft.
