= Die Gesellschaft =

Naturalist literary magazine in Germany (1885–1902)

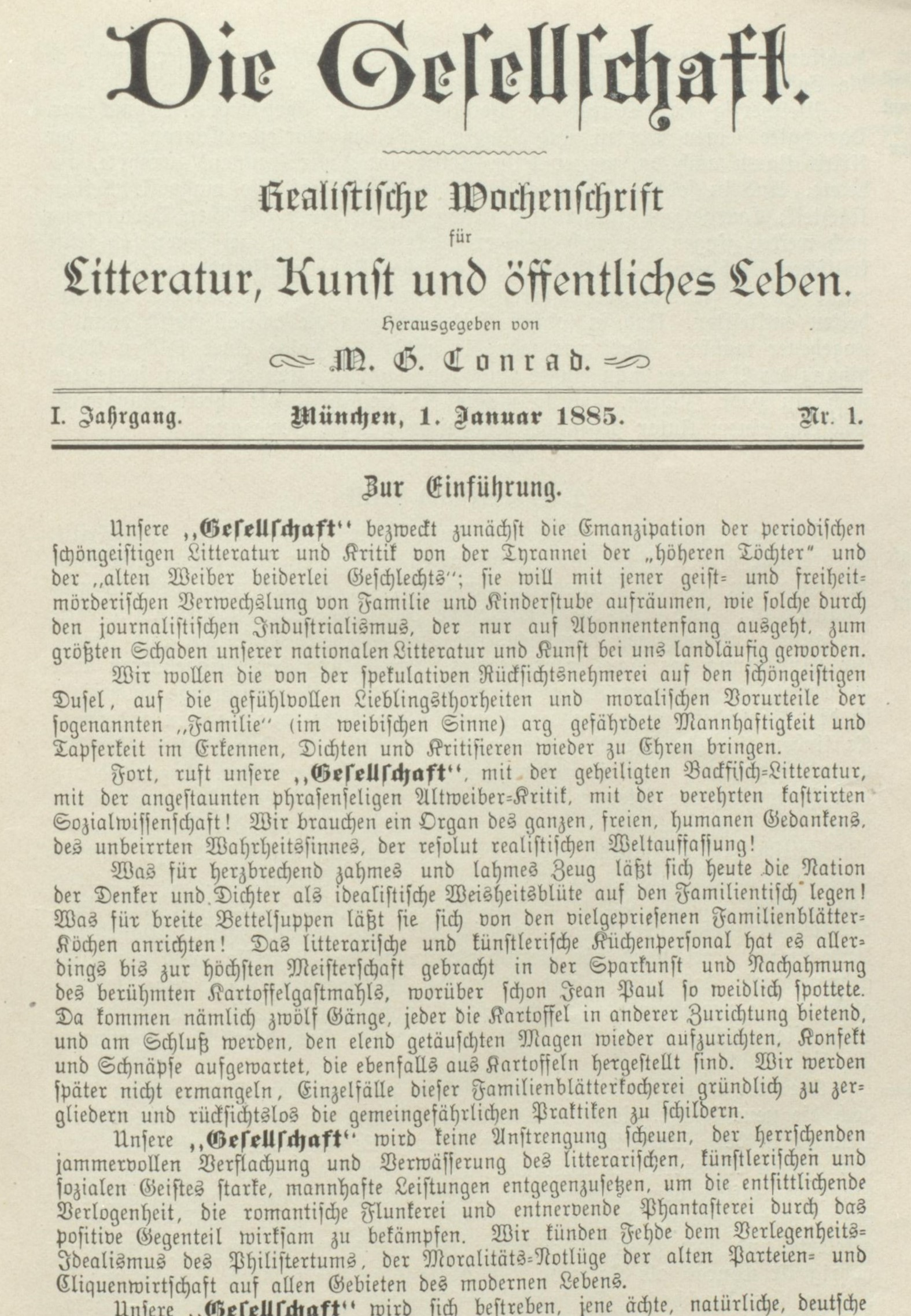
- Cover page dated January 1885
- Categories: Literary magazine
- Frequency: Monthly; Weekly
- Publisher: Friedrich Verlag
- Founder: Michael Georg Conrad
- Founded: 1885
- Final issue Number: 1902; 18
- Country: German Empire
- Based in: Munich; Leipzig
- Language: German

Die Gesellschaft (German: Society) was a magazine which was published in German Empire between 1885 and 1902. It billed itself as the "organ of contemporary literary youth". It is known for its strong support for naturalism and its founder and editor Michael Georg Conrad.

== History and profile ==
Die Gesellschaft was established by Michael Georg Conrad in Munich in 1885. Conrad and Karl Bleibtreu edited the magazine until its closure in 1902. The magazine came out weekly between its start in 1885 and 1891. Then it was published on a monthly basis. The first two volumes of the magazine were published by Conrad. From 1887 its publisher became the Leipzig-based Friedrich Verlag which was owned by Wilhelm Friedrich. Die Gesellschaft ceased publication in 1902 after producing 18 issues.

== Content and contributors ==
Die Gesellschaft featured articles on naturalism, literature, art and public life. One of its contributors was the German Georgist Michael Flürscheim who wrote about the program of the Land League. Another one was Anna Croissant-Rust who published short fictional proses employing a naturalist literary approach. Alfred Schuler was also among the contributors of the magazine.
