= List of Liberia-flagged cargo ships =

This list of Liberia-flagged cargo ships consists of vessels which are registered in Liberia and subject to the laws of that country. Liberia is the world's second most prolific flag state by both tonnage and number of ships, largely due to its status as a flag of convenience. A total of 2,496 bulk carriers, container ships, and general cargo ships flew the Liberian flag in 2021. Any ship which flew the flag at any point in its career, and is present in the encyclopedia, is listed here.

== List of ships ==
Name	Owner	Country	Year built	Type	Fate	Notes
Altavia	Herm. Dauelsberg		1994	General cargo	Sold for scrap in 2014.	
Amoco Cadiz	Amoco Transport Co.	United States	1974	VLCC	Sank after grounding on rocks in 1978	Caused the largest oil spill of the time
Avenue Star			2008	Bulk carrier		
Biscaglia	Winged Foot Shipping	Marshall Islands	1986	Chemical tanker	Scrapped in 2013	
MCP Altona	Intership Navigation Co	China	2007	Container ship		
MSC Cordoba	Mediterranean Shipping Company	International	2007	Container ship		
Salem	Pimmerton Shipping Ltd.	Liberia	1969	Supertanker	Scuttled off the coast of Guinea in 1980 to fraudulently claim insurance	
Sea Empress	Oriental Ocean Shipping		1992	Suezmax oil tanker	Scrapped in 2012	Ran aground off Wales in 1996, causing a major oil spill
Torrey Canyon	Barracuda Tanker Corporation	United States	1959	Suezmax oil tanker	Ran aground and sank off Cornwall in 1996, causing a major oil spill	
