= Dannielynn Birkhead paternity case =

Anna Nicole Smith daughter and heir, center of paternity suit

The Dannielynn Hope Marshall Birkhead paternity case, a.k.a. Birkhead v. Marshall, was a high-profile legal battle that revolved around the paternity of Anna Nicole Smith's daughter, Dannielynn. Larry Birkhead, Smith's former love interest, filed a lawsuit against Vickie Marshall (Anna Nicole Smith) and Howard K. Stern, Smith's live-in partner who was listed as the father on the birth certificate, seeking to establish his paternity rights. Dannielynn stood to inherit a substantial fortune if Smith's estate succeeded in its ongoing legal battle to claim inheritance from her late husband, an affluent oil tycoon. Given its significant implications and media coverage, the case involved various legal proceedings and garnered substantial public attention. G. Ben Thompson, a former boyfriend of Smith's who worked as a real-estate developer in South Carolina, claimed that pregnant Smith approached him to inform him that he was the father of her unborn child, but he balked telling Smith that was impossible because he had a vasectomy.

The case unfolded in multiple jurisdictions, primarily in the United States and the Bahamas. Smith and Stern were reportedly staying in the Bahamas to avoid paternity testing of her daughter in the U.S. The court hearings included DNA testing, testimonies from various individuals claiming to be the father, and arguments over custody and inheritance rights. The case was ultimately resolved when a DNA test confirmed Birkhead as the biological father of the child.

In addition to Birkhead and Stern, several individuals including bodyguard/actor Alexander Denk, Mark Hatten, and Frédéric Prinz von Anhalt, among others, claimed to be the father of Smith's daughter.

== Background ==
On September 7, 2006, Anna Nicole Smith gave birth to daughter Dannielynn in New Providence, The Bahamas. The paternity of the child immediately became a subject of dispute between Howard K. Stern, Larry Birkhead, and several other individuals.

=== Paternity claims ===
==== Larry Birkhead ====
Birkhead was a freelance celebrity photographer in Los Angeles, California. Birkhead denied receiving money for media interviews, though he has received royalties for archived pictures he took of Smith.

According to Birkhead's testimony on February 10, 2007, while on the stand, he and Smith dated on and off from August 2005 to February 2006.

==== Howard K. Stern ====
Stern was Smith's attorney who was named executor of her will which was drafted in 2001 by Eric James Lund, Esq. During the case, Stern denied that he had received money from media interviews he has conducted since Smith's death, though he admitted that he gave an interview to Entertainment Tonight on a flight that the show chartered immediately after her death. As a lawyer of Smith's in the continuing litigation over the estate of her late husband, billionaire J. Howard Marshall, he would be entitled to a contingent fee of roughly $5 million, five percent of any money she was awarded.

Following the death of the baby's half-brother Daniel Wayne Smith, Smith put Stern's name on the disputed second birth certificate issued for the baby then known as Hannah Rose.

In an interview on CNN's Larry King Live after the death of Smith's son, Stern said that he and Smith had been in a relationship for "a very long time", and claimed he was the father.

==== Frédéric Prinz von Anhalt ====
Frédéric Prinz von Anhalt, the husband of Zsa Zsa Gabor at the time, asserted that he had a 10-year-long affair with Smith. He claimed that he could potentially be the father of Smith's daughter and threatened to file a lawsuit if the courts granted custody to either Howard K. Stern or Larry Birkhead. On February 12, 2007, Prinz von Anhalt publicly announced his intention to pursue a paternity claim and acknowledged that his marriage might come to an end if his claims of being the father were proven true. Subsequently, on February 15, 2007, he submitted legal documents at a courthouse in Santa Monica, California, seeking a DNA test to establish whether he was the biological father of the baby.

On February 20, 2007, he took a lie detector test in his attorney's office in Los Angeles. Prinz von Anhalt passed three lie detector tests that week, according to his attorney. The tests included questions about whether he had an affair with Smith and whether he could possibly be the child's father. On March 23, 2007, he submitted a DNA sample to a Los Angeles clinic even though he was not involved in the paternity suit between Stern and Birkhead. He did not have a sample of the baby's DNA to analyze against, nor did he have a court order to submit to testing, but had stated that he wanted to be prepared if his paternity case had continued. On April 10, 2007, after the paternity test results were made public, representatives of Prinz von Anhalt released this statement wishing Birkhead well with raising the baby: "We never intended to take Dannielynn from anyone, we were just here in case Prinz von Anhalt was the father. We wish Larry luck in raising Dannielynn and we wish him the best."

==== Alexander Denk ====
Denk is an Austrian-American film actor and was the personal bodyguard of Smith until her death on February 8, 2007.

He revealed to the entertainment news show Extra that he had engaged in a two-year romantic relationship with Smith after he was hired to play the chef on The Anna Nicole Show and subsequently became her bodyguard. Denk said “there’s always a possibility” that he's Dannielynn's father when the interviewer directly questioned him about it.

When asked if Smith ever revealed to him the identity of her daughter's father, Denk responded, "She always told me she wanted to have her kids with me." Denk was not certain he was the baby's father and claimed that Smith "always told me I want you to be there and care for Dannielynn no matter what, no matter who is the father, because I took care of Anna with her health and everything, and she wanted to make sure her baby is healthy. And also this thing about the dieting and stuff, she doesn't want her baby to be overweight and obese. She wants to make sure she is healthy."

==== J. Howard Marshall ====
J. Howard Marshall II, also deceased, was Smith's second husband. In February 2007, the New York Daily News claimed to have seen an unpublished manuscript by Donna Hogan, Smith's younger half-sister, saying that Smith had become pregnant by Marshall: "To her family, she hinted that she had used the old man's frozen sperm, and would be giving birth to Marshall's child".

== Legal proceedings ==
The Birkhead v. Marshall case involved a series of legal proceedings and court hearings as Larry Birkhead sought to establish his paternity rights over Dannielynn. Birkhead initiated the legal process by filing a lawsuit against Howard K. Stern, who was listed as the father on Dannielynn's birth certificate. Birkhead asserted that he was the biological father and sought to prove his paternity through legal means. The court proceedings began in Broward County Circuit Court in Florida on February 21, 2007.

=== Disposition of Smith's remains ===
The disposition of Smith's remains became a significant aspect of the legal proceedings. Judge Larry Seidlin awarded custody of Smith's body to the lawyer acting as the guardian ad litem for Dannielynn. The judge declared that Smith should be buried in the Bahamas, next to her son Daniel Wayne Smith.

A Florida Appeals court suspended a lower court ruling that would have allowed Smith's burial in the Bahamas. The Fourth District Court of Appeals in Florida granted an emergency petition from Smith's mother Virgie Arthur, effectively halting the court-appointed guardian from transporting the body to the Bahamas.

In March 2007, Smith was buried in the Bahamas next to her son after Arthur lost an appeal against Judge Seidlin's ruling.

=== Birth certificates and name changes ===
On October 11, 2006, a second birth certificate for the baby, which had been a subject of dispute, was publicly revealed. Notably, this document disclosed a name change for the child, who was officially registered as Dannielynn Hope Marshall Stern on October 9, 2006. The decision to alter the name occurred after the death of Smith's son, Daniel Wayne Smith, a month earlier. Before the name change, the baby's records had initially identified her as Hannah Rose Marshall Stern from September 7, 2006, to October 11, 2006.

While Stern's name appeared as the father on the second birth certificate, a Bahamian attorney signed his name instead of Stern's own signature, rendering the certificate invalid. Consequently, the possibility arose for a new birth certificate to be requested and a DNA test to be conducted to ascertain the father's identity.

=== Paternity results and custody ===
The legal proceedings continued with DNA testing being conducted to determine the paternity of Dannielynn. On April 10, 2007, Michael Baird, the analyst of the March 21 DNA test, publicly declared the results. He confirmed that Birkhead had been determined to be the father of the baby with a 99.99% probability. Although DNA tests confirmed Birkhead as the father, the final custody of the baby remained unresolved. Stern did not contest Birkhead for custody. In April 2007, after the official paternity test results were released, Birkhead legally changed his daughter's surname to his own, resulting in her being renamed as Dannielynn Hope Marshall Birkhead.

== See also ==
- Family law
- Paternity fraud
