= Howard K. Stern =

American attorney based in California (born 1968)

- Born: Howard Kevin Stern; November 29, 1968 (age 57); Los Angeles, California, U.S.
- Education: B.A., University of California, Berkeley (1990); Juris Doctor (J.D.) degree from the UCLA School of Law
- Occupations: Attorney, agent
- Years active: 1994-present

Howard Kevin Stern (born November 29, 1968) is an American attorney based in California. He is specialized in the fields of bankruptcy law and recently criminal law. Stern is primarily known in bankruptcy law as the estate executor and the petitioner in the landmark Supreme Court case Stern v. Marshall, 564 U.S. 462 (2011). The decision fundamentally altered bankruptcy jurisdiction by limiting the authority of non-Article III bankruptcy judges to enter final judgements on certain state law counterclaims. The Supreme Court affirmed the lower court order in an opinion by Chief Justice John Roberts. It is a landmark Supreme Court case frequently included in legal textbooks, particularly those focusing on bankruptcy law, federal courts, and constitutional law. He was the attorney and agent of the late model Anna Nicole Smith. He became known as a co-star on Smith's 2002–2004 reality television series The Anna Nicole Show. As of 2019 Stern works with the Los Angeles Public Defender's Office.

== Early life ==
Stern was born and raised in Los Angeles, California. He attended Ulysses S. Grant High School in Van Nuys where he played football for the school team Lancers. He graduated with a B.A. degree from the University of California, Berkeley, in 1990 and received his Juris Doctor (J.D.) degree from the University of California, Los Angeles. He was admitted to the State Bar of California on February 25, 1994.

== Career and personal life ==
Stern's law firm first handled Anna Nicole Smith's modeling contracts in the mid-1990s. Stern met Anna Nicole Smith in 1998, after the death of her husband J. Howard Marshall. Stern was co-counsel in her litigation regarding the Marshall estate, he presented Smith direct examination at the trial. Stern's law firm was dissolved around the time he became a co-star on The Anna Nicole Show (2002 - 2004). Stern maintained an apartment in Santa Monica, California, from which he operated a business called Hot Smoochie Lips, Inc., a talent agency that had Anna Nicole Smith as a client.

On September 10, 2006, Stern was with Smith when her son, Daniel Wayne Smith, died in Nassau, Bahamas, while visiting his mother and newborn half-sister Dannielynn. Bahamian Police and the Inquest declared Daniel's death as an accidental overdose on antidepressants and methadone. No foul play was involved. On September 28, 2006, Stern and Smith exchanged wedding vows in a legally nonbinding ceremony in Nassau, Bahamas. The ceremony was officiated by a Baptist minister.

Smith died on February 8, 2007, less than five months after Daniel. According to the Florida court overseeing her estate, Smith left everything to Daniel in a 16-page will that named Stern as executor of the Estate.

On February 21, 2007, hearings commenced in Florida's Broward County Circuit Court over the disposition of Smith's remains. Denying motions by Smith's mother and Stern, the judge awarded custody of Smith's body to her infant daughter, Dannielynn Hope Marshall Stern via attorney whom the judge also appointed the baby's guardian ad litem. Smith was buried next to Daniel in the Bahamas.

=== Paternity dispute ===
In September 2006, Stern claimed in an interview with Larry King on CNN that he was Dannielynn's father; celebrity photographer Larry Birkhead also claimed that he was Dannielynn's father. Anna Nicole named Stern as the father on the Bahamian birth certificate and the daughter's name was listed as Dannielynn Hope Marshall Stern. After the death of Anna Nicole Smith in February 2007, it was revealed that Stern had custody of Smith's child, Dannielynn. Frédéric Prinz von Anhalt, the husband of the actress Zsa Zsa Gabor, alleged he could be the father of Smith's daughter and threatened to file a lawsuit for custody. Alexander Denk also claimed he could be the father of the baby. In April 2007, a Bahamian court determined through DNA testing that Larry Birkhead was Dannielynn's biological father. Stern announced that he would not contest the ruling and would help Birkhead obtain sole custody.

=== Prosecution for conspiracy and judgment of acquittal ===
On March 13, 2009, the California Attorney General and Los Angeles County District Attorney announced that they would be charging Stern, Dr. Sandeep Kapoor and Dr. Khristine Eroshevich of conspiring to "commit the crimes of prescribing, administering and dispensing controlled substances to an addict." They were not accused of causing Smith's death in 2007. The trial began August 4, 2010, in Los Angeles. Stern, Dr. Eroshevich, and Dr. Sandeep Kapoor pleaded not guilty. On October 28, 2010, Stern and Dr. Eroshevich were found guilty, but Kapoor was acquitted.

In 2011, judge Robert Perry dismissed Stern's conviction, indicating there was no evidence brought forth to prove Stern had intended to break the law by using assumed names to protect Smith's privacy. The single conviction which remained standing, a felony charge of fraud against Dr. Eroshevich, was reduced to a misdemeanor. In 2015, Perry dismissed the felony conviction against Stern for the second time. In his ruling, Perry exclaimed, "this case reeks of unfairness", adding he believed the prosecutors "seemed to have unfairly targeted Stern because he was a public figure" and noting that the trial had already cost the taxpayers in an excess of $500,000. "Howard Stern simply has been through enough ... I find there is no reason to permit this case to go forward," Los Angeles Superior Court judge Robert J. Perry told reporters.

=== Libel and defamation lawsuits ===
Powell Goldstein LLP represented Stern in the libel lawsuits against Rita Cosby; lawyer John O'Quinn who represented Smith's mother Virgie Arthur. The suit, filed in federal court in 2007 in Florida, alleges John O'Quinn, attorney for Virgie Arthur, defamed Stern in statements made on television after Smith's death. The suit also claimed O'Quinn hired private investigators to invade Stern's privacy and collude with Rita Cosby. They also represented Stern in a defamation suit filed by Virgie Arthur. The case was dismissed before the trial in 2010 after TMZ Productions, CBS, Stern and other defendants won summary judgments. Lin Wood represented Stern as executor of Smith's Estate in federal action against developer G. Ben Thompson of South Carolina, his son-in-law Ford Shelley Jr., lawyer Susan M. Brown for misappropriation and theft of estate property.

Journalist Rita Cosby alleged in her book, Blonde Ambition: The Untold Story Behind Anna Nicole Smith's Death, released on September 4, 2007, that Smith's nannies revealed that a sex tape existed of Stern and photographer Larry Birkhead engaging in homosexual relations. However, a lawyer for the nannies threatened to file a suit, claiming that the nannies never spoke about such an encounter between Stern and Birkhead. After that, Stern filed a $60-million libel suit against Cosby and her publisher in October 2007, a spokesperson for the nannies claimed Cosby had offered bribes in an unsuccessful attempt to contact the nannies. The suit says that the book falsely accuses Stern of, among other things: criminal lewd acts, homosexual acts, illegal possession and use of cocaine, conspiring to commit murder and kidnapping for ransom.

In July 2009, in a court hearing on whether to dismiss the lawsuit, Stern's attorney claimed that in deposition of the suits, Cosby admitted there was no videotape and could not prove other allegations. Cosby replied to the Stern lawsuit by saying "...we are solid on our facts more than ever... we are sure of what we have." In Cosby's videotaped deposition given in a libel suit against her filed by Stern, Cosby said her sources for the gay sex tape were private investigators Don Clark and his associate, Wilma Vicedomine. They were hired by attorney John O'Quinn who represented Virgie Arthur. O'Quinn had used the same strategy before in corporate litigations, a death by a thousand cuts, Lin Wood explained.

In August 2009, federal judge Denny Chin ruled that: "Cosby's actions are extremely troubling, and suggest that she was attempting to obstruct justice by tampering with witnesses" and allowed most of Stern's lawsuit against Cosby to proceed, but dropped her publisher, Hachette, as defendant. Hachette, offered Cosby an advance of $405,000 plus royalties. Three months later, the lawsuit was withdrawn as settled, but no information has been released on the terms of this out of court settlement.
