= Hans Hermann Weyer =

German title dealer (1938–2023)

Hans-Hermann Weyer-Graf von Yorck, né Hans Hermann Weyer (22 April 1938 – 15 August 2023) was a German title dealer. Popularly nicknamed der schöne Konsul lit. 'the handsome Consul', he was renowned for his jet-setting lifestyle and was a tabloid fixture from his rise to fame in the 1970s to his death.

== Life and career ==
Hans Hermann Weyer was born into a well-off family in Berlin in 1938. He later claimed that his father, a Luftwaffe officer, named him after Hermann Göring (allegedly a family friend and his godfather). During the Second World War, his father was taken prisoner on the Eastern Front, only to return from Soviet captivity in 1955. In the meantime, his mother remarried a British officer, Clifford Davis, who Weyer would claim introduced him to the world of diplomacy. He apprenticed as a window-dresser in Hamburg and later began working in imports before purchasing a soft drinks business. He was imprisoned in 1961 on fraud charges, after which he moved to Munich.

Weyer eventually found that his father relocated to Uruguay after his release; it was in South America where Weyer was able to establish his lucrative business selling honorary consulships. He himself became the honorary consul of Bolivia (1963) and Special Envoy of Liberia in Germany; in the latter position, he was in the lucrative position to preside over Liberia's German flagging operations. Most of the hundreds of honorary consular positions he sold were on the behalf of small or impoverished countries. In South America, he established personal contacts with Paraguay's then-dictator Alfredo Stroessner.

Weyer was most prolific in his sale of false doctorates and even professorships, often to German businessmen. He also began to sell fabricated certificates of nobility and orders of chivalry into which he inducted his clients. In 1978, Weyer claimed to have sold "350 doctoral degrees, 76 certificates of nobility, 80 consular titles and 23 other orders of distinction."

However, his most high-profile business would only be established after a brief prison sentence for tax fraud. In 1979, he began selling noble titles, particularly through marriage to or adult adoption by impoverished German nobles. Weyer charged hundreds of thousands of dollars in exchange for arranging adult adoptions, often with the additional requirement that clients pay their adopters a monthly fee. Perhaps his best-known "noble" client was Frédéric Prinz von Anhalt né Hans Robert Lichtenberg, who later married Zsa Zsa Gabor. Weyer made frequent media appearances from the 1970s onward, often dressed in elaborate self-designed costumes and regalia, contributing to his fame and notoriety in Germany and abroad. Weyer made extensive use of promotional photos depicting him in a range of costumes and locales, i.e. a mercenary leader in Africa or real estate developer in Greece.

For a short time, Weyer made headlines as chairman and candidate for chancellor of the Deutsche Freiheitspartei (DFP), founded in Munich on 18 November 1979. According to its own information, the party had 26,000 members. The DFP ran in the 1980 Bundestag election with only one direct candidate in the constituency of Freising and received 96 votes. In 1980, he moved to Asuncion, Paraguay, where his relationship with Stroessner allowed him to escape extradition on further fraud charges. His office there was hung with portraits of Stroessner and Nazi decorations. He was apparently extradited in 1984, but only returned to Germany in 1988, after charges had been dropped.

In 1991, Weyer married the physician Christina Scholtyssek (b. 1963) in Rottach-Egern. Scholtyssek was a daughter of the diplomat Karl-Heinz Scholtyssek. In 1996, after selling countless titles to others, he finally had himself adopted by a Countess of Yorck, making his surname "Weyer-Graf von Yorck", although his wife retained her "Weyer" surname. In the early 2000s, the couple moved to Rio de Janeiro, although the Weyers would frequently travel to Europe. Weyer continued to be a fixture of the German tabloids, and appeared in advertisements for Onken GmbH in the 1990s.

Hans Hermann Weyer died on 15 August 2023 in Rio de Janeiro at the age of 85.

== Works ==
- Zypern heute. Weyer/Austria 1967.
- Schwarz-rot-goldene Titelträger. Ein indiskretes Handbuch für die große Karriere. Munich 1971 (together with Joachim Hemmann and Richard Kerler)
- Ich, der schöne Consul. Karrieren für die Wunderkinder. Goldmann Verlag, Munich 1986, ISBN 3-7770-0426-X.

== Records ==
- C’est La Vie, Ma Chérie · Du hast so lange nicht gelacht
- Von Hamburg nach Hawaii (only shown on cover)

== TV ==
- Titel, Orden, Consulate (RTL, 1991, 8 episodes)

== Literature ==
- "Der Dekorateur", Der Spiegel, 22 December, 1990
