= List of ship launches in 1994 =

The list of ship launches in 1994 includes a chronological list of all ships launched in 1994.

| Date | Ship | Class / type | Builder | Location | Country | Notes |
|---|---|---|---|---|---|---|
| 3 January | Tarquin Ranger | LNG tanker | Appledore Shipbuilders Ltd. | Appledore | United Kingdom | For Pentland Gas Carriers Ltd. |
| 20 January | Erradale | Bulk Carrier | Harland & Wolff | Belfast | United Kingdom | For China Navigation Company. |
| 27 January | Datteln | Frankenthal-class minehunter | Kröger | | Germany | For German Navy |
| 29 January | Fitzgerald | Arleigh Burke-class destroyer | Bath Iron Works | Bath, Maine | United States | |
| January | Putlos | Todendorf-class securing boat | Lürssen | Bremen | Germany | For German Navy |
| 1 February | Ramage | Arleigh Burke-class destroyer | Ingalls Shipbuilding | Pascagoula, Mississippi | United States | |
| 16 February | Fuyushio | Harushio-class submarine | | | Japan | |
| 24 February | Baumholder | Todendorf-class securing boat | Lürssen | Bremen | Germany | For German Navy |
| 4 March | Hanit | Sa'ar 5-class corvette | Ingalls Shipbuilding | Pascagoula, Mississippi | United States | For Israeli Navy |
| 12 March | Courbet | La Fayette-class frigate | | | France | |
| 20 March | Tucson | Los Angeles-class submarine | Newport News Shipbuilding | Newport News, Virginia | United States | |
| 26 March | Hoy Head | Ferry | Appledore Shipbuilders Ltd. | Appledore | United Kingdom | For Orkney Islands Council. |
| 26 March | Le Triomphant | Triomphant-class submarine | DCNS | Cherbourg | France | |
| 21. April | Homburg | Frankenthal-class minehunter | Kröger | | Germany | For German Navy |
| 6 May | Deneb | de:Vermessungs-, Wracksuch- und Forschungsschiffe des BSH | Peene-Werft | Wolgast | Germany | For Federal Ministry of Transport and Digital Infrastructure |
| 7 May | Charles de Gaulle | Aircraft carrier | DCNS | Brest | France | |
| 26 May | Dillingen | Frankenthal-class minehunter | Abeking & Rasmussen | | Germany | For German Navy |
| 3 June | Sol do Brasil | Ouro do Brasi-class carrier | Kvaerner Keven Florø | | Norway | |
| 8 June | Schleswig-Holstein | Brandenburg-class frigate | Howaldtswerke-Deutsche Werft | Kiel | Germany | For German Navy |
| 11 June | Knock Dun | Suezmax Tanker | Harland & Wolff | Belfast | United Kingdom | For Fred Olsen & Co. |
| 11 June | Oak Hill | Harpers Ferry-class dock landing ship | Avondale Shipyard | Avondale, Louisiana | United States | |
| 17 June | Stethem | Arleigh Burke-class destroyer | Ingalls Shipbuilding | Pascagoula, Mississippi | United States | |
| 17 June | Dole Africa | Stocznia Gdanska B369 reefer | Stocznia Gdańska | Gdańsk | Poland | For Reefership Marine Services |
| 25 June | Winnipeg | Halifax-class frigate | Saint John Shipbuilding | Saint John, New Brunswick | Canada | |
| 25 June | Somerset | Type 23 frigate | Yarrow Shipbuilders | Glasgow | United Kingdom | |
| 30 June | Oriana | Cruise ship | Meyer Werft | Papenburg | Germany | For P&O Cruises |
| 30 June | Bayern | Brandenburg-class frigate | Nordseewerke | Emden | Germany | For German Navy |
| 9 July | Mindoro | VLCC | Daewoo Heavy Industries | | South Korea | IMO 9073050 |
| 16 July | Maine | Ohio-class submarine | Electric Boat | Groton, Connecticut | United States | |
| 23 July | Carney | Arleigh Burke-class destroyer | Bath Iron Works | Bath, Maine | United States | |
| 23 July | Patuxent | Henry J. Kaiser-class replenishment oiler | Avondale Shipyard | Avondale, Louisiana | United States | |
| 28 July | Oruçreis | Barbaros-class frigate | Gölcük Naval Shipyard | | Turkey | |
| 30 July | Superfast I | Ro/Pax Ferry | Schichau Seebeckwerft | Bremerhaven | Germany | For Superfast Ferries |
| July | Munster | Todendorf-class securing boat | Lürssen | Bremen | Germany | For German Navy |
| 12 August | Showboat Branson Belle | Riverboat/showboat | | Table Rock Lake, Missouri | United States | |
| 18 August | Alice PG | Tanker | Appledore Shipbuilders Ltd. | Appledore | United Kingdom | For G. W. Pritchard-Gordon. |
| 23 August | Murasame | Murasame-class destroyer | | | Japan | |
| 26 August | Yueh Fei | Cheng Kung-class frigate | China Shipbuilding | Kaohsiung | Taiwan | |
| 4 September | Legend of the Seas | Vision-class cruise ship | Chantiers de l'Atlantique | Saint-Nazaire | France | For Royal Caribbean International |
| 16 September | Anzac | Anzac-class frigate | Tenix Defence | Williamstown, Victoria | Australia | |
| 17 September | Greeneville | Los Angeles-class submarine | Newport News Shipbuilding | Newport News, Virginia | United States | |
| 24 September | Altavia | Cargo ship | Gdynia Shipyard | Gdynia, Poland | Poland | |
| 24 September | Columbia | Los Angeles-class submarine | Electric Boat | Groton, Connecticut | United States | |
| 1 October | Charlottetown | Halifax-class frigate | Saint John Shipbuilding | Saint John, New Brunswick | Canada | |
| 5 October | Myōkō | Kongō-class destroyer | Mitsubishi Heavy Industries | Nagasaki | Japan | |
| 5 November | Grafton | Type 23 frigate | Yarrow Shipbuilders | Glasgow | United Kingdom | |
| 9 November | Benfold | Arleigh Burke-class destroyer | Ingalls Shipbuilding | Pascagoula, Mississippi | United States | |
| 6 December | Nordfriesland | ferry | Husumer Schiffswerft GmbH | Husum | Germany | For Wyker Dampfschiffs-Reederei Föhr-Amrum GmbH |
| 20 December | Psara | Hydra-class frigate | Hellenic Shipyards Co. | Skaramagas | Greece | |
| 29 December | Transeuropa | Hansa-class ferry | Stocznia Gdańska S.A. | Gdańsk | Poland | For Poseidon Schiffahrt OHG |
| Unknown date | Impulse | Tug | David Abels Boatbuilders Ltd. | Bristol | United Kingdom | For Port of London Authority. |
| Unknown date | Mai | Ferry | David Abels Boatbuilders Ltd. | Bristol | United Kingdom | For private owner. |
