= Rita Cosby =

American television anchor and author

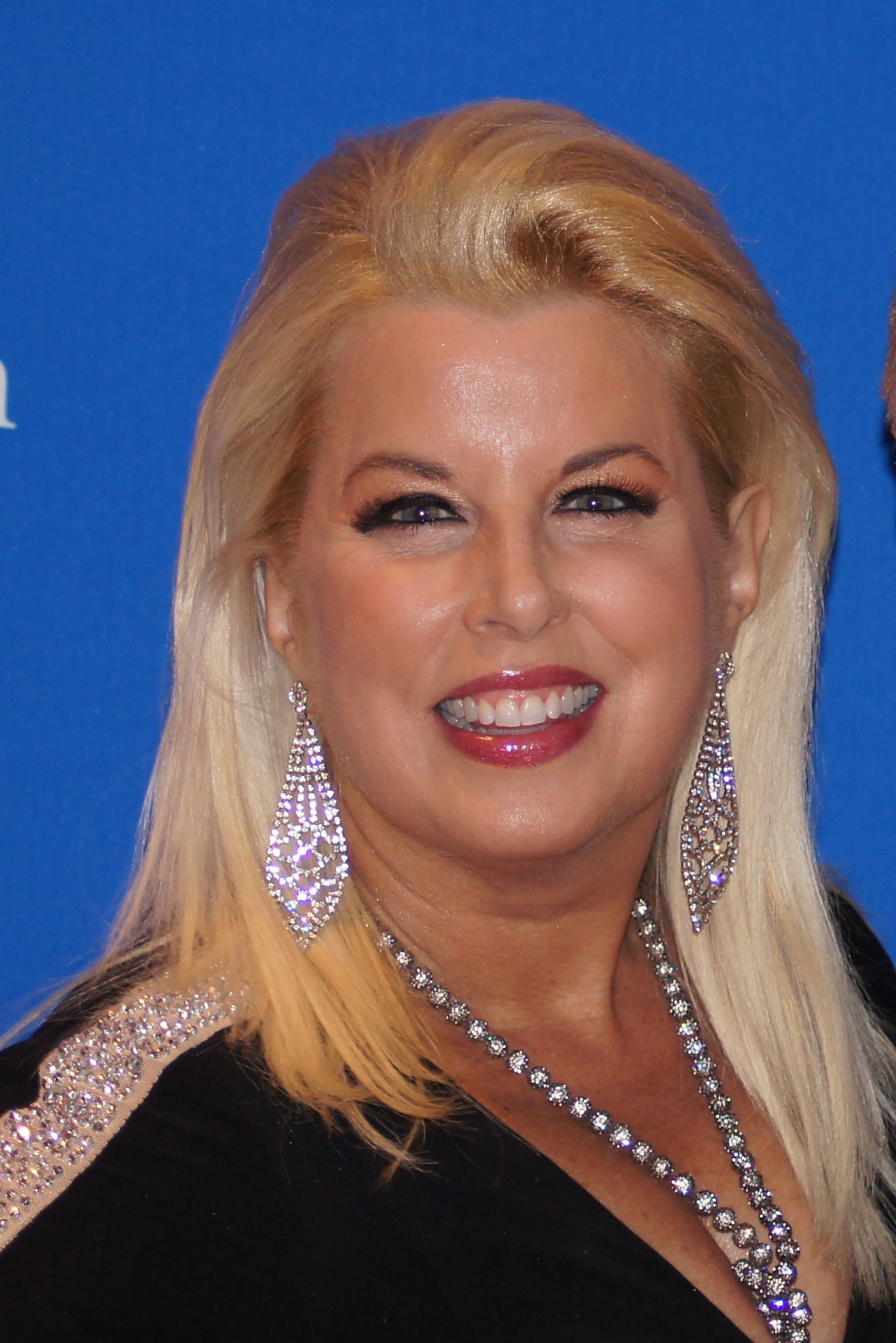
- Cosby at the White House Correspondents Dinner in 2019
- Born: November 18, 1964 (age 61); Brooklyn, New York, U.S.
- Occupation: Television journalist
- Notable credit(s): The Big Story Weekend Edition and Fox News Live with Rita Cosby (1995–2005) Rita Cosby Live & Direct anchor (2005–2007) Inside Edition special correspondent (2007–present)

Rita Cosby (born November 18, 1964) is an American television news anchor for Fox, MSNBC and NewsMax, as well as a best selling author. She is a host on the two-hour news show Saturday Report on Newsmax and a special correspondent for the CBS syndicated program Inside Edition, specializing in interviewing newsmakers and political figures. Cosby has the Jack Anderson Award for investigative excellence, the Matrix Award, the Ellis Island Medal of Honor, and the Lech Walesa Freedom Award. October 11, 2010, was declared "Rita Cosby Day" in the State of New York for her “extraordinary journalism and exemplary service on behalf of her community.”

== Biography ==
The daughter of a Danish mother and a Polish father Richard Cosby (Ryszard Kossobudzki) who came to the United States after World War II, Cosby was born in Brooklyn, New York. She grew up in Greenwich, Connecticut, where she attended Greenwich High School and freelanced for the local paper. She earned her bachelor's degrees from the University of South Carolina. Cosby balanced college with a position at WACH-TV, the local FOX affiliate. After an internship working for Dan Rather on the CBS Evening News, Cosby found work as an anchor/reporter at KERO-TV in Bakersfield, California, and WBTV in Charlotte, North Carolina.

=== Fox News Channel ===
From 1995 to 2005, Cosby worked at Fox News. At Fox, she hosted both The Big Story Weekend Edition with Rita Cosby and Fox News Live with Rita Cosby.

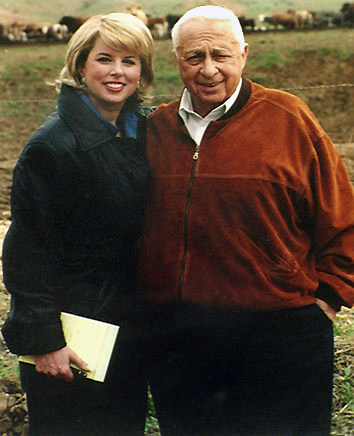
Rita Cosby with Ariel Sharon.

She has interviewed over twenty world leaders, conducting historic back-to-back interviews with Palestinian leader Yasser Arafat and Israeli Prime Minister Ariel Sharon. She was the first reporter to see prisoners held at Guantanamo Bay. She also interviewed Serbian president Slobodan Milošević who called her from his prison cell at the Hague. Years earlier, while broadcasting live from Belgrade during the NATO bombing, she broke the news that three American POWs were going to be released.

Cosby also made national headlines for her interviews with boxer Mike Tyson, singer Michael Jackson and convicted serial killer David Berkowitz, "The Son of Sam," who wrote to her during the Washington, D.C. sniper shootings in October 2002. As that story unfolded, Cosby secured another major first, by reporting the names and license plate numbers of the sniper suspects. In 2001, Cosby's interview with flight attendant Anne Marie Smith led to a U.S. Attorney's Office investigation of Rep. Gary Condit for obstruction of justice and witness tampering.

Cosby served as a lead reporter during the 1996 and 2000 Presidential campaigns. During the Monica Lewinsky investigation, she broke the news that President Bill Clinton was about to be subpoenaed to testify before the grand jury. After receiving an exclusive letter from Timothy McVeigh, who carried out the Oklahoma City bombing, she was granted a rare meeting with Pope John Paul II to discuss death penalty issues.

=== MSNBC ===
In 2005, Cosby moved to MSNBC to host a primetime weeknight show, Rita Cosby Live & Direct. It became the network's highest-rated show that year, and she did extensive reports for other NBC programs, including The Today Show. She traveled for the network, originating live for several weeks from New Orleans and the Gulf Coast region to report on Hurricanes Katrina and Rita, as well as from the war zone in Afghanistan and along the U.S.-Mexico border. On February 8, 2007, Cosby broke the news on the death of Anna Nicole Smith. She conducted the last broadcast interview with former Crips gang leader Stanley “Tookie” Williams and was one of a few journalists to witness his execution at San Quentin Prison. Additionally, she conducted rare interviews with Erik Menendez and Dr. Jack Kevorkian, both also behind bars. She left the network in 2007 to pursue other media offers and projects.

=== Other media activities and appearances ===
Since 2009, she co-hosts the worldwide broadcast of The National Memorial Day Parade simulcast to all US military installations around the globe. Well known in the Mideast, Cosby also interviewed candidates about foreign policy on Israel's TV show, The Ambassador. Additionally, Cosby has co-chaired various events internationally, including the Intersec Security Conference in Dubai in 2009. and the Euro-American Women's Council Forum in Greece in 2010. She was selected by Cosmopolitan Magazine as a “Fun and Fearless Female.” Cosby is heard daily on her WOR Radio program called The Rita Cosby Show. Cosby's interviews have included: Jimmy Carter, Dick Cheney, Mitt Romney, Ross Perot, Governor Andrew Cuomo, Mark Burnett and former President Donald Trump.

Since 2022, Cosby has hosted the weekly two-hour news show Saturday Report on Newsmax, replacing previous host Carl Higbie

== Publications ==
Cosby has authored two books.

=== Blonde Ambition ===
On September 4, 2007, Cosby released a book about Anna Nicole Smith, Blonde Ambition: The Untold Story Behind Anna Nicole Smith's Death. The book details the circumstances around the death of the model in 2007. The book has become a New York Times bestseller. In October 2007, Howard K. Stern, Smith's former attorney and agent filed a $60 million libel and defamation lawsuit against Cosby and her publisher for her claims that Stern and father of Smith's daughter were involved in homosexual relationship and that there was a videotape of their alleged relationship. In July 2009, in a court hearing whether to dismiss the lawsuit Cosby admitted there was no videotape and could not prove allegations that Stern was involved in criminal activities regarding Smith's death. New York Federal court judge Denny Chin ruled that Cosby's actions were extremely troubling, and suggest she was attempting to obstruct justice by tempering with witnesses. The defamation lawsuit was withdrawn and settled in November 2009. The terms of the settlement were confidential.

=== Quiet Hero ===
In 2010, Cosby released a memoir, Quiet Hero: Secrets From My Father’s Past. The book became a best-seller on several lists, including The New York Times, USA Today, and The Washington Post. The book details her father's youth as a Polish Resistance fighter who battled the Nazis during the Warsaw Uprising in World War II. In 2010, a resolution was passed in the South Carolina Legislature honoring Rita Cosby and her father. The book has raised money for the USO to help wounded soldiers and their families.
