= Marcus Prinz von Anhalt =

German businessman (born 1966)

- Born: Marcus Frank Adolf Eberhardt; 20 December 1966 (age 59); Pforzheim, West Germany
- Other name: Prinz Marcus
- Relatives: Frédéric Prinz von Anhalt (adoptive father)

Marcus Prinz von Anhalt (born Marcus Frank Adolf Eberhardt; 20 December 1966), more commonly known as Prinz Markus, is a German businessman, nightclub and brothel owner, whose luxurious lifestyle results in some coverage in the German yellow press.

== Early life and career ==
Prinz von Anhalt was born Marcus Frank Adolf Eberhardt on 20 December 1966, in Pforzheim, Germany, allegedly to a wealthy family. Prinz von Anhalt claims his parents owned a jewelry store, before their business was declared bankrupt and the family lost vast amounts of their wealth. At age 13, Eberhardt held many jobs, and left school at 16 to become an apprentice butcher. He started a cleaning service, which was a subsidiary for the butcher business, and was receiving a combined income of 6000 Deutsche Mark at age 16. He completed another apprenticeship to become a chef, opening several restaurants and starting an interior design business.

Eberhardt further diversified his organization by opening several table-dance bars and gentlemen's clubs in the United States. He later bought several brothels, earning the nickname "red-light king." After this investment, Eberhardt was charged with money laundering, tax fraud and human trafficking.

He is one of the largest and most visible owners of brothels in Germany, with over twenty brothels and night clubs. He has served four years in prison, for human trafficking and tax evasion. He claims to be a millionaire "in the three digit range," owning about 40 cars, real estate in Los Angeles (a mansion in Bel Air he shared with Zsa Zsa Gabor and Frédéric Prinz von Anhalt), Fort Lauderdale, Pforzheim, St. Gallen, Dubai and Monaco, and to have 12 bodyguards and 25 servants.

== Adoption and title ==
In 2006, he bought his name for several million U.S. dollars by being adopted by Frédéric Prinz von Anhalt, husband of Zsa Zsa Gabor, who had himself obtained his name by adoption. The adoption and name change did not confer any actual title or nobility. "Prinz von Anhalt" is a surname (literally Prince of Anhalt), rather than a title, as per German laws abolishing the country's former nobility in 1919. Furthermore, the House of Ascania does not recognize Marcus Prinz von Anhalt as a member. He likes to refer to himself as "Prinz Germany". His brothers by adoption include Oliver Prinz von Anhalt, Michael Prinz von Anhalt and Markus Maximilian Prinz von Anhalt. His sister by adoption is Francesca Hilton, who is the stepdaughter of his adoptive father and birth daughter of his adoptive mother. In 2008, he organized the "Royal Race", a tour of expensive cars and prominent drivers across Europe. Pamela Anderson was his partner at the race. In February 2009 he was seen having lunch with her in Los Angeles. In 2009, when Zsa Zsa Gabor lost a substantial amount of money to Bernie Madoff's Ponzi scheme, he helped out with a cheque for $6 million.

== Imprisonment ==
In November 2014 Marcus Prinz von Anhalt was sentenced to prison again. The judgement is not legally binding yet. While appealing the sentence, Prinz von Anhalt spent two years in detention.

The prison sentence of 4 years was based on charges of tax evasion and fraud. The prosecution had accused Prinz von Anhalt of tax evasion of 1.5 million Euros. The prosecution had put forward an estimation of monetary damages for the tax authorities by Anhalt of Euro 747,000 and another attempt to evade taxes of Euro 820,000. In particular, the prosecution accused von Anhalt that he declared the private usage of his 14 luxury cars (all of a value of at least 1 Million Euros) and vacations in Las Vegas as professional and business expenditures towards the tax authorities. Von Anhalt argued that "his glamorous lifestyle" is part of his profession as a "TV star" and that therefore, he merely used his luxury cars for "representational" reasons, stating: "Driving in my Porsche, Ferrari and Rolls-Royce and traveling to a show in Las Vegas occurred for professional reasons only." In addition, von Anhalt attempted to persuade the judge and the prosecution that if he did commit tax evasion, then it must have been unintentional as he did not fully understand the German tax laws at the time concerned, stating: "I know that the German tax laws are extremely complicated and maybe even the most complicated in the world. Some people may be able to understand the German tax laws but he is not one of them; but he knows how to successfully manage a brothel". The judges did not believe von Anhalt's explanations and consequently imposed a prison sentence of 4 years. Von Anhalt had declared previously that "he does not see a criminal offense in his case" and that the sums he supposedly evaded from tax authorities are "petty" and "ridiculous" given that "his brothels and disco clubs generate revenues in the two digit million range."

In prison it was discovered that von Anhalt had sent a letter to an acquaintance where he would insult the district attorney who had represented the prosecution in Von Anhalts trial. Von Anhalt had stated in the letter that "the district attorney is probably the dumbest district attorney in the world, that he has serious personal issues, that he squints and is poky and he merely is a cheap George Clooney wannabe." Von Anhalt was consequently imposed a fine of 60,000 Euros.

== Connections to Hells Angels ==
Marcus Prinz von Anhalt reportedly has connections to the Hells Angels with whom von Anhalt engaged with in the past as business or security partners for his brothels.

== Animal abuse ==
Marcus Prinz von Anhalt is frequently criticized by animal rights activists, such as PETA, for animal abuse. He owns a private zoo in Dubai, where several wild animals such as tigers or white lions, are kept under poor conditions and are treated as toys.

In August 2023, von Anhalt posted a video on Instagram that showed him hitting his pet tortoise by kicking a soccer ball at it. Because of this animal abuse, the District Court Frankfurt sentenced von Anhalt to a 400,000 Euro fine and also forbade him to personally hold any pets for at least three years.

== See also ==
- Prostitution in Germany
