= British Rail Class 60 =

Class of diesel electric locomotives

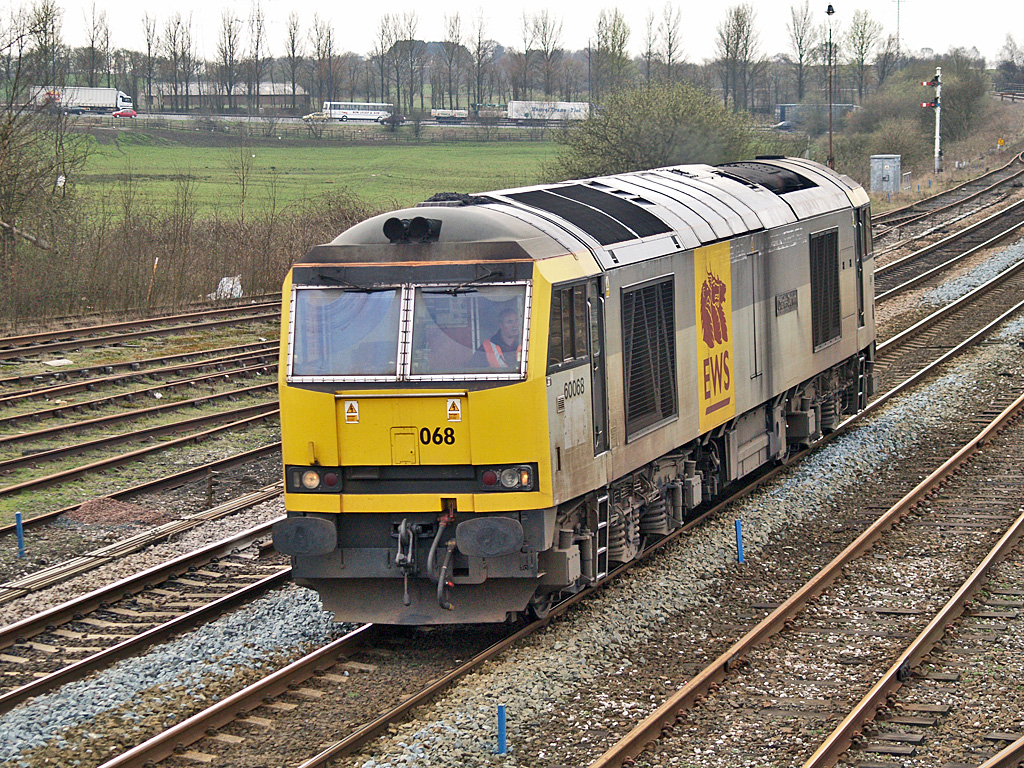
- An EWS Class 60 at Castleton East Junction
Type and origin
- Power type: Diesel-electric
- Builder: Brush Traction, Loughborough
- Build date: 1989–1993
- Total produced: 100
Specifications
- Configuration
  - UIC: Co′Co′
  - Commonwealth: Co-Co
- Gauge: 1,435 mm (4 ft 8 1/2 in) standard gauge
- Minimum curve: 80 metres (4.0 chains)
- Wheelbase: 15.3 m (50.2 ft)
- Length: 21.34 m (70 ft 0 in)
- Width: 2.64 m (8 ft 8 in)
- Height: 3.95 m (13 ft 0 in)
- Loco weight: 129 t (127 long tons; 142 short tons) or 131 t (129 long tons; 144 short tons)
- Fuel capacity: 5,900 litres (1,300 imp gal; 1,560 US gal)
- Prime mover: Mirrlees Blackstone 8MB275T
- Displacement: 18,100 cm^{3} (1,100 in^{3}) per cylinder
- Alternator: Brush BA1006A
- Traction motors: 6× Brush TM2161A
- Cylinders: 8
- MU working: Within own class only
- Train heating: None
- Train brakes: Air
Performance figures
- Maximum speed: 60 mph (97 km/h)
- Power output: Engine: 3,100 bhp (2,300 kW) at rail: 2,415 bhp (1,801 kW)
- Tractive effort: Maximum: 106,500 lbf (474 kN)
- Brakeforce: 62 kN (13,900 lb_{f}) or 74 kN (16,600 lb_{f})
Career
- Operators: British Rail; DB Cargo UK; DCRail; GB Railfreight
- Numbers: 60001–60015; 60017–60100; 60500 (originally 60016)
- Axle load class: Route availability 8
- Disposition: 7 in service, 87 stored, 3 preserved, 3 scrapped

The British Rail Class 60 is a class of Co-Co heavy freight diesel-electric locomotives built by Brush Traction. They are nicknamed Tugs by rail enthusiasts.

During the 1980s, it became increasingly apparent that British Rail required a more capable Type 5 locomotive for its heavy freight trains. Dissatisfaction with the British Rail Class 56's reliability led to the stipulation of a 95 per cent availability, a stringent requirement at the time. A total of three bids were received to a competitive tender issued on 10 August 1987; of these, Brush Traction's submission was selected and an order for 100 locomotives was issued during the following year. Despite the first example being completed during June 1989, due to a number of technical issues discovered during testing, the first examples of the Class 60 would not enter revenue service until late 1990. At a cost of £1.5 million each, the locomotives were the largest single expenditure in a restructuring of the Railfreight sector of BR, which over a three-year period, saw a £264 million annual loss turned into a £44 million profit through management changes and traffic-specific organisation.

Operating during the final years of British Rail, the entire Class 60 fleet became the property of English Welsh & Scottish (EWS) following the privatisation of British Rail during the mid-1990s. While the company was reportedly unimpressed by the type's performance, it was retained for heavy freight duties while much of the fleet was stored and subsequently sold on to other operators. Between 2004 and 2007, typically between 50 and 75% of the fleet would be out of action at a given time. However, during November 2010, EWS's successor, DB Schenker, announced that a portion of the fleet would be overhauled, referring to such units as Super 60s and extending their service life through to around 2025. Not all Class 60s received such overhauls however. During 2020, a Class 60 became the first example of the type to be scrapped, while another became the first to be preserved.

== History ==
During the early 1980s, British Rail operated several different diesel locomotives that had been categorised as Type 5, these being a relatively high-powered locomotive suited to heavy freight trains, such as the Class 56 and Class 58. However, the Class 56 proved to be somewhat unreliable, contributing to dissatisfaction amongst British Rail's customer base. One such customer, Foster Yeoman, became so disillusioned with the locomotives supplied for its aggregates trains that it procured its own private fleet of Class 59 locomotives from General Motors Electro-Motive Division in the United States. British Rail was reportedly interested in acquiring its own fleet of Class 59 locomotives, but hesitated in fear of objections by trade unions that such an order would not support British manufacturers. To avoid causing tension, BR decided that it should continue to support domestic suppliers when making new orders.

These various factors drove British Rail to produce a stringent requirement calling for a new Type 5 diesel locomotive for use on its Trainload Freight sector. In terms of its basic configuration, it sought a high-powered low-speed locomotive suitable for its existing core traffic operations. Furthermore, this requirement stipulated that the tentative locomotive would be required to maintain an average availability of no less than 95 per cent, which was far higher than any locomotive to have been operated by British Rail at that time. It was believed that the high performance levels demanded would generate considerable cost reductions, as well as significantly bolstering efforts within British Rail's rail freight division to meet targets set out by the British government. It was forecast that 100 of these new locomotives could replace 236 older ones of various types, including classes 20, 33, and 47, many of which would be withdrawn or cascaded onto other duties.

Despite having discounted a direct purchase of the Class 59, during the research phase, some of the concepts for the Class 60 were reportedly modelled upon its design. Inspiration was also drawn from the French rail freight industry. Roughly a dozen designs were studied, based upon staff feedback and market research; a total of three were carried through to the advanced stages of study, during which mock-ups were produced. A late-stage decision to reduce the size of the engine compartment enabled the redesign of the cabs at either end of the locomotive.

On 10 August 1987, the British Railways Board issued a competitive tender for response by 7 November, for a fleet of 100 locomotives. A total of six companies were invited to tender, these being Brush Electrical Machines, GEC Transportation, General Motors, General Electric, Metro-Cammell and NEI Consortium. Of these, only three companies chose to respond with a bid by the November 1987 deadline:

- Metro-Cammell – offered a Metro-Cammell body with an option of traction packages, many untried, and could not offer performance guarantees as stipulated by the tender
- General Electric Company – a partnership with General Motors Electro Motive. They offered a state-of-the-art Class 59, built in the UK, probably at Crewe Works, which had an existing partnership for construction of the Class 91 electric locos
- Brush Traction – offered a locomotive powered by either a Mirrlees or Ruston engine, and used separately excited (Sepex) traction control, as previously tested on the Class 58.

Of the three bidders, Brush's submission was selected as the winner. On 17 May 1988, the placement of an order for 100 locomotives with Brush valued at £120 million was announced by Paul Channon, the Secretary of State for Transport. Production of the type commenced quickly thereafter. Brush decided to subcontract much of the component manufacturing work, while performing final assembly of each locomotive at its erecting shops at Loughborough. The bodyshell of the Class 60, which was shared with the Class 92 electric locomotives, was fabricated by Procor (UK) of Wakefield. The engine was a higher-powered development of the Mirrlees engine, which had been previously fitted experimentally to Class 37 nos. 37 901-37 904.

On 1 July 1989, less than 14 months following the order's announcement, the first locomotive departed Brush, having been formally handed over to British Rail in a ceremony held the day beforehand. Specific areas that required redesign work included the control software, suspension system, and structural elements; reportedly, there were in excess of 100 individual faults ultimately identified, resulting in a threat of the order's cancellation being issued unless the outstanding problems were rectified. It would take two years before 60 001, the first member of the class, would be available for traffic. As a consequence of needing to make modifications, none of the Class 60s were used operationally until the following year.

During late 1990, British Rail accepted the first pair of locomotives into revenue service. Initially, the Class 60s were divided amongst several sectors of British Rail; 42 locomotives were assigned to coal traffic, while 13 were tasked with construction trains, along with 17 locomotives for moving metal trains and a further 17 for petroleum movements. A further seven were used during the construction of the Channel Tunnel, before being reassigned to general construction duties. During March 1993, the final locomotive of the class was accepted into traffic.

== Design ==
=== Bodywork ===
Unlike the Classes 59 and 66 (solid girder underframe) the Class 60s have a monocoque stressed skin construction with diagonal trusses – with the external bodywork providing support for the internal components.

Two different cab designs were considered and full size mock-ups were made in wood, plastic and metal by the Engineering Development Unit at the Railway Technical Centre in Derby. One of these had a French-style Nez Cassé cab, but this was rejected in favour of a more conventional cab.

=== Electrical ===
The main alternator is a Brush BA1006A type, providing power for the traction motors via rectification circuits to DC. The auxiliary alternator is Brush BAA 702A Auxiliary Alternator, providing power for the radiator fans, lubrication and fuel oil pumps, traction motor cooling fans and air compressors amongst others. The main and auxiliary alternators are both driven by the main engine.

Each of the six axles is driven via a reduction gear by one nose suspended axle hung traction motor (Brush designed and built the TM2161A four-pole motors). Each motor has a separate microprocessor-controlled power supply (SEPEX in Brush's designation – from "Separately Excited"), a system that was first tried on one Class 58, 58050, allowing the speed of a slipping axle to be reduced without affecting the others.

=== Prime mover ===
The engine is an eight-cylinder, 145-litre (8,800 cu in) Mirrlees Blackstone 8MB275T four-stroke diesel traction engine. The Mirrlees engine was one of the most fuel efficient available at the time (189 g of fuel per kWh), but relatively heavy. The engine was also successfully installed in marine applications such as small ships and passenger ferries. The low cylinder count for the rated power was expected to result in lower maintenance costs.

Engine dimensions

- Eight cylinders in line
- Bore, 275 mm (10.8 inches)
- Stroke, 305 mm (12.0 inches)
- Power output, 3,100 hp (2,300 kW) at 1,000 rpm

== Current operators ==
=== GB Railfreight ===
In July 2018, GB Railfreight bought all ten of Colas Rail's Class 60 locomotives, Colas having replaced them with a further seven orders for Class 70 locomotives.

=== DCRail ===
In March 2019 DCRail acquired four locomotives from DB Cargo; 60 028, 029, 046, 055. These have been overhauled by DB Cargo at Toton TMD with 60 046 the first to enter service in November 2019. Two later overhauls, 60099 and 60022, joined the fleet in 2025 and 2026 respectively.

=== ESH Rail / EPR Ltd ===
On 1 July 2026, it was announced that ESH Rail (Enviro Skip Hire) had purchased 63 of the 64 locomotives owned by DB Cargo UK. ESH then purchased the two Class 60s which were in private ownership and moved them to Boden Rail Engineering at Colwick for component recovery. ESH Rail were looking for an operating license and came to an agreement with EPR to purchase their Freight Operating Company before the end of the July.

== Former operators ==
=== British Rail ===
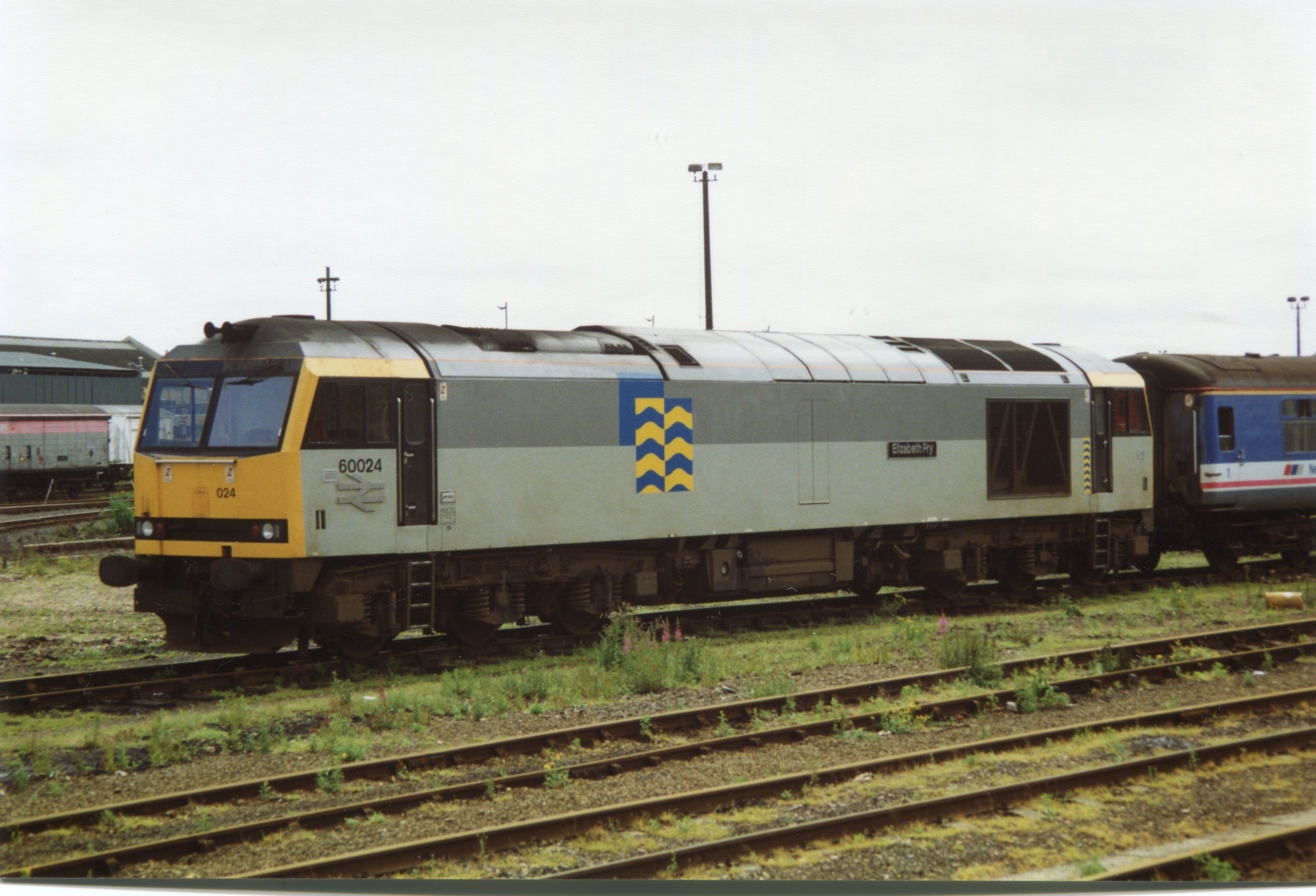
60 024 Elizabeth Fry at Eastleigh

By the end of 1990, 12 members of the class had been introduced to revenue service. The first locomotives to be accepted into traffic were 60 017 and 60 018 in October 1990. Their introduction replaced double-heading and also allowed longer and/or heavier trains to be worked. The type enabled the replacement of previously double-headed Class 33 Type 3s in the South East region, as well as Classes 20, 26, 27, 31 and 73. The relatively youthful Class 58 fleet were also cascaded from the coal traffic they had been the staple of. During March 1993, the final locomotive of the class was accepted into traffic.

In preparation for the privatisation of British Rail, the organisation's freight business was divided into five separate units; of these, three would operate the Class 60. Mainline Freight were assigned 52 of the type, while Loadhaul and Transrail Freight received 31 and 17 Class 60s respectively. These entities only briefly existed before their purchase by English Welsh & Scottish (EWS), thus transferring all members of the Class to a single private sector operator.

=== English, Welsh and Scottish (EWS) ===
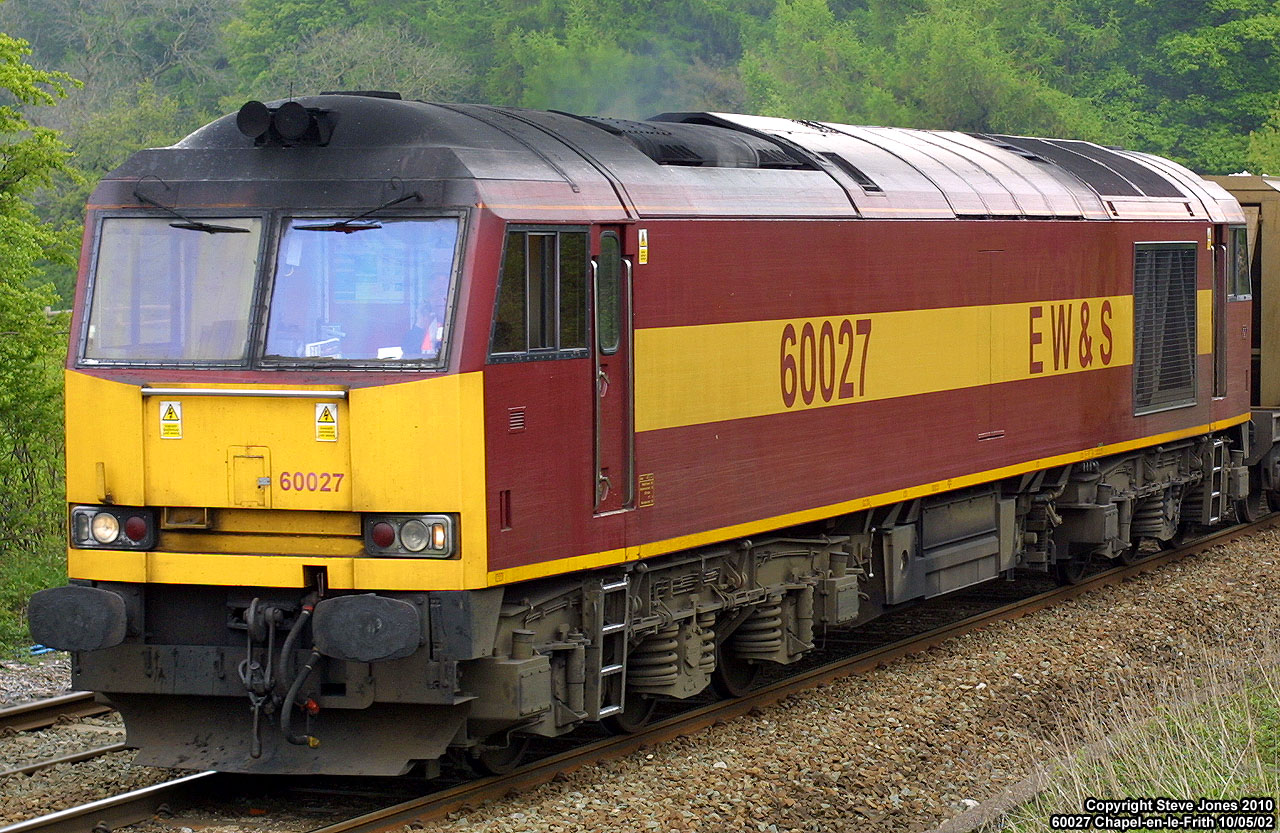
60 027 at Chapel-en-le-Frith in 2002

Following the privatisation of British Rail, all 100 units came under the management of the English Welsh & Scottish (EWS). Reportedly, the company was not impressed by the Class 60's performance, having a generally disfavourable attitude towards all of British Rail's locomotives. During most of 2003 and 2004, a portion of the fleet entered storage, having been deemed to be surplus to requirements. (Note: At the same time the Class 47, 56 and 58 fleets were withdrawn and the Class 37 fleet reduced ("Rolling stock : Class 60". Archived from the original on 5 February 2012. see 2000 to present day)) It was in 2004 that the first locomotive of the class was reportedly withdrawn, being retained by the company and gradually stripped for parts.

Between 2004 and 2007, typically between 50% and 75% of the fleet would be out of action at a given time. (Note: During this period the Class 60s saw more work during the winter, and higher numbers available for work – owing to the seasonal demand for fuel oil.) During 2007, the operational fleet was estimated to be 60 locomotives. While members of the fleet were reaching the milestone of 20,000 operating hours, at which point an overhaul was required, no authorisation for this work was given, with individual locomotives being rotated instead. This allegedly led to operational numbers dropping as low as four locomotives. According to Rail Magazine, there were suspicions that the whole class was close to being permanently withdrawn around this time, although the Class 60 was noted to have superior performance to the newer British Rail Class 66 when hauling particularly heavy freight trains.

=== DB Cargo UK ===
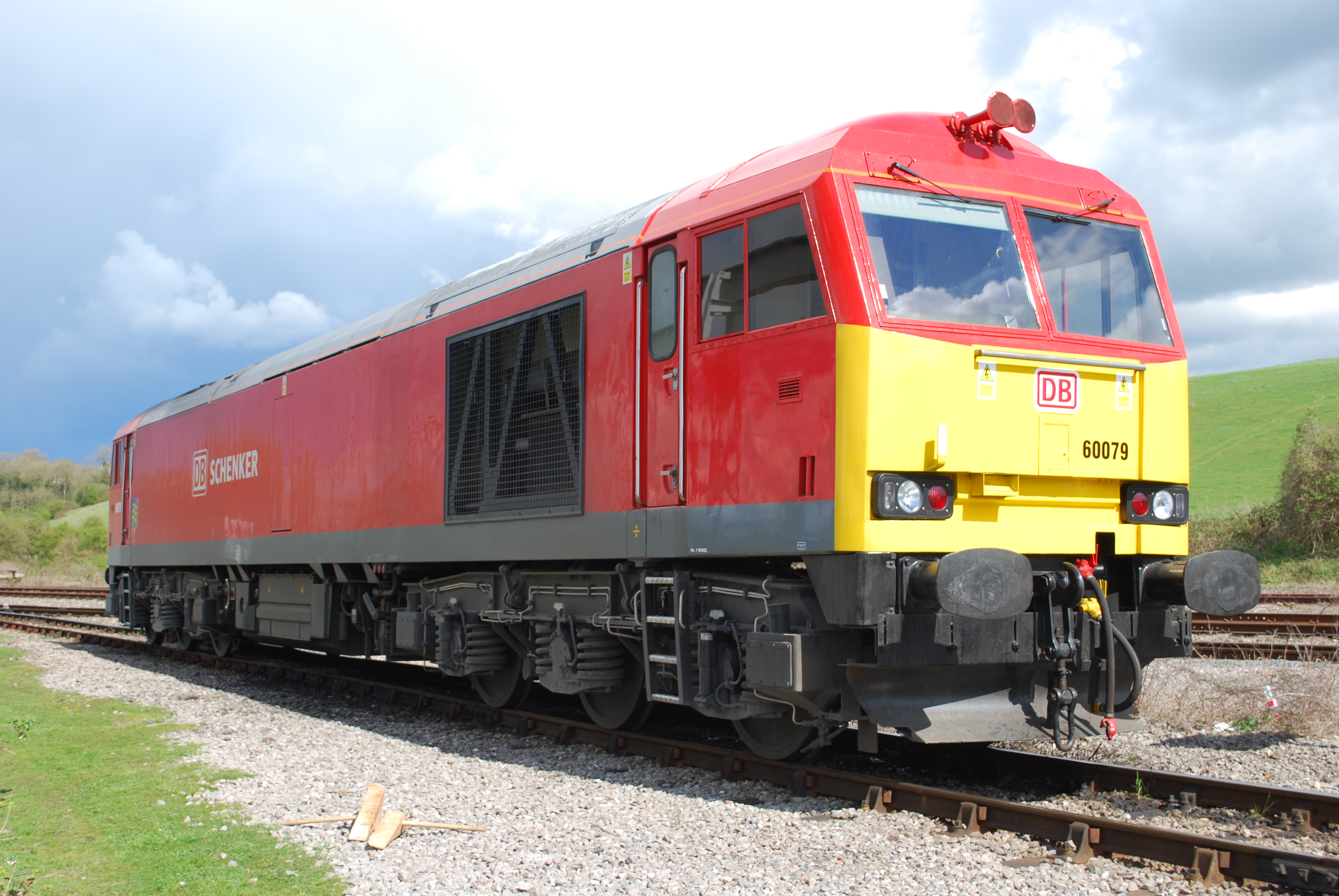
60 079 (Westerleigh, 2012)

In June 2007, EWS was acquired by DB Schenker, a wholly owned subsidiary of the German railway company, Deutsche Bahn. During September 2010, twenty of the class were offered for disposal by DB Schenker UK. Many of the locomotives marked for disposal had sustained catastrophic failures or were otherwise in a poor condition.

During November 2010, DBS announced that a batch of 20 units would receive overhauls. According to Rail Magazine, rumours that the company was interested in replacing the Class 60's engines were prevalent around this time. In January 2011, DB Schenker announced that seven units would undergo overhauls, along with an option to overhaul a further fourteen members of the class; this work reportedly extended the fleet's operational life by 15 years. During January 2013, the overhaul programme was described as an "upgrade" to create a new fleet of "Super 60's". This programme involved the complete overhaul, but not total replacement, of the locomotive's engine, as well as the refurbishment of various elements, including the traction motors, bogies, control gear, cabs, and electrical systems.

The overhaul work was performed primarily at the Toton Traction Maintenance Depot, DB Schenker's principal maintenance base in Britain. Locomotives which had gone through the Super 60 program by September 2013 included (17); 60 007, 010, 015, 017, 019, 020, 024, 039, 040, 054, 059, 062, 063, 074, 079, 091, 092, with another four programmed later that year; 60 001, 044, 066 and 60 100, although its unclear if all of these were completed. Those Class 60s that had been decommissioned were not anticipated to ever be overhauled.

In 2019, DB Cargo UK offered 60 006, 050, 060, 081 and 086 for sale, stored at Toton. All found buyers with three, initially, sold to metal recyclers (60 006 & 086 sold to Ron Hull, Rotherham, 60 050 to Raxstar) and 60 060 & 081 to 'Private Sales'. On 20 January 2020 60 006 was scrapped at Toton, the first of the class to be scrapped. On 10 February 2020, 60 086 was transferred to the Wensleydale Railway and into preservation. This was followed by 60 050; however, both locomotives were later sold back out of preservation to ESH Rail Services as spares donors.

=== Colas Rail ===
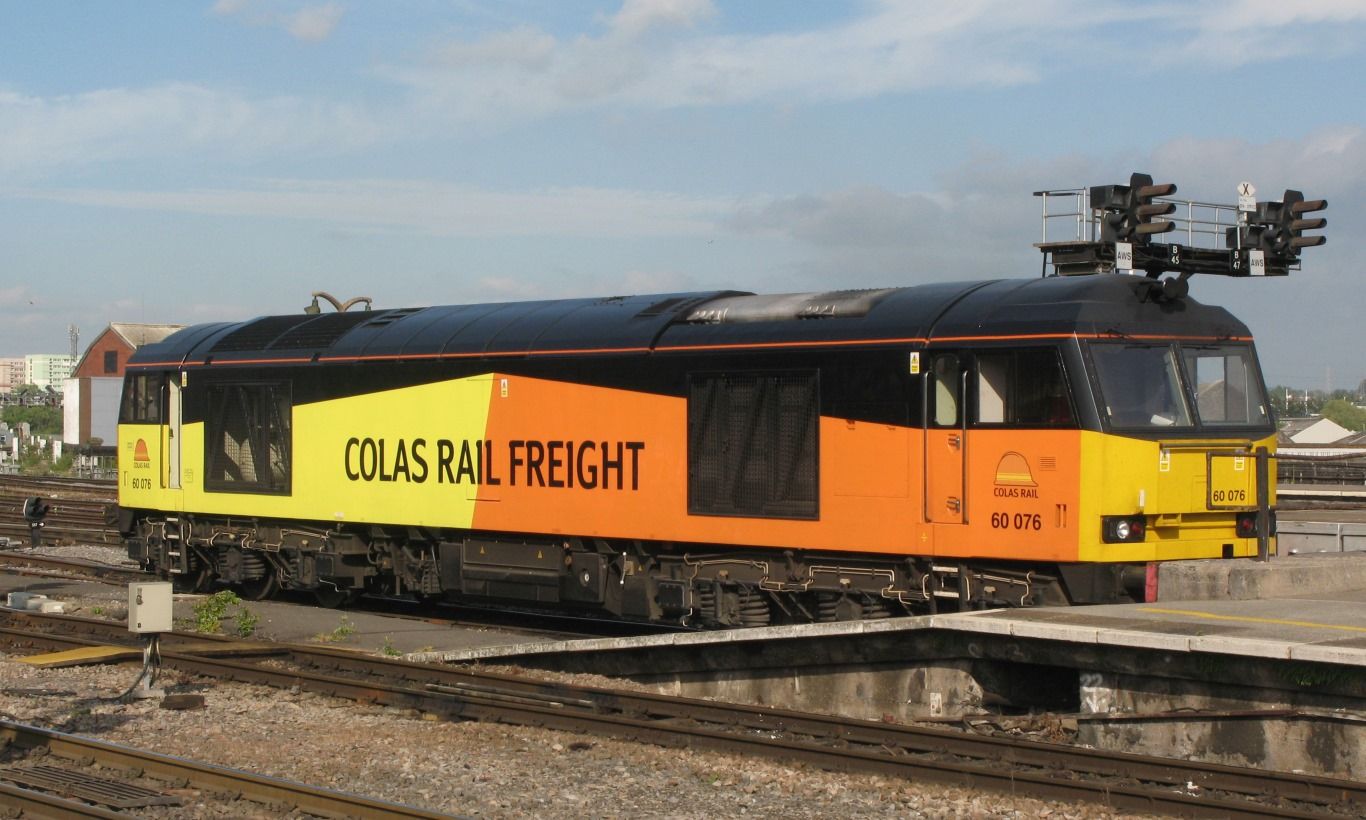
60 076 (Bristol, 2015)

In June 2014, it was reported that 10 locomotives had been sold to Colas Rail. The numbers are 60 002/021/026/047/056/076/085/087/095/096. The first one to appear in the Colas yellow and orange livery was 60 087, which was photographed at Burton-on-Trent on 2 June 2014. In July 2018, Colas Rail sold all 10 of its locomotives to GB Railfreight.

== Accidents and incidents ==
- On 30 June 2015, 60 054 was hauling a tanker train that derailed at Langworth, Lincolnshire due to buckled track.
- On 26 August 2020, 60 062 Stainless Pioneer was hauling a tanker train that derailed and caught fire at Morlais Junction, near Llangennech, Carmarthenshire.

== Naming and liveries ==
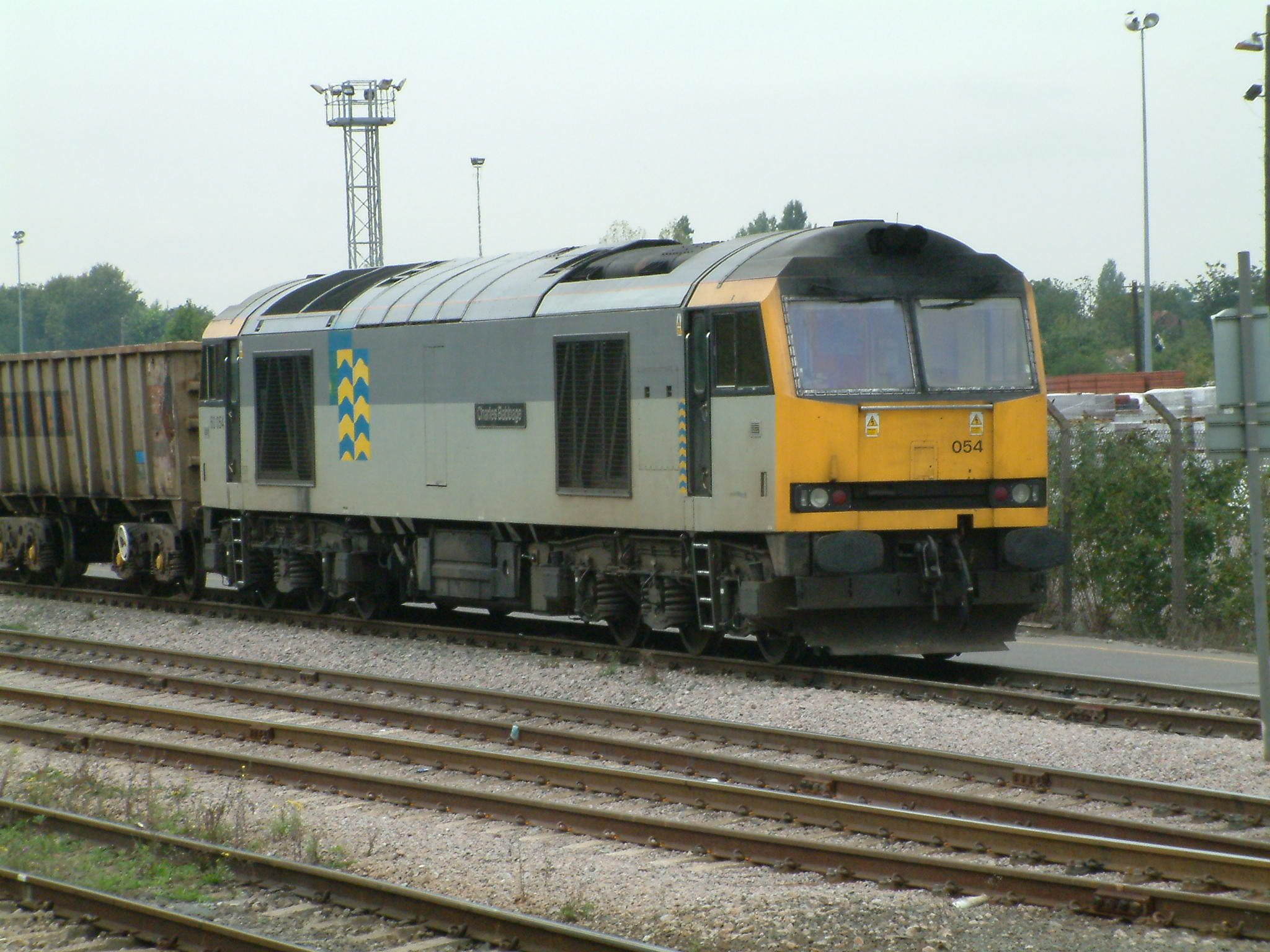
60 054 named Charles Babbage

In 1989 Railfreight named the Class 60s in traditional fashion; those locomotives attached to the construction and metals sectors were named after British mountains as were some attached to the coal sector. The others (coal and petroleum sectors) received the names of famous British citizens, with an emphasis on those whose contribution had been to science and engineering. Locomotives numbered 60 001 and 60 098 were exceptions, being named Steadfast and Charles Francis Brush respectively. The locomotives received the standard liveries of their respective sectors.

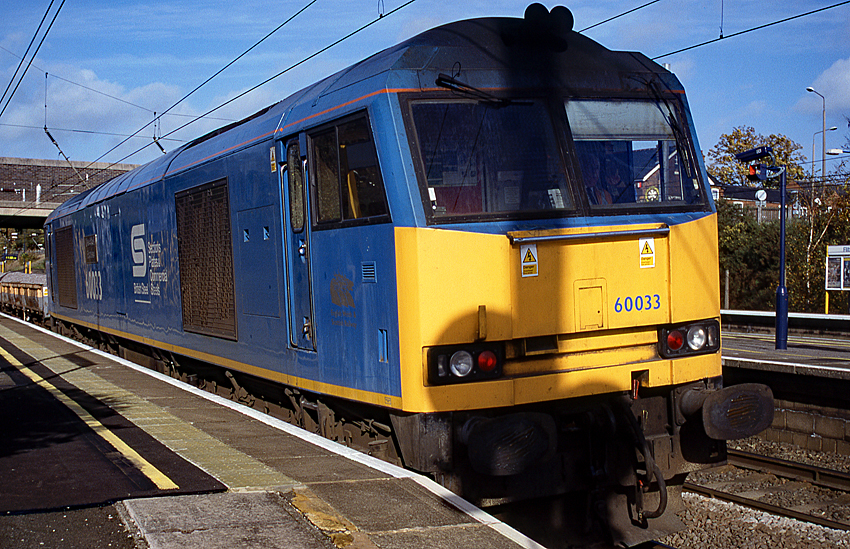
60 033 Tees Steel Express in British Steel blue at Flitwick in 1999

After coming into EWS's ownership, the Class 60 locomotives were repainted in the red and yellow EWS livery as and when repainting was necessary. Many others carried vinyl stickers on their sides over the former BR sector liveries, demonstrating EWS's ownership. A few locos received new names including 60 033: Tees Steel Express, painted in British Steel blue, and 60 081, repainted in a mock Great Western Railway green livery and renamed Isambard Kingdom Brunel in 2000.

In 2007/08, two locomotives received special liveries: 60 074 received a 'powder blue' livery and was named Teenage Spirit at the National Railway Museum in York as part of a charity event for the Teenage Cancer Trust. 60 040 was repainted in a red livery and named The Territorial Army Centenary as part of the celebration of that event. Both of these locos have since been repainted into standard DB Schenker livery.

In 2010 class 60 number 60 099 was repainted into a Tata Steel silver livery and logo at Toton TMD and unveiled at Tata's Scunthorpe plant on 27 September.

In January 2011 60 011 became the first member of the class to receive the standard DB Schenker livery, after a repaint at Toton TMD.

In late May 2014 60 087 emerged from Toton TMD in Colas livery. It was joined by 60 002, 021, 026, 047, 056, 076, 085, 095 and 096.

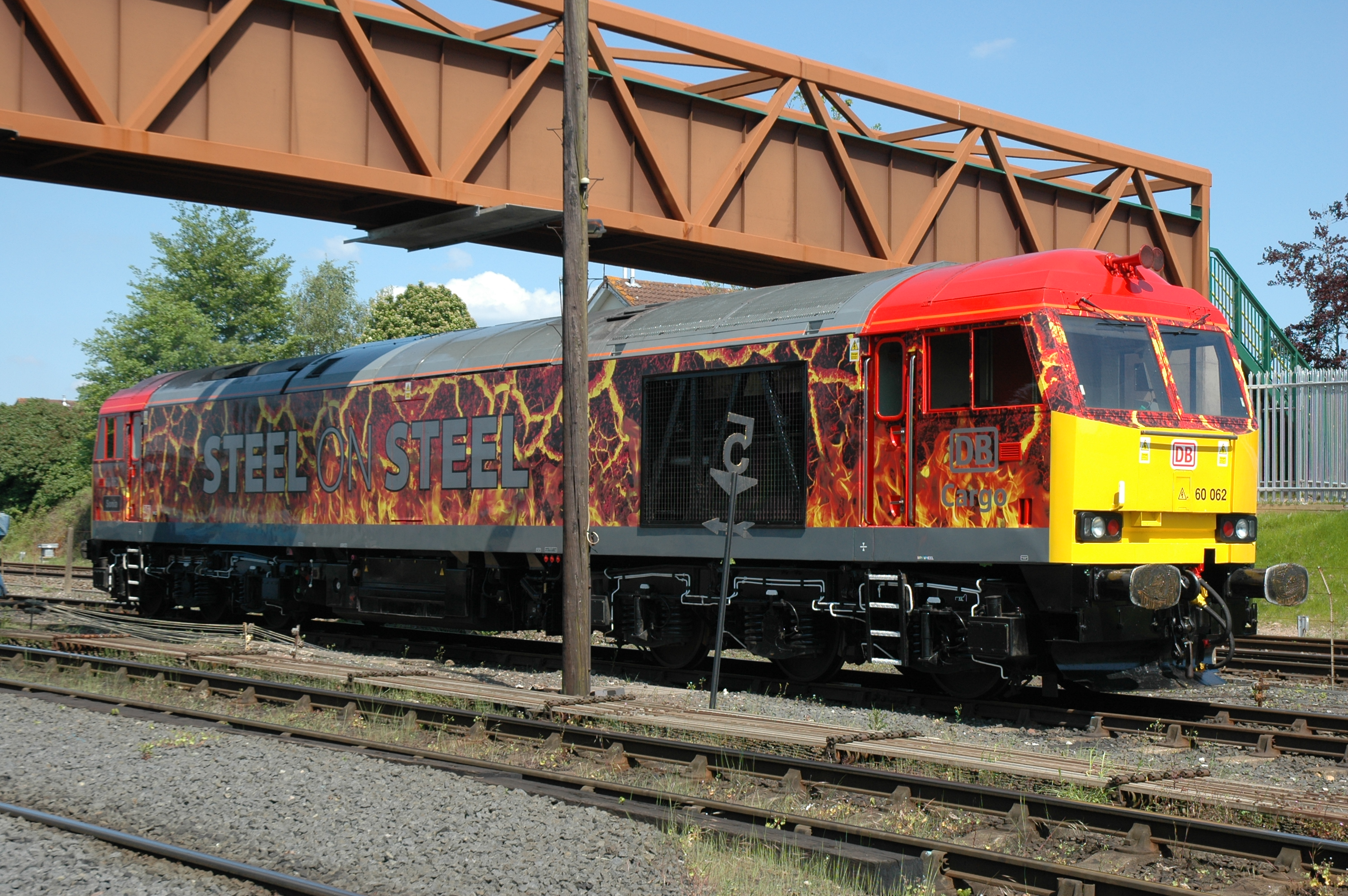
60 062 Sonia in 'STEEL ON STEEL' livery at Kidderminster in 2023

In 2019 DCR Cappagh acquired four former DB Cargo Class 60s, from store, which were overhauled and repainted by DB Cargo at Toton TMD. 60 046 and 60 055 were repainted in the DC Rail Freight corporate grey livery. 60 046 regained its original name, William Wilberforce, whilst 60 055 regained its original name, Thomas Barnardo. 60 028 was turned out in a blue livery, with large CAPPAGH logo. On 18 February 2020 the final locomotive of the quartet, 60 029, emerged from a repaint, at Toton TMD, in DC Rail Freight grey and carrying its original name, Ben Nevis.

In mid-June 2022 60 062 was repainted into a new 'STEEL ON STEEL' livery, highlighting DB Cargo UK's role in transporting metal around the country. This repaint was part of the company's 'Freight Belongs on Rail' campaign. On 25 August 2022 the locomotive was named Sonia after a member of DB Cargo's office staff.

== Scrapping ==
On 20 January 2020 work began scrapping locomotive 60 006 at Toton depot, the first Class 60 to be dismantled. In 2026 two further locomotives, 60057 and 60075, were broken up at Colwick Depot.

== Fleet summary ==
Owner	Number	Operational	Non-operational	Notes
ESH Rail Services (Land Recovery)	66	60062/063/074	60001/003/005/007/010-012/015/017/019/020/023-025/027/030-037/039/040-045/048-054; 60058/059/065-069/071-073/077-079/082-084/086/088/089/091-094/097/100/500	60500 was originally 60016 and was renumbered to celebrate Rail magazine's 500th edition.
DCRail	17	600022/028/029/046/055/099	60008/009/013/038/060/061/064/070/080/090/098	
GB Railfreight	13	60026/047/056/076/085/095/096	60002/004/014/018/021/087	
Preserved	1		60081	60050 and 60086 were initially purchased for preservation. before being sold back to ESH as spares donors.
Totals	97	16	81	
Scrapped	3		60006/057/075	

=== Fleet list ===
Key:	In service	Stored	Scrapped	Preserved

Number	Original name	Subsequent names	Operator	Status	Notes
60 001	Steadfast	The Railway Observer	ESH Rail Services	Stored	Named on 29 June 1989 by Raymond Wynn, winner of a British Rail competition to select a name for the new freight locomotive.
60 002	Capability Brown	1) High Peak; 2) Tempest; 3) Graham Farish	GB Railfreight	Serviceable	Renamed in 2021 by GB Railfreight after the railway modelling company.
60 003	Christopher Wren	Freight Transport Association	ESH Rail Services	Stored	
60 004	Lochnagar		GB Railfreight	Stored	
60 005	Skiddaw	BP Gas Avonmouth	ESH Rail Services	Stored	
60 006	Great Gable	Scunthorpe Ironmaster		Scrapped	Scrapped at DBC Toton depot in January 2020.
60 007	Robert Adam	The Spirit of Tom Kendall	ESH Rail Services	Stored	
60 008	Moel Fammau	Sir William McAlpine	DCRail	Stored	
60 009	Carnedd Dafydd		DCRail	Stored	
60 010	Pumlumon/Plynlimon		ESH Rail Services	Stored	
60 011	Cader Idris		DB Cargo	Stored	
60 012	Glyder Fawr		Land Recovery	Stored	
60 013	Robert Boyle		DCRail	Stored	
60 014	Alexander Fleming		GB Railfreight	Stored	
60 015	Bow Fell		ESH Rail Services	Stored	
60 016	Langdale Pikes	Rail Magazine	ESH Rail Services	Stored	Renumbered 60 500, in November 2004, to commemorate 500th issue of Rail Magazine
60 017	Arenig Fawr	Shotton Works Centenary Year 1996	ESH Rail Services	Stored	
60 018	Moel Siabod		GB Railfreight	Stored	
60 019	Wild Boar Fell	1) Port of Grimsby & Immingham; 2) Pathfinder Tours; 30 Years of Railtouring 1973-2003	ESH Rail Services	Stored	
60 020	Great Whernside	1) Pride of Colnbrook; 2) The Willows	ESH Rail Services	Stored	
60 021	Pen-y-Ghent	1) Star of the East; 2) Bustler	GB Railfreight	Serviceable	Original name restored by GB Railfreight, in Class 44 style, as of 21 May 2019.
60 022	Ingleborough		DCRail	Operational	Returned to service in September 2026 with the original "Ingleborough" name restored and in Midland Railway livery.
60 023	The Cheviot		ESH Rail Services	Stored	
60 024	Elizabeth Fry	Clitheroe Castle	ESH Rail Services	Stored	
60 025	Joseph Lister	Caledonian Paper	ESH Rail Services	Stored	
60 026	William Caxton	1) Jupiter; 2) Helvellyn	GB Railfreight	Operational	Renamed Helvellyn in 2024 by GB Railfreight, reusing the name from stored 60037.
60 027	Joseph Banks		ESH Rail Services	Stored	
60 028	John Flamsteed		DCRail	Operational	
60 029	Ben Nevis	Clitheroe Castle	DCRail	Operational	Original name restored, upon refurbishment for DC Rail.
60 030	Cir Mhor		ESH Rail Services	Stored	
60 031	Ben Lui	ABP Connect	ESH Rail Services	Stored	
60 032	William Booth		Land Recovery	Stored	
60 033	Anthony Ashley Cooper	Tees Steel Express	ESH Rail Services	Stored	
60 034	Carnedd Llewelyn		ESH Rail Services	Stored	
60 035	Florence Nightingale		ESH Rail Services	Stored	
60 036	Sgurr na Ciche	Gefco	Land Recovery	Stored	
60 037	Helvellyn	Aberthaw/Aberddawan	Land Recovery	Stored	
60 038	Bidean nam Bian	AvestaPolarit	DCRail	Stored	
60 039	Glastonbury Tor	Dove Holes	ESH Rail Services	Stored	
60 040	Brecon Beacons	The Territorial Army Centenary	ESH Rail Services	Stored	
60 041	High Willhays		ESH Rail Services	Stored	
60 042	Dunkery Beacon	The Hundred of Hoo	ESH Rail Services	Stored	
60 043	Yes Tor		ESH Rail Services	Stored	
60 044	Ailsa Craig	Dowlow	ESH Rail Services	Stored	
60 045	Josephine Butler	The Permanent Way Institution	ESH Rail Services	Stored	
60 046	William Wilberforce		DCRail	Operational	Original name restored, upon refurbishment for DC Rail.
60 047	Robert Owen	Scafell Pike	GB Railfreight	Operational	Renamed in 2021 by GB Railfreight, reusing the name from stored 60049.
60 048	Saddleback	Eastern	Land Recovery	Stored	
60 049	Scafell		ESH Rail Services	Stored	
60 050	Roseberry Topping		ESH Rail Services	Stored	
60 051	Mary Somerville		ESH Rail Services	Stored	
60 052	Goat Fell	Glofa Twr The last deep mine in Wales Tower Colliery	Land Recovery	Stored	
60 053	John Reith	Nordic Terminal	ESH Rail Services	Stored	
60 054	Charles Babbage		ESH Rail Services	Stored	
60 055	Thomas Barnardo		DCRail	Operational	Original name restored upon refurbishment for DC Rail.
60 056	William Beveridge		GB Railfreight	Operational	
60 057	Adam Smith			Scrapped	Scrapped at Boden Rail, Colwick depot in June 2026
60 058	John Howard		ESH Rail Services	Stored	
60 059	Samuel Plimsoll	Swinden Dalesman	ESH Rail Services	Stored	
60 060	James Watt		DCRail	Stored	
60 061	Alexander Graham Bell		DCRail	Stored	
60 062	Samuel Johnson	1) Stainless Pioneer; 2) Sonia; 3) Olivia Grace	ESH Rail Services	Operational	
60 063	James Murray	Robert Leech	ESH Rail Services	Operational	Named after a family member of ESH Rail Services management in May 2026
60 064	Back Tor		DCRail	Stored	
60 065	Kinder Low	Spirit of Jaguar	ESH Rail Services	Stored	
60 066	John Logie Baird		ESH Rail Services	Stored	
60 067	James Clerk-Maxwell		ESH Rail Services	Stored	
60 068	Charles Darwin		Land Recovery	Stored	
60 069	Humphry Davy	Slioch	ESH Rail Services	Stored	
60 070	John Loudon McAdam		DCRail	Stored	
60 071	Dorothy Garrod	Ribblehead Viaduct	ESH Rail Services	Stored	
60 072	Cairn Toul		ESH Rail Services	Stored	
60 073	Cairn Gorm		ESH Rail Services	Stored	
60 074	Braeriach	1) Teenage Spirit; 2) Daniel Murray	ESH Rail Services	Operational	
60 075	Liathach			Scrapped	Scrapped at Boden Rail, Colwick depot in June 2026
60 076	Suilven	Dunbar	GB Railfreight	Operational	
60 077	Canisp		Land Recovery	Stored	
60 078	Stac Pollaidh		Land Recovery	Stored	
60 079	Foinaven		ESH Rail Services	Stored	
60 080	Kinder Scout	1) Stanley Common; EWS Rail Safety Competition Winners 2003; 2) Bispham Drive Junior School, EWS Rail Safety Competition Winners 2004	DCRail	Stored	
60 081	Bleaklow Hill	Isambard Kingdom Brunel		Preserved	Static display only, currently at One:One Collection, Margate.
60 082	Mam Tor		ESH Rail Services	Stored	
60 083	Mountsorrel		ESH Rail Services	Stored	
60 084	Cross Fell		Land Recovery	Stored	
60 085	Axe Edge	1) Mini – Pride of Oxford; 2) Snowdon	GB Railfreight	Operational	Renamed in 2023 by GB Railfreight.
60 086	Schiehallion		ESH Rail Services	Stored	
60 087	Slioch	1) Barry Needham; 2) CLIC Sargent; 3) Ingleborough	GB Railfreight	Stored	Renamed Ingleborough in 2024 by GB Railfreight, reusing the name from stored 60022. After 60087 was stored in 2025 following a major failure, the name was later returned to 60022.
60 088	Buachaille Etive Mor		ESH Rail Services	Stored	
60 089	Arcuil	The Railway Horse	Land Recovery	Stored	
60 090	Quinag		DCRail	Stored	
60 091	An Teallach	Barry Needham	ESH Rail Services	Stored	
60 092	Reginald Munns		ESH Rail Services	Stored	Originally named after the liaison officer between British Rail, the National Coal Board and the Central Electricity Generating Board who was one of the architects of the UK merry-go-round coal train system.
60 093	Jack Stirk	Adrian Harrington 1955-2003; Royal Navy / Burges Salmon	Land Recovery	Stored	Originally named in honour of British Rail's National Coal Manager between 1969 and 1982.
60 094	Tryfan	Rugby Flyer	ESH Rail Services	Stored	
60 095	Crib Goch	Whernside	GB Railfreight	Operational	Renamed in 2024 by GB Railfreight, reusing the name from stored 60020.
60 096	Ben Macdui	1) Impetus; 2) Skiddaw	GB Railfreight	Operational	Renamed in 2024 by GB Railfreight, reusing the name from stored 60005.
60 097	Pillar	Port of Grimsby and Immingham	ESH Rail Services	Stored	
60 098	Charles Francis Brush		DCRail	Stored	
60 099	Ben More Assynt		DCRail	Operational	
60 100	Boar of Badenoch	1) Pride of Acton; 2) Midland Railway Butterley	ESH Rail Services	Stored	Originally named after Scottish mountain An Torc, also known as the Boar of Badenoch. It is a peak which lies between Loch Ericht and the Pass of Drumochter, and is 739m (2,424 feet) in height.

== Preservation ==
Presently one member of the class has been preserved. Two others (60050 and 60086) were previously bought for preservation but were never worked upon and were eventually sold back to a mainline company as spares donors.

Number	Name	Livery	Status	Location	Notes
60081	Bleaklow Hill; Isambard Kingdom Brunel	N/A	Static Display	One:One Collection, Margate	Purchased by Locomotive Services Limited and arrived in Margate in 2024.

== Models ==
The locomotives have been reproduced in scale model form by Heljan in O gauge, and Lima and Hornby in OO scale.

In 2007, a British N gauge Class 60 model of 60078 in Mainline blue was introduced by Graham Farish. From 2013, Graham Farish produced models of 60029 Ben Nevis in two-tone grey Railfreight Metal Sector livery and 60011 in DB Schenker red.

Accurascale UK announced a range of Class 60 models in OO gauge in June 2024.
