= Llangennech derailment =

2020 freight train derailment in Wales

Coordinates: 51°41′57.4″N 4°04′06.1″W

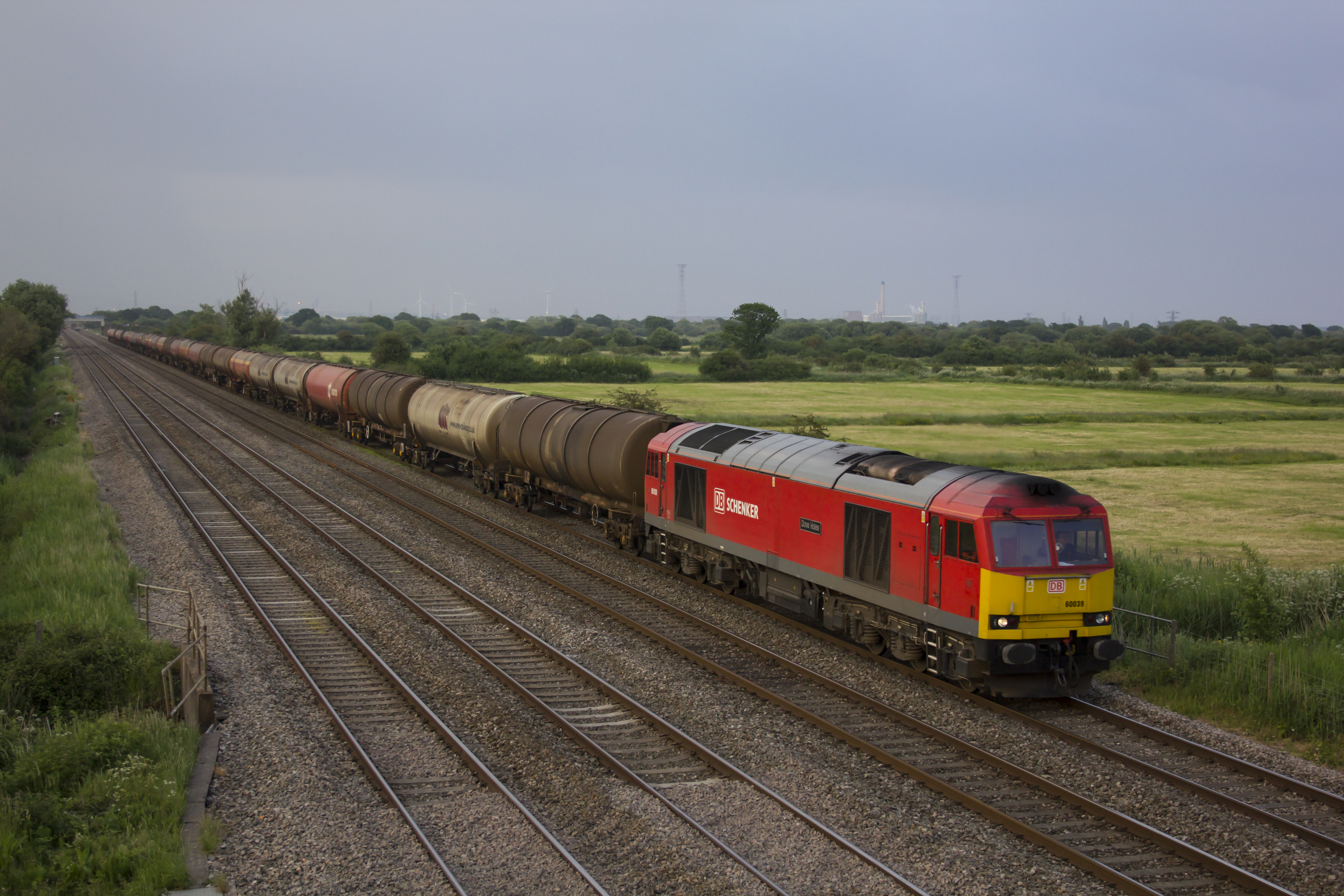
- A train of tank wagons, behind a Class 60 locomotive, similar to that involved in the accident

Details
- Date: 26 August 2020; ~23:15 BST (22:15 UTC)
- Location: Llangennech, Carmarthenshire
- Country: United Kingdom
- Line: Swansea District Line
- Operator: DB Cargo
- Service: 6A11 21:52 Robeston to Theale
- Incident type: Derailment and fire
- Cause: Inadequate maintenance, leading to defective brakes on a wagon causing an axle seizure which led to a derailment due to track deformation under the train

Statistics
- Trains: 1
- Crew: 2
- Injured: 0
- Damage: 2 wagons damaged beyond repair, 250 metres (270 yd) track destroyed. Severe contamination of local area by oil.

On 26 August 2020 a freight train carrying diesel fuel and gas oil in tank wagons derailed at Morlais Junction, Llangennech, Carmarthenshire, Wales. Some of the derailed wagons caught fire, leading to an evacuation of people living nearby. There was widespread contamination from the spilled fuel. The clean-up operation was described by Natural Resources Wales as the most challenging since the Sea Empress oil spill in 1996. The accident was caused by defective brakes on a wagon causing an axle to seize, which in turn caused deformation of the track under the train as it travelled over a set of points. The Heart of Wales Line was closed for seven months as a result of the derailment.

== Accident ==
At about 23:15 BST (22:15 UTC), the 6A11 21:52 Robeston Sidings (Milford Haven) – Theale freight train derailed and caught fire at Morlais Junction, near Llangennech, Carmarthenshire. The train, operated by DB Cargo, comprised a Class 60 locomotive 60062 Stainless Pioneer and 25 tank wagons, each carrying up to 75 tonnes of diesel and gas oil. The third to twelfth wagons derailed, spilling 446,000 litres (98,000 imp gal) of fuel. The train was travelling at 48 kilometres per hour (30 mph) at the time of the derailment. There were no injuries reported amongst the two train crew. Following the accident, the locomotive and first two wagons stopped 180 metres (200 yd) from the burning wreckage. The locomotive was uncoupled from the wagons and moved to safety. Class 66 locomotive 66004 moved the wagons at the tail of the train away from the scene of the fire. A large number of emergency services and local authority personnel attended the scene. The British Transport Police, Dyfed-Powys Police, Carmarthenshire County Council, Mid and West Wales Fire and Rescue Service and Natural Resources Wales (NRW) all sent personnel. Fourteen fire appliances, a foam tender and a high pressure pump attended the fire, which was expected to burn for several days. By the evening of 27 August, six of the appliances had been withdrawn. The fire was extinguished at 08:30 on 28 August, having burnt for 33 hours. Control of the site was then handed over to the British Transport Police (BTP) and Network Rail (NR). Once BTP had established that the derailment was accidental, they passed control to the Office of Rail and Road (ORR).

== Aftermath ==
Dyfed-Powys Police set up an 800-metre (870 yd) radius exclusion zone, and about 300 local residents were evacuated from their homes. They were later allowed to return. The railway between Llanelli and Shrewsbury was closed. Buses were laid on to replace passenger trains between those stations, with the journey taking more than 6 hours. The A4138 road was closed, to be reopened by midday, and the B4297 was also closed. Local road disruption was expected to last for several days. This was the first major accident involving a tanker train fire in the United Kingdom since the Summit Tunnel fire on 20 December 1984, (Note: A fire occurred in one wagon of a tanker train that was derailed at Stewarton, Ayrshire on 27 January 2009 when a bridge collapsed under the train.) and the second derailment and fire in two weeks, following the Stonehaven derailment. The derailment destroyed track over a distance of 250 metres (270 yd) and also destroyed signalling cables in the area. On 6 September, it was claimed by Member of the Senedd and Deputy Transport Minister Lee Waters that the railway could be closed until December 2020. NR subsequently said the line would be closed until January 2021. It eventually reopened on 8 March 2021, seven months after the derailment.

NRW said a significant volume of diesel had been spilled. (Note: 330,000 litres (73,000 imp gal) spilled, 116,000 litres (26,000 imp gal) burnt.) Some of this flowed into the River Loughor, whose estuary is a designated SSSI and a wildlife conservation area. Work to contain the spill commenced on 28 August. Local cockle and other shellfish picking was suspended following the spill on advice from the Food Standards Agency. By 1 September, diesel had spread as far as Crofty, Glamorgan, about 4 1/2 miles (7 km) from the site of the derailment. Shellfish picking resumed in mid-October. Work to remove 12,000 cubic metres (16,000 cu yd) of contaminated soil from the site began in December.

The undamaged wagons were removed from the site on 31 August. Those at the front of the train were taken to Margam, whilst those at the rear were taken to Llandeilo Junction. Work to recover the derailed wagons started on 1 September, with the aim of recovering two wagons a day. Two of the derailed wagons were cut up in situ. The rest were lifted by a rail crane and removed by road, with the last wagon being removed on 8 September.

By 1 February 2021, the clean-up operation was nearing completion, with the work scheduled to be complete by the end of February. NRW said that the recovery operation was the most challenging event since the Sea Empress oil spill in 1996. Monitoring of the area affected by the oil spill would continue until 2026.

The line was reopened on 8 March 2021 after a total of 37,500 hours of repair and environmental protection work. Some 30,000 tonnes of soil had been removed.

== Investigations ==
The BTP, ORR and Rail Accident Investigation Branch (RAIB) opened investigations into the accident. The BTP ruled out criminal activity as a cause of the derailment.

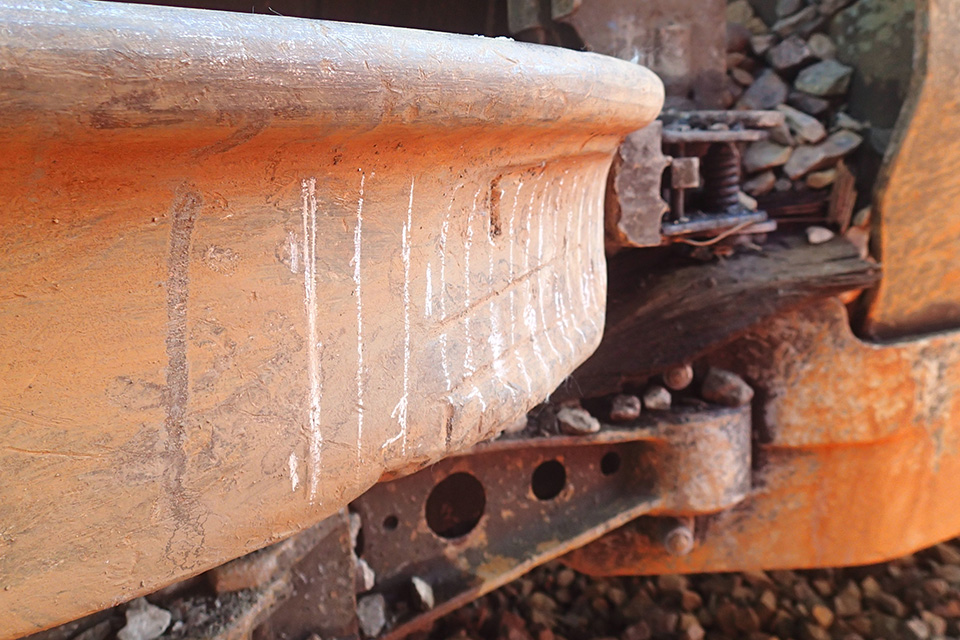
The damaged wheel, with flat spot and false flange. Note that the wagon is on its side.

On 21 September 2020, the RAIB released an update about their investigation. It had been found that at some point on the journey, the brakes on the third wagon had become applied. The leading axle of the front bogie had seized, causing a 230 mm (9-inch) flat spot to develop on one of the wheels, along with a false flange. As the train traversed a set of points, the wheel distorted the track under the train, causing the derailment. The wagon had run for more than 12 miles (19 km) in this condition. The brakes had become applied due to a fault with the mounting of a relay valve on the wagon. On 30 October 2017, the brakes on a wagon of a tanker train from Robeston had seized causing a severe flat spot, before the axle became free again. Track between Carmarthen Junction and the Llangyfelach Tunnel, a distance of 72.2 kilometres (44.9 mi), was severely damaged. On 5 November, the RAIB released an Urgent Safety Advice notice relating to the maintenance of wagons used primarily for the carriage of dangerous goods. On 6 March 2021, an oil train caused severe damage to track between Pencoed and Llanharan following the development of wheel flats on a tank wagon, caused by the brake system falling apart whilst the train was on its journey from Robeston to Theale. The RAIB, in its notification of an investigation, drew attention to similarities with the 2017 incident and the derailment at Llangennech.

The RAIB published its final report on 13 January 2022. Nine recommendations were made.

== Litigation ==
In February 2023, Natural Resources Wales announced that they considered it would be reckless to pursue a criminal prosecution over the accident. They concluded that there was insufficient evidence for a successful conviction against any company or individual.

In August 2026, Network Rail sued DB Cargo UK and Touax Rail for £5million over the derailment. It claimed that DB Cargo UK had "breached a contractural duty to ensure that reasonable care was taken" maintaining the wagon which caused the derailment. Touax Rail are alleged to have "not maintained the wagon with reasonable care.

In November, it was reported that DB Cargo UK was suing Network Rail for £30million, claiming that the signaller at Morlais Junction Signal Box should have seen that the wheels on the wagon were locked and should have stopped the train. Touax Rail have denied any responsibility over the failure to maintain the wagon, stating that they never carried out any maintenance on the wagon's brakes.
