= Bobby Trendy =

American actor

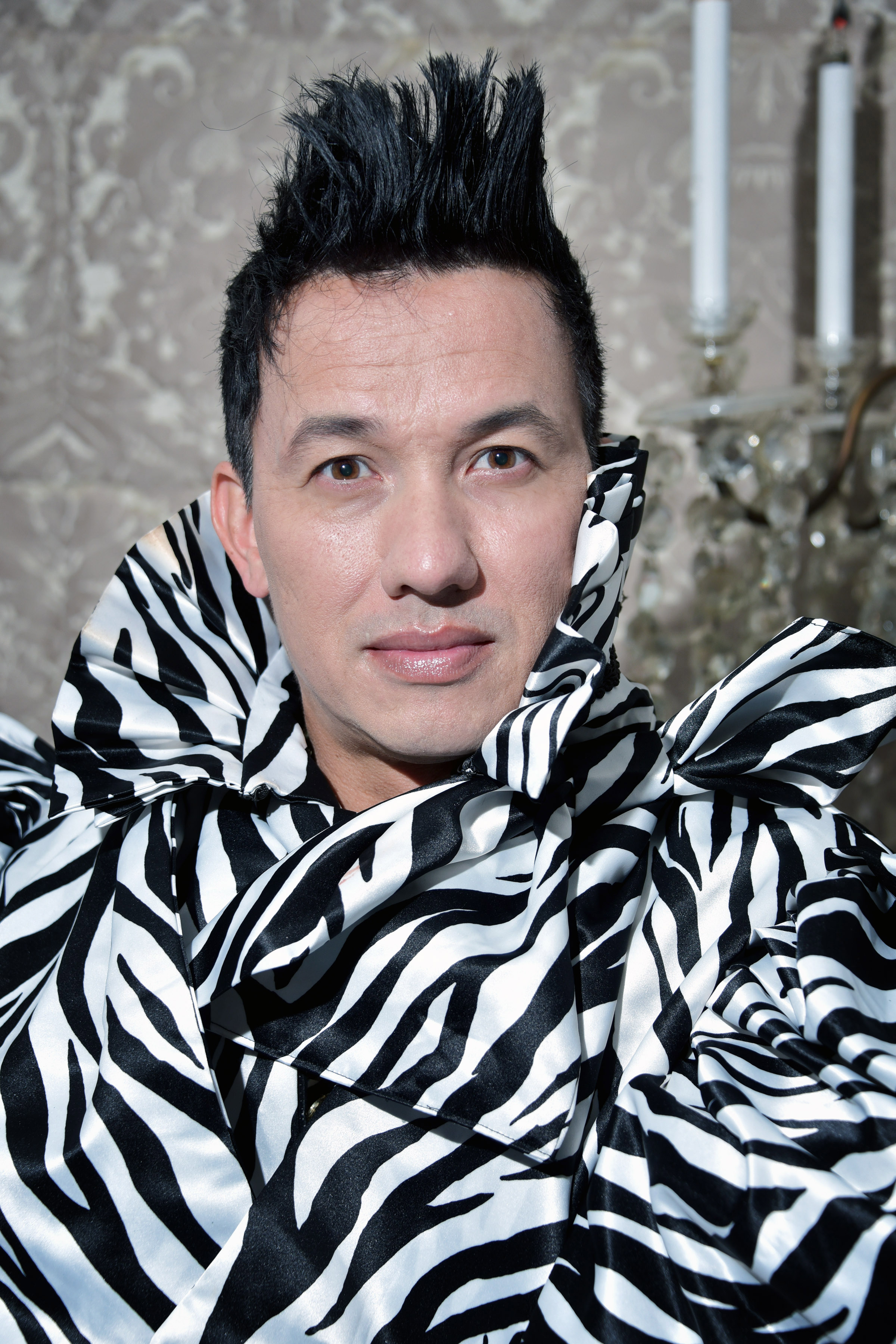
- Bobby Trendy, West Hollywood, California on February 4, 2017
- Born: Raymond John Muro; Valencia, California, USA
- Occupations: Interior decorator, designer, television personality
- Known for: Links with Anna Nicole Smith, television appearances
- Website: www.bobbytrendy.com

Raymond John Muro also known as Bobby Trendy, is an American interior decorator, fashion designer and television personality best known for his appearance on The Anna Nicole Show.

Muro grew up in Northern California. At the age of 17 he moved to Beverly Hills, California using his own savings.

Anna Nicole Smith hired Trendy to decorate her new house on her television show The Anna Nicole Show. About how he got on the show, Trendy has said "listen, and listen good. They saw me on E!'s Celebrity Homes, and they knew that I was deep".
