= Frédéric Prinz von Anhalt =

German-American businessman

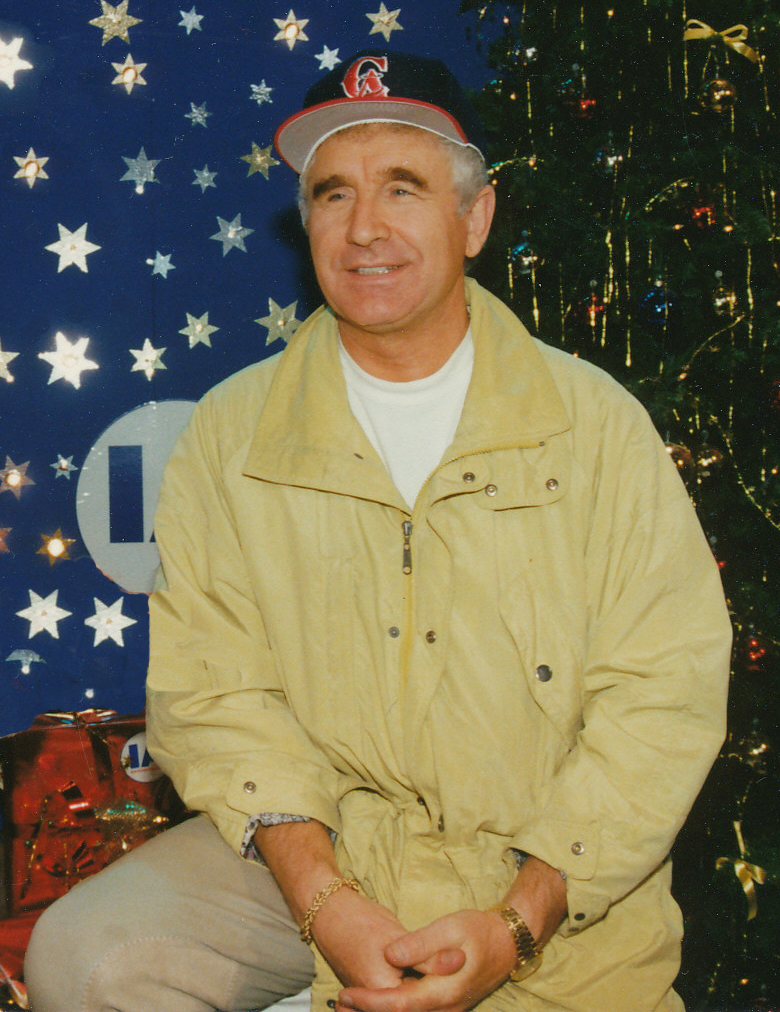
- Prinz von Anhalt in 2009
- Born: Hans Robert Lichtenberg; 18 June 1943 (age 83); Wallhausen, Rhineland-Palatinate, Germany
- Citizenship: Germany; United States (naturalized)
- Known for: Marriage to Zsa Zsa Gabor
- Spouse: Zsa Zsa Gabor (m. 1986; died 2016)
- Website: www.princefrederic.com

Frédéric Prinz von Anhalt (né Hans Robert Lichtenberg; born 18 June 1943) is a German-American businessman and socialite. In 1980, he was adopted by the elderly Princess Marie-Auguste of Anhalt in exchange for financial support and subsequently changed his surname to Prinz von Anhalt lit. 'Prince of Anhalt', a title he has since leveraged in his business career. After Marie-Auguste's death, he moved to the United States, where he became Zsa Zsa Gabor's ninth and final husband until her death in 2016.

== Early life ==
Hans Robert Lichtenberg was born on 18 June 1943 in Wallhausen, near Bad Kreuznach in Rhineland-Palatinate. He was one of five children. His father was a Kriminalrat (Detective Chief Superintendent) in the Kriminalpolizei whom von Anhalt would later accuse of physical abuse, and his mother was a bookkeeper. He was trained as a baker and worked in the central market halls. He later operated several men's sauna clubs and a disco in the Württemberg and Dortmund regions and, after settling in Munich, became a loan shark.

=== Adoption and professed title ===
In 1980, Lichtenberg was adopted by Princess Marie-Auguste of Anhalt (1898–1983), then in her 80s. Upon adoption, Lichtenberg's name became "Frédéric Prinz von Anhalt" – "Prinz" (Prince) is part of the legal surname in Germany and not a princely title anymore according to modern German law. Despite being unrecognized by the House of Ascania, von Anhalt styles himself "Prince Frédéric of Anhalt, Duke of Saxony and Westphalia, Count of Ascania".

Anhalt previously claimed to have been a childhood friend of Marie Auguste's only biological child, Karl Franz (1916–1975), and that the grieving mother adopted him out of kindness. However, the adoption was in fact arranged by Hans Hermann Weyer, a prolific orchestrator of honorary consulships, sham degrees, and adult adoptions by former German nobles. In exchange for his adoption by Marie-Auguste, von Anhalt paid her DM 2,000 per month until the Princess's death. Weyer subsequently criticized von Anhalt, who never paid the bulk of his DM 200,000 adoption fee, as his "most appalling" client. Von Anhalt characterized his adoption and subsequent assumption of titles as a "door opener" and "business decision" in a 2018 interview.

Following his assumption of the "Prinz von Anhalt" name, von Anhalt entered several sham marriages to sell the title and also began to sell knighthoods. He also briefly was Prince Regent of the Principality of Sealand. The Hollywood Reporter found that von Anhalt had incurred several criminal convictions during his time in Germany, including for assault, burglary, fraud and theft.

== Career ==
=== Marriage to Gabor ===
In 1983, von Anhalt moved to the U.S., becoming a socialite and living a flamboyant lifestyle. He soon met Hungarian actress Zsa Zsa Gabor at a party thrown by Sidney Sheldon in Holmby Hills. On August 14, 1986, he married Gabor despite the opposition of her mother, Jolie. It was his seventh marriage, some his previous marriages being related to title sales. Gabor claimed that, shortly after their marriage, she came close to arranging Anhalt's adoption by an anonymous member of the British Royal Family.

The marriage was Gabor's ninth, but legally her eighth, as her marriage to Felipe de Alba had been annulled due to its bigamy. It also became her longest marriage. "We didn't marry for love", Anhalt said. "It was a friendship, but when you're with someone over a certain time you fall in love." In interviews after Gabor's death, he characterized the pair's marriage as tumultuous but affectionate, and claimed to have acted as Gabor's primary caregiver following her serious 2002 injury in a car accident. Von Anhalt claimed that the amputation of her leg due to gangrene forced the couple to sell their Bel Air mansion, although Gabor and von Anhalt were allowed to remain as life tenants. It came into the possession of its new owner upon Gabor's death, and was resold in 2018 for $20.8 million.

Upon the death of Gabor in December 2016 von Anhalt inherited all of her assets as the sole remaining heir. Von Anhalt claims that Gabor's late daughter, Francesca Hilton, stole Gabor's will while she was hospitalized, but due to Hilton's death in January 2015, it did not interfere with Anhalt's acquisition of her assets. Gabor allegedly never heard of her daughter's death, due to von Anhalt's worry that the news might result in Gabor's death. Von Anhalt sold nearly 1,000 items from Gabor's estate at auction in 2018.

=== Candidacies for public office ===
On February 16, 2010, Anhalt declared he would seek the governorship of California, running as an independent candidate against Meg Whitman and Jerry Brown in the 2010 election. He withdrew his candidacy on August 2, 2010, citing problems with his wife's health. On September 18, 2017, Anhalt again declared himself a candidate in the 2018 gubernatorial election. However, his name was not included in the list of certified candidates for the election.

In October 2011, via a large billboard on Sunset Boulevard, Anhalt stated his intention to run for Mayor of Los Angeles in the 2013 election, but then did not pursue this campaign.

Anhalt expressed support for Donald Trump in several German interviews and television appearances.

== Personal life ==
=== Clash with Gabor's daughter ===
Zsa Zsa Gabor's daughter, the late Francesca Hilton, alleged von Anhalt compromised her mother's dignity, security and health for attention and profit. Hilton claimed von Anhalt prohibited Gabor from having visitors, including her own daughter. Hilton mocked von Anhalt's alleged homosexuality in her comedy act.

Hilton claimed he fostered a circus atmosphere surrounding her mother's health, had plans to have her body preserved with plastic for public display, and claims Gabor wanted to mother a child at the age of 94, which she described as "just weird." Hilton remained worried about her mother's health, home and fortune.

At the time of her death, relations between Hilton and von Anhalt had been sour for nearly a decade. In 2005, he sued Hilton, alleging she had attempted to defraud her mother. However, Gabor refused to sign the papers in her husband's suit against her daughter so the court dismissed it. Hilton became embroiled in a battle regarding Gabor's conservatorship and will in 2015 with von Anhalt, but died soon after its settling in Anhalt's favor.

=== Adopted children ===
Anhalt has several adopted children who paid him for the von Anhalt surname. These include Oliver, a businessman who died at 45 after a motorcycle crash on the same day of Gabor's death, Marcus, a prominent brothel and nightclub owner, and Kevin, a former Regionalliga soccer player and entrepreneur.

=== Anna Nicole Smith affair ===
On February 9, 2007, Anhalt stated that he had a decade-long affair with Anna Nicole Smith and could potentially be the father of her infant girl Dannielynn Birkhead, but in March, it was determined that Smith's former boyfriend Larry Birkhead was the biological father.

=== Alleged robbery ===
On July 25, 2007, while sitting in his Rolls-Royce Phantom in Southern California, Anhalt was allegedly approached by three women whom he later described as attractive. He said they asked him to pose for pictures with them, at which point one of the women robbed him at gunpoint, taking his car keys, jewelry, wallet, driver's license, and all his clothes. According to von Anhalt, his assailants bound him and placed him in handcuffs, yet he managed to call the authorities on a cellphone. Los Angeles police found him stark naked approximately one hour later. No handcuffs were found at the scene. The culprits, apparently, drove away in a Chrysler convertible.
