= Sea Empress oil spill =

1996 oil spill off the coast of Wales

Coordinates: 51.6796°N 5.1777°W

The Sea Empress oil spill occurred at the entrance to the Milford Haven Waterway in Pembrokeshire, Wales on 15 February 1996. The Sea Empress was en route to the Texaco oil refinery near Pembroke when she became grounded on mid-channel rocks at St. Ann's Head. Over the course of a week, she spilt 72,000 tons of crude oil and 480 tons of heavy fuel oil into the sea. The spill occurred within the Pembrokeshire Coast National Park – one of Europe's most important and sensitive wildlife and marine conservation areas. It was Britain's third largest oil spill and the twelfth largest in the world at the time.

The location where the Sea Empress ran aground

Sailing against the outgoing tide and in calm conditions, at 20:07 GMT the ship was pushed off course by the current and became grounded after hitting rocks in the middle of the channel. The collision punctured her starboard hull causing oil to pour out into the sea. Tugs from Milford Haven Port Authority were sent to the scene and attempted to pull the vessel free and re-float her. Efforts were also made to offload any remaining oil from the ship but weather conditions caused delays, resulting in more spilled oil. During the initial rescue attempts, she detached several times from the tugs and grounded repeatedly – each time slicing open new sections of her hull and releasing more oil. A full scale emergency plan was activated by the authorities. News of the grounding was first reported at 21:18 on the BBC's Nine O'Clock News – just over an hour after she ran aground.

Over the next few days, efforts to pull the vessel from the rocks continued. Tugboats were drafted in from the ports of Dublin, Liverpool and Plymouth to assist with the salvage operation.

== Environmental impact ==
The Sea Empress disaster occurred in the Pembrokeshire Coast National Park, Britain's only coastal national park. The tanker ran aground very close to the islands of Skomer and Skokholm – both National Nature Reserves (NNR), Sites of Special Scientific Interest (SSSI), and Special Protection Areas (SPA). These two islands are important breeding sites for seabirds, and the designations of NNR, SSSI, and SPA provide additional legal protections. Skomer and Skokholm are home to Manx shearwaters, Atlantic puffins, guillemots, razorbills, great cormorants, and European storm petrels.

Birds at sea were hit hard during the early weeks of the spill, resulting in thousands of deaths among many different species. The common scoter was one of the seabirds most affected, with large population decline directly after the incident. Long-term monitoring of the common scoter population has shown that the population has almost completely recovered, and that the species is returning to the previously contaminated area.

The Pembrokeshire grey seal population was not greatly affected and impacts to subtidal wildlife were limited. However, much damage was caused to shorelines affected by bulk oil. Shore seaweeds and invertebrates were killed in large quantities. Mass strandings of cockles and other shellfish occurred on sandy beaches. Rock pool fish were also affected. However, a range of tough shore species were seen to survive exposure to bulk oil and lingering residues.

A rescue centre for oiled birds was set up in Milford Haven. According to the Countryside Council for Wales (CCW), over 70% of released guillemots died within 14 days. Just 3% survived two months and only 1% survived a year.

The Pembrokeshire coast is home to common porpoises and bottlenose dolphins. The effects of the oil and chemical pollution on these species remains unknown. Significant numbers of both species were recorded in the waters off the Skomer Marine Nature Reserve during the spring and summer of 1996.

The main containment and dispersement of the oil slick at sea was completed within six weeks. However, the removal of oil on shore took over a year until the late spring of 1997. Small amounts of oil were still found beneath the sand on sheltered beaches and in rock pools in 1999 – three years after the spill.

The effects of the spill were not as bad as initially predicted. This was due in part to the time of year when the spill occurred. In February, many migratory animals had not yet arrived back in Pembrokeshire for breeding. Along with stormy weather which helped break-up and naturally disperse the oil, the effect on wildlife would have been much worse if the spill had occurred just a month later. The spill would undoubtedly have been catastrophic for both the environment and local economy if it had occurred during the summer months.

Much of the Pembrokeshire coastline recovered relatively quickly. By 2001, the affected marine wildlife population levels had more-or-less returned to normal.

== Economic impact ==
Directly after the event, local fishermen implemented a voluntary ban on fishing to prevent potential contamination of food sources. Once the area affected could be determined, an official ban was put into place under the 1985 Food and Environment Protection Act (FEPA). Over 2,100 square kilometers (810 square miles) were impacted, resulting in a negative impact on the local fishing industry. These restrictions remained in place for several months and were lifted in stages as species in the affected areas no longer showed impacts from the oil. The last remaining restriction was lifted 19 months after the incident, allowing mussels and oysters to be commercially fished again. Many local fishermen received financial compensation for the loss of income due to the ban.

Many of the beaches affected were tourist locations, and the potential economic impact of them being closed over the Easter holiday was a large concern. Beaches near Tenby, Saundersfoot, and Skrinkle Haven were all prioritized for the land-based clean-up efforts.

== Clean-up ==
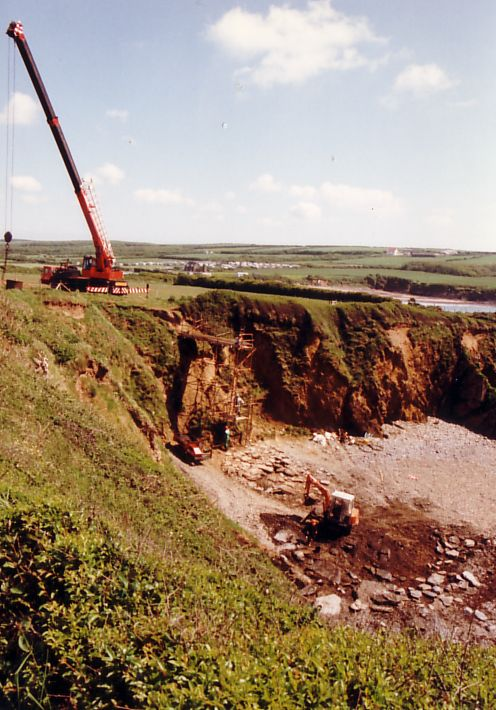
Cleanup in difficult places still ongoing over a year later near Angle Bay

A large clean-up operation began as soon as the Sea Empress started spilling oil. Initially, efforts were made to clean the oil up mechanically, however poor weather conditions resulted in only 3% of the oil being recovered. Over 445 tons of chemical dispersants were sprayed onto the oil using planes between 18 and 22 February. The chemical dispersants reduced the amount of oil that reached the beaches, preventing further impacts to both people and the environment. People also worked to apply chemical dispersants to the affected beaches of Pembrokeshire, spraying over 12 tons of dispersant. In the immediate days and weeks that followed, over a thousand people worked around the clock to rescue oiled birds and remove oil from beaches using suction tankers, pressure washers and oil-absorbing scrubbers. The main clean-up operation lasted several weeks and continued on a reduced scale for over a year.

Many techniques were used to clean the beaches depending on the location's accessibility and the potential impacts to wildlife.

== Aftermath ==
Almost three years after the spill, Milford Haven Port Authority (MHPA) was fined under the Water Resources Act 1991 for £4 million after pleading guilty to causing pollution. The port also paid £1.3 million for a safety review and £1.7 million in legal fees.

The cost of the clean-up operation was estimated to be £60m. When the effects to the economy and environment are taken into account, the final cost is estimated to have been almost twice that, at £116 million.

In 2002, the International Oil Pollution Compensation Fund, often referred to as FUND92 or FUND, filed a £34 million claim against MHPA. FUND92 said that they had paid £26.7 million to those who were affected and that Skuld, the insurance company responsible for the Sea Empress, had paid £7.4 million. MHPA planned to fight these claims in court.

The port pilot, who was responsible for guiding the ship into the channel, at the time was John Pearn. Pearn was charged with incompetence, however he was not prosecuted as the judge saw that Pearn was too inexperienced. The judge found that Pearn was not given the simulator training needed to perform the specific tidal manoeuvre required at the time. Pearn was demoted and was barred from piloting any supertankers over 90,000 tonnes (the Sea Empress was around 147,000 tonnes).

Following the spill, the Sea Empress was repaired and renamed five times. In 2004, she was sold and moved to Chittagong as a floating production, storage and offloading unit (FPSO). In September 2009, she was acquired by Singapore-based Oriental Ocean Shipping Holding Pte. Ltd., renamed Welwind, and converted from an oil tanker to a bulk carrier. In 2012, she was renamed for a fifth time to Wind 3, before being scrapped in June 2012, in Chittagong.

Since the event, there have been many studies assessing the environmental impacts from the oil spill, both in the short-term and long-term. There have been no long-term effects that can be traced back to the incident.

== See also ==
- Braer – Another single-hulled oil tanker which ran aground off the Shetland Islands in 1993 spilling 56,000 tonnes of oil
- Torrey Canyon – Ran aground off the coast of Cornwall in 1969. It was en route to Milford Haven
- Haven – (Formerly known as Amoco Milford Haven) a supertanker which sank off the coast of Genoa, Italy in 1991
- Llangennech derailment - a train crash in 2020 which caused a major oil spill in south Wales
