= The Anna Nicole Show =

Television series

- First season DVD
- Also known as: The Anna Nicole Smith Show
- Genre: Reality
- Starring: Anna Nicole Smith; Daniel Smith; Howard K. Stern; Kim Walther
- Country of origin: United States
- Original language: English
- No. of seasons: 2
- No. of episodes: 26

Production
- Executive producer: Jeffrey Shore
- Producers: Darren Ewing; Kevin Hayes; Mark McDermott
- Running time: 22–24 minutes

Original release
- Network: E!
- Release: August 4, 2002 – October 7, 2004

The Anna Nicole Show is an American reality sitcom starring former model and Playboy Playmate Anna Nicole Smith. The series debuted on August 4, 2002 on E! and ran for two seasons and four one-hour specials. The first season was the most watched show on the network.

== Synopsis ==
The show follows the exploits of Anna Nicole Smith and her entourage; much of the focus of the series was on the fact that Smith had gained weight after falling out of the public eye, no longer received regular modeling or acting work, and, at the time of the series' debut, was in a precarious financial state after lavish spending sprees and the battle against her stepson for her deceased husband's fortune. Story arcs included Smith's alleged period of unwilling celibacy (which Smith referred to as "the dry spell"); her struggle to cure her miniature poodle's habit of attempting intercourse with inanimate objects; her love-hate relationship with her toothless, redneck cousin; and her "fashion feud" with interior decorator Bobby Trendy.

Although termed a reality show, many, if not all, of the episodes began with situations contrived by the producers (i.e., Smith goes to a dating service; Smith participates in a game show based on The Bachelorette); the show was a "reality show," however, to the degree that Smith's and the other individuals' interactions and reactions to the events occurring around them were unscripted.

== Additional cast ==
In addition to Smith, the show also featured:

- Kim Walther "Kimmy/Kimmie" – Smith's personal assistant. She claimed to be Smith's biggest fan and admirer, insisting that she saw the "inner beauty" of Smith, which led her to getting a large tattoo of Smith on her shoulder and upper arm. Kimmie's ambiguous sexual orientation and the possibility of a lesbian relationship with Smith surfaced in several episodes.
- Howard K. Stern – Smith's attorney, frequently portrayed as a cold, calculating mind who serves as Smith's right-hand-man; he frequently assumes the role of stooge. Stern's antagonistic relationship with interior decorator Bobby Trendy was a recurring plot line throughout most of the series.
- Daniel Smith – Smith's teenage son. Though listed in the show's opening credits, his appearances were infrequent, and he often appeared to be somewhat camera shy. In his rare appearances, he was portrayed as something of a foil to his mother's raunchy behavior.
- Sugar Pie – Smith's miniature poodle. The dog's tendency to attempt to have intercourse with various inanimate objects was a running gag on the show. In the first season of the show Smith attempted to cure Sugar Pie of her habits by hiring a pet psychic.
- Bobby Trendy – A flamboyantly gay interior decorator, the quality of whose work and timeliness, or lack thereof, displeased Smith, resulting in an elongated feud which served as the show's major ongoing plot line; he was somewhat the show's primary antagonist. He was prone to making self-congratulatory bon mots about his own taste in fashion and clothing accessories and frequently went out of the way in the middle of conversation to list the brand names of the articles of clothing he was wearing. Had something of a catchphrase in uttering the word "luxurious" in reference to himself or activities in which he participated.
- Michelle "Shelly" Cloud – Anna Nicole Smith's cousin; "Cousin Shelly" is portrayed as Smith's opposite. She never left the small town in which she grew up and is now an impoverished housewife with no teeth. Shelly frequently arrives on Smith's doorstep without notice to request financial assistance or otherwise attempt to exploit their relationship for financial gain, though she insists it's because they were close as children and that she misses her cousin. Next to Bobby Trendy, she is the show's second most notable "antagonist." In the series finale, Shelly reveals that she plans to force herself and her husband into Smith's life permanently by moving into her house with or without permission. In a way its implied that Anna doesn't care for her at times because she seems to be a reminder of what her life could have been like and what she could have turned into if she had never left Mexia, Texas.
- Benjy Bronk – Benjy from The Howard Stern Show went on two dates with Smith after her appearance on the Stern show. According to Smith, they "...had a drink, and the next thing I knew, my head was in Benjy's lap and I loved it..."
