= MV Sea Empress =

Single-hull Suezmax oil tanker

Coordinates: 51°40′42″N 5°09′46″W

History

- Name: Sea Empress
- Owner: Oriental Ocean Shipping
- Builder: Spain
- Launched: 6 June 1992
- Acquired: 2010
- Out of service: 2012
- Identification: IMO number: 8906999; Callsign: 3ETO5
- Fate: Scrapped 2012

General characteristics
- Tonnage: 147,273 DWT
- Length: 274.3 m (899 ft 11 in)
- Beam: 43.2 m (141 ft 9 in)
- Draft: 17.02 m (55 ft 10 in)
- Installed power: 13,475 kW (18,070 hp)
- Propulsion: direct-drive diesel, single propeller
- Capacity: 164,156 m^{3} (1,003,040 imp bbl)

MV Sea Empress was a single-hull Suezmax oil tanker that ran aground at the entrance to the Milford Haven harbour on the southwest coast of Wales in February 1996. The ensuing oil spill, Britain's third largest oil spillage and the 12th largest in the world at the time, devastated a considerable area of local coastline and killed many birds, and continued to affect the Pembrokeshire coast for years afterwards.

== Grounding ==
The location where the Sea Empress ran aground.

On the evening of 15 February 1996 the Sea Empress was entering the mouth of the Cleddau Estuary on her way into Milford Haven in Pembrokeshire to discharge its oil cargo at the Texaco oil refinery. Sailing against the outgoing tide, at 20:07 UTC the ship was pushed off its course by the current and hit rocks in the middle of the channel, which punctured her starboard hull causing oil to pour out into the bay.

== Short-term effects ==
Over the first few days of the disaster, an estimated 73,000 tonnes out of the ship's 130,000-tonne cargo of North Sea crude oil was spilt, most of which spread along either the shoreline of Milford Haven waterway or the coastline to the south. This caused an enormous amount of environmental and aesthetic damage to the coastline and its marine life in an area which lies within the protection of the Pembrokeshire Coast National Park.

=== Birds ===
The most visible effect of the spill was seen in the large number of birds covered in oil that were shown on television and in newspapers. Amongst the birds affected were guillemots, razorbills and the worst affected bird, the common scoter duck. 83% of the birds affected were common scoter birds, and it is estimated that 5,000 of the 15,000 population in the area were killed. The RSPB set up a temporary bird hospital in Milford Haven to try to treat as many birds as possible. This centre is now a storage area but in the aftermath of the Sea Empress disaster it became a hive of activity where many birds were showered and cleaned as best as possible. Unfortunately, the life expectancy of a cleaned Guillemot or Razorbill that was oiled once it was let back into the sea was a very short 9 days. Members of the public also helped rescue the birds. It was later revealed in a study by the British Trust for Ornithology that the average survival time for a rescued oiled Auk (Razorbill or Guillemot) was seven days.

=== Seals ===
Although the Sea Empress ran aground near to a breeding area for the grey seal, the time of year meant that only a small number of seals were in the area. Although some seals showed signs of oil on their coats, there is no record of a seal dying as a result of the spill.

=== Beaches ===
Two hundred and one kilometres (125 mi) of coastline were covered in crude oil. The total cost of the cleanup operation was approximately £60 million. It took almost five years for the coastline to be fully cleaned up and restored by the Pembrokeshire Council, Texaco workers and subcontractors, and wildlife conservationists. There was much speculation in the media at the time over the inherent lack of safety of single-hull tankers, particularly in view of the MV Braer disaster in Scotland just three years earlier; Braer also being a single-hull vessel.

== Fate of the Sea Empress ==
The Sea Empress was recovered and subsequently renamed Sea Spirit and later Front Spirit. It was sold as Ocean Opal to Chinese buyers, who used it as a floating storage and offloading unit (FSO) from 2004. Around 2009, she was converted in Shanghai into a bulk carrier and reflagged to Panama as Welwind. In 2012, she was renamed for a fifth time and became Wind 3.

While being brought to Chittagong for dismantling in the Shitakunda ship breaking yard, as Wind 3, the vessel developed a crack in one side of its engine room. This resulted from a collision with a sunken ship, Hang Ro Bong, on the afternoon of 3 June 2012, when it was attempting to anchor at the B (Bravo) anchorage of the port. She was scrapped on 2 June 2012 at Chittagong.

== See also ==
- List of oil spills
- Supertanker
- Amoco Cadiz
- Exxon Valdez
- Torrey Canyon
