= MV Avenue Star =

Cargo ship

History
- Name: Avenue Star
- Port of registry: Liberia
- Launched: 1 August 2007
- Completed: 2008
- Identification: IMO number: 9476068; MMSI number: 256908000; Callsign: 9HFI9

General characteristics
- Tonnage: 17,200 dwt 10,965 gt 6,106 nt
- Length: 152m
- Beam: 21m
- Draft: 8.48m
- Depth: 12.45m
- Ice class: B
- Propulsion: PIELSTICK Type 8PC2-5L
- Speed: 12.5 knots (23.2 km/h)

MV Avenue Star is Liberian-flagged a 17,200 dwt bulk cargo ship built in 2008.

According to a statement from the United States Attorney for the Middle District of Florida, Yavuz Mogultay was serving on board Avenue Star as the ship's engineer when he used bypass hoses to shortcut the vessel's pollution prevention equipment and discharge oil waste from the engine room. The United States Coast Guard discovered the oil in the ship's ballast water tank upon inspecting the vessel on October 21, 2009, at the Port of Tampa. On July 23, 2010, Mogultay pleaded guilty to the charges of failing to record the discharges properly. He was later sentenced to 60 months probation.
