= MV Altavia =

History
- Name: Altavia
- Owner: Herm. Dauelsberg
- Port of registry: Monrovia, Liberia
- Builder: Gdynia Shipyard
- Launched: 24 September 1994
- Identification: IMO number: 9064322; Callsign: ELRR4
- Fate: Scrapped 2014

General characteristics
- Tonnage: 30743 dwt
- Length: 188m
- Beam: 30m
- Installed power: Diesel
- Propulsion: Sulzer 6RTA72U
- Speed: 21.5kts

MV Altavia was a Liberian-flagged cargo ship launched on 24 September 1994 and completed on 4 April 1995. On July 20, 2010, Altavia was turned away from the Port of Hagåtña, Guam by United States Customs officials after thousands of spiders erupted from her cargo during unloading. In November 2014, she was sold for scrap.
