= Battle of Preveza =

1538 battle of the Third Ottoman–Venetian War

Coordinates: 38°57′33″N 20°45′01″E

- Part of the Third Ottoman–Venetian War
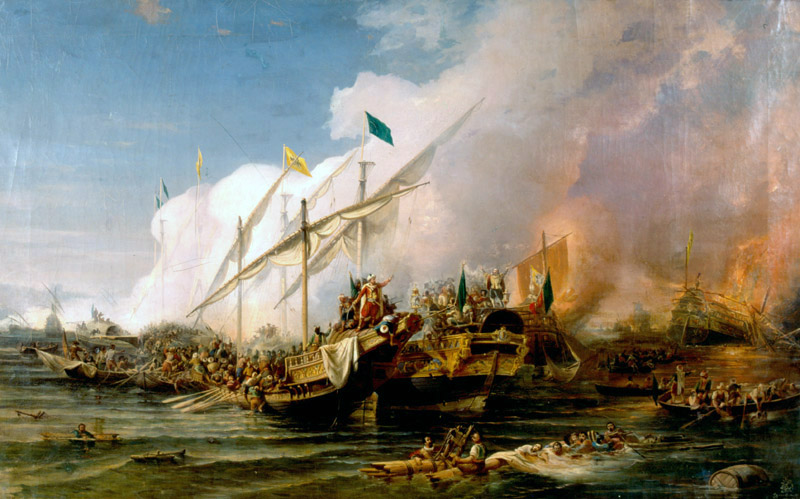
- Battle of Preveza, Ohannes Umed Behzad
Date	28 September 1538
Location	Near Preveza, Ionian Sea
Result	Ottoman victory (Note: The sixteenth century saw only three such large battles: Preveza in 1538, Djerba in 1560 and Lepanto in 1571. These battles were spectacular..[...].Nevertheless, these battles were not really decisive; a galley fleet can be built in a few months and the logistical limitations of galleys prohibit the strategic exploitation of victory.)

Belligerents
Ottoman Empire	Holy League: Venice; Papal States; Genoa; Spanish Empire; Mantua; Malta

Commanders and leaders
Hayreddin Pasha; Sinan Reis; Dragut Reis; Seydi Ali Reis	Andrea Doria; (Republic of Venice) Vincenzo Cappello; Marco Grimani; Ferrante Gonzaga; Paolo Simeone

Strength
120–150 galleys, galliots and gustas 366 cannons 3,000 janissaries and 8,000 soldiers	130–170 galleys 50–140 carracks and galleons Possibly 250–300 other ships 2,500–2,594 cannon 60,000 soldiers

Casualties and losses
Several ships damaged 400 killed 800 wounded	Two galleys and five carracks sunk or captured (Spanish and Italian sources); 128 ships sunk or captured (Turkish sources); 13 ships sunk and 36 captured (English sources); 3,000 prisoners (English sources)

The Battle of Preveza (also known as Prevesa) was a naval engagement that occurred on 28 September 1538 near Preveza in the Ionian Sea in northwest Greece, in the same area as the Battle of Actium in 31 BC. The battle was between an Ottoman fleet, led by Kapudan Pasha Hayreddin Barbarossa, and a Holy League of Venetian and Hispano-Imperial composition, led by Genoese admiral Andrea Doria. It was part of both the Ottoman–Habsburg wars and the Ottoman Venetian War of 1537-1547. It ended with the Holy League defeated by the Ottomans despite its enormous advantage in numbers and tonnage.

The course of the battle is uncertain; according to historian Roger Merriman, "accounts of it are so contradictory that it is almost impossible to reach the truth". Traditional historiography, aligned with Venetian sources, holds the Holy Fleet was undone by an inexplicable lack of initiative by Doria, who might have had secret incentives to throw the battle. The Genoese were long time rivals to the Venetians, while Barbarossa was in midst of negotiations with Doria for a possible change of sides. Conversely, Imperial sources blame the defeat on the Venetians, who would have refused to follow Doria's orders in a decisive moment out of the same enmity.

The battle was amongst the three largest in the Mediterranean in the sixteenth century, alongside the Battle of Djerba and the Battle of Lepanto. In contrast, it was relatively uneventful, although it still resulted in a rupture between the Christian navies. This marked the beginning of the Ottoman Empire as the first naval power in the Mediterranean, which lasted thirty years until their loss in Lepanto in 1571.

== Background ==
In 1537, commanding a large Ottoman fleet, Hayreddin Barbarossa captured several Aegean and Ionian islands belonging to the Republic of Venice, namely Syros, Aegina, Ios, Paros, Tinos, Karpathos, Kasos, and Naxos, thus annexing the Duchy of Naxos. He unsuccessfully besieged Corfu, which belonged to the Republic of Venice, and ravaged the Spanish-held Calabrian coast.

In February 1538, Pope Paul III assembled a Holy League, comprising the Papal States, Habsburg Spain, the Republic of Genoa, the Republic of Venice, and the Knights of Malta, to confront Barbarossa's fleet. Andrea Doria, the Genoese admiral in service to Emperor Charles V, was in command the armada. The Papal fleet under Patriarch Marco Grimani and the Venetian fleet under Vincenzo Cappello arrived first. Doria joined them with the Spanish-Genoese fleet on 22 September 1538. Spirits were high after Charles had evicted Barbarossa from his base in Tunis during his campaign of 1535.

Before Doria arrived, Grimani attempted to land troops near the Fortress of Preveza but suffered significant casualties in an encounter with Ottoman forces under Murat Reis, causing a retreat to Corfu, where the Holy League assembled its fleet. Barbarossa was at Kos in the Aegean Sea at that time, but soon arrived at Preveza with the rest of the Ottoman fleet after capturing Kefalonia. Sinan Reis, an Ottoman lieutenant, suggested landing troops at Actium on the Gulf of Arta, near Preveza. Barbarossa initially opposed this idea, though it later proved important in securing Ottoman victory.

== Opposing forces ==
According to Cesáreo Fernández Duro, the Christian fleet was composed of 133 galleys, 72 carracks and galleons, and as many as 250 minor vessels. They carried 50,000 men on board, 16,000 of them being marine infantry, and 2,500 cannons. For his part, Roberto Damiani gives a total of 146 galleys, 50 galleons and 200 other warships, with 60,000 men. A Turkish source gives 168 galleys, 140 galleons and 300 carracks and troop carriers, with 60,000 men and over 2500 cannons.

Other sources give way smaller numbers. Roger Crowley gives 139 galleys and 70 sailing ships. According to chronicler Martín García Cereceda, who participated in the battle, the fleet featured 141 galleys and 62 sailing ships. Hospitaller chronicler Giacomo Bosio, drawing from fellow witness Giovan Foxana, lists 135 galleys and 62 ships.

It was composed by several national blocks:

- A Genoese and Spanish fleet under Andrea Doria. Duro gives 49 galleys, while Damiani and Stanley Lane-Poole give 30. Turkish sources note 52 galleys. Cereceda recorded 51 galleys and 50 sailing ships.
- A Venetian fleet under Vincenzo Cappello. Duro credits it with 55 galleys, while Damiani and Lane-Poole give 80. Turkish sources list 70. Cereceda recorded 60 galleys and 12 sailing ships.
- A Papal squad under Marco Grimani. Duro gives 27 galleys, with Cereceda giving 30, and Damiani, Lane-Poole and Turkish sources giving 36.
- A Hospitaller squad under Paolo Simeone, with four galleys. Turkish sources give 10.

The Ottoman fleet is listed by Duro as featuring 85 galleys, 30 galiots, 25 fustas and an unknown number of brigantines, giving a total of 150 ships, also carrying Turkish troops. Damiani gives 130 galleys and 80 minor ships. Lane-Pool gives 122 vessels. Crowley gives 90 galleys and 50 galiots. The Turkish sources gives 122 galleys and frigates, with 8,000 troopers on board, among them 3,000 Janissaries.

Although the Christian fleet enjoyed a vast advantage in numbers and means, its inner factionalism would prove a comparable drawback, while in turn the Ottoman fleet featured an unified command. Paul III had acted as a mediator between the distinct factions, but in turn, Charles V was discontent with the Pope for his neutral stance during Charles' last war against King Francis I of France. Tension between the Christian commanders was also high, as the Venetians maintained a long time rivalry with the Genoese and Spanish, who were in command of the fleet. This hostility would prove to be disastrous.

== Previous movements ==
The night of September 20, Doria and Viceroy of Sicily Ferrante Gonzaga met with a Spanish emissary of Barbarossa in Parga. The Ottoman admiral had been in talks with Charles V for a possible entry into his service, and was now tempted again. However, the Imperial side refused his demands to be handed back the lordship of Tunis, while conversely, Barbarossa refused to set fire to all the Ottoman ships he could not take with him as the emperor wished. On September 23, after their fleet joined the Holy League in Corfu, talks were held again by agents sent to Barbarossa.

On September 25, after having located Barbarossa, Doria stationed his armada in front of the mouth of the gulf, where the two fleets observed each other in a stalemate. Barbarossa could not leave, as he would have been overwhelmed, and the surrounding land was under Ottoman control, so his armada could wait safely. Doria would have won in a direct battle, but he could not assault the gulf as its mouth acted as a bottleneck for his ships. Furthermore, he was unable to manoeuvre his sailing ships, whose artillery he relied on, as strong winds threatened to drive the ships onto the hostile coast if they approached further.

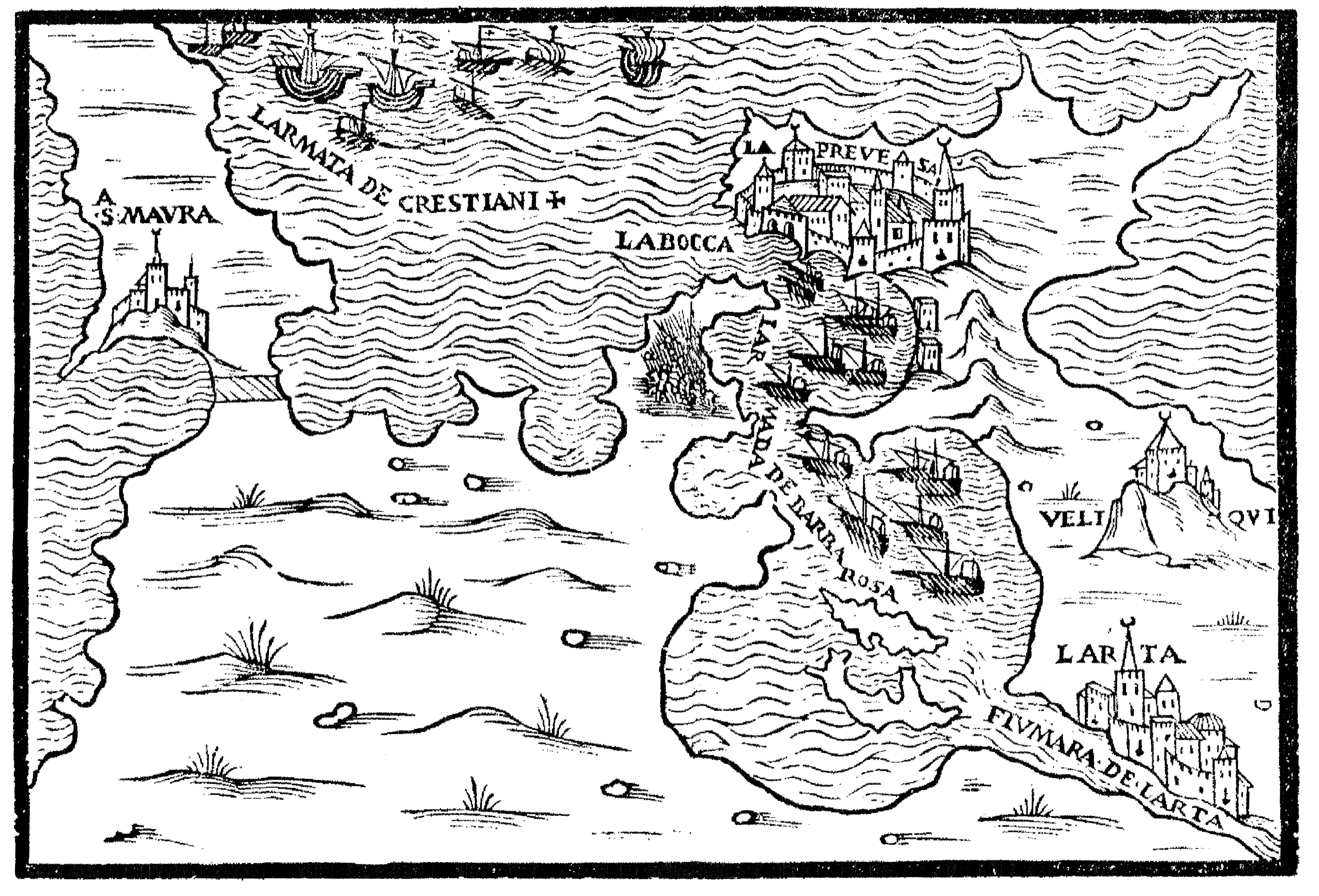
Gulf of Arta, showing the Christian fleet outside and the Ottoman fleet inside.

The Holy League were forced to disembark their landing forces and eliminate the Ottoman artillery before installing their own and turning the gulf against the Ottomans. A plan involving the Spanish Marine Infantry was considered and rejected due to Grimani's previous failure and because explorers could not find anywhere to safely disembark. Doria also feared that the approaching autumn weather would leave their land force disconnected from their armada. The Ottomans attempted to build additional fortifications but were prevented by the artillery fire from the coast. This was the only exchange that day as both sides did not want to risk making a mistake.

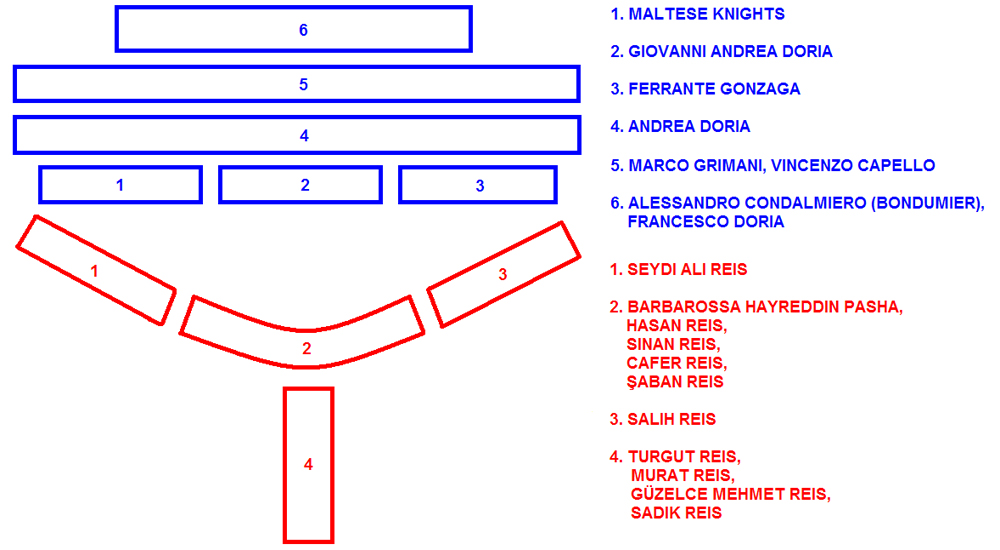
Deployment of the opposing fleets.

During the night of September 27, Doria ordered his fleet to sail 30 miles south towards Sessola, near Leucade, and raid Lepanto and nearby Turkish positions to force Barbarossa to come out. Barbarossa quickly ordered his fleet into a Y-shaped formation, with himself in the center, alongside Sinan Reis, Cafer Reis, Şaban Reis and his son Hasan Reis. Seydi Ali Reis commanded the left wing and Salih Reis commanded the right wing. Turgut Reis, accompanied by Murat Reis, Güzelce Mehmet Reis and Sadık Reis, commanded the rear wing with six large galliots.

== Battle ==
Accounts of the battle are highly divergent. Christian sources provide mutually incompatible accounts on the movements and intentions of Doria, Grimani and Cappello during the battle. Fernández Duro noted that Papal and Venetian sources, which became the mainstream version by their primacy and vigor, portray Doria as causing defeat through inaction, either deliberately or by incompetence, while Hispano-Imperial accounts blame Grimani and Cappello for refusing to follow Doria's battle plan in midst of the battle. Paolo Giovio and Paolo Paruta were amongst the Papal and Venetian sources hostile to Doria, while García Cereceda and imperial chronicler Jean de Vandenesse are amongst those favorable to him. For his part, Bosio sought to challenge the rest of the accounts with his own, drawing from the Hospitallers' own attestations.

=== Venetian-Papal account ===
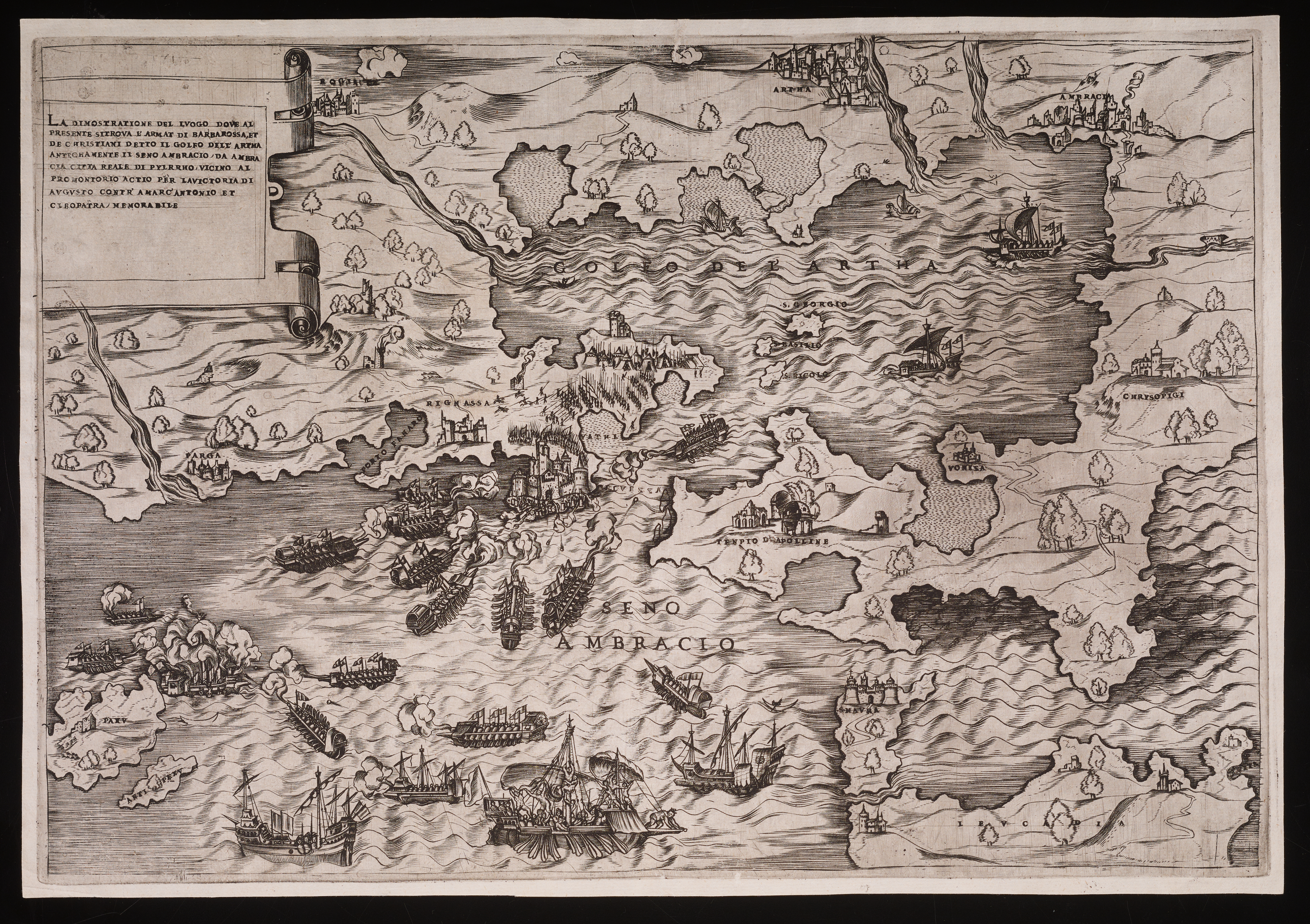
Map showing the positions of fleets in the battle.

Venetian accounts state that Doria believed Barbarossa was too close to the Ottoman-controlled shore, so he did not order an attack. Cappello and Grimani disagreed with Doria and pushed for an attack. After three hours of discussion, Doria relented, ordering the galleys to turn north, where they would reunite with sailing ships. Weather disrupted his strategy, as a lack of wind caused the sailing ships to lag behind, giving Barbarossa an opportunity to attack them with his more mobile galleys without leaving the Ottoman shore. The Christian captains called for immediate help to the ships, but Doria did not give the order.

Among the sailing ships, the huge Venetian flagship Candia or Galeone di Venezia, captained by Alessandro Condalmiero, was left stranded 4 miles off the coast and 10 miles off Sessola, and was surrounded by dozens of Ottoman galleys. Condalmiero initially fended them off with heavy artillery, but Barbarossa's ships managed to position themselves on the ship's blind spots and attack without danger of her broadsides. Condalmiero attempted to turn around to prevent this. The ship fought fiercely, waiting for galleys that did not arrive, ending up damaged, but not captured, even after Barbarossa's flagship joined the fray.

Meanwhile, Doria remained unwilling to attack, even with wind finally in his favor. He eventually headed with the Christian galleys towards Barbarossa, trying to trap the Ottomans between them and the sailing ships, but upon reaching the battle, he turned away, believing Barbarossa was still too close to the coast, and hoping to act as bait for Barbarossa to turn towards. Cappello and Grimani grew weary from tactical manoeuvring, so they pushed for Doria to fight, even boarding his flagship to argue with him. Doria still refused, unsuccessfully faking an attack twice before the night fell. He ordered all Christian vessels to escape.

=== Hispano-Imperial account ===
Imperial sources state that Doria ordered the fleet to be ready after seeing Barbarossa leaving Arta. He ordered to turn around the fleet, which had the Venetian and Papal galleys at the forefront, the sailing ships in the center, and the Spanish and Genoese galleys in the rear guard. Wind favoured the sailing ships, commanded by Franco Doria, which left the fleet behind and advanced en masse while firing their artillery, inflicting damage on the Ottoman galleys. However, the wind stopped and rendered the sailing ships immobile.

Doria had believed the ships would be enough to defeat the Ottoman fleet, so he changed his gameplan. He sent a messenger on a brigantine to call Grimani and Cappello, communicating his intent to attack with the galleys and asking if they complied, which they both confirmed. Grimani thought it was risky to frontally engage Barbarossa, but was willing to do so. Capello even offered his son as a hostage to demonstrate his compliance. Doria then signaled for the sailing ships to try to get between the Ottoman fleet and the coast, intending to cut them from their allied land, and eventually use the Christian galleys to envelop any Ottoman who attempted to do the same to the sailing ships.

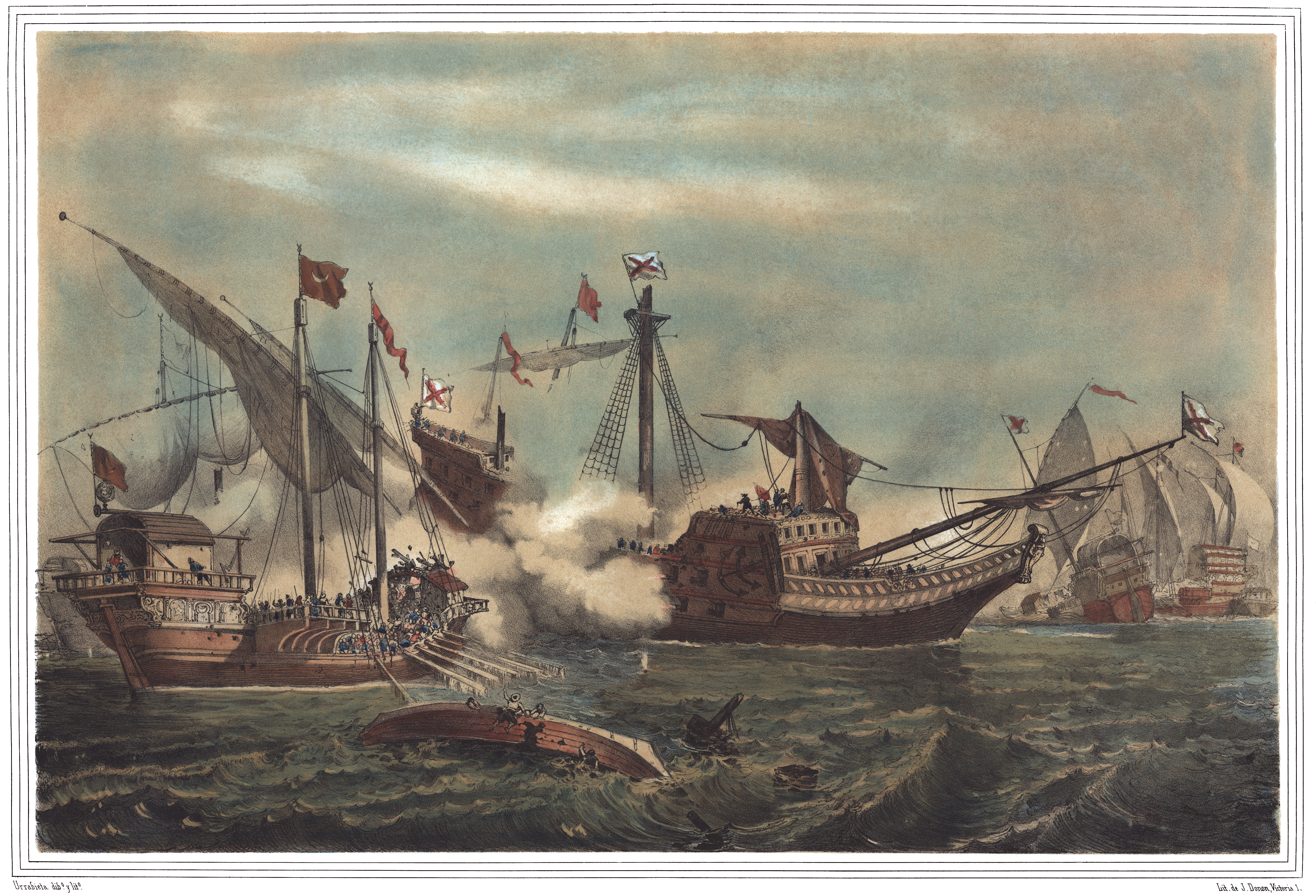
Machín de Munguía's vessel fighting in Preveza.

He ordered the Christian galleys to form, with the Spanish and Genoese galleys at the forefront, the Venetians in the center, and the Papal galleys in the rear guard. He also had some of his galleys form between the Venetian vessels, as he had previously deemed the latter unsuitable for battle, and had unsuccessfully tried to convince the Venetians to embark Spanish soldiers in their galleys. However, despite Doria ordering to attack thrice, the Venetian and Papal galleys did not move. In turn, the Venetian galleys started moving away from the battle.

Doria dispatched Ferrante Gonzaga in another brigantine to urge Cappello and Grimani to follow his strategy. The allied captains replied evasively, with Grimani claiming he lacked superior orders from the Republic of Venice to engage in direct combat. At the end, Doria was only followed by nine allied galleys. He sailed around the formation, calling the rest to regroup, but many became entangled in the attempt, which would have made them easy prey had the sailing ships not been between them and Barbarossa.

Meanwhile, Barbarossa had started attacking the sailing ships. The Spanish and Genoese sailing ships fought back through sheer firepower. Five of them, led by Francisco Sarmiento, defended successfully. Another galleon captained by Juan Villegas de Figueroa was eventually overwhelmed, forcing his marine infantry to fight in a last stand until the vessel sank. Another ship, captained by Machín de Munguía with his marine company, faced dozens of Turkish galleys, becoming dismasted and severely damaged, although ultimately escaping unboarded. The Venetian galleon never joined the battle due to being too far removed from the action. Doria had given up the battle, but he tried to make Barbarossa pursue him in order to get him away from the ships, advancing against him with his galleys before feinting and turning to open sea. However, Barbarossa did not take the bait.

=== Hospitaller account ===
According to Bosio, the Catholic fleet was hampered by having less galleys and no unified command in comparison to the Ottoman fleet, added to the fact that their galleys were not well equipped. Doria had attempted to embark Spanish soldiers in the Venetian and Papal galleys, with the double goal of strengthening them and preventing them from deserting him during the battle, but Capello refused, claiming not to have clearance from Venice for it. He also describes Barbarossa sending out small squads to skirmish with the Christian fleet before coming out of the gulf.

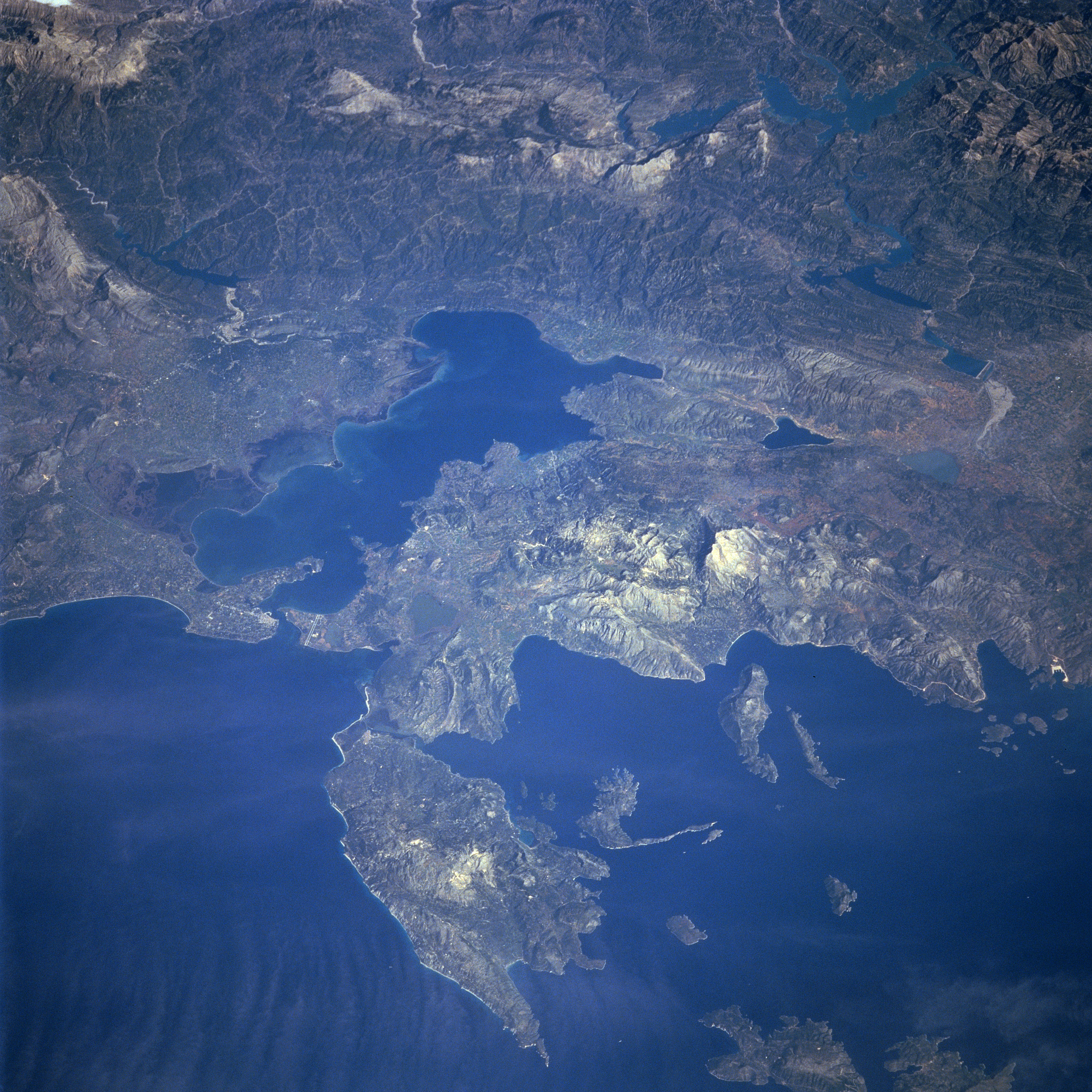
A satellite view of Lefkada and the Gulf of Arta.

Barbarossa formed in spread eagle, with a Tabach Reis at the left, Salah Reis at the right, Dragut on the front and himself in the center. For his part, Doria formed in a defensive rectangle, with the Hospitaller galleys at the front, his own galleys in the middle and the Venetians and Papals at the rear guard, with the sailing ships behind. Doria then ordered the Venetian galleon to spearhead an attack on the enemy right while he led another on the left. However, at that moment the wind changed direction, becalming his sailing ships. The Genoese aborted his plans, knowing his fleet would be overpowered without their galleons and carracks, but Capello and Grimani demanded to attack, to the extent of boarding Doria's galley to pressure him.

Doria hoped for another change of wind, but when this did not come, he changed his strategy, ordering all the galleys to come to the front and form a line. However, Capello and Grimani were not paying attention to his signals and simply plodded forward, almost colliding with the other lines and causing an enormous confusion. While Doria ordered for the galleys on the back to be towed forward, Barbarossa finally capitalized on his chance and fired with his artillery, inflicting damage on the Christian galleys and assailing several of their ships. Doria went around them, trying to act as a decoy and ordering the galleys to hold the fire until Barbarossa gave full battle, but this never happened.

Rain started falling, which Doria capitalized on to make his fleet escape the debacle, signaling for the fleet to head for Corfu before putting off his lanterns to confuse the enemy. The Venetian galleon and the Spanish carracks of Machín de Munguía, severely damaged by the battle but having succeeded to fight the Ottomans off, followed the fleet.

=== Results ===
Italian and Spanish sources state that the Christians had lost two galleys and five ships by the end of the day, while Turkish sources state that the Ottomans had sunk, destroyed or captured 128 ships, taking approximately 3,000 prisoners. English sources state that there were 13 destroyed ships, 36 captured and 3,000 prisoners. The Ottomans kept all of their ships, but 400 died and 800 were wounded. Venetian sources do mention one sunk galley.

== Aftermath ==
Paul III met the news of the defeat with sorrow, and even considered to joining personally the fleet along with reinforcements. Charles V expressed similar intentions. Sultan Suleiman the Magnificent celebrated highly the battle, ordering Barbarossa to pay 100.000 pieces of gold to his officers.

Although their large fleet had come out mostly unscathed, there was large dissent within the Holy League due to their actions in battle. Due to prior hostility between Venice and Genoa, Cappello accused Doria of sabotaging the battle to not risk Hispano-Genoese ships, saving them for future operations outside the League, while leaving the ships of Venice to be destroyed, so the republic could be weakened and submitted to the emperor. Papal captain Virginio Orsini even accused Doria of being secretly in collusion with Barbarossa; it was entertained that the black paint of the Spanish and Genoese ships was meant to make them distinguishable from the signature red of the Venetian ships, so Barbarossa could focus on attacking the latter. Sephardic scholar Joseph ha-Kohen proposed that God had confounded Doria's mind to punish him for mistreating Jewish prisoners in his campaigns.

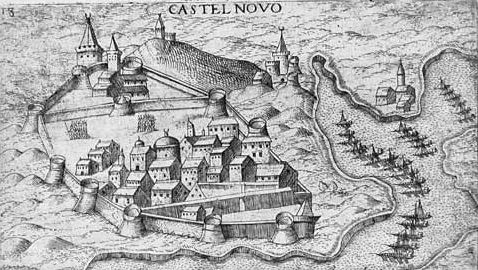
Fortress of Castelnuovo.

These considerations were amped by a lack of Imperial response. While carrying himself the version favorable to Doria, emissary Hernando Girón urged Imperial and Genoese representatives not to criticize the Venetians' actions during the battle, hoping not to worsen the morale of the Holy League. Similarly declining to present charges against Venice, although critic of them, Doria insisted for the League to continue the campaign. The Venetian senate also abstained from directly accusing Doria, blaming the weather instead, although they ordered their ambassador in the Imperial court to prepare for possible accusations against the republic.

The League next captured the fortress of Castelnuovo, present day Herceg Novi, Montenegro, to form a beachhead for an invasion of the Ottoman Balkans. Spaniards and Venetians fought over who would garrison Castelnuovo. To ease tensions, Charles V offered Venice permanent control over the fortress, but was rejected, as the Venetians claimed to lack the means to defend it. Venice had already started negotiations with the Ottomans. Barbarossa launched an expedition to recover the fortress the following year, leading to the famed Siege of Castelnuovo. He captured almost all of the remaining Christian outposts in the Ionian and Aegean Seas.

In October 1540, negotiations between Charles V and Barbarossa still lasted, although Imperial liaison Francisco Duarte believed them to be increasingly unlikely. The same month, a peace treaty was signed between Venice and the Ottoman Empire with the help of Franco-Ottoman diplomacy. The treaty had a heavy cost on the Venetians, as the Ottomans gained control of the Venetian possessions in the Peloponnese and Dalmatia and the former Venetian islands in the Aegean, Ionian and Eastern Mediterranean sea. Venice also paid a war compensation of 300,000 ducats in gold to the Ottoman Empire.

With the victory at Preveza and the subsequent victory at the Battle of Djerba in 1560, the Ottomans became the dominant naval power in the Mediterranean for thirty years. With Venice electing to sue for peace, the western alliances could not match the Ottoman navy. Ottoman superiority in similar battles remained unchallenged until the Battle of Lepanto in 1571. The experience of the galleons during the battle, where they managed to repel large numbers of enemy galleys by superior firewpower, influenced western shipbuilding, leading to the development of galleasses, which would prove their value in lepanto.

== Bibliography ==
- Braudel, Fernand (2023). The Mediterranean and the Mediterranean World in the Age of Philip II. University of California Press.
- Crowley, Roger (2008). Empires of the Sea: The Final Battle for the Mediterranean 1521–1580. Faber & Faber. ISBN 978-0571232314.
- Fernández Duro, Cesáreo (1895). Armada Española, desde la unión de los reinos de Castilla y Aragón, tomo I. Instituto de Historia Naval.
- García Cereceda, Martín (1873). Tratado de las campañas y otros acontecimientos de los ejércitos del emperador Carlos V en Italia, Francia, Austria, Berberia y Grecia desde 1521 hasta 1545 · Tomo 12, Parte 1. Indiana University.
- Hattendorf, John; King, Ernest (2013). Naval Strategy and Power in the Mediterranean: Past, Present and Future. Routledge. ISBN 978-1-136-71317-0.
- Lane-Poole, Stanley (1890). The Barbary Corsairs. Fisher Unwin.
- Merriman, Roger (1944). Suleiman the Magnificent, 1520-1566. Oxford University Press.
- Pellegrini, Marco (2015). Guerra santa contro i turchi: La crociata impossibile di Carlo V. Mulino.
- Setton, Kenneth M. (1984). The Papacy and the Levant, 1204-1571. American Philosophical Society.
- Vandenesse, Jean (1988). Journal des voyages de Charles-Quint. Gachard.
