= Ottoman–Maltese wars =

There have been several Ottoman–Maltese wars:

- Conquest of Tunis (1535)
- Battle of Preveza
- Algiers expedition (1541)
- Invasion of Gozo (1551)
- Siege of Tripoli (1551)
- Battle of Djerba
- Great Siege of Malta
- Battle of Lepanto
- Raid on Żejtun
- War of Candia
- Morean War
- War of Corfu
