= Ottoman–Venetian War (1537–1540) =

War between the Ottoman Empire and the Republic of Venice

Third Ottoman–Venetian War
- Part of the Ottoman–Venetian wars and Spanish–Ottoman wars
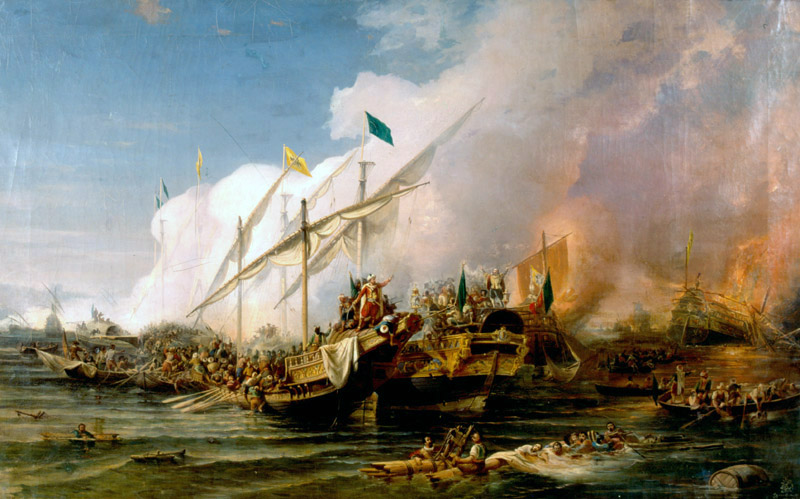
- The "Battle of Preveza" (1538) by Ohannes Umed Behzad, painted in 1866.
| Date | 23 July 1537 – 2 October 1540 (3 years, 2 months, 1 week and 2 days) |
| Location | Mediterranean Sea |
| Result | Ottoman victory |

Belligerents
| Holy League: Republic of Venice Spanish Empire: Kingdom of Naples; Kingdom of Sicily; Republic of Genoa; Papal States (Sovereign Military Order of Malta) Knights of Malta | Ottoman Empire; France (until 1538) |

Commanders and leaders
| (Genoa) Andrea Doria (Republic of Venice) Vincenzo Cappello; Marco Grimani (Mantua) Ferrante Gonzaga (Spanish Empire) Francisco de Sarmiento † | (Ottoman Empire) Suleiman I (Ottoman Empire) Hayreddin Barbarossa (Ottoman Empire) Şehzade Mehmed (Ottoman Empire) Turgut Reis (Ottoman Empire) Seydi Ali Reis (Ottoman Empire) Salih Reis (Ottoman Empire) Sinan Reis (Ottoman Empire) Ayas Mehmed Pasha |

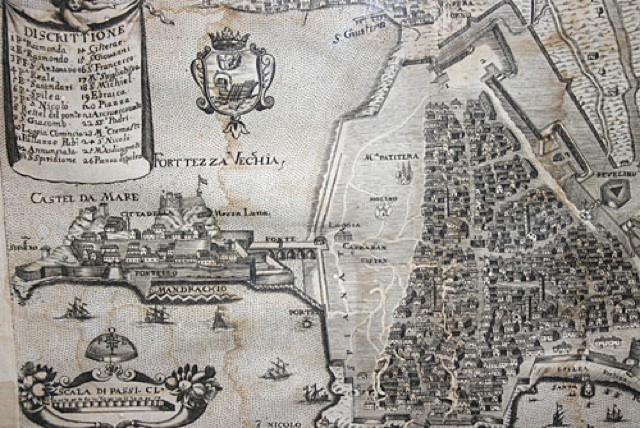
The French and Ottoman fleets joined at the Siege of Corfu in early September 1537.

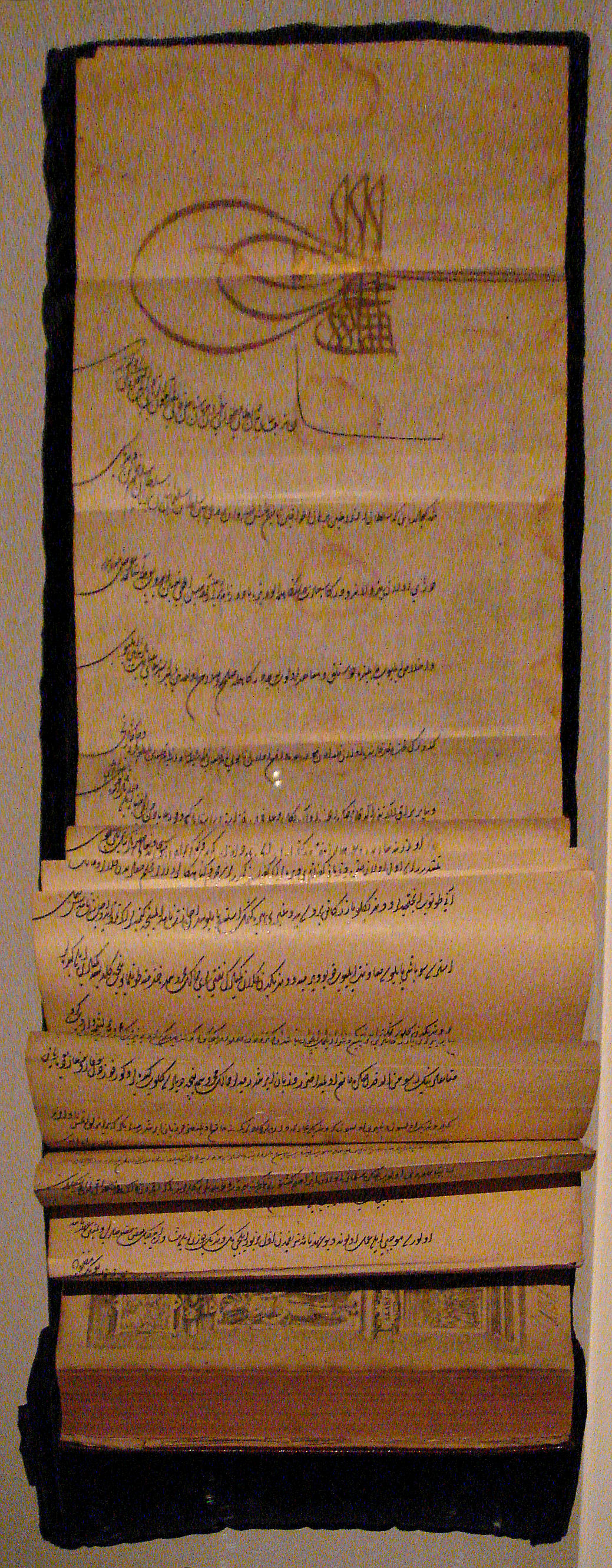
Capitulation reopening trade between Venice and the Ottoman Empire signed 2 October 1540, following the Ottoman–Venetian War.

The Third Ottoman–Venetian War (1537–1540) was one of the Ottoman–Venetian wars which took place during the 16th century. The war arose out of the Franco-Ottoman alliance between Francis I of France and Süleyman I of the Ottoman Empire against the Holy Roman Emperor Charles V. The initial plan between the two had been to jointly invade Italy, Francis through Lombardy in the North and Süleyman through Apulia to the South. However, the proposed invasion failed to take place.

== Background ==
In what became known as the Italian War of 1536–1538, Francis's invasion of Piedmont, having made modest territorial gains, was halted by Genoa, an ally of Charles V. Furthermore, he was not able to put all his resources against the city as he also had to fend off Charles V's invasion of Provence. At the same time, Süleyman was not yet ready to engage in a large-scale invasion of the Kingdom of Naples thus not giving Francis any relief. Ottoman troops were landed in Otranto from their encampment in Valona on July 23, 1537 but these were pulled out within a month when it became clear that Francis was not going to invade Lombardy. However, the landing and raiding of Ottoman soldiers in Apulia and the presence of the large Ottoman fleet in the Strait of Otranto did generate considerable fear in Rome that a large-scale invasion would follow.

At the same time, crisis in Venetian-Ottoman relations was developing during the siege of Klis - the last Habsburg stronghold in Dalmatia, that fell in March 1537. The Venetian government feared that Turkish forces would attack Dalmatian cities and resorted to diplomatic efforts in order to avoid the war. These fears were further strengthened when following the Battle of Antipaxos against imperial admiral Andrea Doria, the Ottomans suddenly laid siege to the Venetian Island of Corfu in the Adriatic (Siege of Corfu 1537), thus breaking the peace treaty signed with Venice in 1502. On Corfu, the Ottomans faced formidable resistance and defenses specifically designed to counter Ottoman artillery. The siege lasted less than two weeks, and afterward Süleyman withdrew his forces and returned east to spend the winter in Adrianople.

These events resolved Pope Paul III of the need to form a Holy League (1538) to combat and to deter the Ottoman assaults that were expected in the next year. Through intense diplomacy the Pope stopped the war between Charles V and Francis I with the Truce of Nice and secured Charles's support. Venice also joined the league but only reluctantly and after much debate in the senate.

== The war ==
The Ottoman fleet had grown greatly in size as well as in competence over the course of the 16th century and was now headed by the former corsair turned admiral Hayreddin Barbarossa Pasha. In the summer of 1538 the Ottomans turned their attention to the remaining Venetian possessions in the Aegean capturing the islands of Andros, Naxos, Paros, and Santorini, as well as taking the last two Venetian settlements on the Peloponnese Monemvasia and Navplion. The Ottomans next turned their focus to the Adriatic. Here, in what the Venetians considered their home waters, the Ottomans, through the combined use of their navy and their army in Albania, captured a string of forts in Dalmatia and formally secured their hold there.

The most important battle of the war was the Battle of Préveza, which the Ottomans won thanks to the strategy of Barbarossa, Seydi Ali Reis, and Turgut Reis, as well as bad management of the Holy League. After taking Kotor, the supreme commander of the League's navy the Genoese Andrea Doria managed to trap Barbarossa's navy in the Ambracian Gulf. This was to Barbarossa's advantage however as he was supported by the Ottoman army in Préveza while Doria, unable to lead a general assault for fear of Ottoman artillery, had to wait in the open sea. Eventually Doria signaled a retreat at which time Barbarossa attacked leading to a major Ottoman victory. The events of this battle, as well as the events of the Siege of Castelnuovo (1539) put a stop to any Holy League plans to bring the fight to the Ottomans in their own territory and coerced the League to begin talks to end the war. The war was particularly painful to the Venetians as they lost most of the rest of their foreign holdings as well as showing them that they could no longer take on even the Ottoman navy alone.

A peace treaty or "capitulation" was signed between Venice and the Ottoman Empire to end the war on 2 October 1540. The Venetian negotiator and signatory was Alvise Badoer. Venice ratified the treaty on 20 November.

== Consequences ==
In the period between the start of the Second Ottoman–Venetian War in 1499 and the end of this war in 1540, the Ottoman Empire made significant advances in the Dalmatian hinterland – it didn't occupy the Venetian cities, but it took the Kingdom of Hungary's Croatian possessions between Skradin and Karin, eliminating them as a buffer zone between the Ottoman and Venetian territory. The economy of the Venetian cities in Dalmatia, severely impacted by the Turkish occupation of the hinterland in the previous war, recovered and held steady even throughout this war.

The Battle of Preveza was the Ottomans' greatest naval victory against Westerners.

== See also ==
- Ottoman–Venetian Wars
