= Puebla del Salvador =

- municipality
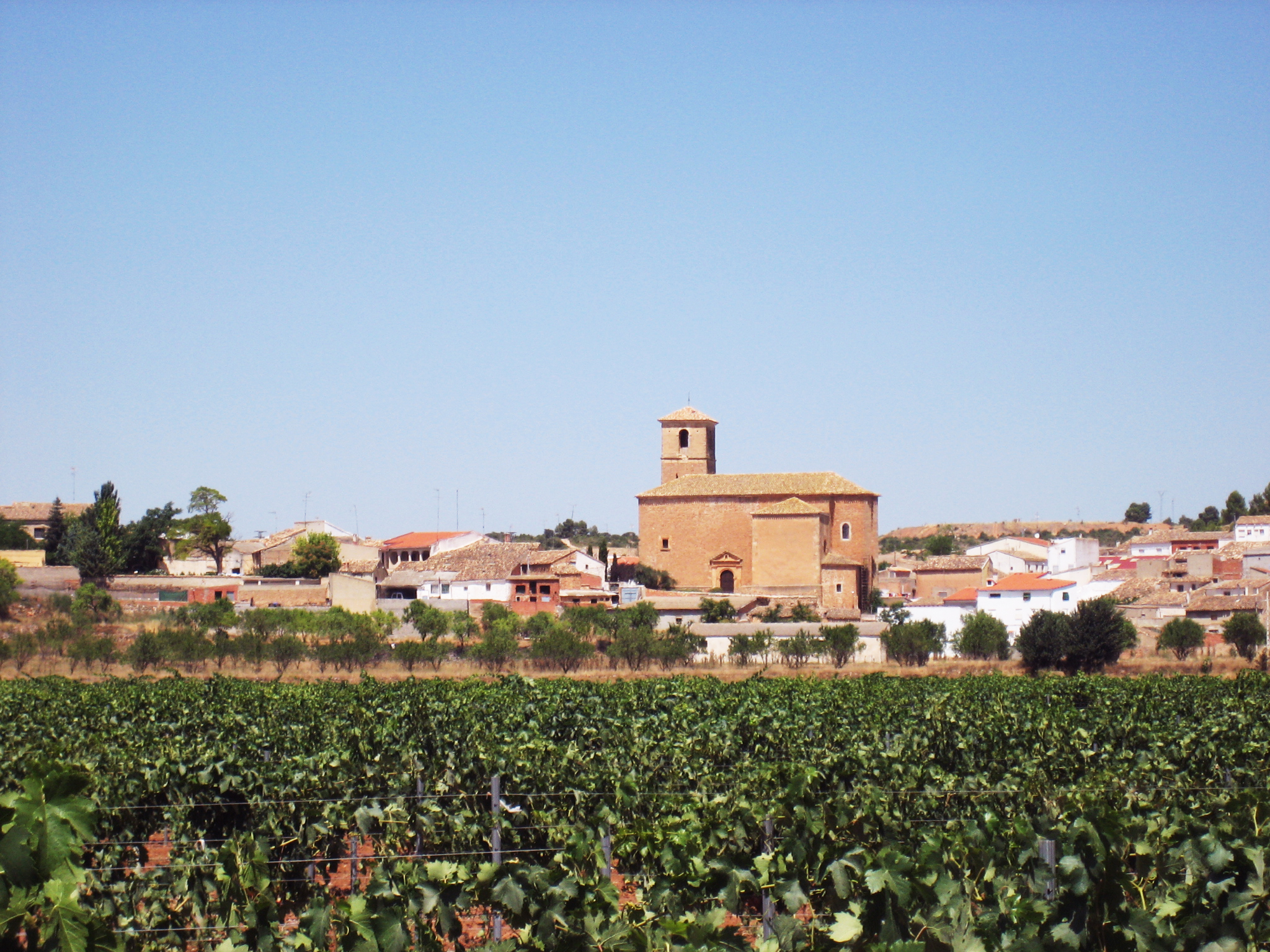
- South view of Puebla del Salvador

- Flag Coat of arms

- Location within Spain Location within Castilla-La Mancha
- Country: Spain
- Autonomous community: Castile-La Mancha
- Province: Cuenca
- Municipality: Puebla del Salvador

Area
  - Total: 47 km^{2} (18 sq mi)

Population (2025-01-01)
  - Total: 190
  - Density: 4.0/km^{2} (10/sq mi)
- Time zone: UTC+1 (CET)
  - Summer (DST): UTC+2 (CEST)

Puebla del Salvador is a municipality located in the province of Cuenca, Castile-La Mancha, Spain. According to the 2022 census (INE), the municipality has a population of 192 inhabitants.

== History ==
=== The visit of the emperor Carlos V ===
On December 19, 1542, royal chronicler Jean de Vandenesse recorded the overnight stay of the royal procession in Puebla del Salvador. This was a procession that accompanied the Holy Roman Emperor, Carlos V and Prince Felipe II to Madrid.

== Holidays ==
As is common in most towns, the festive calendar of Puebla del Salvador has two types of celebrations; religious and ones based on tradition. The religious celebrations celebrate saints recognized by the village. The celebrations based on tradition are usually related to the land, fertility, courtship, etc.

Celebration	date
The feast of Epiphany (Three Kings Day)	January 6
Saint Isidro (the laborer)	May 15
Saint Quiteria (virgin martyr and saint)	May 28
El Salvador (The Savior)	August 6
Assumption of the Blessed Virgin Mary	August 15

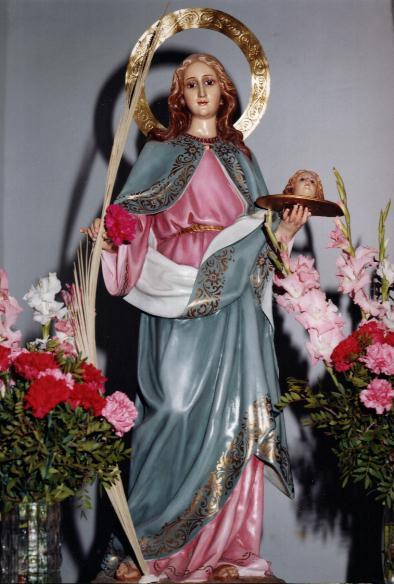
Saint Quiteria

== Demography ==
The municipality has a surface area of 48.09 km^{2}. In 2022 the population was 192 inhabitants with a density of 3.99 inhab/km^{2}.

The population breakdown summary is as follows:

- 11.46% of the population is under the age of 20
- 20.31% of the population is between the ages of 20-40
- 22.92% of the population is between the ages of 40-60
- 45.31% of the population is over the age of 60

== Politics ==
Mayors since the 1979 election
Time Period	Name	Political Party
1979-1983	Federico Ruiz Tórtola	Independiente
1983-1987	Lino Álvarez	PSOE
1987-1991	Francisco Blasco Coronado	PSOE
1991-1995	Rafael Ruiz García	PP
1995-1999	Julián Jiménez Villena	PSOE
1999-2003	Julián Jiménez Villena	PSOE
2003-2007	Maria Luz Martínez Huerta	PP
2007-2011	Yolanda Oviedo Jiménez	PSOE
2011-2015	Yolanda Oviedo Jiménez	PSOE
2015-2019	Inmaculada Jiménez Gómez (2015-2017) Jaime Martínez Gabaldón (2017-)	PSOE PP
2019-2023	Jaime Martínez Gabaldón	PP
2023-present	Jaime Martínez Gabaldón	PP
