= Bab El Fellah =

Coordinates: 36.787336°N 10.178221°E

- Arabic: باب الفلة
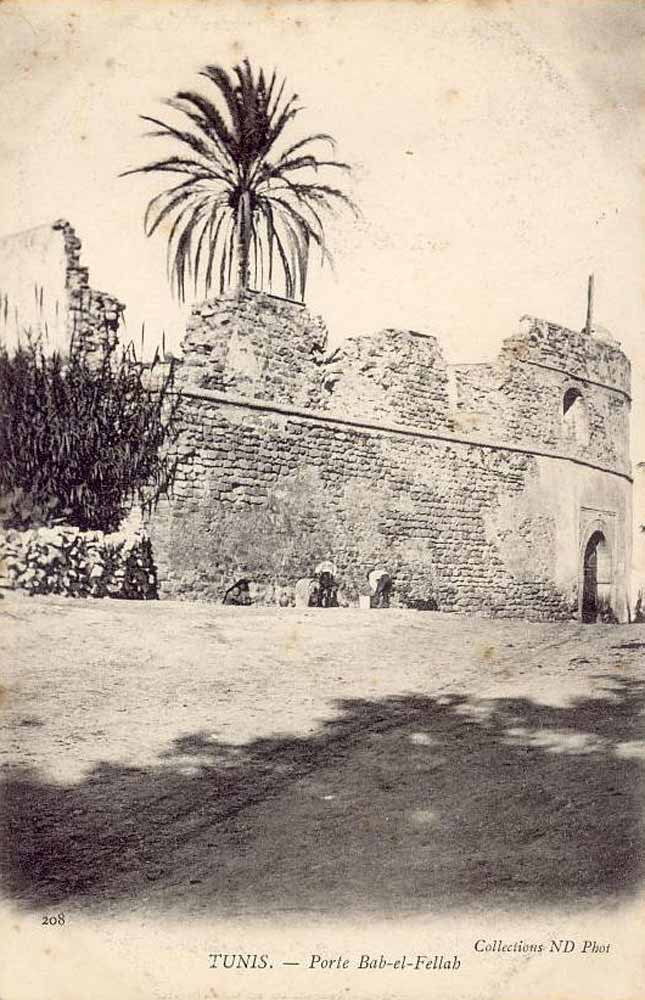
- Bab El Fellah in 1890
- Etymology: "Gate of the Breach", for a breach of the medina walls in the 1535 conquest of Tunis

General information
- Town or city: Tunis
- Country: Tunisia
- Destroyed: c. 1890

Bab El Fellah (Arabic: باب الفلة) was one of the gates of the medina of Tunis.

Also called "Door of the Breach", it is located on the second enclosure of the southern suburbs of Tunis. Built around 1350, it plays an important economic role because its situation near the agricultural plain and on the roads of Zaghouan and Kairouan.

According to an ancient tradition, beside this door, there was a wide breach which allowed the flight of the Tunisians during the battle of Tunis in 1535.
