= Alvise Badoer =

Venitian politician (c. 1483–1554)

Alvise Badoer (c. 1483 – 7 January 1554) was a Venetian patrician, lawyer, administrator and diplomat. He played a major role in the Ottoman–Venetian War of 1537–1540. He advocated for and helped arrange the Holy League in 1537–1538, took command of Venetian Dalmatia in 1538–1539 and negotiated the peace treaty in 1540.

== Early life ==
Badoer, whose first name may also be spelled Aloisio or Luigi, was born around 1483. His father was Arrigo Badoer. He practiced law and grew a reputation for eloquence before obtaining his first public office in 1531, being elected avogadore di Comun extraordinary for the purpose of investigating the leadership of the army. He accused several leading generals of embezzlement and misuse of funds, including Polo Nani, Francesco Gritti and Giovanni Vitturi. He was subsequently elected an ordinary avogadore di Comun, but from 1533 on he was restricted to the minor office of Correttor alle Leggi for some years owing to the enemies he had made.

== Ottoman war ==
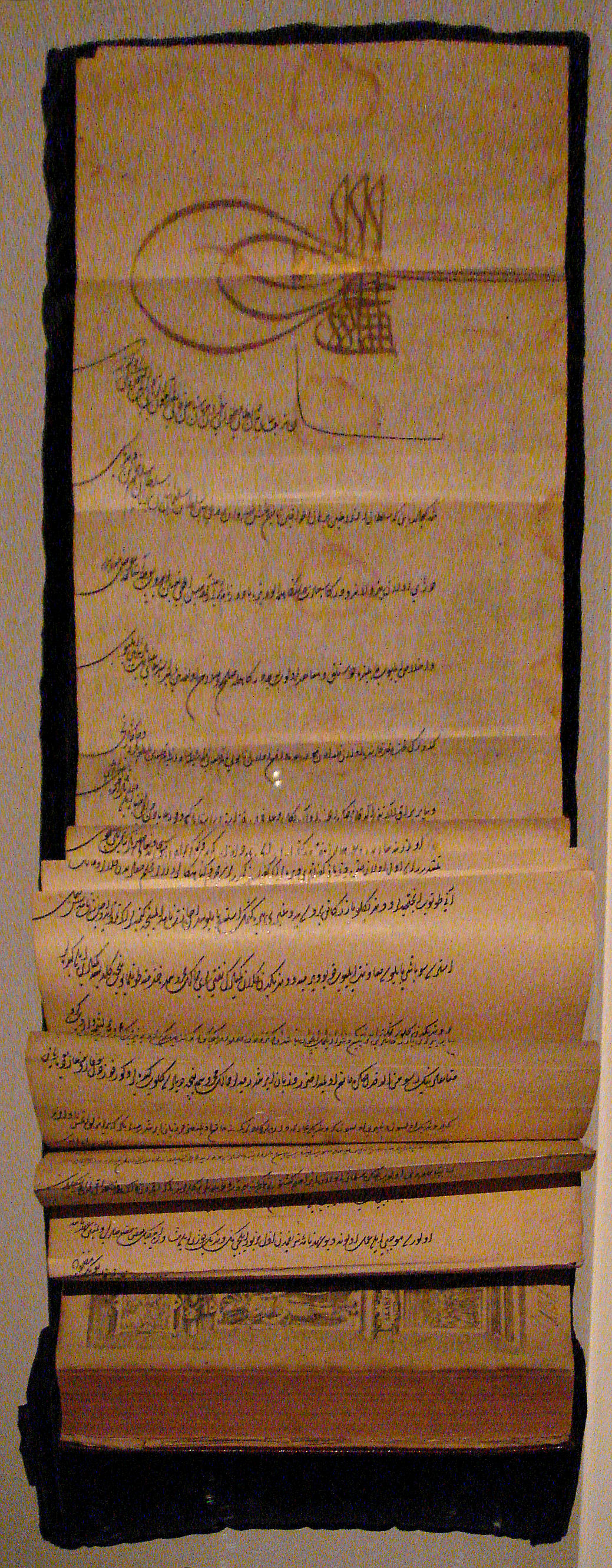
The peace treaty negotiated by Badoer

Badoer was elected to the Senate in 1537. During the war with the Ottoman Empire that began that year, he favoured an alliance with the Holy Roman Empire over one with France. The Senate ultimately approved the Holy League with the Empire on 13 September. A few days later, Badoer was elected a savio di Terraferma. On 20 October, he was sent as a special envoy to the Emperor Charles V in Spain. He remained there until the league was formalized on 8 February 1538. He was back in Venice by April.

On 3 May 1538, Badoer was elected provveditore generale of Dalmatia, with authority over the governor general Camillo Orsini. His duty was to defend Dalmatia from the Ottomans and to go on the offensive. One of his orders was to remove "from all the territories and lands of Dalmatia all those who ask to be removed, women, children and other useless persons, keeping in Dalmatia only those able to fight". To this end, he resettled two thousand families of Morlachs in Istria. Upon his return to Venice in early 1539, he was elected savio di Terraferma and undertook an inspection tour of the fortresses of the Terraferma.

Although Badoer at advocated a more offensive role for the Venetian navy soon after his return to Venice, reverses in Dalmatia convinced him to change his mind before the end of the year. On 27 December 1539, he was elected to succeed Tommaso Contarini as ambassador to the Ottomans to negotiate a peace treaty. He opened negotiations in Constantinople on 25 April. His secret instructions, however, had been acquired by France, which handed them over to the Ottomans. He signed a treaty on 2 October 1540 and it was ratified by the Senate on 20 November.

== Later life ==
Although the Senate affirmed that Badoer had followed his instructions, he was deeply unpopular in Venice. Francesco Pisani and Andrea Loredan accused him of embezzlement during his governorship in Dalmatia. He returned to Constantinople, but was back in Venice by August 1542, when he reported to the Senate that the Ottomans had known his secret instructions. As a result, the traitors (Costantino and Nicolò Cavazza) were discovered and Badoer avoided arrest on Pisani and Loredan's accusations. His political career, however, was over.

Badoer was elected to the honorary position of censor in 1545. He was still renowned for his oratorical skills. Giovan Maria Memmo in his Oratore (1545) called him the "prince of orators" (prencipe degli oratori). In 1553, he was named one of the Regolatori delle Leggi. He died on 7 January 1554. He had a son named Ferigo who helped uncover the treason of 1540.

== Bibliography ==
- Caciur, Dana (2015). "Considerations Regarding the Morlachs Migrations from Dalmatia to Istria and the Venetian Settlement Policy during the 16th Century". Balcanica Posnaniensia Acta et Studia. 22 (1): 57–71.
- Iordanou, Ioanna (2019). Venice's Secret Service: Organizing Intelligence in the Renaissance. Oxford University Press.
- Ventura, Angelo (1963). "Badoer, Alvise". Dizionario Biografico degli Italiani (in Italian). Vol. 5: Bacca–Baratta. Rome: Istituto dell'Enciclopedia Italiana. OCLC 883370.
