= Conquerors: How Portugal Forged the First Global Empire =

2015 book by Roger Crowley

- First edition (UK)
- Author: Roger Crowley
- Language: English
- Subject: Early Portuguese activities in the Indian Ocean
- Genre: History
- Publisher: Faber & Faber (UK); Random House (US)
- Publication date: 15 September 2015 (UK); 1 December 2015 (US)
- Publication place: United Kingdom
- Pages: 365
- ISBN: 978-0-571-29090-1

Conquerors: How Portugal Forged the First Global Empire is a 2015 history book by historian Roger Crowley.

== Summary ==
Conquerors focuses on the early history of the Portuguese presence in Asia, specifically the period from the early Portuguese attempts to reach Asia by sailing around Africa to the death of Afonso de Albuquerque. Crowley was noted for his comparison of the voyages of the Portuguese to the Ming treasure voyages.

== Reception ==
Conquerors received generally positive reviews from critics. Michael Duggan of the Irish Examiner described it as "Eye-opening, thought-provoking popular history". David Walton of the Dallas Morning News called it "a riveting tale" and praised its depiction of naval combat. Nick Romeo, writing in the Christian Science Monitor, declared that it had "incredible dramatic immediacy" and that it was "nuanced and fair".

Ian Morris of the New York Times praised the book for its "craftsmanship" and the style of its storytelling. Matthew Price, writing in The National, gave a generally positive review, declaring that it "burst with action", while also finding that its descriptions could get somewhat repetitive. Jerry Brotton of The Telegraph gave a more mixed review, giving the book 3 out of 5 stars and describing it as "pacy but predictable".
