= Roger Crowley =

British historian and author

- Born: 1951 (age 74–75)
- Education: Emmanuel College, University of Cambridge
- Occupation: Historian
- Writing career
- Period: 2005–present
- Genres: Maritime and Mediterranean history

Roger Crowley (born 1951) is a British historian and author known for his books on maritime and Mediterranean history.

== Life and career ==
Roger Crowley was educated at Sherborne School and read English at Emmanuel College Cambridge. As the child of a naval family, early experiences of life in Malta gave him a deep interest in the history and culture of the Mediterranean world, which has remained the major subject of his work. He has travelled widely in the Greek-speaking world, taught English in Istanbul and walked across Western Turkey. He worked for many years as a publisher before pursuing a full-time writing career. He is married and lives in England in the Gloucestershire countryside.

He has a reputation for writing compelling narrative history based on original sources and eyewitness accounts combined with careful scholarship. He is the author of a loose trilogy of books on the history of the Mediterranean: Constantinople: The Last Great Siege/1453 (2005), drawing on his interest in Istanbul, Empires of the Sea (2008) about the contest for the Mediterranean between the Ottomans and Christian Europe, which was a Sunday Times (UK) History Book of the Year in 2009 and a New York Times Bestseller – and City of Fortune on Venice’s maritime empire (2011). These were followed by Conquerors: How Portugal Forged the First Global Empire (2015), an account of early Portuguese activities in the Indian Ocean, and Accursed Tower: The Crusaders' Last Battle for the Holy Land (Yale, 2019), which chronicles the end of the crusades and the fall of Akko in 1291. His latest book, Spice: The 16th-Century Contest That Shaped the Modern World (Yale, 2024), explores the various expeditions led by European powers to reach and extend control over the Spice Islands. His books have been translated into more than twenty languages.

Roger has talked to audiences as diverse as Melvyn Bragg’s BBC programme In Our Time, the Center Analyses in Washington, NATO, the Hay Festival, and the National Maritime Museum, appeared on TV programmes, written articles and reviews, and lectured to tour groups.

== Bibliography ==
- "The First Global Empire" History Today (2015) 656#10 pp 10–17 online

=== Books ===
- 1453: The Holy War for Constantinople and the Clash of Islam and the West. New York: Hachette Books, 2005.(US edition) ISBN 9781401308506
- Great Constantinople: The Last Siege. London: Faber, 2005.(UK edition) ISBN 9780571298204
- Empires of the Sea: The Siege of Malta, the Battle of Lepanto, and the Contest for the Center of the World. New York: Random House, 2008. (US edition) ISBN 9780812977646 (UK edition) London: Faber, 2008. ISBN 9780571298198
- City of Fortune: How Venice Ruled the Seas. New York: Random House, 2012. (US edition) ISBN 9780812980226 (UK edition) London: Faber, 2012. ISBN 9780571245956
- Conquerors: How Portugal Forged the First Global Empire. New York: Random House, 2015. ISBN 9780812994001 (UK edition) London: Faber, 2015. ISBN 9780571290901
- Accursed Tower: The Crusaders' Last Battle for the Holy Land. London: Yale University Press, 2019 (UK edition) ISBN 9780300230314 (US edition) Basic Books, 2019. ISBN 9781541697348
- Spice: The 16th-Century Contest That Shaped the Modern World. London: Yale University Press, 2024. ISBN 9780300267471
