= Sinan Reis =

Ottoman pirate of the 16th century

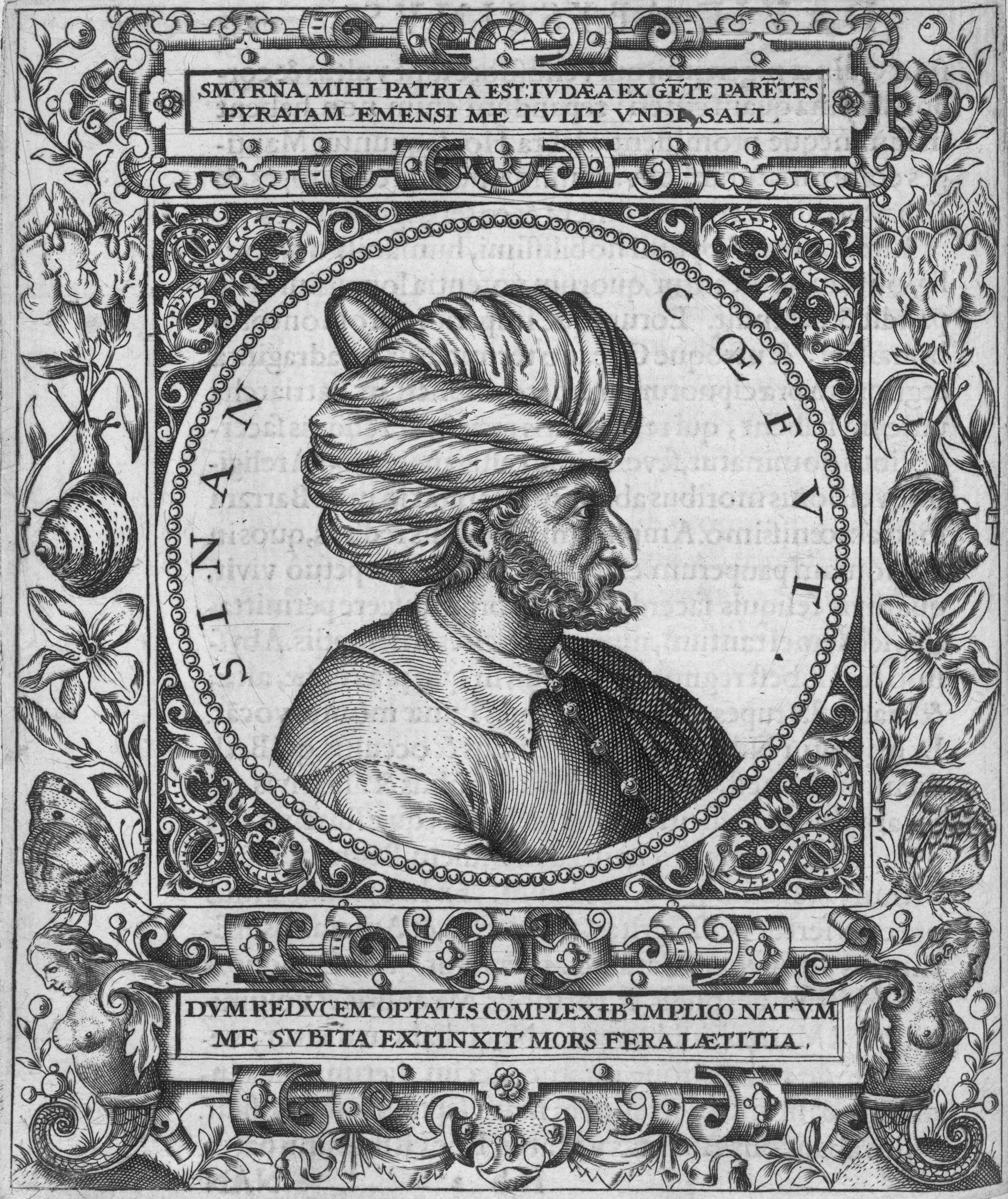
- Engraving of Sinan Reis
- Nicknames: The Great Jew; Sinan the Chief; The Famous Jewish Pirate; Sinan the Jew
- Born: c. before 1533; Spain
- Died: 1546 Ottoman Empire
- Allegiance: Ottoman Empire
- Branch: Ottoman Navy
- Service years: c. before 1533-unknown
- Rank: Admiral
- Conflicts: Battle of Preveza

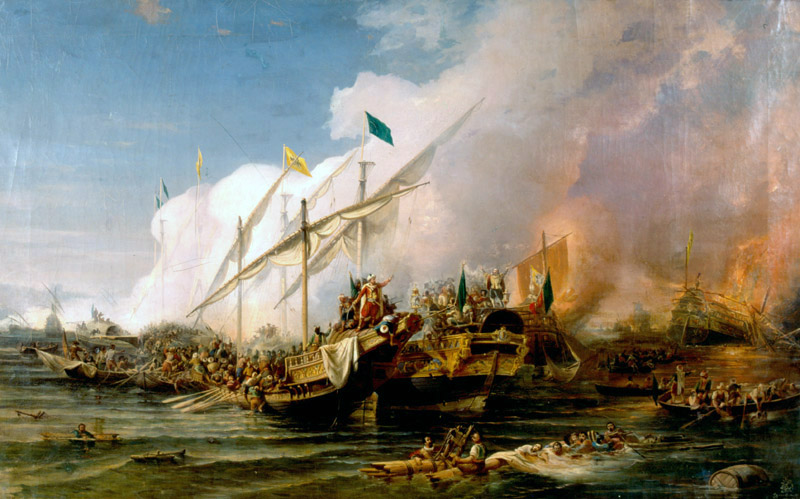
Barbarossa Hayreddin Pasha's force defeats the Holy League of Charles V under the command of Andrea Doria at the Battle of Preveza in 1538. Sinan Reis' leadership was key to the Ottoman victory.

Sinan Reis, also known as Ciphut Sinan, (Hebrew: סנאן ראיס, Sinan Rais; Arabic: سنان ريس, Sinan Rayyis;) "Sinan the Chief", "Yahudi Sinan", and Portuguese: Sinão o Judeo, "Sinan the Jew", was a Barbary corsair who joined the Ottoman Navy and sailed under and was second in command of the Ottoman admiral Hayreddin Barbarossa.

== Life ==
=== Origins ===
There are two competing explanations for Sinan Reis' epithet, "the Jew". While Ottoman sources are generally silent about his origins, most modern works assert that he was born to a Sephardic Jewish family which fled Spain or Portugal and possibly relocated to the then Ottoman ruled Smyrna, Sinan sailed as a Barbary corsair, a type of privateer or pirate, under the Ottoman flag. There are several cases of Jews who upon fleeing Iberia turned to attacking the Empire's shipping, a profitable strategy of revenge for the Inquisition's religious persecution.

Other sources claim that "the Jew" does not refer to Jewish origins. Sixteenth-century chronicler Francisco Lopez de Gómara argued that he was called "the Jew" because Sinan Reis once escaped from Christian ships while the 19th-century editor of his text speculated, not quite so understandably, that interest in astrology earned him his nickname.

=== Corsair ===
Sinan was based out of Mediterranean points including Santorini, and fought in several key battles against the Spanish and the Holy Roman Empire, at the time ruled by the same man, Charles V.

The English State Papers of 1533 bear evidence of his actions:

As to Coron, it was reported at Rome a few days ago that Andrea Doria was informed that the famous Jewish pirate had prepared a strong fleet to meet the Spanish galleys which are to join Doria's nineteen

His moniker "the Great Jew", appears in a 1528 reference by the Governor of Portuguese India, who mistakenly believed that Sinan was sent by Suleiman the Magnificent to aid the King of Calicut.

Sinan sailed under the famed Ottoman admiral Hayreddin Barbarossa at the 1538 Battle of Preveza against Charles' Imperial fleet and its commander, Andrea Doria. Sinan suggested landing troops at Actium on the Gulf of Arta near Preveza, an idea which Barbarossa initially opposed, but which later proved to be important for securing the Ottoman victory.

The Spanish hired Christian forces to protect the barbary coast from the corsairs. Sinan led the battle and the defeat of the Genoan navy hired by the Spanish.

He commanded 6,000 troops, stationed in Tripoli, Libya. Sinan's soldiers, who were initially stationed in a fortress, eventually conquered the city. It is said Sinan was so angry by the resistance put up against him in Tripoli that he imprisoned the entire enemy garrison save a few.

Sinan Reis died in 1546. It is said that he died just days before a planned departure for a raiding mission to the coast of India.

== Not to be mistaken ==
Sinan (the pirate) is not the Sinan buried in a Jewish cemetery in Albania, because that refers to the grave of Kapudan Sinan (Sinanüddin Yusuf) Pasha (admiral of the Ottoman fleet 1550–1553) who lies buried near his mosque in Üsküdar (Istanbul). (The Turkish word for Scutari in Albania is also Üsküdar).

== See also ==
- Samuel Pallache
- Barbary slave trade
