= Conquest of Tunis (1535) =

Capture of Tunis by Habsburg alliance in 1535

Coordinates: 36°48′N 10°10′E

- Part of the Spanish–Ottoman wars, the Ottoman–Habsburg wars and the Ottoman–Portuguese conflicts
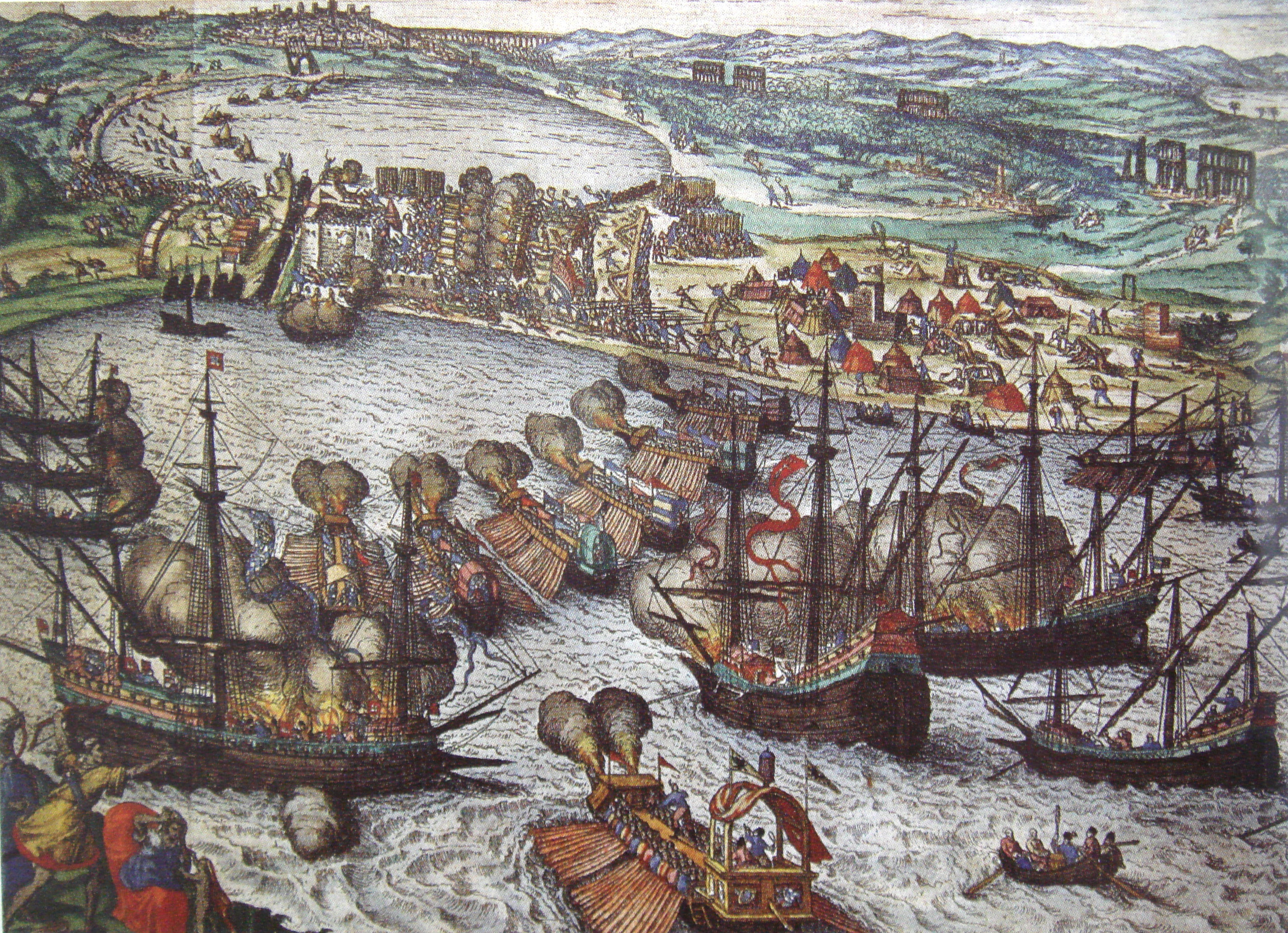
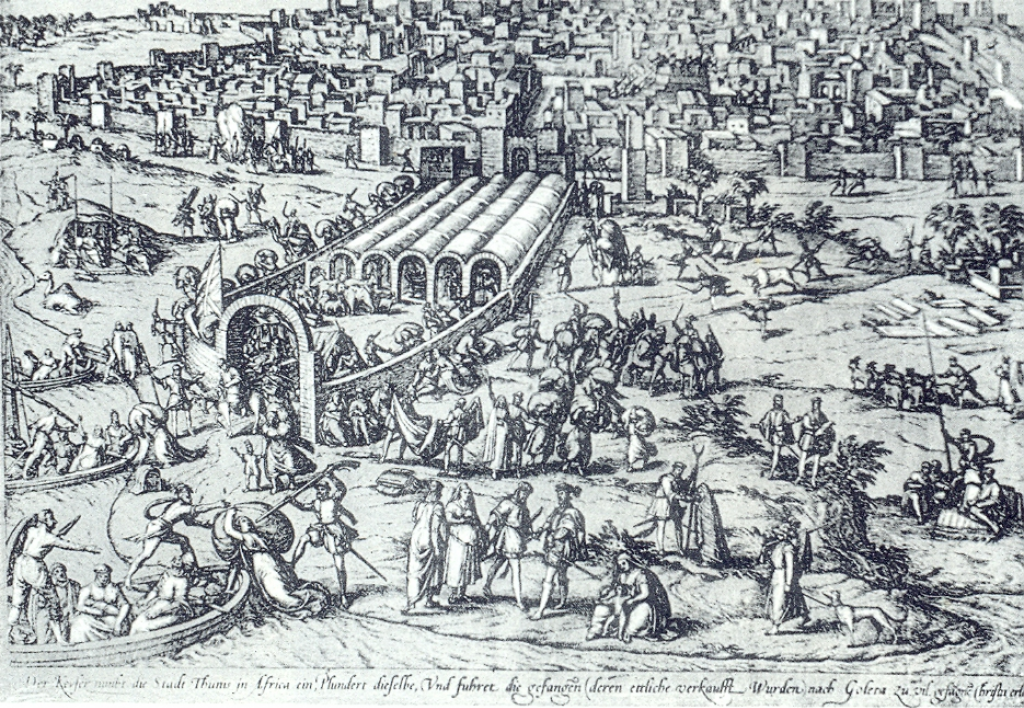
- Attack on La Goletta, with Tunis in the background Entry of Charles V, Holy Roman Emperor, into Tunis in 1535
Date	June–August 1535
Location	Tunis (present-day Tunisia)
Result	Habsburg and allied victory
Territorial changes	Muley Hassan of the Hafsid dynasty restored as client ruler of Tunis and Spanish-Imperial tributary

Belligerents
(Spain) Spanish Empire: Kingdom of Naples; Kingdom of Sicily; Republic of Genoa; County of Flanders; Holy Roman Empire Kingdom of Portugal; Papal States; Knights of Malta	Ottoman Empire; Kingdom of France

Commanders and leaders
(Holy Roman Empire) (Spain) Charles V (Republic of Genoa) Andrea Doria (Spain) Alfonso d'Avalos (Spain) Álvaro de Bazán (Spain) García de Toledo (Spain) Duke of Alba; Infante Luís	Hayreddin Barbarossa; Hasan Agha; Sinan Reis; Salah Rais; Aydın Reis (DOW)

Strength
Total men: 30,000–60,000; 10,000 Spaniards; 8,000 Germans; 8,000 Italians; 1,500 Portuguese; 700 Maltese; Unknown number of Flemings Total ships: 400 (Spain) 207 ships 10 galleys (Kingdom of Naples) 6 galleys (Republic of Genoa) 19 galleys 1 galleon, 2 carracks, 20 round caravels, 8 galleys (Papal States) 8 galleys (Sovereign Military Order of Malta) 1 carrack, 4 galleys (Flanders) 60 hulks	Total men: 130,000; 8,000 Turks; 23,000 Moors; Unknown number of mercenaries and militiamen Total ships: 100; 82 galleys, galliots and fustas 27 sailing ships

Casualties and losses
Unknown	High casualties Most ships captured 30,000 Muslim civilians killed 10,000 Muslims enslaved 20,000 Christians freed

The Conquest of Tunis (called Jornada de Túnez in Spanish sources) in 1535 occurred when the Holy Roman Emperor Charles V and his allies captured the city of Tunis from the control of the Ottoman Empire. The Catholic fleet, which included admirals Andrea Doria and Bazán the Elder, captured the fleet of grand Ottoman admiral Hayreddin Barbarossa, who had turned Tunis into his naval base for future invasions of Italy and Spain. Although Barbarossa managed to escape, the victory ensured Ottoman forces in North Africa remained limited to the usual actions of the Barbary corsairs. Tunis remained under Spanish control until its Ottoman recapture in 1569.

The conquest was one of the largest amphibious operations of the 16th century; historian Henry Kamen described it as "the most imposing ever mounted by Christian powers in the long history of the western Mediterranean". It was an unprecedented logistic achievement due to its proportions, complexity and relative quickness. It involved multiple types of ships, siege techniques and the intervention of the recently created tercios. Due to this and other successes, Charles founded officially the Spanish Marine Infantry, which remains the oldest still in existence.

With the advance of the Ottoman-Habsburg wars, the conquest of Tunis would be obscured in historiography by other battles, including failures like the Algiers expedition and victories like the battle of Lepanto. It was still recorded in many period pieces of art, most notably a series of tapestry works by Willem de Pannemaker.

== Background ==
In 1533, Suleiman the Magnificent ordered Hayreddin Barbarossa, whom he had summoned from Algiers, to build a large war fleet for Constantinople. Altogether 70 galleys were built in the winter of 1533–1534, manned by slave oarsmen, including 2,000 Jews. With this fleet, Barbarossa conducted aggressive raids along the coast of Italy, then conquered Tunis on 16 August 1534, ousting the theretofore local ruler, Muley Hasan, (Note: Also known as Muleassen in Italy, and Abu-Abd-Allah-Mohammed-el-Hasan in Tunis.) who had been subservient to the Spanish. Barbarossa established a strong naval base in Tunis, which could be used for raids in the region, and on nearby Malta.

Charles V was informed that should Barbarossa remain in power in Tunis, both Italy and Spain might be threatened by the Ottoman navy. He therefore assembled a large fleet to drive the Ottomans from the region. He recruited forces from the Republic of Genoa under his grand admiral Andrea Doria, the Spanish navy under Álvaro de Bazán the Elder, the Portuguese armada under his brother-in-law Infante Luís, the Papal fleet under Virginio Orsini and the Knights of Malta under Aurelio Botigela. The fleet would included some 30,000 soldiers, 74 galleys rowed by chained Protestants shipped in from Antwerp.

The expense involved for Charles V was considerable, and at 1,000,000 ducats on par with the cost of Charles' campaign against Suleiman on the Danube. Unexpectedly, the funding of the conquest of Tunis came from the galleons sailing in from the New World, in the form of two million gold ducats extracted by Francisco Pizarro for releasing the Inca king Atahualpa, whom he nevertheless executed on 29 August 1533.

Despite a request by Charles V, Francis I denied French support to the expedition, explaining that he was under a three-year truce with Barbarossa following the 1533 Ottoman embassy to France. Francis I was also in negotiations with Suleiman for a combined attack on Charles V following the 1534 Ottoman embassy, and quickly advised Barbarossa of Charles' intention. Francis I only agreed to Pope Paul III's request that no fight between Christians occur during the time of the expedition. King Henry VIII of England and the Republic of Venice were also invited, but declined. Charles sent Genoese spy, Luigi de Presenda, to rendezvous with the exiled Muley Hasan, but he was betrayed by a morisco partner and captured. Barbarossa interrogated Presenda, who falsely assured him the emperor could not gather more than 150 ships against him.

== Opposing forces ==
=== Charles V's armada ===
The Catholic fleet would be commanded by Andrea Doria on the sea and by Alfonso d'Avalos while on land. Other commanders in the fleet were Álvaro de Bazán the Elder, captain of the Spanish ships, as well as Luis Hurtado de Mendoza, 2nd Marquess of Mondéjar, along with his brother Bernardino de Mendoza, and a young Fernando Álvarez de Toledo, Duke of Alba. The Italian contingent would be captained by Fadrique de Carreto, Agostino Spinola and Girolamo Tutavilla, Count of Sarno, while Germans landsknecht would be commanded by Maximilian Eberstain. The Spanish tercios included veterans Francisco de Sarmiento and maestre de campo Rodrigo de Ripalda.

According to the sources, the fleet officially carried around 25,000 soldiers, including 13,000 Spanish, 5,000 Italians, 7,000-8,000 Germans and Netherlanders, 2,000 Portuguese and 700 Knights Hospitaller. Additionally, Martín García Cereceda, who participated in the expedition, mentions as many as 32,000 adventurers and 20,000 volunteers. Leaving aside possible exaggerations, Fernández Duro proposes 54,000 people in the fleet, counting sailors, adventurers, guests and the members of various retinues, including women, who were found by the thousands in the fleet despite female presence on board was forbidden. Cavalry would have been 2,000. Discipline in the army was noted to be impressive despite its size and variety, with only the Germans occasionally breaking it.

The armada gathered vessels from Spain, Genoa and Portugal, later increased with ships from the Netherlands, Naples and Sicily, and featuring allies from the Hospitaller, the Papal States and other Italian realms. The fleet was mixed; there were both rowing ships, like galleys, galiots and fustas, and sailing ships, including galleons, carracks and hulks. Chronicler Sandoval records 80 rowing ship and 250 sailing ships, although he records a source giving them as 145 and 275 respectively, without counting vessels belonging to adventurers. Cereceda gives a similar number, stating that the fleet featured 412 ships not counting very minor vessels. Reviewing them, Duro proposes around 100 rowing ships and 300 sailing ships. It was composed of:

- The private Genoese fleet of Andrea Doria, grand Imperial admiral and commander of the armada, with 19 galleys. They included the royal galley used by Charles V, the Capitana o Bastarda, a richly decorated, 26 bench quadrireme galley. Aside from these, Andrea's cousin Antonio Doria captained five more private galleys, along with nine other galleys from the Republic of Genoa. They also brought carracks and galleons, including a heavily armed grand galleon, commanded by their cousin Franco Doria, which served as flagship of the sailing vessels.
- The Spanish armada captained by Bazán the Elder, with 15 galleys and many caravels, galleons, carracks and troop carriers. They included 80 heavy carracks built in Málaga and 42 carracks gathered in Biscay from the Cantabrian Sea bases. Their command ship was a giant carrack from Málaga nicknamed the "Capitana", large enough to have six topsails, which was used as a hospital ship.
- The Portuguese armada, with the famed the Portuguese galleon São João Baptista, considered the most powerful ship in the world at the time, at the head of one carrack and 20 caravels. The fleet was captained by Infante Luís, Charles V's brother-in-law, with the veteran João de Castro.
- The squad of Sicilia, captained by Berenguer de Requesens, with 10 galleys. They were joined by Sicilian corsair Guglielmo Bellomo with his private galleon.
- The squad of Naples, with six galleys under García Álvarez de Toledo y Osorio.
- A fleet from the Habsburg Netherlands with 60 hulks and carracks.
- The Knights Hospitaller under Aurelio Botigela, prior de Pisa, with four galleys. The order's flagship, the famed, ironclad carrack Santa Anna, arrived separately on June 17 as part of Sicilian reinforcements.
- The Papal fleet with 12 galleys under Virginio Orsini, Count of Anguillara.
- The Princedom of Monaco with two galleys.

=== Ottoman army ===
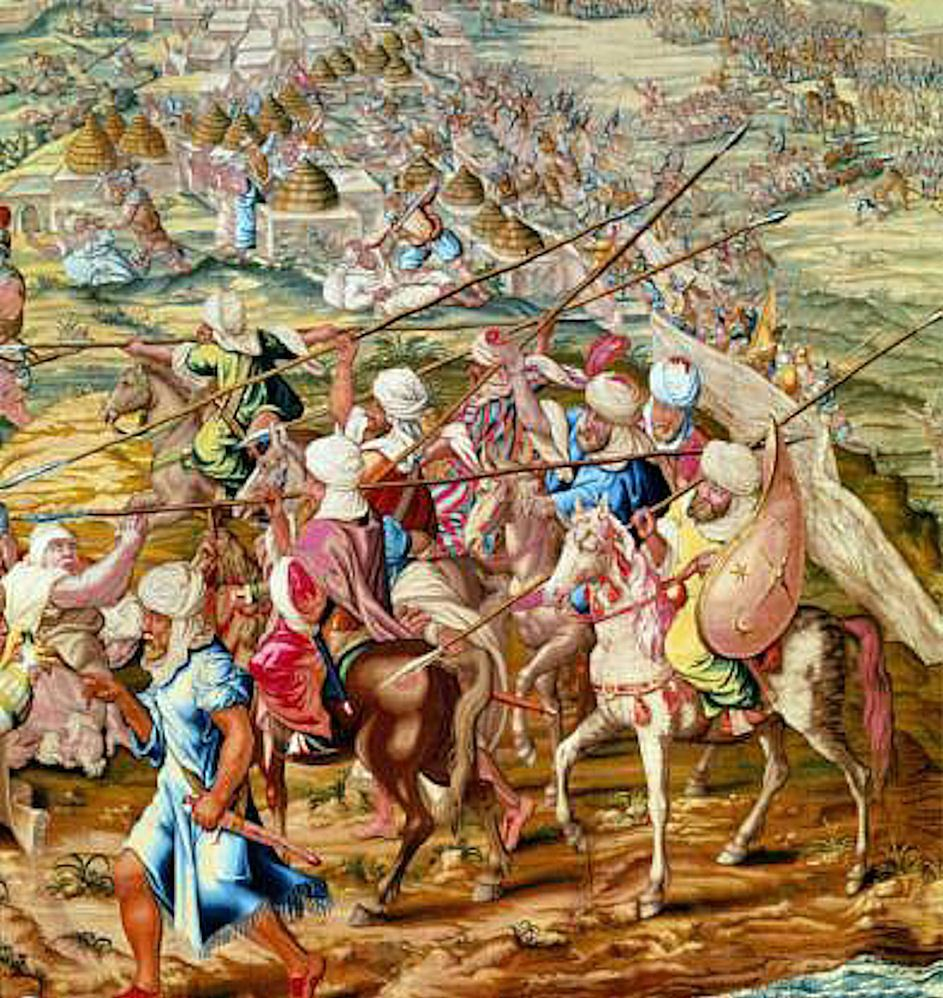
Ottoman troops in the conquest of Tunis, 1535.

Barbarossa had prepared Tunis for the battle, putting 9,000 Christian slaves and masses of local Moors to build fortifications around the city of Tunis and the coastal fortress of La Goulette. Christian sources have him pondering about putting his fleet to the sea, hoping to either defeat the Imperial armada or at least escape, but ultimately deciding to seek to defend from land, unconvinced of the Tunisians' loyalty should he move his troops out of the city. He left most of his fleet, composed of over 100 galleys and fustas, safely locked in the lake of Tunis, behind La Goulette, bringing to land most of the ships' gun to mount them in the fortifications. He left outside only fifteen armed galleys. He called reinforcements from Algiers, Djerba, Tlemcen, Alexandria and Constantinople, and hired mercenaries from all the Barbary.

His lieutenants included Hasan Agha, Sinan Reis, Salih Reis and Aydin "Caccidiablo". His Janissaries were commanded by Jaffar Aga, while his renegados or foreign converts were led by Mustapha Cordobes, who was experienced in Spanish military tactics. Christian sources record as elite troops 8,000 Turks, 800 of them Janissaries, and Tunisian locals divided in 7,000 lancers, 8,000 archers equipped with poisoned arrows, and 8,000 horsemen described as using similar gear and tactics to those of the ancient Numidian cavalry. His army was large enough that according to the same sources, even with the constant casualties, it reached 100,000 footsoldiers and 30,000 horsemen between regulars and militiamen. These numbers are probably exaggerated, although it was still an army of a fearsome size. His combatants were also led by marabouts and local holy women to rouse their religious fervor, assuring them they were protected from enemy bullets and cannonballs, and promising them rewards in afterlife. He also recruited wives of soldiers as additional combatants.

== The conquest ==
The armada sailed from Sardinia on June 14 in ordered formation. The Portuguese division was at the head of the convoy, followed by the emperor and Doria commanding from most of the ships in the middle, and Bazán the Elder covering the rear guard with the Spanish galleys. They sighted Africa the same day, landing in Porto Farina, between Bizerte and the ruins of Carthage. After sending part of the Biscayan ships to reinforce Melilla, which was found out to be harassed by corsairs, the rest of the fleet then surprised and captured two French ships, which returned from informing Barbarossa about the invasion.

The expedition finished disembarking on June 17 and planted its camp near the ruins, repulsing the first enemies and securing the nearby wells. The emperor then had engineer Benedetto da Ravenna fortify them. Barbarossa received then the first news about the true size of Charles V's armada; upon realizing Luigi de Presendes had fooled him, he had the spy beheaded. Afterwards he called his forces to be alert and imprisoned his 20,000 Christian slaves in the Tunis kasbah to prevent revolts, having pondered about executing them. His only strategy was to try to delay the invading army for enough time for it to run out of supplies and be weakened by plagues, hunger and Tunisia's scorching heat. Before the lake of Tunis could be blocked, he pulled fourteen galleys to send to Bona and twelve to Algiers.

=== Capture of La Goulette ===
The Ottomans sent skirmishers against the Catholic camp since June 17, being repulsed with high casualties, as Charles had ordered everybody to remain until the surrounding terrain had been scouted. His first goal was to conquer La Goulette, where Barbarossa had posted 5,000 soldiers, focused most of the artillery and surrounded with walks and trenches. He had also built a wooden bridge over the channel for better mobility. Juan Manrique de Lara probed the local artillery by exposing his galley to the enemy fire before withdrawing. Bazán the Elder inspected it from close thanks to a ruse, rushing to the port pursued by his own fleet as if his galley had been overpowered by a slave revolt, making the Ottomans give him passage. Only after he dropped his disguise, firing his own guns on them before fleeing.

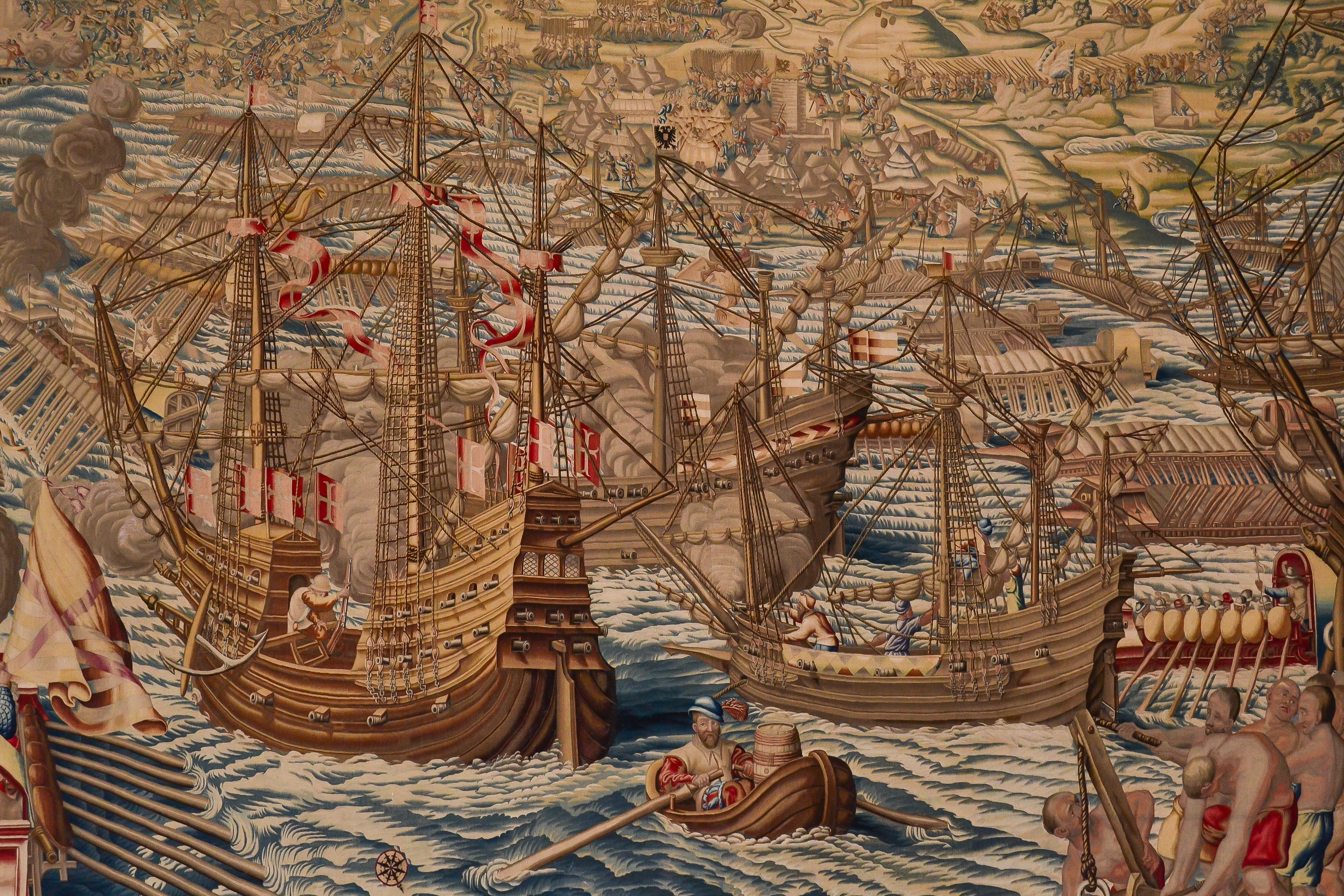
The armada firing against La Goulette.

The Catholics besieged La Goulette before the following morning. A boom had been tended by Turks across the galley to prevent enemy ships from approaching so the great São João Baptista was summoned to break it. The first attempt was unsuccessful, but during the second Dom Luís instructed the pilot to move back and run again with greater moment, which managed to break the boom. Afterwards, the São João was towed by two galleys to bring it as close as possible to land, and started firing its 140 guns to cover the land forces.

Charles fought personally in the next skirmishes, helping defeat a series of Ottoman attacks that heavily outnumbered his companies. The Muslims attacked with infantry, cavalry and camel cavalry, which scared away the western horses, unaccustomed to their smell. The fortress' garrison, led by Sinan and Caccidiablo, offered great resistance, to the extent of capturing two flags of the Spanish and Italian companies during the assaults.

The next days the Portuguese flotilla bombarded La Goulette, after which its ships were anchored forming a blockade so no enemy ship could enter of leave. Next day the Ottomans launched an incursion, reaching deep into two Italian companies, but they were fought off. In one of the following sorties, Tutavilla was overwhelmed and killed, with his head and hand being sent to Barbarossa, before Doria could cover his company with another naval bombardment from his galleys and galleons. On day 24 the Ottomans attacked again the Catholic lines, inflicting casualties, but being repulsed again. Despite the continuous fights, the Christians tightened the siege day after day, digging trenches increasingly closer to the fortress. Later, the 74 year old veteran Hernando de Alarcón came from Italy with several volunteering noblemen and 40 Albanian stratioti.

On day 26, judging the fortress close to fall, Barbarossa ordered a two-pronged attack from La Goulette and Tunis against the Catholic positions, carrying discreetly light artillery pieces from a forested passage and in skiffs through the lake. The Christian resisted the attack, and the emperor ordered then the Marquis of Mondéjar to go with 8,500 men to capture the enemy artillery, which he accomplished with some effort, causing large casualties among a number of enemies which "looked to be infinite" according to the chronicles. The Ottoman looked to advance from the lake's shores, but Charles personally pushed them back at the head of reinforcements. Victory was sound enough that a Tunisian baker contacted the emperor claiming to be able to poison Barbarossa for him, which Charles refused on moral principle.

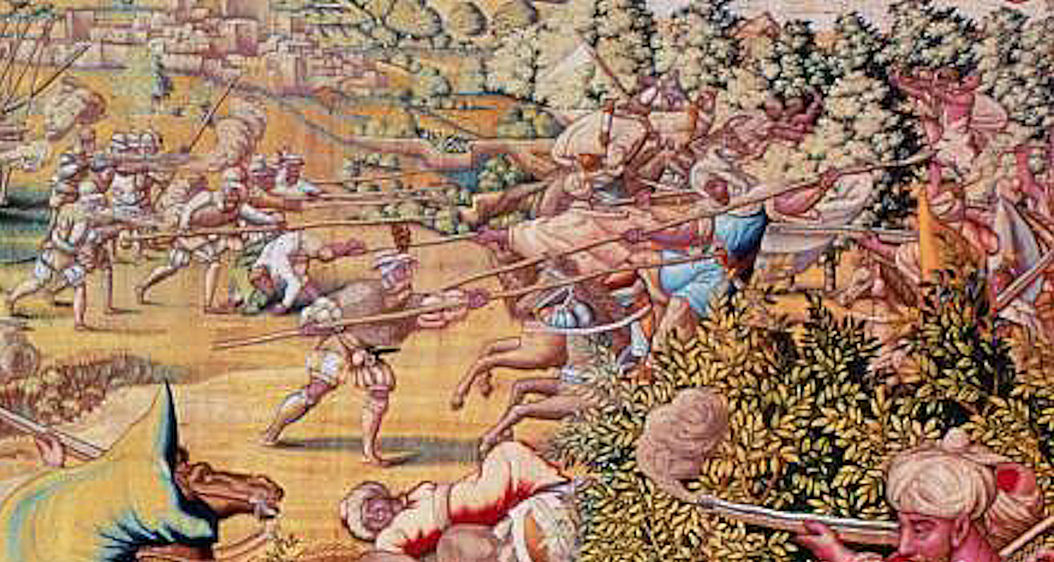
Terrestrial assault on La Goulette.

Two days later a storm hit the Tunisian coast, devastating the Catholic camp and endangering the fleet. Chaos spread among the ranks, with rumors claiming it to be the devil's intervention, but Andrea Doria capitalized the confusion to spread the rumor that La Goulette had just been taken, rising again the morale until the storm passed. When the Ottomans capitalized on the chance to attack, they found the Catholics ready to fight them off, with Jaffer Aga being killed in action. On day 29, Muley Hasan arrived to assist in the recapture of his former domain, with the emperor receiving him despite suffering a gout attack. Charles had also been freeing Tunisian prisoners to show his benevolence and inform the rest that he was attempting to free them from the Ottoman yoke, even although many refused to fight for Christians against other Muslims.

On July 4, learning many Catholics had come out to forage, the Turks launched a massive attack again, repulsing them to the gates of La Goulette, where the local garrison was barely able to defend. The attack saw the participation of Bazán the Elder, who was grazed in the nose by an arquebus bullet, and Rodrigo de Ripalda, who was hit in the head by another bullet yet improbably survived. Barbarossa ordered Sinan Reis to destroy the bridge over the channel, hoping to motivate his men to fight harder by leaving them with less means to retreat, but Sinan refused. Shortly after, the Catholic camp received three deserting Ottoman converts, two of them being reportedly teenage lovers of Barbarossa and the third being one of his backers, all of them bringing stashes of money.

After defeating personally another assault, Charles ordered to prepare the final assault to La Goulette for day 11, which was postponed to July 14 due to unfavorable weather. On July 12, facing growing danger, Barbarossa sent the French ambassador in Tunis to Constantinople with a flotilla captained by Alexandrian corsair Hassan the Moor.

The chosen day, Andrea Doria directed a massive naval bombardment with the gallies and the heaviest armed sailing ships, with Ávalos and Infante Luis directing personally their artillerymen. The attack was led by the São João Baptista, the Santa Anna and Franco Doria's galleon, whose artillery outranged that of La Goulette and allowed them to hit without being answered. The galleys were instructed by Doria to perform a pattern similar to volley fire in groups of eight, advancing to fire and then rowing back to reload without becoming a target. The bombardment was so overwhelming that after two hours, part of La Goulette collapsed. Charles ordered the final attack, and Bazán the Elder headed the assault with marine infantry through the breaches, preceding the rest of the camp. La Goulette was finally taken, with 4,000 Ottomans being killed inside, while Sinan and few others managed to escape through the lake by skiffs.

The allies seized 300-500 cannons, many of the pieces and cannonballs sporting with the French fleur-de-lis mark, evidence of the contacts stemming from the Franco-Ottoman alliance, and also captured all the ships Barbarossa had left in the lake. The number of taken vessels, according to Spanish sources, comprised 43 galleys, including Barbarossa's richly decorated flagship, along with 44 galiots, fustas and brigantines, and 86 small boats. The galleys also included the Spanish squad leader captured in the 1529 Battle of Formentera.

=== Battle of Tunis ===
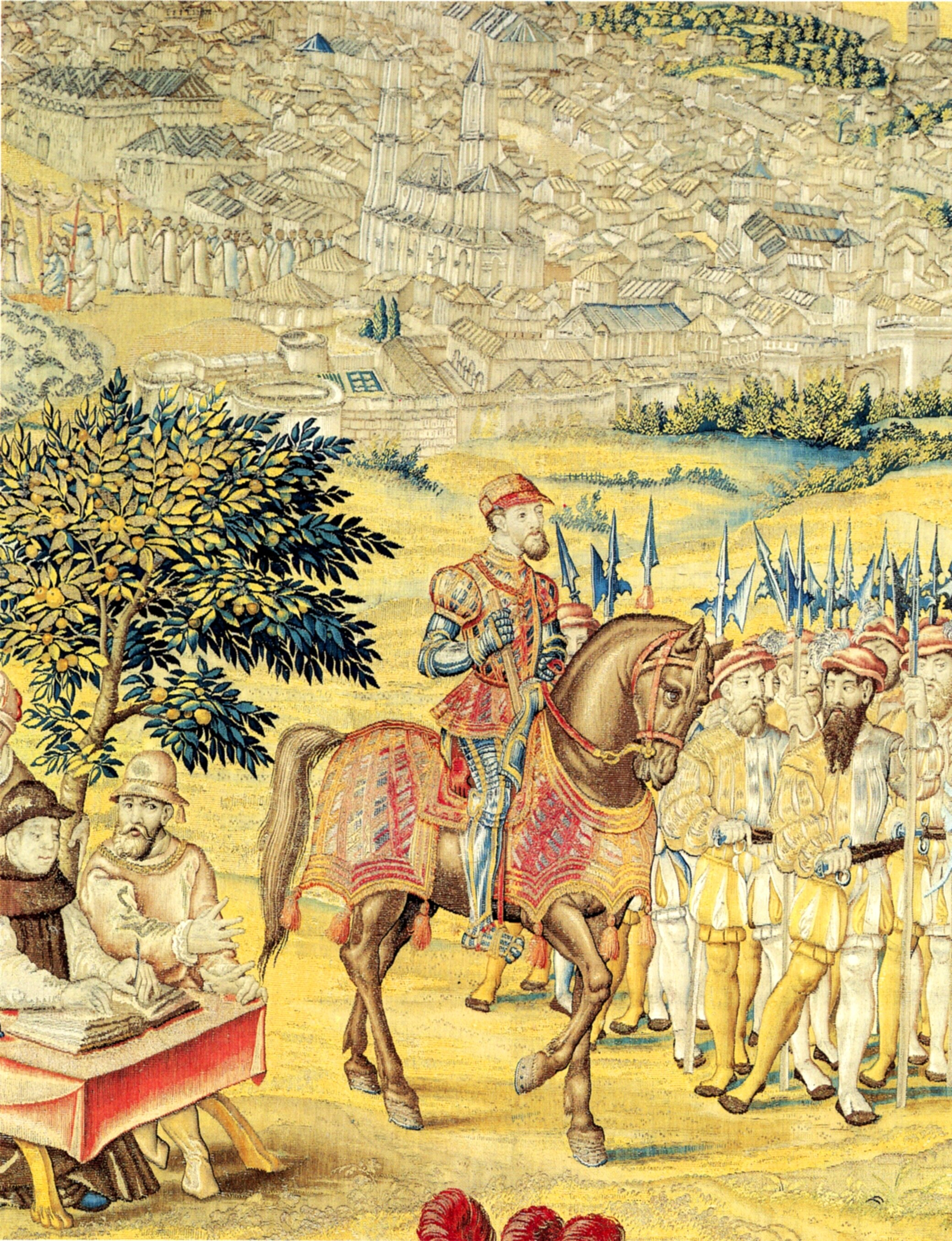
Charles V in the conquest of Tunis.

Having lost La Goulette, Barbarossa organized his last stand in Tunis, concentrating 150,000 men, executing anyone possibly partisan to Muley Hasan, and sending to Bona many treasures to save. In the Catholic camp, some lobbied to end the campaign, reasoning that the Ottoman admiral posed no more danger without his fleet and trapped in land, and that trying to take Tunis against vastly superior numbers was reckless, especially in hostile and arid land. They remembered King Louis IX of France, who died trying to conquer Tunis in 1270. However, Charles would not accept anything other than a total victory. Although he offered his authorization to anyone who wanted to return to Europe, eventually Charles, Luís and the Duke of Alba convinced the army to stay. On July 20 they initiated the march towards the city, leaving Doria in command of the camp, Bazán the Elder in charge of the fleet, and the wounded and women in La Goulette, which was being rebuilt.

The 23,000 Christians journeyed five miles to Tunis in formation. The army was headed by a cavalry squad with the emperor himself, two squads of Spanish veterans from the Italian Wars commanded by Ávalos and Fernando Sanseverino, and the artillery train dragged by Germans and sailors by lack of draft animals, with two wings of arquebusiers at both flanks of the column. Behind them Eberstein marched in wider formation, followed by the baggage train, some artillery and the entourage of Muley Hasan, flanked by cavalry led by the Marquis of Mondéjar. In the last place, another Spanish cavalry company under the Duke of Alba protected the rear guard. The journey through three leagues was tough due to the heat and the constant attacks of the Ottomans, who had to be repulsed every time. Some men died of heatstroke.

From the other side of the plan, Barbarossa marched from Tunis with a mass of 80,000-100,000 infantrymen and 25,000 horsemen, among them 6,000 Janissaries and converts and 13,000 Moor arquebusiers, with much artillery. He supplied them with huge water reserves carried by camels and horses. Barbarossa intended to capitalize on the desert to wear the enemy down, ordering his men to occupy the nearby wells to deny them and, in case of having to retreat, to poison them.

The two armies met on July 21. The emperor ordered to form, with the Italians at the right close to the lake's shore, the artillery arranged in the middle and the Spanish veterans at the right. As the sheer size of the enemy forces intimidated many Christians, Manrique de Lara maintained discipline by proclaiming "the more Moors, the more gains" (a más moros, más ganancia). Meanwhile, Barbarossa formed with part of his cavalry close to the shore at the right, the Janissaries and converts at left facing the Spaniards, and the rest of his forces in the middle, hoping to flank his opponents with the rest of his cavalry. Noting advantages of the opposing force and the exhaustion of his own, Charles asked Alarcón for advice, being the most experienced land soldier; Alarcón called attack without fail. Therefore, after a rousing speech, running on horse in front of his ranks, Charles returned to his position with the standardbearers behind the vanguard and ordered to close on the enemy.

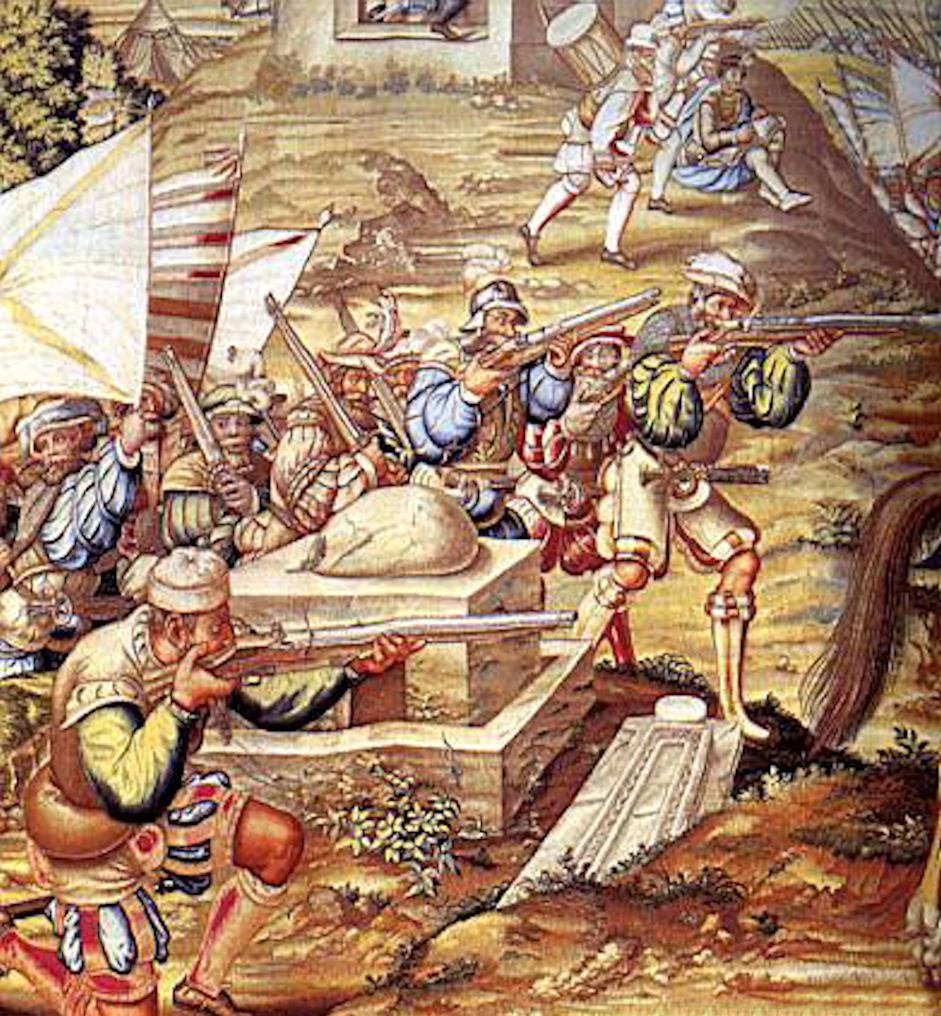
Imperial troops in the conquest of Tunis. 1535, Jan Cornelisz Vermeyen.

The battle started with an artillery exchange. Barbarossa's guns to the left disrupted the Italians, and the Germans behind them, so Ávalos reinforced them with some companies of Spaniards from the back. In turn, the Catholic artillery had a fulminant effect on the Ottomans' cramped mass, inflicting so many casualties that Barbarossa changed his mind and ordered to charge with all of their forces, calling the flanking cavalry from their hideout. The attack failed, as his ranks collapsed upon colliding with the sturdier landsknechts and tercios, while his flanking attempt was broken by the Duke of Alba and his arquebusiers. The battle ended shortly after, with the Ottoman army routing with enormous losses, some of them scattering and others withdrawing back to Tunis, helped by many of the Catholics preferring to seize the wells rather than pursue their enemies.

Barbarossa reached Tunis, where he gathered the 12,000 soldiers who remained available. He intended to execute the Christian slaves to prevent them from revolting at the closeness of the Imperial army. Although Sinan Reis convinced him to spare them, arguing the captives belonged to the Sultan, the discussion was heard by two converts of Spanish origin, Francisco de Medellín and Vicente de Cataro, who immediately deserted and organized a slave rebellion with 6,000 of them. While the revoltees seized weapons and took over the kasbah, Barbarossa negotiated with them, offering them freedom and money if they fought for him, but they refused, and he was forced to leave the city to avoid the uprising. According to Christian chronicles, on the way to Bona his entourage was assaulted by some of his own mercenaries, who stole part of his treasure, and he lost women and children from his harem in the process. Aydin Reis had been wounded in the battle and died before they could reach the harbor.

=== Fall of the city ===
Charles entered Tunis on July 21, with the revoltees handing him the kasbah's keys. After conceding Muley Hasan two hours of grace, he allowed his men to sack the city, which they capitalized on to vent out their past hardships on people who had supported the Ottomans. They killed over 10,000 civilians in the 80,000 people city, possibly as much as 30,000, forcing the emperor to forbid any more killings in the course of the sack before the act went completely out of control. He retrieved all the French prisoners and sent them back to France, and allowed Muley Hasan to take and rescue all he wanted, which the Tunisian chieftain took great advantage of. There was not much booty to make in the city, so 10,000-20,000 citizens were enslaved, although many were either rescued or sold still in Africa.

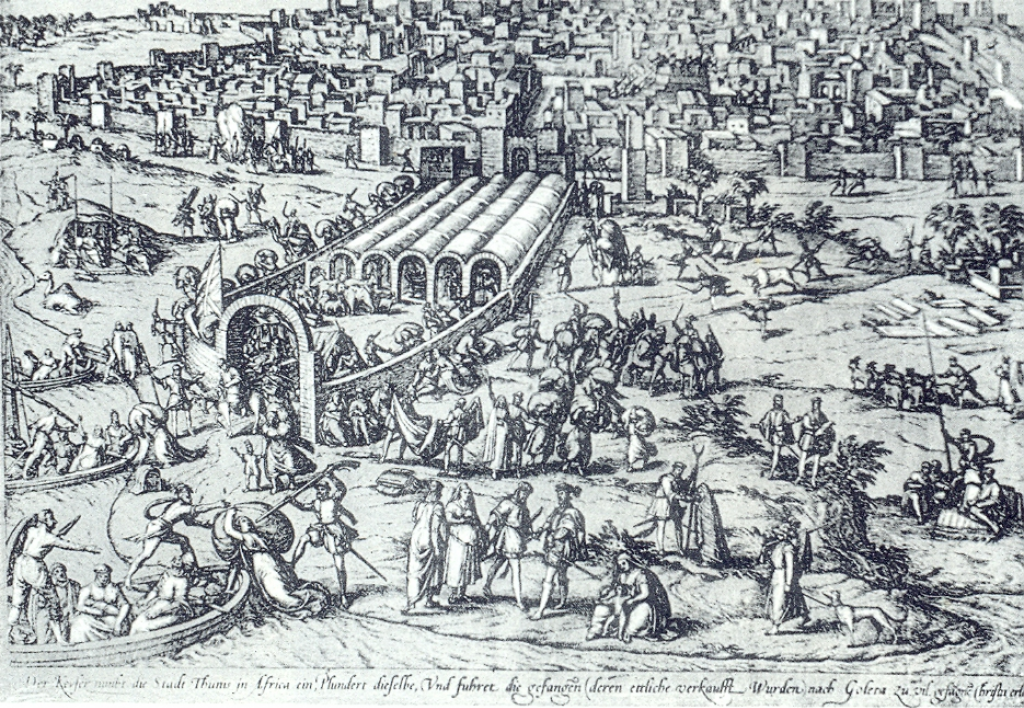
Charles V entering Tunis.

Muley Hasan was restored to his throne, signing a treatise restoring Tunis' vassalage to Spain. Charles proclaimed to him, "I won this kingdom by shedding the blood of my people, you will have to keep it by earning the heart of your subjects; do not forget the benefit you have received, and strive to forget the wrongs they did to you." The stench of the corpses was such that Charles V soon left Tunis and moved his camp to Radès. He ordered engineer Antonio Ferramolino to rebuild La Goulette, where he left a garrison under Bernardino de Mendoza. The siege demonstrated the power of the Habsburg dynasties at the time; Charles V had under his control much of southern Italy, Sicily, Spain, the Americas, Austria, the Netherlands, and lands in Germany. Furthermore, he was Holy Roman Emperor and had de jure control over much of Germany as well.

Doria ordered his relatives Giannettino Doria and Adamo Centurione to chase Barbarossa to Bona with fifteen galleys. However, upon arriving in Bône and finding it well entrenched, with Barbarossa captaining his own fifteen galleys, they decided to return. Doria eventually moved to Bona with forty galleys, but by then Barbarossa had already escaped to his other naval base in Algiers. Charles V wished to extend the campaign to Algiers and conquer it too, but the end of the summer and the approaching autumn sea weather prevented it. Barbarossa meanwhile sailed to accomplish the Sack of Mahón, where he took 600 slaves and brought them to Algiers.

== Aftermath ==
Charles V celebrated a neo-classical triumph "over the infidel" first in Sicily and then at Rome on 5 April 1536 in commemoration of his victory at Tunis. The Spanish governor of La Goulette, Luis Pérez de Vargas, fortified the island of Chikly in the lake of Tunis to strengthen the city's defences between 1546 and 1550.

Ottoman defeat in Tunis motivated them to enter into a formal alliance with France against the Habsburg Empire. Ambassador Jean de La Forêt was sent to Constantinople, and for the first time was able to become permanent ambassador at the Ottoman court and to negotiate treaties.

The Ottomans recaptured the city in 1569. Spain captured it again in 1573 under John of Austria, only to lose it again in 1574. Thereafter privateers from Tunis caused discord against Christian shipping. Tunis was raided by Spain multiple times over the years, in 1609, 1612, 1615 and 1617, but never reconquered. Raiding in the Mediterranean Sea continued until the suppression of the Barbary pirates in the early 19th century.

A French invasion led to the establishment of French Algeria in 1830, consequently France would create a protectorate over Tunisia in 1881.

== Gallery ==
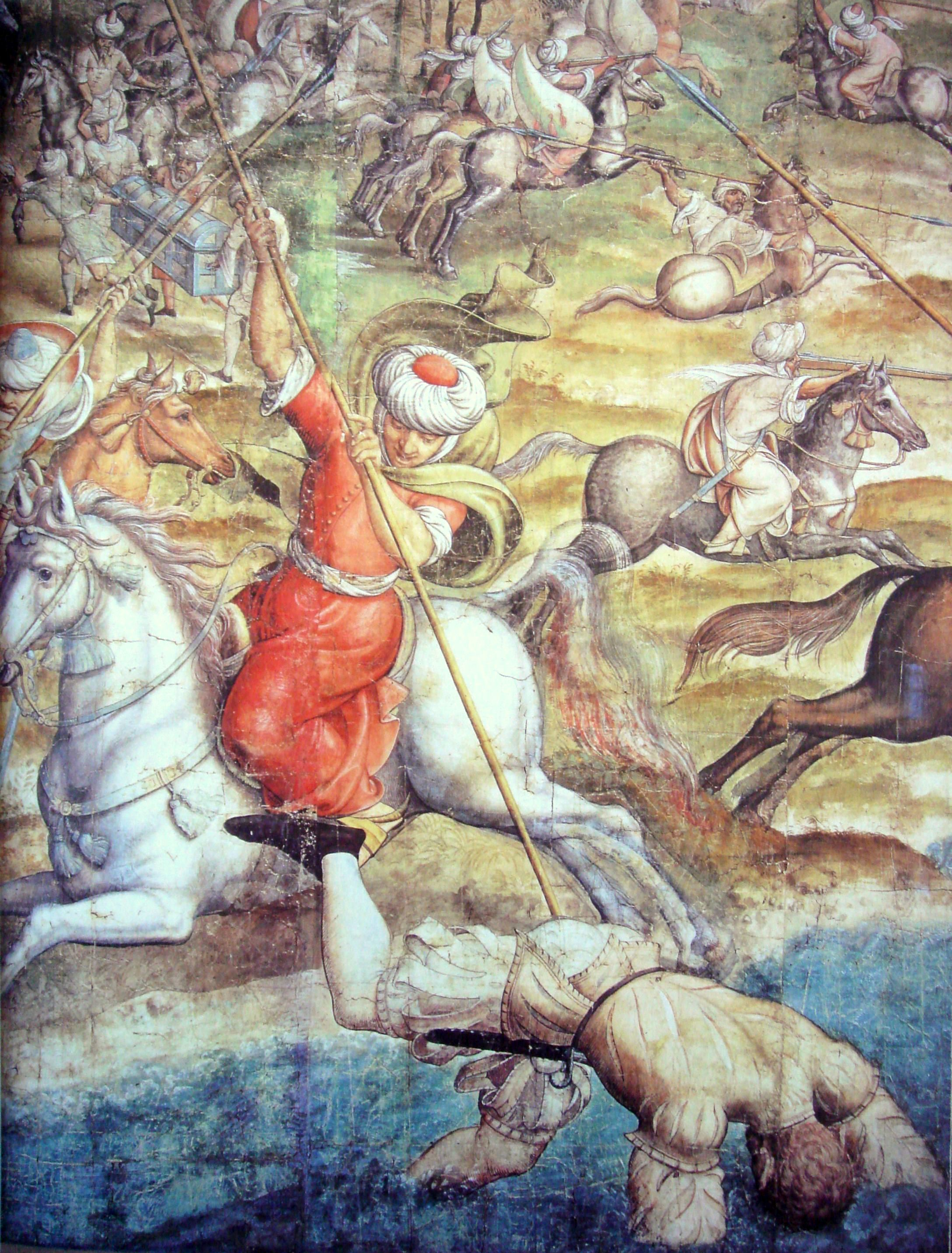
Battle scene at Tunis, 1535

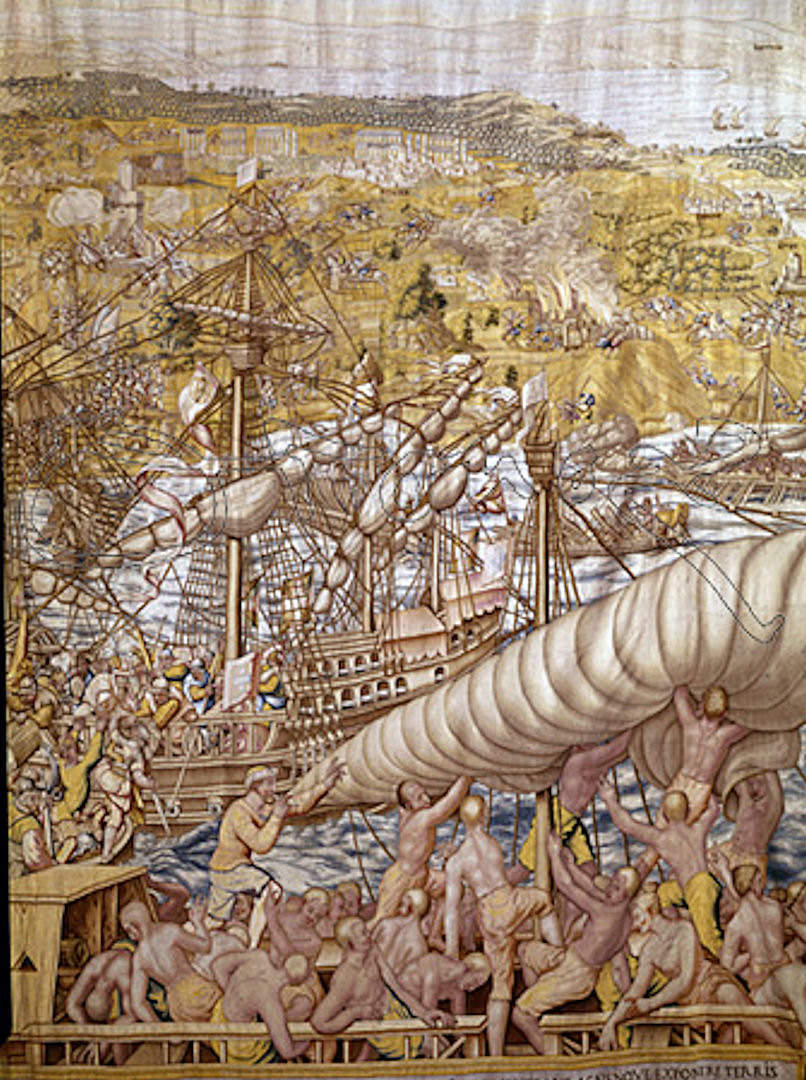
Liberation of 20,000 Christian captives

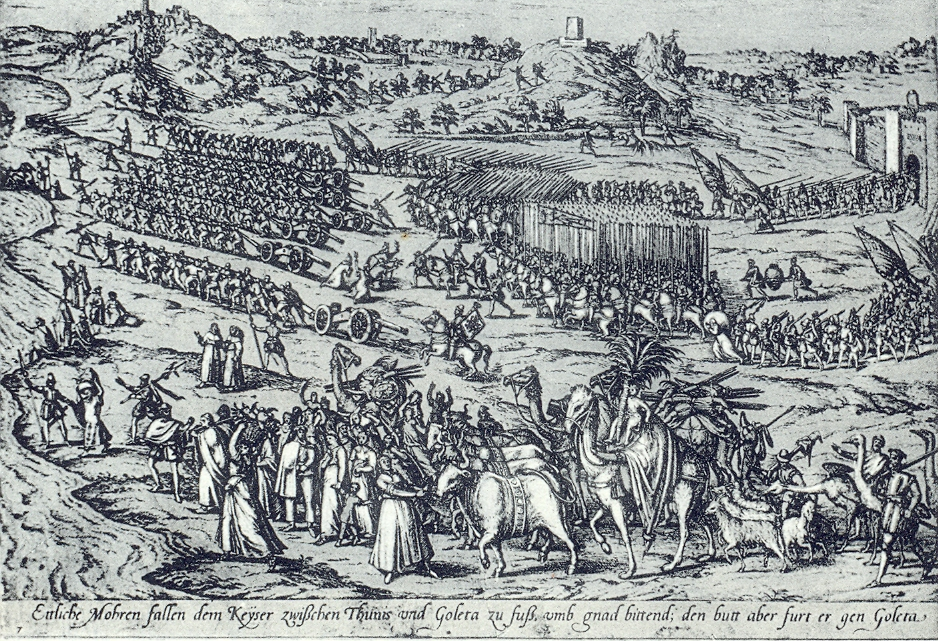
Charles V going to Radès

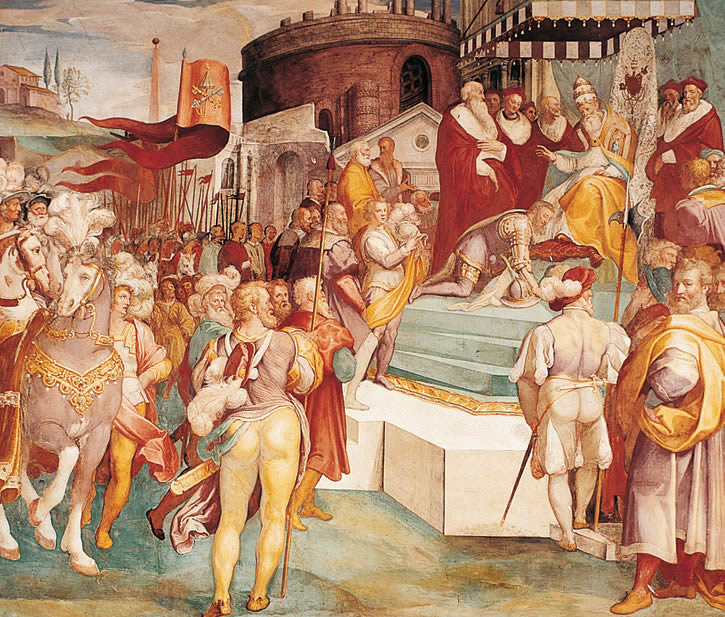
Charles V announcing the capture of Tunis to Pope Paul III in 1535

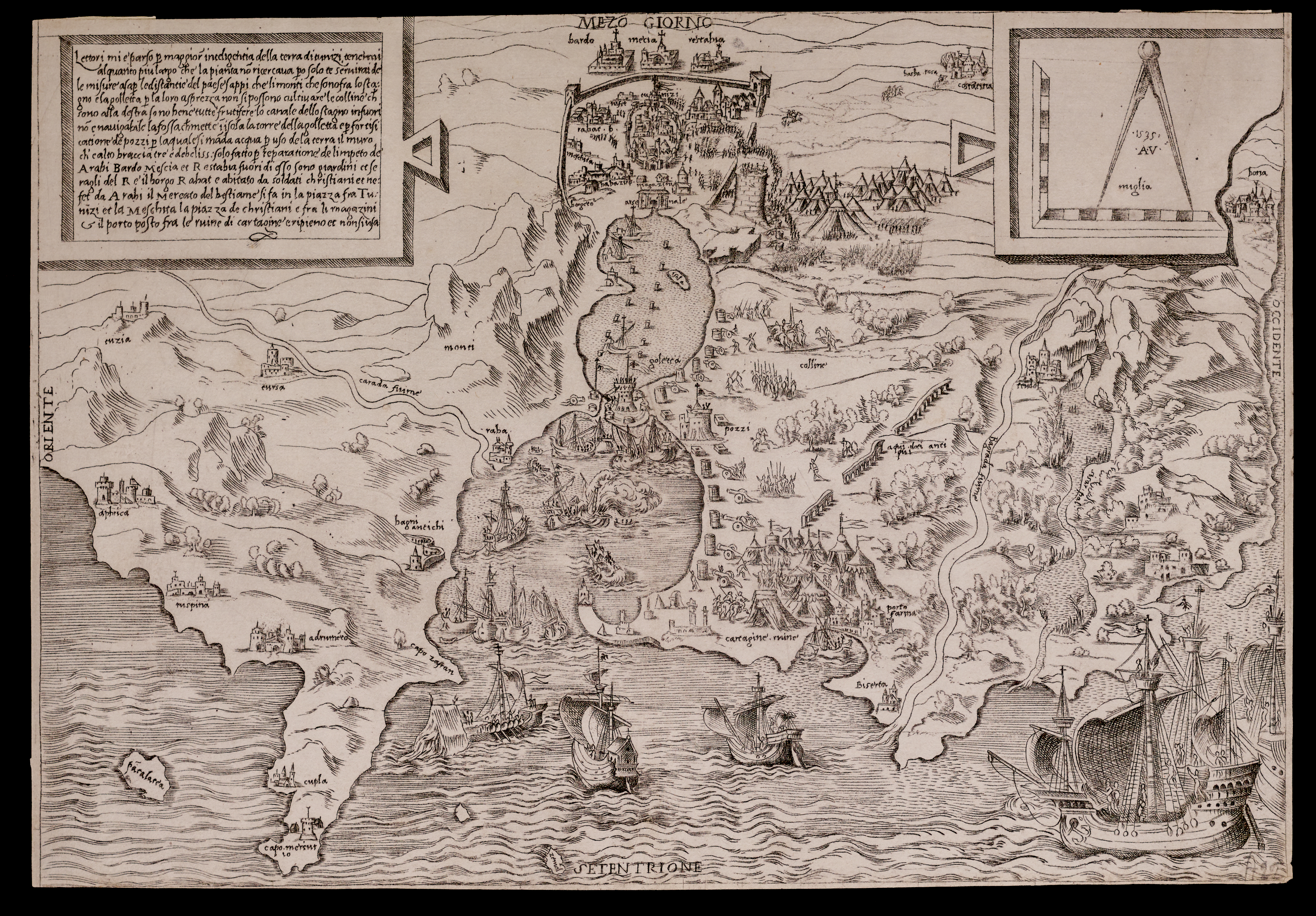
Holy Roman Emperor Charles V capturing Tunis and its port city of La Goulette (also known as Goletta and Halq al-Wadi), 1535

== See also ==
- Conquest of Coron
- Algiers expedition (1541)
- Battle of Lepanto
- Battle of Cape Celidonia
- Ottoman–Portuguese conflicts
