= Jean de Vandenesse =

Jean de Vandenesse (b. 1497) was a Burgundian writer and courtier. He was official chronicler for the courts of Holy Roman Emperor Charles V and Philip II of Spain.

== Biography ==
He was born in Vandenesse, in the County of Burgundy. He was the son of Jean de Vandenesse, sommelier for Philip the Handsome, and following his example, he became retainer of Prince Charles, son of Philip and lord of the Habsburg Netherlands. When Charles became King of Spain in 1516, he stayed in his job and was ennobled in 1524 along with his brothers Guillaume and Maximilian. From 1514 onwards, he kept a diary of the emperor's travels, accompanying him in every occasion, including events like the Conquest of Tunis and the Diet of Augsburg. From 1514 to 1532 he was also the emperor's steward.

In 1545 he became lord of Gray. Shortly after, in 1551, Charles V ordered Vandenesse to finish his chronicle about him and start the chronicle of Prince Philip, whom Vandenesse followed to Spain with the same titles and privileges. He finished this second chronicle on June 6, 1560, after turning 63 and leave his functions to retire. He retired to his native city, where he died an advanced age. His son Jacques of Vandenesse would participate in the Eighty Years' War.

== Bibliography ==
- Francisco Elías de Tejada, El Franco-Condado hispánico, 1975, Organización de Jusnaturalistas Hispánicos Felipe II, ISBN 9788485015283
- Louis-Prosper Gachard, Collection des voyages des souverains des Pays-Bas, vol. II, Journal des voyages de Charles Quint, de 1514 à 1551, par Jean de Vandenesse, 1874, pp. 53–464
- Louis-Prosper Gachard en Charles Piot, Collection des voyages des souverains des Pays-Bas, vol. IV, Journal des voyages de Philippe II, de 1554 à 1569, de Jean de Vandenesse, 1882, pp. 3–82
