= Francisco de Sarmiento =

Spanish commanding officer

Francisco de Sarmiento (1498 – August 7, 1539) was a Spanish commanding officer best known for his role in the siege of Castelnuovo, where he was killed by the Ottomans. At this battle, Sarmiento offered a fierce resistance, inflicting heavy losses on the Ottomans, who outnumbered his troops by far.

== Biography ==
=== Early life ===
It is said he was a native of Burgos, and to have descended from infant Don Juan Manuel, son of the Castilian and King Fernando III. He was the uncle of Francisco Sarmiento Mendoza.

It is said that he forged himself in the Italian Wars, fighting in Naples, Caserta, and Benevento.

=== Siege of Castelnuovo ===
At the siege of Castelnuovo, Sarmiento fought 50,000 Ottomans with about three thousand men. He chose to keep on fighting against the Ottomans till the end, refusing to make pacts with them, even though they outnumbered them by far and he knew the Holy League could not come to their help. In the last and definitive attack, Francisco de Sarmiento, on horseback, was wounded in the face by three arrows, but he continued to encourage his men.

He inflicted heavy losses on the Ottomans, killing all of the Janissaries and many from the other Ottoman units. Something between 10,000 and 20,000 Ottomans were killed by the Spaniards in what resulted in an Ottoman Pyrrhic victory.

In the last clash, Sarmiento ordered the 600 Spanish survivors to retreat and go defend the castle where the civilian population of Castelnuovo had taken refuge. Although the withdrawal was made in perfect order and discipline, Sarmiento and his men found that the doors of the castle were walled at their arrival. Sarmiento was offered a rope to raise him to the walls, but he refused to save himself and let his companions die. Thus, he joined Machín de Munguía, Juan Vizcaíno, and Sancho Frias to lead the last stand. Surrounded by the Ottoman army, the last Spanish soldiers fiercely fought until their death. Castelnuovo was lost to the Ottomans, who suffered huge casualties.

== Bibliography ==
- Arsenal, León; Prado, Fernando (2008). Rincones de historia española (in Spanish). EDAF. ISBN 978-84-414-2050-2.
- Croce, Benedetto (2007). España en la vida italiana del Renacimiento (in Spanish). Editorial Renacimiento. ISBN 978-84-8472-268-7.
- Fernández Álvarez, Manuel (2001). El Imperio de Carlos V (in Spanish). Taravilla: Real Academia de la Historia. ISBN 978-84-89512-90-0.
- Fernández Álvarez, Manuel (1999). Carlos V, el César y el hombre (in Spanish). Espasa-Calpe. ISBN 84-239-9752-9.
- Fernández Duro, Cesáreo (1895). Armada Española desde la unión de los reinos de Castilla y Aragón (in Spanish). Vol. I. Madrid, Spain: Est. tipográfico "Sucesores de Rivadeneyra".
- Jacob Levin, Michael (2005). Agents of empire: Spanish ambassadors in sixteenth-century Italy. New York: Cornell University Press. ISBN 978-0-8014-4352-7.
- Jaques, Tony (2007). Dictionary of Battles and Sieges: A Guide to 8,500 Battles from Antiquity Through the Twenty-first Century. Vol. 2. Greenwood Publishing Group. ISBN 978-0-313-33538-9.
- Martínez Laínez, Fernando; Sánchez de Toca Catalá; José María (2006). Tercios de España: la infantería legendaria (in Spanish). Madrid: EDAF. ISBN 978-84-414-1847-9.
- Martínez Ruiz, Enrique; Giménez, Enrique (1994). Introducción a la historia moderna (in Spanish). Ediciones Akal. ISBN 978-84-7090-293-2.
- De Sandoval, Prudencio (1634). Historia de la vida y hechos del emperador Carlos V (in Spanish). Bartolomé París (Pamplona), Pedro Escuer (Zaragoza).
