= Martín García Cereceda =

Spanish soldier and chronicler

Martín García Cereceda or Cerezeda (fl. 1521-1545) was a Spanish soldier and chronicler. He served twenty three years in the armies of Holy Roman Emperor Charles V, which he covered in his chronicle. It was published by Ariba in 1873.

== Biography ==
Born in Cordova, he pursued military life, which he described as, "with spirited and merry will I left my land, and coming to the road I felt like tasting the danger that an infinite number of knights, nobles and soldiers have tasted". In 1521 he became an aquebusier and up to 1545 was part of the Spanish army, first of the coronelías and later of the tercios, participating in a long number of campaigns. Among them, he served in the Battle of Pavia in 1525, where he was part of Francisco de Villaturiel's company. He was also present during the death of celebrated poet Garcilaso de la Vega during the siege of Nice of 1536.

After his retirement in 1545, he wrote his work, Tratado de las campañas y otros acontecimientos del emperador Carlos V desde 1521 a 1545, por Martín García Cereceda, cordovés, soldado de aquellos ejércitos, which he dedicated to Gonzalo Fernández de Córdoba, grandson of the Great Captain. The work, which places him in the tradition of the Spanish soldier-writer, remained unpublished to the 19th century, when it was published by Ariba in 1873. It is considered a fairly neutral and thorough chronicle.
