= Holy League (1538) =

Short-lived alliance of Christian states

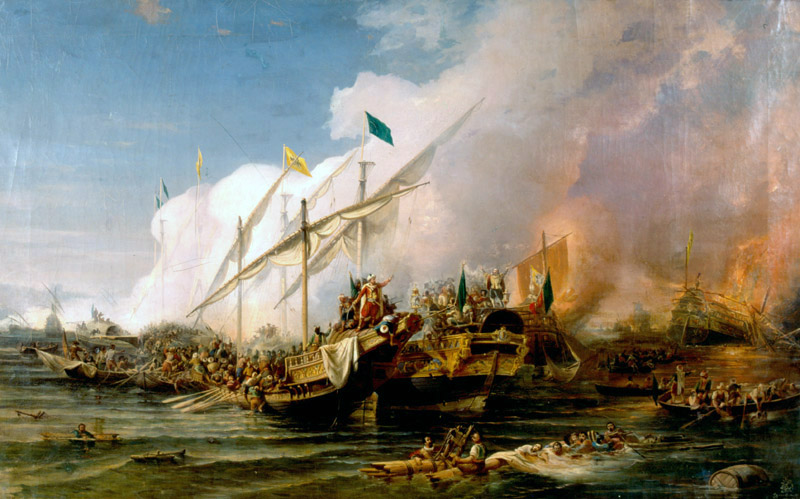
The Holy League is defeated by the Barbarossa Hayreddin Pasha

The Holy League of 1538 was a short-lived alliance of Christian states arranged by Pope Paul III at the urging of the Republic of Venice.

In 1537 the Ottoman admiral Hayreddin Barbarossa, had captured the Venetian stronghold of Corfu and ravaged the coasts of Calabria. In the face of this threat Pope Paul succeeded in February 1538 in organizing the Holy League which consisted of the Papal States, the Republic of Venice, the Maltese Knights, the Spains and the Spanish ruled Naples and Sicily.

To confront Barbarossa and his roughly 120 galleys and fustas, the League assembled a fleet of 302 ships (162 galleys and 140 sailing ships) in September 1538 near Corfu. Its supreme commander was the Genoese admiral Andrea Doria, who was then in the service of Emperor Charles V.

The two fleets met on 28 September 1538 in the Battle of Preveza, and Barbarossa decisively defeated the numerically superior Christian alliance. Doria's leadership in the battle was less than vigorous and is widely believed to have been a major contributing cause to the League's defeat. His hesitation to bring his own ships into full action (he personally owned a number of them) and to sacrifice them for the good of Venice, the traditional rival of his home town of Genoa, are generally considered to explain his actions at Preveza.

== See also ==
- Ottoman–Venetian War (1537–1540)
- Siege of Castelnuovo

== Literature ==
- Wolf, John B., "The Barbary Coast: Algeria under the Turks," W. W. Norton, 1979; ISBN 978-0-393-01205-7
- Cook, M.A. (ed.), "A History of the Ottoman Empire to 1730," Cambridge University Press, 1976; ISBN 978-0-521-20891-8
- Currey, E. Hamilton, "Sea-Wolves of the Mediterranean," John Murrey, 1910.
- Norwich, John Julius, "A History of Venice," Vintage, 1982; ISBN 0-679-72197-5 (pbk.)
