= Admiral Doria =

Admiral Doria may refer to:

- Andrea Doria (1466–1560), Genoese admiral
- Antonio Doria (died 1346), Admiral of France
- Filippino Doria (fl. 1510s–1540s), Genoese admiral
- Antonio Doria (1495-1577), Genoese admiral
- Giovanni Andrea Doria (1539–1606), Italian admiral
- Lamba Doria (1245–1323), Genoese admiral
- Oberto Doria (died 1306), Genoese admiral
- Paganino Doria (fl. 1350s), Genoese admiral
- Simone Doria (admiral) (born c. 1135), Genoese admiral
