= Raid on Cherchell (1531) =

Raid on Cherchell (1530)
- Part of Spanish–Ottoman wars
Date	July 1530
Location	Cherchell
Result	Algerian victory

Belligerents
Empire of Charles V: Spain; Genoa; France	Regency of Algiers

Commanders and leaders
Andrea Doria	Ali Caramani

Strength
1,500 men 32 galleys 8 galleons 5 brigantines 2 lateen sails 3 ships	25 galleys and galiots

Casualties and losses
400-600 killed or captured	All vessels scuttled Light casualties

The raid on Cherchell occurred in July 1530, when Genoese admiral Andrea Doria attacked the Algerian fortress of Cherchell as part of a campaign against Barbary corsairs.

== Background ==
In 1530, Ottoman privateer Hayreddin Barbarossa called Sinan Reis from Djerba and Ali Caramani from near Tunis to gather their respective fleets in Cherchell with plans to attack Cádiz, collecting 10 galleys and 60 galiots. Barbarossa send Caramani with 25 of them to supply in the neighboring port of Cherchell, controlled by the Regency of Algiers.

Meanwhile, Genoese admiral Andrea Doria sailed off Genoa with a multi-national fleet, formed by Holy Roman Emperor Charles V in a rare and tenuous alliance with King Francis I of France. Francis actually entertained treats with Ottoman Sultan Suleiman the Magnificent, and therefore with Barbarossa, but participated in the operation with 13 galleys in an attempt to prove that such alliance did not exist.

After finding out in Mallorca that Barbarossa had divided his forces between Algiers and Cherchell, Doria chose the latter as their target for being the weaker link. Some authors believe the invasion might also serve as bridgehead in North Africa. His fleet contained 32 galleys, eight galleons, five brigantines, two lateen sails, and three ships, as well as 13 French galleys.

== Battle ==
Upon sighting the Christian fleet, Caramani initially believed it to be the rest of Barbarossa's fleet, but after realizing his mistake he raised the alarm. He disembarked his galley slaves, numbering around 800, and had his own ships scuttled in the port to avoid their capture. He then imprisoned the slaves in the city, hoping to use them to negotiate, and sent messengers for relief forces.

Doria bombarded the port with his artillery and assaulted it, capturing the only two local galleys and seven fustas which remained in the port. He disembarked three companies of soldiers freshly recruited in Italy under the command of Giorgio Pallavicino, 1,500 in total, who entered the city, forced open the fortress' gates and liberated the galley slaves. The slaves immediately embarked in the imperial galleys, not wanting to waste time to return to their homelands, while the rest of the contingent sacked Cherchell. Only the citadel with Caraman on it resisted by that point.

Doria then made the signal for the army to return to the ships, but the soldiers disobeyed him and continued scattered while sacking the place, a chance the Ottomans capitalized on to attack them infantry and cavalry. Chaos ensued, with around 400-600 Christian soldiers who failed to reach the galleys being killed or captured, among them Pallavicino himself. Doria ordered to play the signal to sail off in an attempt to motivate the soldiers in land to recover the discipline or being abandoned, but when it proved useless, he gave actual orders to sail off leaving them to their fate. He also expected the arrival of the rest of Barbarossa's fleet and might have wanted to avoid being caught between two fires.

== Aftermath ==
Barbarossa's expedition to Cádiz had to be cancelled due to the loss of Caraman's fleet. The imperial raid on Cherchell was similarly considered botched due to their own rout and casualties. The liberated slaves were disembarked in Málaga shortly after. In retaliation for the attack, Barbarossa sent out 35 corsair ships to attack the coast of Genoa, capturing two ships or 22 ships depending on the source. He also executed several Christian prisoners who refused to convert to Islam, among them Martín de Vargas and Domingo de Portuondo. At the same time, Barbarossa found out other captives planned a rebellion in Algiers, which he crushed.

In 1534, Barbarossa captured Tunis, a highly strategical port in the Mediterranean, which he turned into his new home base. However, another Christian fleet commanded by Doria and Álvaro de Bazán the Elder, now with France absent due to their renewed alliance with the Ottoman Empire, conquered it two years later.

== Bibliography ==
- Concepción, Gerónimo (1690). Emporio de el orbe: Cadiz illustrada, investigacion de sus antiguas grandezas' discurrida en concurso de general imperio de Espana.
- Crespo López, Mario; Portugal García, Óscar (2013). El Imperio de Carlos V: cuatro ensayos. Reaktion. ISBN 9781861899460.
- Fernández Duro, Cesáreo (1895). Armada Espyearla, desde la unión de los reinos de Castilla y Aragón, tomo I. Sucesores de Ribadeneyra.
- Fissel, Mark (2022). The Military Revolution and Revolutions in Military Affairs. De Gruyter. ISBN 9783110657593.
- Jamieson, Alan G. (2013). Lords of the Sea: A History of the Barbary Corsairs. Reaktion. ISBN 9781861899460.
- Lane-Pool, Stanley (1890). The Barbary Corsairs. T. Fisher Unwin.
- Martinez-Pinna, Javier (2021). Eso no estaba en mi libro de historia de la piratería. Almuzara. ISBN 9788418757716.
- Merriman, Roger (1944). Suleiman the Magnificent, 1520-1566. Oxford University Press.
- Ochoa de la Salde, Juan (1585). Primera parte de la Carolea inchiridion, que trata de la vida y hechos del inuictissimo emperador don carlos Quinto de este first, y de muchas notables cosas en ella sucedidas hasta el aņo de 1555.
- Rogan, Eugene (2015). Los árabes: del imperio otomano a la actualidad. Crítica. ISBN 9788498928426.
- Sandoval, Prudencio (1614). Historia de la Vida y hechos del emperador Carlos V.
