= Battle of Ponza (1552) =

1552 Naval conflict between Genoa and the Ottoman Empire

- Part of the Ottoman-Habsburg wars and the Italian War of 1551–1559
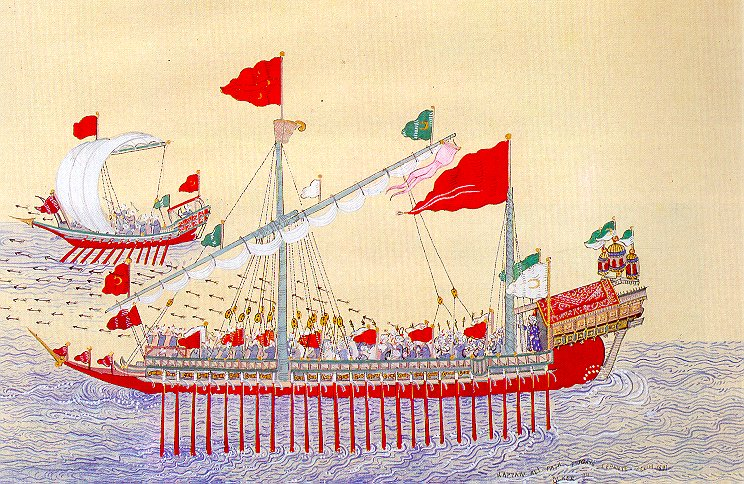
- An Ottoman galley.
Date	5 August 1552
Location	Off Ponza, present-day Italy
Result	Franco–Ottoman victory

Belligerents
Spanish Empire; Republic of Genoa	Ottoman Empire; Kingdom of France

Commanders and leaders
(Republic of Genoa) Andrea Doria (Spanish Empire) Juan de Mendoza	Dragut (Kingdom of France) Gabriel de Luetz d'Aramon

Strength
39 galleys	100 galleys (Kingdom of France) 3 galleys

Casualties and losses
7 galleys captured	Minor

The Battle of Ponza (1552) was a naval battle that occurred near the Italian island of Ponza. The battle was fought between a Franco-Ottoman fleet under Dragut and a Spanish-Genoese fleet commanded by Andrea Doria. The latter were attempting to carry troops to Naples, but were diverted and lost seven galleys captured. The battle made it easier for the Ottoman fleet to raid the coasts of Sicily, Sardinia, and Italy for the next three years.

== Opposing fleets ==
The Ottoman fleet consisted of 100 galleys which had been sent by Suleiman the Magnificent to the Western Mediterranean when Henry II entered into conflict with Charles V in the Italian War of 1551-59. The fleet was accompanied by three French galleys under the French ambassador Gabriel de Luetz d'Aramon, who accompanied the Ottomans from Istanbul in their raids along the coast of Calabria in Southern Italy, capturing the city of Reggio.

The Spanish and Genoese fleet consisted of 39 galleys under the command of Andrea Doria. Twenty of the galleys in the Genoese fleet belonged personally to Doria, six to an Antonio Doria and two to the House of Grimaldi of Monaco.

== Battle ==
Doria and Juan de Mendoza were ordered to carry supplies and troops from Ostia to Naples, where Viceroy Pedro de Toledo was defending against a seaborn Franco-Ottoman attack. Having in command 39 galleys against the 150 Ottoman and French ships operating throughout, they were to navigate as stealthily as possible and evade them. Between the islands of Ponza and Terracina, they were ambushed by Dragut hiding nearby with 100 galleys. Doria and Mendoza immediately escaped towards Sardinia while Dragut pounced on their rear guard, capturing seven of the galleys carrying troops.

== Aftermath ==
After the battle, the Franco-Ottoman fleet entered Majorca on 13 August 1552. The Ottomans resisted pressure from the French to send their fleet further west, perhaps for personal reasons of the commander or due to the continuing war with Persia. The victory gave the Ottomans better facility to attack Sicily, Sardinia, and the coasts of Italy for the next three years. After the battle, the Ottoman fleet wintered in Chios, where it was joined by the French fleet of Baron de la Garde, ready for major naval operations the following year, including the, later failed, Invasion of Corsica in 1553.

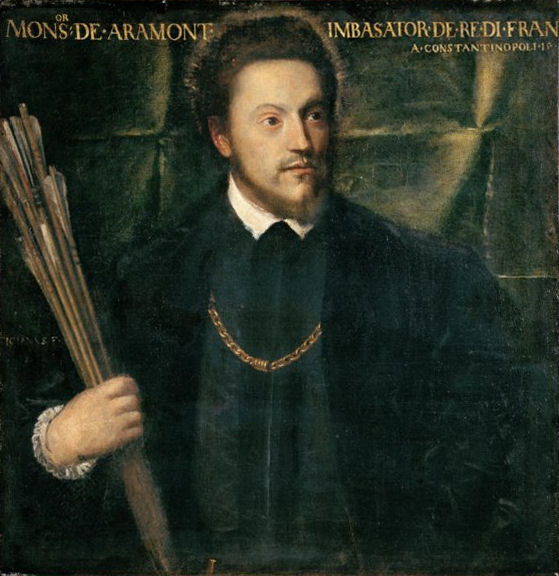
Gabriel de Luetz d'Aramon accompanied the fleet of Dragut with 3 galleys in the Battle of Ponza.

In 1560 the nephew of Doria, Giovanni Andrea Doria, led another attempt to thwart Dragut at the Battle of Djerba, but was defeated and Dragut continued his raiding of the Northern Mediterranean shores until his death five years later.

== See also ==
- Franco-Ottoman alliance
- List of Ottoman sieges and landings

== Notes ==
- Kirk, Thomas Allison (2005). Genoa and the Sea: Policy and Power in an Early Modern Maritime Republic, 1559–1684. JHU Press. p. 41. ISBN 9780801880834.
- Fernández Duro, Cesáreo (1895). Armada Española desde la unión de los reinos de Castilla y Aragón. I. Instituto de Historia y Cultura Naval.
- Konstam, Angus (2008). Piracy: The Complete History. Osprey. p. 87. ISBN 9781846032400. Archived from the original on 3 January 2014.
- Whitehouse, Rosie (2013). Bradt Liguria: The Italian Riviera. Bradt Travel Guides. p. 91. ISBN 9781841624730.
