= Battle of Antipaxos =

1537 Christian naval victory over the Ottomans

- Part of the Spanish–Ottoman wars, the Ottoman–Habsburg wars and the Italian War of 1536–1538
Date	22–23 July 1537
Location	Antipaxos
Result	Christian victory

Belligerents
Spanish Empire; Republic of Genoa; Papal States; Knights Hospitaller	Ottoman Empire

Commanders and leaders
Andrea Doria; Leone Strozzi	Ali Çelebi

Strength
36 galleys	12 galleys

Casualties and losses
250 dead 1,250 wounded	1 galley sunk 11 galleys captured 2,500 dead 800 prisoners

The Battle of Antipaxos of 1537 was a naval encounter between a fleet captained by Andrea Doria, grand admiral of King of Spain and Holy Roman Emperor Charles V, and an Ottoman flotilla led by Ali Çelebi. It frames in the Italian War of 1536–1538, but events in its course led also to the beginning of the Ottoman-Venetian War of 1537-1540.

== Background ==
In early July 1537, the Ottoman armada under the command of Hayreddin Barbarossa and Lutfi Pasha with around 320 ships gathered in Valona, where Sultan Suleiman the Magnificent had concentrated a land army of 200,000. After meeting with French ambassador Jean de La Forêt, they agreed to disembark in Italy from the south while King Francis I of France invaded Italy from the north. Deploying 10,000 men in Apulia and finding Brindisi and Otranto too well defended, they sacked their countryside, and afterwards managed to take Castro after a false promise of peace through spy Troilo Pignatelli. Local resistance headed by Scipione di Somma and Viceroy Pedro de Toledo hampered their advance north.

Warning about the invasion had come too late to the imperial court, as there was a belief the Franco-Ottomans might attack Venice instead, but grand admiral Andrea Doria had deduced their true purpose, so he quickly gathered 28 galleys in Genoa and made his base in Messina. Doria tried to entice the Venetians to an alliance, but he found the same neutrality they had displayed years before in the conquest of Coron. His only available reinforcements at the moment were six Papal galleys under Virginio Orsini, as well as four other galleys promised by the Order of St. John under Leone Strozzi. Although evidently unable to confront directly the gigantic Ottoman fleet, Doria counted already enough ships to harass Barbarossa, which he materialized attacking the Ottoman rear guard in the Epirus coast and trying to cut their supply lines.

== Previous movements ==
On 13 July, Doria captured fourteen cargo ships which supplied the Ottomans from Jewish backers in Alexandria. Another encounter happened on 18 July, when Doria cornered and captured in the Ottoman coast the three ships carrying Turkish ambassador Janus Bey, who was journeying to the Venetian colony of Corfu to meet admiral Girolamo da Pesaro and address a series of fortuitous hostilities between Venetians and Turks. Janus believed wrongly that Pesaro had laid a trap for him with Doria's complicity, and so he told Suleiman by letter, which coldened the relationships between both sides and made the Sultan start thinking about making war against Venice in the future.

Five days later, after meeting with Strozzi, Doria sighted another flotilla of twelve large Turkish galleys between the Diapontian Islands, which turned out to be transports of Janissaries captained by Ali Çelebi, Pasha of Gallipoli and commander of success and fortune.

== Battle ==
Attacking near Antipaxos before the sunbreak, Doria divided the Christian fleet in three sections, with himself at the center with fourteen galleys, twelve to the left under his cousin Antonio Doria and twelve at the right under Strozzi, and ordered to envelope the enemy galleys with the comfort of their advantage in numbers. Çelebi took time to answer as he lacked visibility of what he was facing, but immediately formed up and fought on. The battle extended for three hours, with the Janissaries boarding the Christian galleys and capitalizing on the confusion of ships to compensate their disadvantage, with morning of day 23 came upon a still raging battle. The 71 year old Doria himself was wounded by shrapnel in his knee, but continued directing the battle while standing.

The encounter was decided not by numbers, but technical superiority. The Christian ships were equipped with innovative stepped gun carriages which allowed to mount and dismount them along the ship easily. By repositioning the galleys' artillery on the broadsides and firing unceasingly, especially from the Papal and Maltese squads in order to create a flanking, the battle turned towards their favor, inflicting great damage and sinking one of the Ottoman galleys. The surviving Janissaries eventually surrendered, symbolically throwing their swords to the sea so they could not be taken. The battle was surprisingly bloody, as the Ottomans counted 2,500 dead and 800 prisoners wounded almost all, while the Christians lost 250 men and had over one thousand wounded, among them Andrea and Antonio Doria.

The Christians repaired all of their ships on the coast of Paxos and returned to Messina with the captured fleet in tow. Barbarossa later came with 135 galleys, but the opposition had vanished by then.

== Aftermath ==
On 11 August, Suleiman decided that Francis was either unable or unwilling to fulfil his part of the deal of invading Italy by both extremes, so he ordered the army, by then stationed in Ugento, to reembark and leave the Italian peninsula. Doria saw his opportunity and allowed the Ottoman fleet to capture a small ship carrying a false letter for Venetian admiral Girolamo Pesaro, in which he pretended they were secretly allied and advised him to attack the Turkish fleet on its way back to Valona. When Suleiman found about the letter's content, he immediately acted on his plans to attack Corfu, which was besieged on 26 August.

== Bibliography ==
- Fernández Duro, Cesáreo (1895). Armada Española, desde la unión de los reinos de Castilla y Aragón, tomo I. Instituto de Historia Naval.
- Guglielmotti, Alberto (1876). La guerra del pirati e la marina pontificia: dal 1500 al 1560. Firenze.
- Lingua, Paolo (2015). Andrea Doria: Principe e pirata nell'Italia del '500. Fratelli Frilli. ISBN 9788869430992.
