= Hugo of Moncada =

Spanish political and military leader (c.1476–1528)

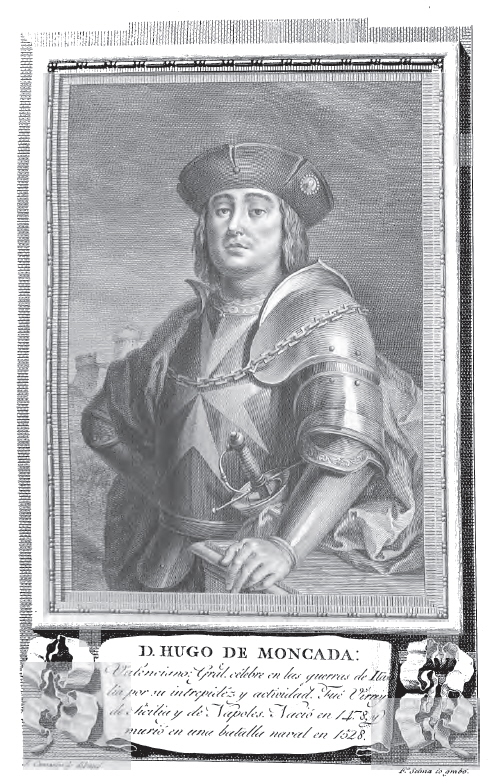
Hugo of Moncada

Hugo de Moncada (also Ugo de Moncada), (born Chiva, Valencia, circa 1476 - died Gulf of Salerno, 28 April 1528) was a Spanish political and military leader of the late 15th and early 16th century. He served as General of Ocean and Land, Viceroy of Sicily, 1509–1517, and Viceroy of Naples, 1527–1528.

== Early life ==
He was one of the sons of Gastón de Moncada, Sieur of Moncada, 10th Sieur of Aitona (or Aytona) Sieur of Serós, and Mequinenza, who had married Angelica de Tolça y Ripoll, lady of the baronies of Palma, Ador and Benarche in the kingdom of Valencia, Spain. Hugo was a younger brother of Juan de Moncada y de Tolça.

As a young man, he was made a Knight of the Sovereign Military Order of Malta.

== Service with the French ==
In 1495, he fought in Italy on behalf of king Charles VIII of France, who was in a dispute over Naples with the Spaniards using the services of Cesare Borgia. In 1496, he fought with the French in Catalonia and Roussillon.

== Service with the Spanish ==
Under Ferdinand II of Aragon he fought against Berber privateers in Italian waters, being promoted to Viceroy of Sicily in 1509 keeping such position till 1517. In 1513, he helped the Count of Oliveto, Pedro Navarro, attack the port of Tripoli providing galleys from Sicily. In 1520 he led the successful Spanish assault on Djerba. In 1522, as a general for Charles V, Holy Roman Emperor, he besieged the battlements of Tournai. In 1524, with 16 galleys, he attacked and took the ramparts of Toulon, Hières and Frejus. In January 1525 he tried to reconquer imperial territories lost to Andrea Doria, allied to the French King, he attacked the town of Varazze with a force of three thousand soldiers, but he was defeated and captured. He was liberated in 1526 by the Treaty of Madrid. Under the terms of this Treaty, Moncada was exchanged for Montmorency. In June 1526, Moncada was sent by Emperor Charles V, as an ambassador to Pope Clement VII in Rome. Moncada carried a message to the pope that should he ally with the French in the War of the League of Cambrai that Charles V would seek to turn the city-state of Siena in northern Italy against the Papal States and would also use his influence with the Colonna family to also turn this important Italian family against Pope Clement VII. Pope Clement recognized the potency of these two threats and as the French marched into Lombardy, Pope Clement withdrew all his forces back to Rome.

== The Sack of Rome ==
Moncada took command of the armies to take Lombardy and then marched to Rome. In May 1527, Moncada's Imperial troops sacked Rome. Ultimately, Moncada aided Clement VII, when the latter finally became a supporter of the emperor Charles V. In September 1527, Charles de Lannoy, the Viceroy of Naples died and Moncada was appointed in his place. In 1528, in the harbour of Naples, Moncada was blockaded by the French fleet under the command of the Genoese mercenary captain Filippino Doria. In the main naval battle of the whole of the Italian wars, Moncada tried to break out of the blockade that surrounded Naples. All of the ships of Moncada's fleet were sunk or captured and Moncada was killed during the battle on 28 April 1528.

== Some references ==
- Mallett, Michael and Shaw, Christine, The Italian Wars: 1494-1559 (Harlow, England: Pearson Education Limited, 2012).
- http://www.grandesp.org.uk/historia/gzas/aitona.htm
