= USS Andrew Doria =

Two vessels of the United States Navy have been named Andrew Doria, which is the anglicized name of Italian admiral Andrea Doria.

- Andrew Doria, a Continental Navy brig built in 1775, and served until 1778.
- USS Andrew Doria (IX-132), a former Italian tanker built in 1908

== See also ==
- SS Andrea Doria
