= Battle of Capo d'Orso =

1528 naval battle during the War of the League of Cognac

Coordinates: 40°36′N 14°36′E

- Part of the War of the League of Cognac
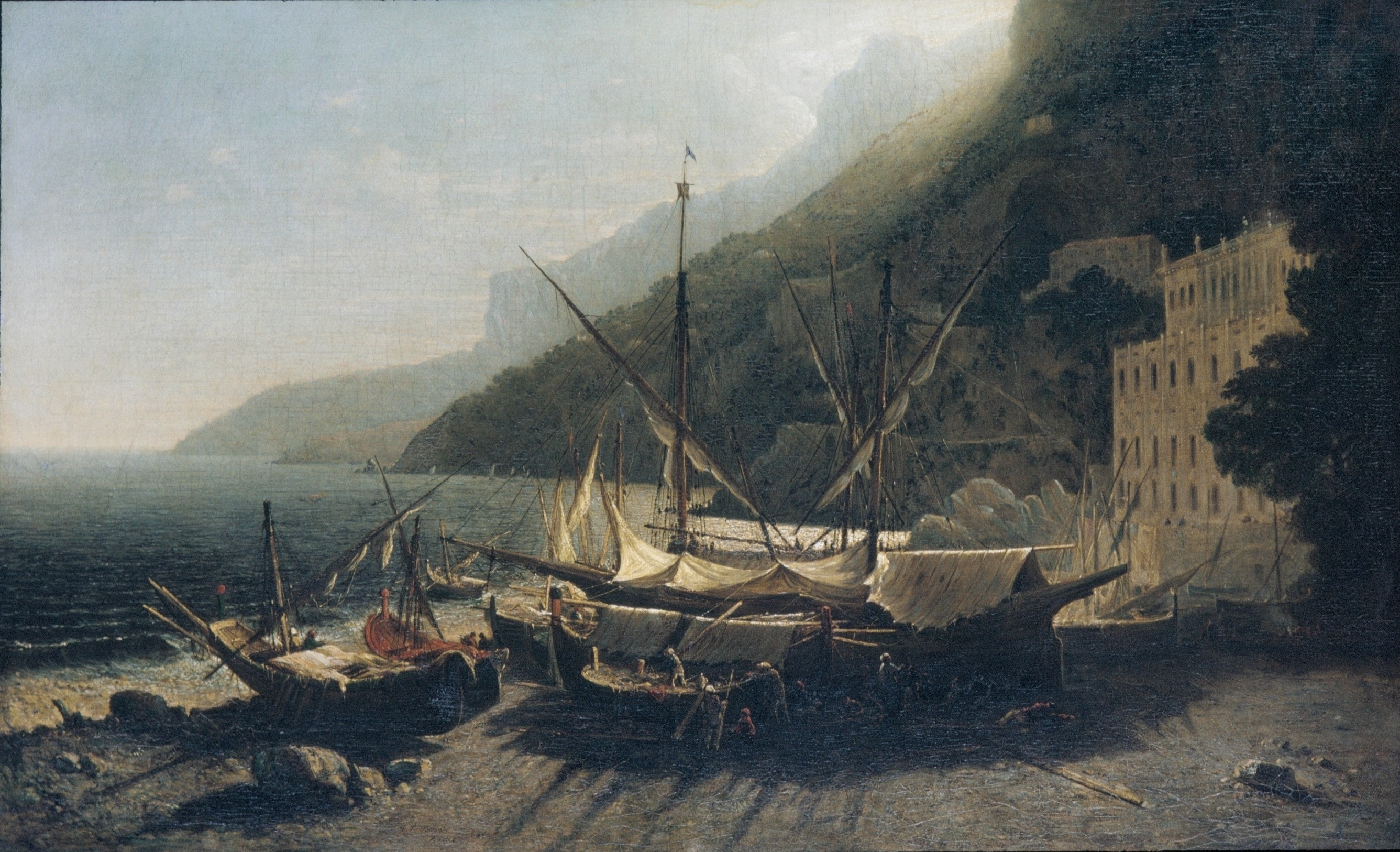
- View at Amalfi, Bay of Salerno, George Loring Brown
Date	28 April 1528
Location	Gulf of Salerno, Tyrrhenian Sea
Result	French victory

Belligerents
Kingdom of France	Spain

Commanders and leaders
Filippino Doria; Gilbert du Croq	Alfonso d'Avalos; Hugo de Moncada †

Strength
8 galleys	6 galleys; 3 brigantines; 2 fustes; 2 sailboats

Casualties and losses
500 killed	700 killed; 600 captured; 2 galleys sunk; 1 brigantine sunk; 1 fuste sunk; 4 galleys captured; 1 fuste captured

The Battle of Capo d'Orso, sometimes known as the Battle of Cava and the Battle of Amalfi, was a naval engagement taking place from 5:00 PM to 9:00 PM on April 28, 1528, during the War of the League of Cognac. A French fleet inflicted a crushing defeat on the fleet of the Kingdom of Naples under Spanish command in the Gulf of Salerno, where Spanish forces trying to break the French blockade of the city met the French fleet.

The battle gave the French complete command of the sea. Tactically, it showed the superiority of the chosen Genoese galleys over the slower and less agile Spanish ones, despite the presence aboard of a large party of veteran Spanish soldiers. As noted by a witness, Paolo Giovio, "the victory came from crafty seamanship rather than brute force".

== Background ==
Francis I of France, after his humiliating defeat at Pavia in 1525, rekindled the war in Italy, this time with the support of Pope Clement VII, the Republic of Venice, the Kingdom of England, the Duchy of Milan, and the Republic of Florence, all parties to the League of Cognac and worried about the ascendancy of Charles V in Italy and in Europe. The conflict began in 1526.

Despite some important initial successes such as the sack of Rome in 1527, the Spanish army was quickly disintegrating due to a dramatic lack of funding. By the end of 1527, a French army under the viscount of Lautrec was moving southwards from Central Italy, capturing cities one by one and rapidly pushing the Spaniards out of their prized possession in the region, the Kingdom of Naples. If the city of Naples were to fall into French hands, Charles V would lose his last foothold in the peninsula and France would become the dominating power in the central Mediterranean.

== Blockade of Naples ==
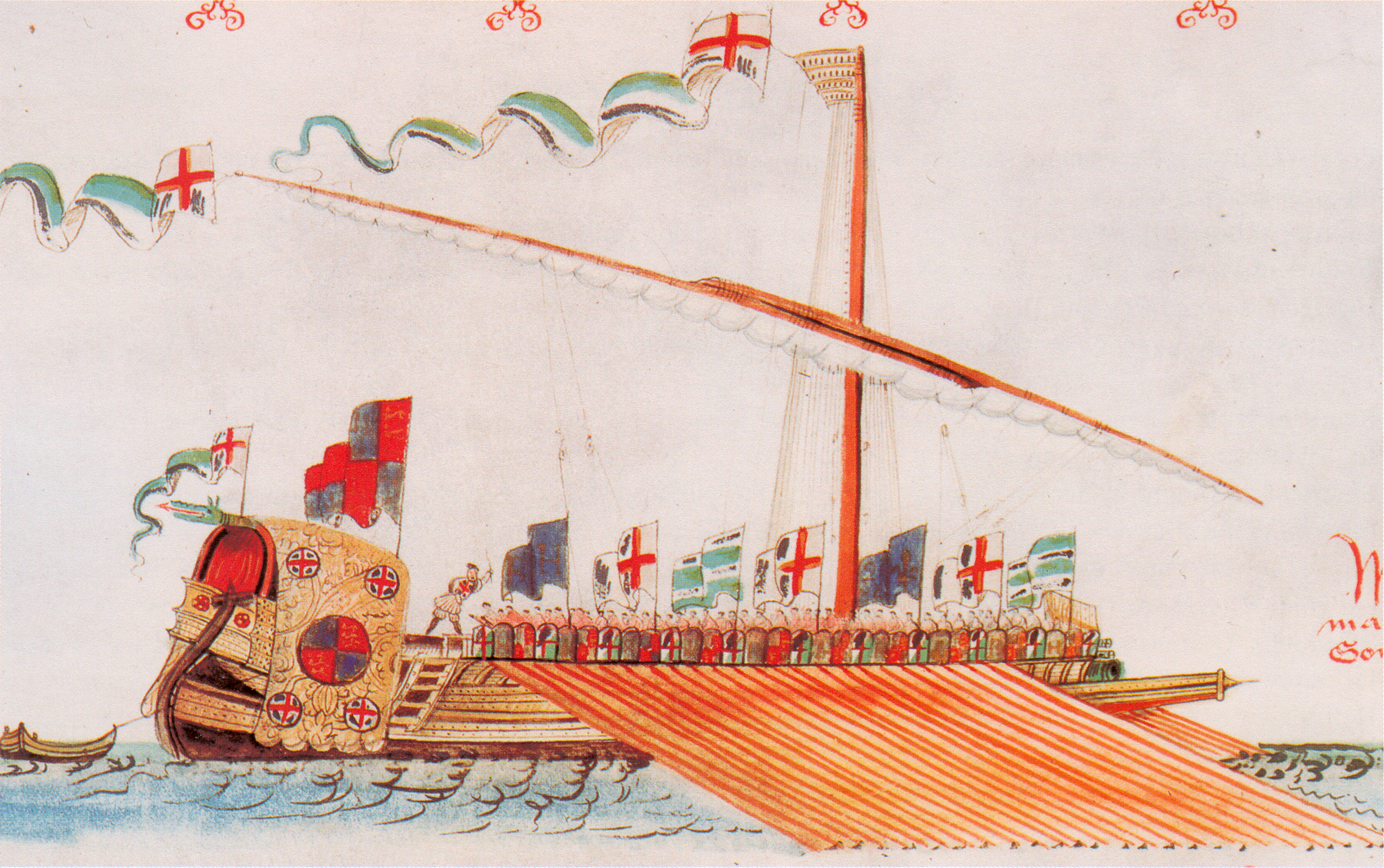
Mediterranean-style galley (Anthony Roll, c.1546).

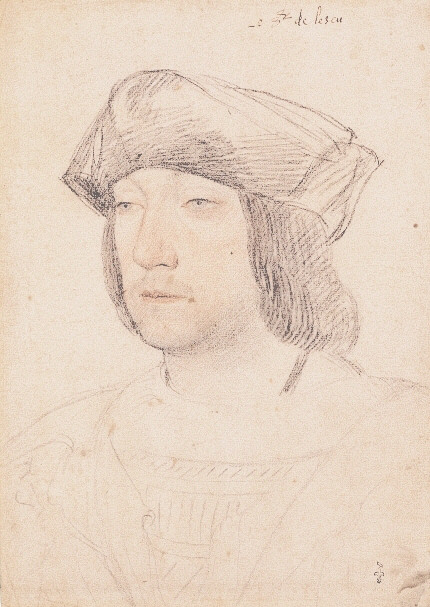
Portrait of the viscount of Lautrec (Jean Clouet, early 16th century, Musée Condé).

Mid-April, the French forces under the viscount of Lautrec reached the walls of Naples. The city was well defended and attempts to seize it by force by land and sea were pushed back, and a real siege began. The French cut the aqueducts bringing fresh water to Naples and, as the city had but a few wells, thirst quickly became a problem for the besieged. Food supplies were also fairly low. The Spaniards had but twenty days worth of wine and meat and between three and five months of grain. The French had also captured the main mills of the region and there were none in the city, forcing the Spaniards to use the extremely labour-intensive hand-mills. Spies notified the Venetians of several mutinies in the army among German, Italian, as well as Spanish regiments.

Naples could also be supplied from the sea as Sicily was rich in grains and still in Spanish hands. The French dispatch to Naples part of their fleet, namely a squadron of galleys belonging to the mercenaries shipowners Andrea Doria and Antonio Doria hired by the French since 1522. This squadron was under the command of the nephew of Andrea Doria, Filippino, and with the Genoese nobleman Nicolò Lomellino as second in command. The patrols of the French navy prevented the arrival of supplies from Sicily – two ships carrying wheat for the besieged Neapolitans were intercepted by Filippino Doria mid-April. The fleet also captured several points along the coastline (Capri, Pozzuoli, Castellammare and Procida). The number of vessels in the French fleet was however insufficient to keep the blockade completely tight as the galleys could not spend more than a few hours at sea at the time and the French galleys needed to return to their base near Salerno every night. The French refused to allow Andrea Doria to send more galleys in reinforcement to Southern Italy as they were expecting the prompt reinforcement of the Venetian fleet, then sailing around Apulia, to seal off the city completely. But the Venetians were delayed by the sore state of their galleys and several operations against Spanish strongholds in Apulia such as Monopoli, Otranto, and Lecce.

In the city, the Spaniards awaited naval reinforcement from Sicily, but it failed to materialise. The Naples squadron would have to face the French on its own. It was made out of galleys rented from Castilian, Catalan, and Italian shipowners serving at will for the Spanish Crown. With only six large galleys, it was outnumbered and outgunned by the French eight vessels. Typically, the Spanish captains avoided contact with the enemy and rested on stealth for their operations outside the harbour. For instance, hoping to go unnoticed and to be able to land in Gaeta or Castellammare where they could use the windmills to grind their grain into flour, the Spanish fleet took to the sea in the morning of April 27. But the Neapolitan squadron was rapidly spotted by the French who manoeuvred to intercept the Neapolitan galleys. Unprepared for battle, the Spanish fleet opted for a hasty retreat back to the safety of the harbour.

== The Spanish plan of action ==
Despite their inferiority, the Spanish command decided to attack the French fleet. Historian Maurizio Arfaioli hypothesizes that the choice may have been the result of a power play within the Spanish high-command as Hugo de Moncada, veteran of many campaigns in the Mediterranean, saw a naval operation as the best chance to counter the prominence of the young Philibert of Chalon, Prince of Orange, a brilliant general but who had never fought on the sea. The squabble of the Spanish generals led to the designation of a third man as the chief of the flotilla: Alfonso d'Avalos, marchese del Vasto, but nonetheless don Hugo joined the fleet, albeit not as its main commander, while Philipert de Chalon remained in Naples.

Aware of the greater seamanship of the Genoese, the Spaniards decided to fill their galleys with "chosen troops" to guarantee their superiority during the hand-to-hand phase of the combat, once ships were locked one with the other and boarding parties sent onto the enemy's vessels. Some 700 veteran Spanish soldiers and 200 German Landsknechts under the command of Konrad Glorn were embarked on the galleys to complement the Spanish marines. To make the Spanish fleet appear larger than it really was, it was decided that dozens of lesser vessels would join the galleys.

Steps were also taken to ensure the loyalty of the Genoese navy officers and sailors serving on the Neapolitan squadron as the Spaniards were to be confronted by a French fleet heavily manned by their fellow countrymen. The commander of the Neapolitan squadron, Fabrizio Giustiniani, in particular, was suspected as he happened to be the father-in-law of Antonio Doria, one of the main mercenaries serving on the French side.

== Order of battle ==
The Spanish fleet
- 6 galleys of Neapolitan squadron of the Spanish navy
  - Gobba – Fabrizio Giustiniani, "il Gobbo" (the Hunchback)
  - Secana- unknown Catalan captain called Sechanies
  - Santa Andrea – Bernardo Villamarino
  - Capitana (flagship) – Alfonso d'Avalos
  - Perpignana – Orazio de Barletta
  - Calabrese – Francès de Loria
- 2 fustes
- 3 brigantines
- Many lesser vessels

The French fleet
- 8 galleys belonging to Andrea Doria (7) and Antonio Doria (1)
  - Pellegrina
  - Donzella
  - Capitana (flagship) – Filipino Doria
  - Fortuna
  - Sirena
  - Nettuna – Nicolò Lomellino
  - Segnora
  - Mora

== The battle ==
=== The approach ===
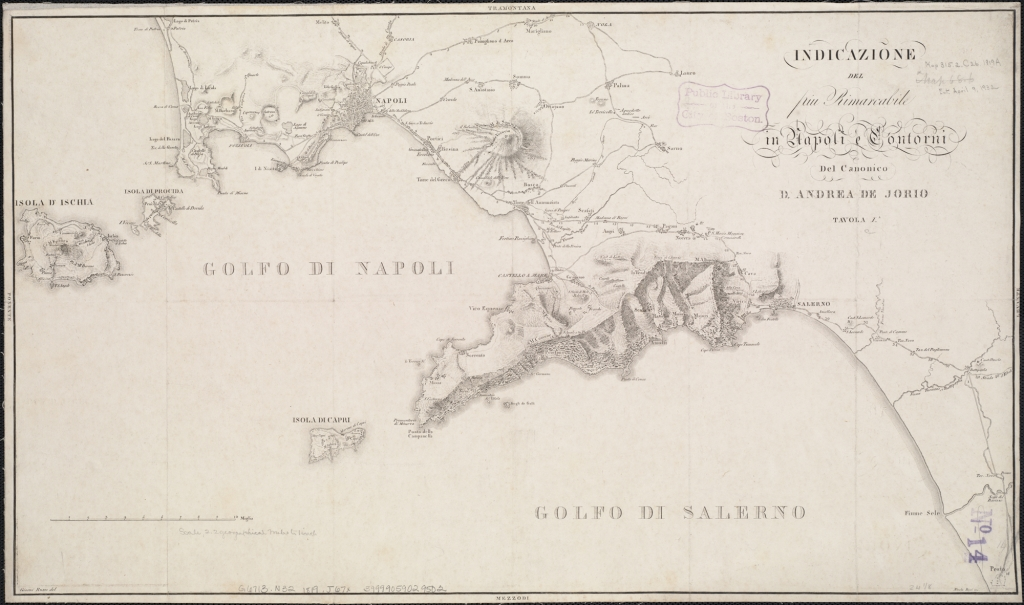
The Gulfs of Naples and Salerno (Andrea Jorio, 1819).

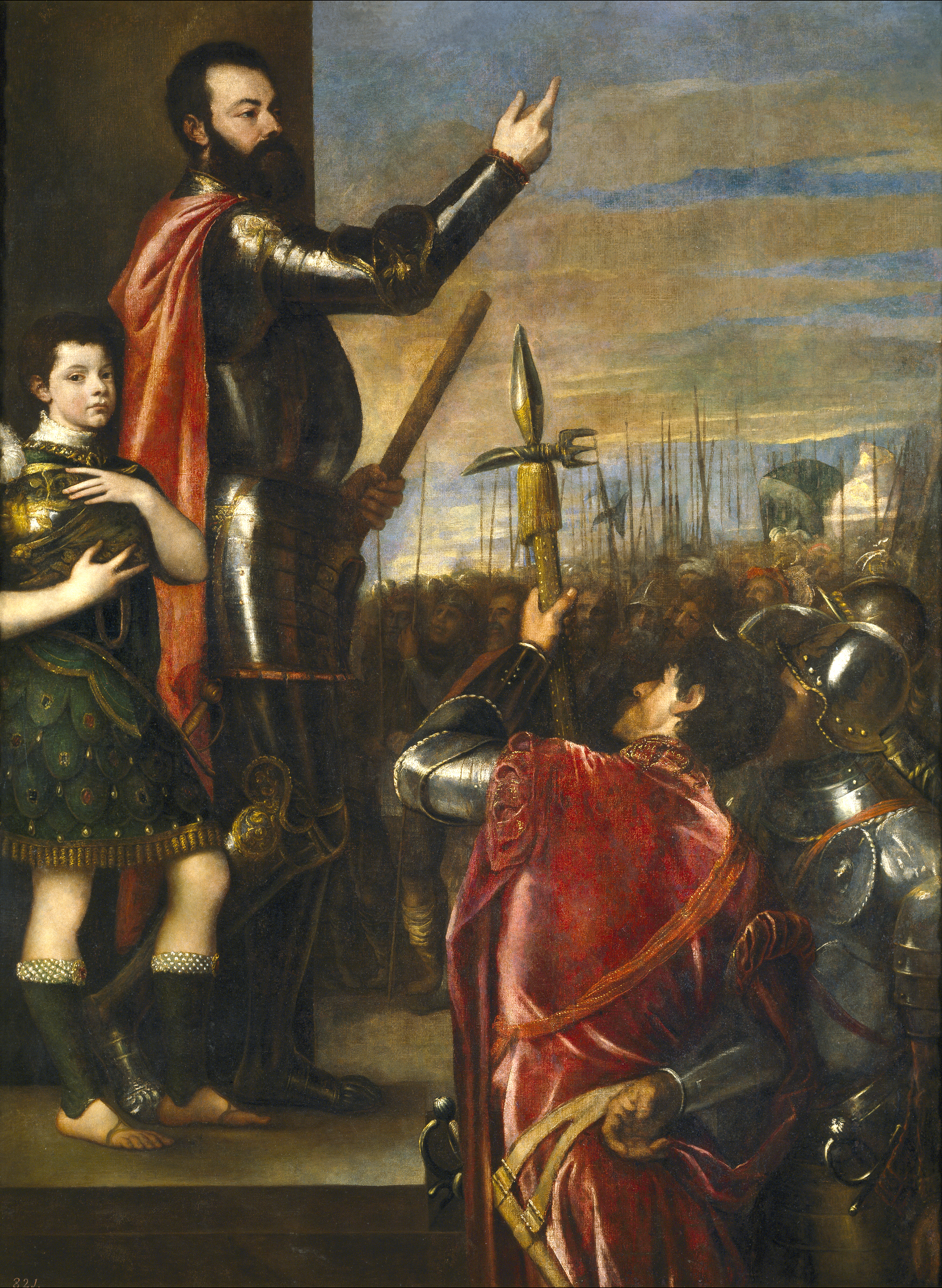
Alfonso d'Avalos addressing his troops in 1537 (Tiziano oil painting, c. 1540, Prado Museum, Madrid).

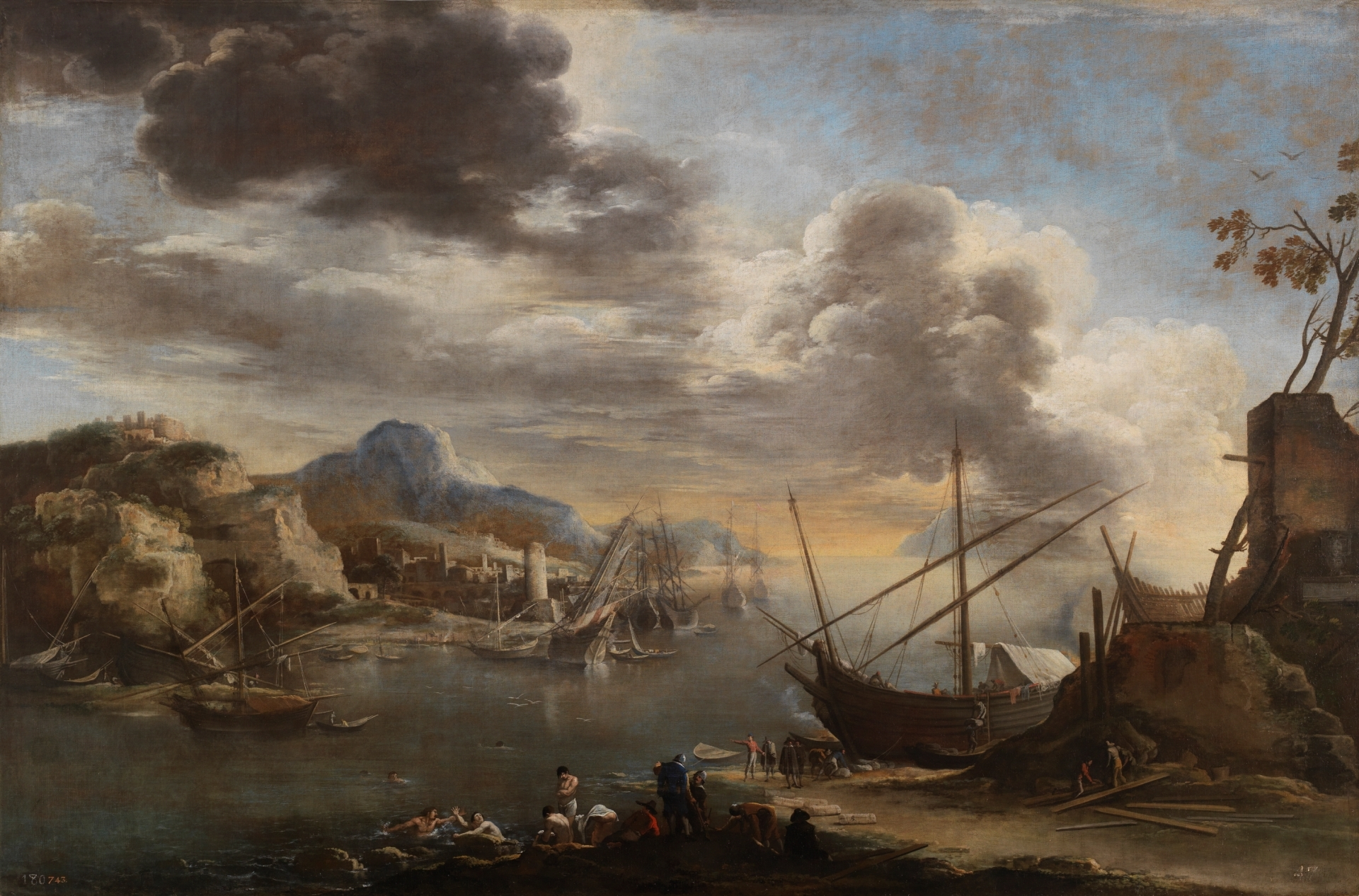
View of the Gulf of Salerno (Salvator Rosa oil on canvas, c. 1640, Prado Museum, Madrid).

On the evening of April 27, the Spanish fleet exited anew the port of Naples and sailed westwards one and half nautical mile to Posillipo just outside the city walls and spent the night there. In the early hours of the morning of April 28, the Spanish fleets sailed south to Capri, 17 nautical miles away from Naples. This time, the Spanish fleet had been spotted late by the French lookouts and the fleet of Filippino Doria was still grounded in Salerno. The Spaniards could sail unopposed in the Bay of Naples and potentially catch the French fleet still anchored and unable to fight them.

Filippino Doria dispatched a pressing demand for reinforcement to the French commander, the viscount of Lautrec. But the French camp was far away and no support would reach the fleet before the mid-afternoon. Several authors of the time mention that once in Capri, the Spanish officers of the Spanish fleet lunched leisurely (Hugo de Moncada had apparently brought musicians with him) and the men listened to a protracted sermon by Portuguese hermit Gonsalvo Baretta (who enticed them to fight the Genoese, qualified of "white Moors"). The Spanish fleet left Capri in the afternoon, overtook the Punta della Campanella and proceeds due East towards Amalfi. The delays caused by the lunch and the hermit's sermon are long enough for the French reinforcements to reach the fleet. At 4:00PM, some 300 Gascon musketeers under the command of Gilbert du Croq arrive at Vietri and are hastidly embarked on wehe galleys to complement the Genoese marines. The French fleet then sails due East towards the Spanish squadron.

=== Early Spanish success ===
With dozens of vessels, the Spanish fleets looked very impressive and three French ships – the Nettuna, the Segnora, and the Mora – broke formation and escaped southward. With his remaining vessels, Filippino Doria was largely outnumbered. The Genoese sailors, aware of the disadvantage, considered themselves as good as dead. The Genoese captain engaged the enemy nonetheless around 5:00PM. The French fleet opened fire first with the large guns of the bow. One of the shots from Filippino Doria's Capitana main basilisco killed 32 Spanish soldiers and officers aboard the Capitana of d'Avalos. The Spanish artillery, on the other hand, was largely ineffective. The Spanish infantry, exposed on the galleys, was also exposed to heavy fire from the Gascons musketeers protected by a palisade aboard the French ships. But the crew of the Spanish managed to grapple the French flagship and the Spanish soldiers boarded the adversary.

Despite the losses, the rest of the Spanish fleet managed nonetheless to manoeuvre and to begin to board three of the four other remaining French galleys. On the northern flank, the Neapoletan Gobba, the Secana, and the Sant'Andrea surrounded the French Pellegrina and the Donzella. The boarding parties were led by captains Cesare Fieramosca and Garcia Manrique de Lara. Both French vessels were in great difficulty and about to be captured. Meanwhile, on the southern flank, the German landsknechts aboard the Spanish galleys Perpignana and Calabresa also reached close-quarter combat with the French vessels Fortuna and Sirena. The Sirena was isolated and captured.

=== French counter-attack ===
Severely out-numbered, the French were unlikely to hold long. But, while the battle wes raging, the three French ships which had broken formation earlier changed path and returned to the fight. It was a ruse of Filippino Doria performed by his second-in-command, the mercenary and Genoese nobleman, Nicolò Lomelino. Travelling North-East in the late afternoon, the three galleys may have been hidden from view by the sunset and to have gone undetected by the Spanish fleet.

The three ships of Nicolò Lomelino attacked the Spanish Capitana from the rear. After being hit by artillery, the Spanish flagship was rammed by Lomellino's Nettuna. The hand-to-hand battle that ensued was particularly bloody. Several Spanish officers were killed, including don Hugo de Moncada, hit by two arquebuse balls. He died shouting "Fight brothers, victory is ours". The Genoese soldiers showed great skill in the combat by, as a witness remarked later, "like leopards leaping from one galley to the next". Casualties were mounting on both sides, the Gascons had lost over half their men and the French were still significantly outnumbered and found themselves in difficulty. To tip the scales in his favour, Filippino Doria freed the rowers, the ciurma, made of delinquents, criminals, and Muslim captives from their chains and promised their freedom if they fight for him. They accepted and boarded the Spanish vessels. Defeated, the few surviving Spaniards were forced to surrender.

The three galleys of Lomellino then turned to three other Spanish galleys, the Pellegrina, the Donzella, and the Gobba. As they approached, the French ships unleashed "a storm of cannonballs thick as a hail". Fabrizio Giustiniani, "il Gobbo" was wounded and out-of-combat and the Neapolitan captain Cesare Fieramosca, in charge of the infantry, was thrown into the sea by a direct hit. The Spanish galley Gobba was boarded and had to surrender. The Spanish troops on the other two galleys, despite support from two brigantines and two basque sailboats, were clearly outnumbered. Their oars were broken and they were beginning to sink so they could not disengage and escape. The Spanish also had to give up the fight and surrender as the two galleys sank. The Spanish captain and sailor Bernardo Villamarino, the constable Ascanio Colonna, and Camillo Colonna, his brother, were made prisoners. The two fustes supporting them were also captured.

The last two Spanish galleys, the Calabresa and the Perpignana, were still engaged with the rest of the French fleet. A French boarding party, led by François de Scépeaux de Vieilleville, had even managed to take hold of part of the Perpignana. Seeing the day was lost, the crews of the Spanish vessels were nonetheless able to cut off the grapnels that tied them to the French galleys and to sail away – with the French party on board, now taken prisoners. It was about 9:00PM ("ad una hora di notte"), the battle had lasted four hours.

=== Later developments ===
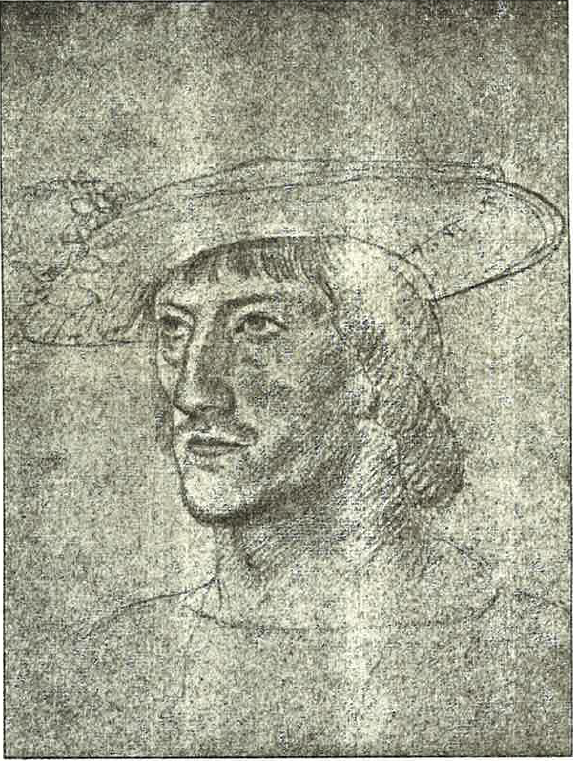
Portrait of Philbert Prince of Orange.

The Calabresa was the first to return to Naples. Angered by what he considered as cowardice, the Prince of Orange had all the officers of the ship, including its captain, the Catalan Francès de Loria, immediately hanged in full view of the harbour. (Note: While probably unfair, the punishment imposed on Francès de Loria is not extraordinary. In 1556, the Spanish officer Alonso Peralta was beheaded for abandoning Béjaïa to the Algerians and Gaspard de Vallier was stripped of his cloak as a knight of Saint-John in 1551 for having abandoned Tripoli to the Ottomans.) Understanding what awaited him, Orazio, the captain of the second galley decided not to return to Naples and headed Westwards with its French prisoners aboard and disappeared in the dark.

The following day, the Prince of Orange launched the Calabresa refitted and under a new captain in pursuit of Orazio. He encountered him near Capri towing a French galley apparently captured during the night. But as the Calabresa approached, Orazio opened fire on the Spanish vessel. He had changed sides during the night and boarded the Spanish vessel along with the French troops of the galley he was towing. The new captain of the Calabresa, Alfonso Caraccioli had to surrender.

== Aftermath ==
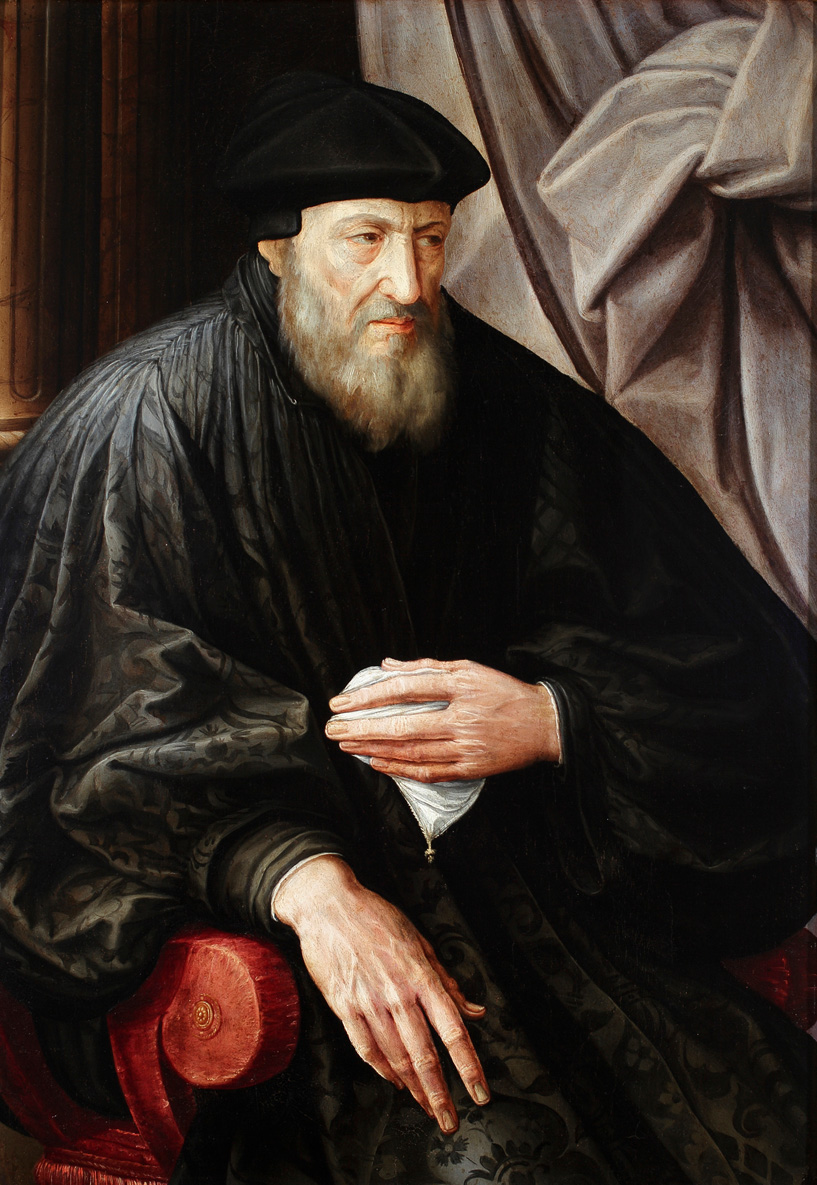
Portrait of Andrea Doria (Jan Matsys, 1555, oil painting, Galleria di Palazzo Bianco).

The Neapolitan squadron had been entirely wiped out during the battle and its aftermath. The Spaniards could not hope to break through the French blockade anymore. Worried about the fate of their husbands, the women of Naples deputised Paolo Giovio to enquire about the losses. He reported that 700 to 800 men had been killed on the Spanish side ("the flower of the Spanish army") and that about as many had been taken prisoner by the French. Numerous nobles and high-ranking officers and administrators were either dead or captive, including the commander of the fleet Alfonso d'Avalos. Among the soldiers, the losses were staggering. On the Spanish Capitana, every single one of the 150 soldiers had been killed, on the Gobba 103 out of 108 soldiers had fallen. Paolo Giovio's description of the galleys after the battle was most gruesome.

On the French side, the losses were also very heavy as the majority of the Gascon musketeers and a good many of the Genoese marines had perished. About 500 of the men of Filippino Doria were dead. On some galleys, the French had lost 75% of their soldiers. The cardinal Pompeo Colonna noted soon after that "it was the cruelest and bloodiest (sanguinolenta) battle fought on the sea in our times". Pope Clement saw the Spanish defeat as a just punishment for those who had sacked the Holy City a year prior, declaring: "the immortal God has not been a hesitant and tardy avenger of this infamous crime"

The siege of Naples continued on land as well as on sea. On May 1, the French captain in charge of the Gascon musketeers at the battle of Capo d'Orso was killed under the walls of the city. But the long-awaited Venetian fleet arrived on June 11, thus tightening a bit more the blockade of the city. On May 13, the news of the battle reached the French king in Paris and a te deum mass was immediately held in Notre Dame de Paris. In Naples, food supplies were being quickly exhausted, on June 14, the Prince of Orange already wrote about scarcities. At best the city could hold for a few more weeks before famine forced the Spanish troops to surrender.

The victors, however, had started to squabble about the prisoners. The Genoese mercenaries, in particular, refused to hand the main Spanish prisoners to the viscount of Lautrec as the French had before kept the ransoms for themselves. Instead, Filippino Doria dispatched the most important captives to his uncle in Genoa. There the Marchese d'Avalos opened negotiations with the Genoese admiral for him to change sides with his private fleet. During the month of June, letters were exchanged with Charles, Emperor and King of Spain. Finally, on June 30, Andrea Doria declared himself in favour of the Habsburgs and withdrew his support of France. By July 4, the news reached Naples and Filipino Doria abandoned the siege of Naples with his galleys.

The sea blockade of Naples was lifted while an epidemic broke out in the French camp and thinned out the ranks of the besiegers. On August 15, the viscount of Lautrec himself succumbed to the disease and the French troops had to withdraw from Southern Italy.

== In popular culture ==
Unlike many famous battles of the century such as Marignano, Pavia or Lepanto, the battle of Capo d'Orso has generated little attention. There seems however to exist a long poem composed by a participant to the battle, Ludovico di Lorenzo Martelli, describing the engagement, written during the poet's three-month captivity in Genoa.

== Bibliography ==
- Almagià, Guido (1935). "Capo d'Orso". Enciclopedia Italiana.
- Arfaioli, Maurizio (2001). The road to Naples: Florence, the Black Bands and the army of the League of Cognac (1526-1528) (PDF). Warwick: University of Warwick.
- Calabria, Antonio (2002). The Cost of Empire: The Finances of the Kingdom of Naples in the Time of Spanish Rule. Cambridge: Cambridge University Press. doi:10.1017/CBO9780511583520. ISBN 978-0-521-39176-4.
- Campodonico, Pierangelo (1997). Andrea Doria. Genoa: Tormena Editore.
- Capelloni, Lorenzo (1863). Vita del principe Andrea Doria. Genoa: V. Canepa.
- Cavanna Ciappina, Maristella (2001). "Giustiniani, Galeazzo". Dizionario Biografico degli Italiani (in Italian). Vol. 57: Giulini–Gonzaga. Rome: Istituto dell'Enciclopedia Italiana. ISBN 978-88-12-00032-6.
- Cavanna Ciappina, Maristella (1992). "Doria, Filippo". Dizionario Biografico degli Italiani (in Italian). Vol. 41: Donaggio–Dugnani. Rome: Istituto dell'Enciclopedia Italiana. ISBN 978-88-12-00032-6.
- Cosentino, Paola (2008). "Martelli, Lodovico". Dizionario Biografico degli Italiani (in Italian). Vol. 71: Marsilli–Massimino da Salerno. Rome: Istituto dell'Enciclopedia Italiana. ISBN 978-88-12-00032-6.
- De Caro, Gaspare (1962). "Avalos, Alfonso d', marchese del Vasto". Dizionario Biografico degli Italiani (in Italian). Vol. 4: Arconati–Bacaredda. Rome: Istituto dell'Enciclopedia Italiana. OCLC 883370.
- De La Roncière, Charles (1906). Histoire de la marine française. Vol. III. Les Guerres d'Italie. Paris: Librairie Plon.
- De Negri, Felicita (1997). "Fieramosca, Cesare". Dizionario Biografico degli Italiani (in Italian). Vol. 47: Ferrero–Filonardi. Rome: Istituto dell'Enciclopedia Italiana. ISBN 978-88-12-00032-6.
- Farinella, Calogero (2001). "Giustiniani, Bricio". Dizionario Biografico degli Italiani (in Italian). Vol. 57: Giulini–Gonzaga. Rome: Istituto dell'Enciclopedia Italiana. ISBN 978-88-12-00032-6.
- Fernández Duro, Cesáreo (1895). Armada española desde la unión de los reinos de Castilla y de León. Vol. 1. Madrid: Sucesores de Rivadeneyra. pp. 138–152.
- Giovio, Paolo (1564). Delle istorie di mons. Giouio. Venice: Giorgio de Cavalli.
- Guicciardini, F. (1971). Storia d'Italia. Turin: Einaudi.
- Guilmartin, John Francis (2003). Gunpowder & Galleys: Changing Technology & Mediterranean Warfare at Sea in the 16th Century. Washington: Naval Institute Press. OCLC 54099996.
- Graziani, Antoine-Marie (2013). Andrea Doria. Paris: Tallandier. ISBN 9791021002548.
- Lo Basso, Luca (2007). "Gli asentisti del re. L'esercizio privato della guerra nelle strategie economiche dei Genovesi (1528-1716)" (PDF). R. Cancila. Mediterraneo in Armi. Mediterranea. Palermo: 2712–81.
- Manfroni, C. (1901). Storia della Marina italiana. Vol. III. Livorno: Regia Accademia Navale.
- Musiol, Maria (2013). Vittoria Colonna: A Female Genius of Italian Renaissance. Berlin: epubli GmbH. ISBN 9783844257502.
- Pedìo, Tommaso (1971). Napoli e Spagna nella prima metà del Cinquecento. Bari: F. Cacucci.
- Pedìo, Tommaso (1974). Gli spagnoli alla conquista dell'Italia. Reggio Calabria: Editori Riuniti meridionali.
- Pelaez, Mario (1934). "Martelli, Ludovico". Enciclopedia Italiana.
- Petrucci, Franca (1982). "Colonna, Camillo". Dizionario Biografico degli Italiani (in Italian). Vol. 27: Collenuccio–Confortini. Rome: Istituto dell'Enciclopedia Italiana. ISBN 978-88-12-00032-6.
- Petrucci, Franca (1982). "Colonna, Ascanio". Dizionario Biografico degli Italiani (in Italian). Vol. 27: Collenuccio–Confortini. Rome: Istituto dell'Enciclopedia Italiana. ISBN 978-88-12-00032-6.
- Price Zimmermann, T. C. (2001). "Giovio, Paolo". Dizionario Biografico degli Italiani (in Italian). Vol. 56: Giovanni Di Crescenzio–Giulietti. Rome: Istituto dell'Enciclopedia Italiana. ISBN 978-88-12-00032-6.
- Robert, Ulysse (1902). Philibert de Châlon. Prince d'Orange, Vice-Roi de Naples (18 mars 1502-3 août 1530). Paris: Plon, Nurrit et Cie.
- Saletta, Vincenzo (1975). La spedizione di Lautrec contro il Regno di Napoli: contributo alla storia del Mezzogiorno d'Italia. Roma: C. E. S. M.
- Santoro, Leonardo (1858). Dei successi del sacco di Roma e guerra del regno di Napoli sotto Lotrech. Naples: Androsio.
- Setton, Kenneth M. (1984). The Papacy and the Levant (1204–1571), Volume III: The Sixteenth Century to the Reign of Julius III. Vol. 3. Philadelphia: The American Philosophical Society. ISBN 0-87169-161-2.
- Troso, Mario (2001). Italia! Italia! 1526-1530: la prima guerra d'indipendenza italiana : con gli assedi di Milano, Napoli, Firenze, il sacco di Roma e le battaglie di Capo d'Orso e Gavinana. Parma: E. Albertelli. ISBN 9788887372250.
- Vitale, Vito Antonio (1934). "Lomellini". Enciclopedia Italiana.
- Völkel, Markus (1999). Die Wahrheit zeigt viele Gesichter: der Historiker, Sammler und Satiriker Paolo Giovio (1486-1552) und sein Porträt Roms in der Hochrenaissance. Basel: Schwabe. ISBN 9783796513510.
- Williams, Philip (2014). Empire and Holy War in the Mediterranean: The Galley and Maritime Conflict between the Habsburgs and Ottomans. New York: I.B.Tauris. ISBN 9781784533755.
