= Conquest of Coron (1532) =

Spanish–Italian campaign in Ottoman Greece

Battle of Antipaxos
- Part of the Spanish–Ottoman wars, the Ottoman–Habsburg wars and the Italian War of 1536–1538
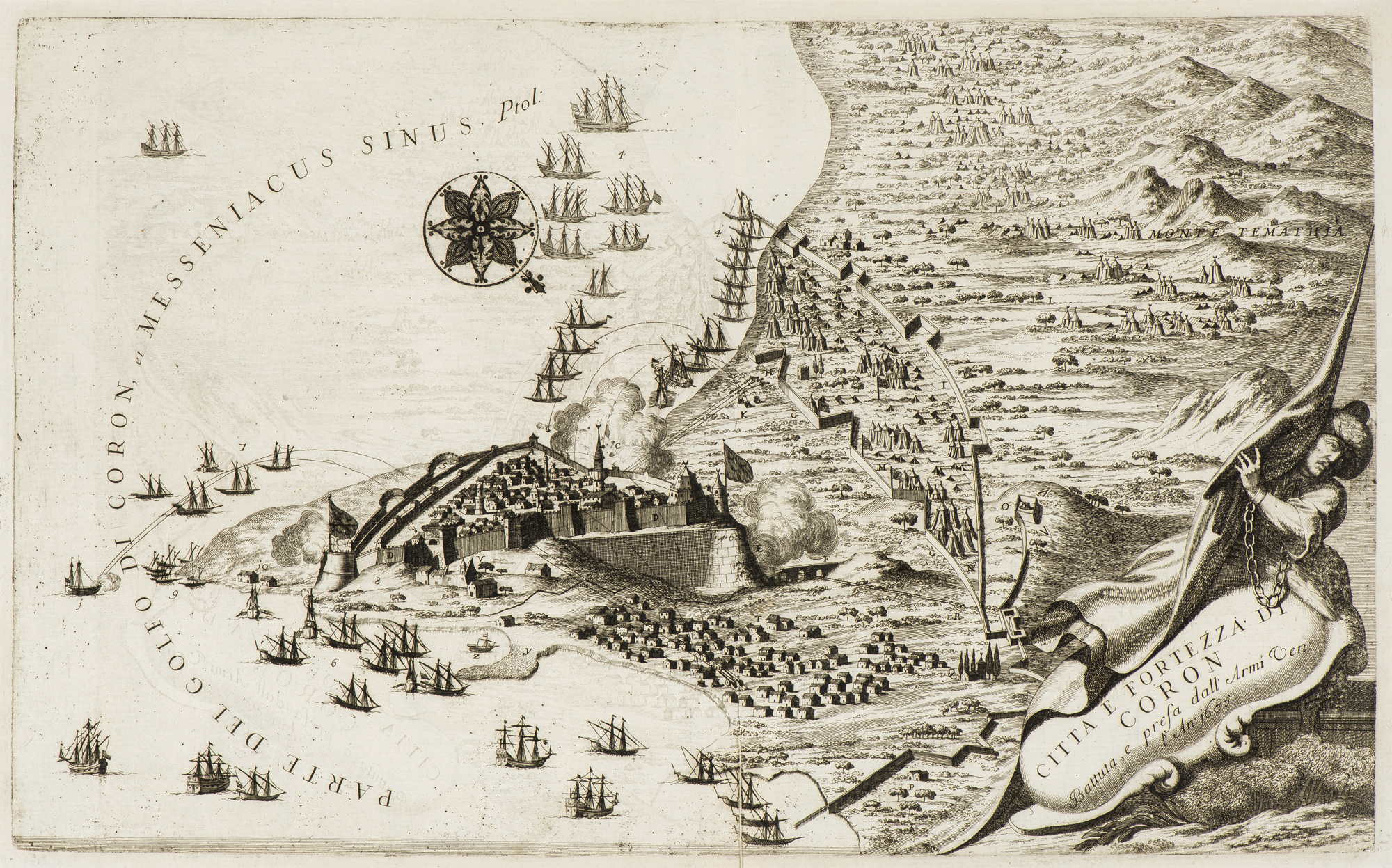
- Coron in 1692.
Date	22–23 July 1532
Location	Coron, Morea
Result	Christian victory

Belligerents
Spanish Empire; Republic of Genoa; Papal States; Knights Hospitaller; Greek rebels	Ottoman Empire

Commanders and leaders
Andrea Doria; Jerónimo de Mendoza; Bernardo Salviati	Zadar

Strength
44 galleys 15 carracks and galleons 35 naus 12,000 soldiers	Unknown

Casualties and losses
Minor	Significant

The Conquest of Coron in 1532 was the core of an amphibious campaign led by Andrea Doria, grand admiral of the King of Spain and Holy Roman Emperor Charles V, to divert the pressure of the Ottoman Empire on Eastern Europe.

== Background ==
Ottoman Sultan Suleyman the Magnificent started a new campaign on Vienna after being forced away from it by Charles in the 1529 siege, marching in April 1532 over Hungary with an imposing contingent of 200,000 men and 300 cannons. In response, imperial admiral Andrea Doria proposed to launch a naval expedition to attack the coasts of Ottoman Greece, hoping to force Suleyman to return to defend them. The emperor ordered him to also destroy the Ottoman armada if he could find it.

The armada sailed off in September. It was composed of 17 galleys from Spain, 4 from the Viceroyalty of Sicily and 3 from that of Naples, along with 5 from the Order of St. John, 13 from the Papal States and two from Monaco, complemented by 35 naus and 15 carracks and galleons, with 12,000 men in total. The carracks included the famed Santa Anna, which had single-handedly routed the private fleet of Ottoman corsair Hayreddin Barbarossa the previous year. Doria commanded the fleet, with his cousin Antonio Doria as his second in command, Jerónimo de Mendoza captaining the land troops and Bernardo Salviati in charge of the St. John galleys. Doria had no fixed plan and would order the actions as he saw fit when they arrived in Greece.

== Previous movements ==
While passing by Zante, the fleet came upon the Venetian armada, formed by 60 galleys in order of battle captained by Vincenzo Capello. The Venetians offered supply and port, but declined to join the effort due to their peace treaty with the Ottomans. Doria attempted to persuade them to break the accords, pointing out the continuous threat the Ottomans posed for Venice, and even proposed to a joint raid on Constantinople to capitalize on the chance of Suleyman being in Hungary, but again Capello declined. The proposal was nonetheless unlikely given that the enterprise would have required higher authorization. In turn, the allies came to believe Capello was trying to distract them to allow time to escape for the nearby Ottoman armada, composed by 70-80 galleys and fustas captained by Omer Ali.

Doria sent Antonio with seven galleys to track Omer Ali down, but he found out the Ottoman armada had already sailed around Cerigo and headed to Calcis. They additionally found out the Ottoman armada had suffered a Bubonic plague outbreak, discouraging them to pursue it further. The allied fleet took port in Sapienza, close to the former Venetian colony of Modon, now a Turkish port. Salviati proposed to conquer it, reminding a previous attempt by the Order of St. John and Greek rebels which almost succeeded. However, Doria deduced the Ottomans would have reinforced Modon in prevision of a similar attack, so he chose Coron, another former Venetian colony nearby which was defended mainly by its rough terrain and altitude. He was contacted by several other Greek rebels for this.

== Siege ==
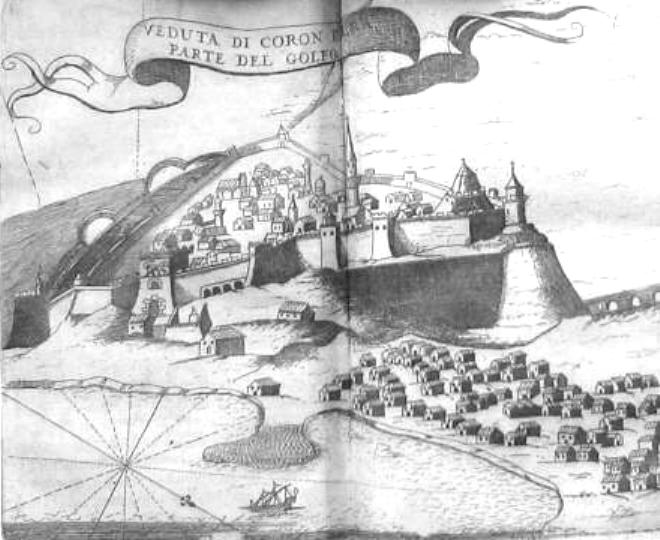
Fortress of Coron in 1692.

Doria ordered the fleet in a semi-circle around the Coron isthmus with the sailing ships as close to land as possible, using armored skiffs to anchor them from afar while under enemy fire. Ensured the positions, he built floating siege ramps on bridges between the naus, high enough to reach the walls of the fortress and manned by rodeleros. To provide cover fire for them, he placed arquebusiers, musketeers and even light artillery in the ships' rigging, innovatively fitting pairs of culverins and falconets on the topsails of the two biggest naus, therefore enabling the Christians to fire in a greater angle.

He also placed 35 of the galleys tied by their sterns in pairs back to back, divided in three groups of six pairs, in order to bombard the place while moving continuously so they would not be hit back by enemy fire. The galleys at the front would advance to fire their bow guns, after which the galleys at the back would tow them away from enemy range while reloading, with the groups alternately advancing and falling back, as in volley fire. The infantry and the rest of the artillery disembarked at both sides of the istums, commanded by Jerónimo de Mendoza and Girolamo Tuttavilla, Count of Sarno. The artillery was thus placed in three sections.

Bombardment of the fortress began on September 12, firing on it from over 170 artillery pieces. A first assault by Sarno through a breached wall was repulsed with 300 dead, which a more cautious Mendoza subsequently decided not to try from his side yet. To prevent the attack of possible relief forces, they built entrenched and bastions. It was rather the siege engines which decided the battle, as the ramps were placed against the fortress' battlements and allowed the Spanish to assault them directly. The rodeleros overwhelmed quickly the defenders, who abandoned the walls and took refuge in the citadel while the Christians sacked the place.

The following day, a Christian Greek warned about Turkish reinforcements coming by land in the form of 700 horsemen led by Zadar, from the nearby garrison of Laconia. He was first repulsed by Erasmo Doria, who turned the galleys' artillery against him, forcing him to take a detour and attack instead the Christian camp defended by Teodoro Spinola. However, with the help of 300 arquebusiers sent by Sarno, Zadar and the Ottoman cavalry were trapped in a moat, being either defeated or wiped out according to the version. The Christian collected the corpses' head and placed them in front of the citadel to reduce the morale of the defenders, who eventually surrendered on September 21.

Doria allowed the Ottomans of the city to leave with their wives and children, except by a group of Jews he retained as hostages. However, local Greeks capitalized on the chance to ambush the leaving Ottomans and kill most of them.

== Aftermath ==
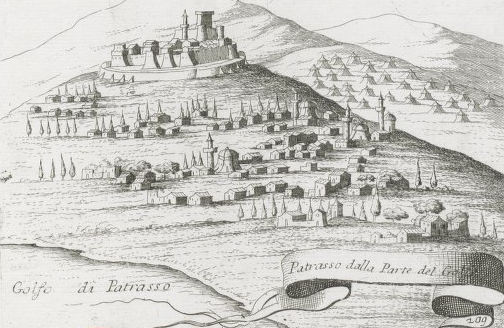
Patras in 1689.

The siege happened concurrently with the Battle of Leobersdorf, in Hungary, where Charles' continental allies defeated part of the Ottoman army in Hungary. Taken the fortress, Doria left Mendoza there with 2,500 Spaniards, along with local Greek allies. They entertained to invest the following weeks in build a second fortress or attacking Navarino, but ultimately decided to continue the campaign towards the nearby Patras, a city well garrisoned but weakly fortified. Sitting camp in Zante, Doria submitted the city easily in exchange for not to harm the population, which he fulfilled and enforced harshly, executing soldiers who broke it. Erasmo Doria was left with a garrison in Zante, although they were later evacuated.

The fleet then turned towards the gulf of Corinth, putting their sight on the twin castles named Dardanelles which closed the entry, one in Achaea and the other in Aetolia, which featured heavy artillery to prevent the passage of ships. Doria solved the problem with the first fortress by disembarking his own artillery and placing it aimed to the fortress' weak spots, forcing it to surrender. Meanwhile Sarno besieged the Aetolian castle and defeated Turkish cavalry force coming from Lepanto, forming an infantry square with light artillery pieces in the corners which routed the Ottomans. Eventually, he breached the wall and captured the fortress, whose Janissaries chose to blow themselves up with all the gunpowder available before surrendering.

Salviati sacked the coasts of Greece towards the Genoese colony of Chios in the Aegean Sea, where he was informed that the Ottoman fleet had returned to Constantinople. With winter coming, and the news that they had achieved the goal of drawing Suleyman away from Hungary, Doria gave order to end the expedition. They returned in November, with the fleet carrying much booty for over 60.000 ducats. They brought with them the castles' artillery, formed by cannons so large that reportedly an average man could comfortably sit inside the barrel. The capture of Coron greatly vexed Suleyman, to the point he threatened the imperial ambassador in Constantinople, Cornelis de Schepper, with demolishing the Church of the Holy Sepulchre in Jerusalem to build a mosque in its place if the fortress was not handed back to him. He also offered to give the Peñón of Algiers back to Spain in exchange for it. However, he received no answer.

== Bibliography ==
- Abercrombie, Gordon Ellyson (2024). The Hospitaller Knights of Saint John, 1523-1565. Pen and Sword. ISBN 9781399039345.
- Íñigo Fernández, Luis E. (2015). Breve historia de la batalla de Lepanto. Nowtilus. ISBN 9788499677477.
- García Cereceda, Martín (1873). Tratado de las campañas y otros acontecimientos de los ejércitos del emperador Carlos V en Italia, Francia, Austria, Berberia y Grecia desde 1521 hasta 1545 · Tomo 12, Parte 1. Indiana University.
- Fernández Duro, Cesáreo (1895). Armada Española, desde la unión de los reinos de Castilla y Aragón (PDF). Vol. I. Instituto de Historia Naval.
- Guglielmotti, Alberto (1876). La guerra del pirati e la marina pontificia: dal 1500 al 1560. Firenze.
- Jovio, Paulo (1563). Historia general de todas las cosas succedidas en el mundo en estos 50 anos de nuestro tiempo. Biblioteca Nacional de Austria.
- Sojo y Lomba, Fermín (1928). El capitán Luis Pizaño: estudio histórico-militar referente a la primera mitad del siglo XVI. Memorial de Ingenieros del Ejército.
- De Sotto, Serafín María (1851). Historia orgánica de las armas de infantería y caballería españolas, 3: desde la creación del ejército permanente hasta el día. Ateneo de Barcelona.
- Vilar Sánchez, Juan Antonio (2015). Carlos V: emperador y hombre. EDAF. ISBN 9788441436084.
