= Filippino Doria =

Genoese admiral

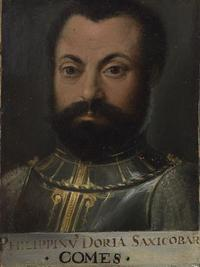
Filippino Doria

Filippo or Filippino Doria (between 1470 and 1480 – between 1548 and 1558) was a Genoese admiral from a cadet branch of the Doria family.

== Life ==
He was one of two sons of Bartolomeo Doria and Lucrezia Del Carretto, making him a nephew of Andrea Doria. He became a soldier at an early age since the family fortune was only modest. He initially served the della Rovere family then Francesco Maria I della Rovere, Duke of Urbino. He left Urbino's service sometime after reaching his adulthood at around 1510, returning to the della Rovere family in the form of pope Julius II. He served under Andrea Doria, who put him in command of the war against the Barbary pirates by the Papal States and their French allies.

In 1519 Filippino won attention for his major contribution to the victory at the battle of Pianosa by attacking the pirates from the rear with two galleys just when all seemed lost. He confirmed his allegiance to Andrea by accompanying him in his flight from Genoa after it was sacked by the Spanish in 1522. The pair took four galleys and sailed to Monaco to enter the service of Francis I of France.

He probably took part with Andrea in his conspiracy against Luciano Grimaldi, the defence of Marseille from the sea in 1524, the supply chain down the Rhone, the lucky capture of Philibert of Chalon and the daring plan to spring Francis from captivity after the battle of Pavia in 1525.

The pair entered pope Clement VII's service after Pavia - he was then an ally of France. Andrea left his eight galleys under his nephew's command in Civitavecchia while he went to Rome to discuss naval strategy with Pope Clement VII. Filippino took two ships to Portofino to assist in holding off an attack by doge Antoniotto Adorno in September 1526, which was aimed at relieving the blockade of Genoa. When news of the Sack of Rome reached Andrea's fleet, it sailed from Liguria to Fiumicino to aid Pope Clement. Filippino made a failed attempt to land a group of soldiers and spring the pope from his effective captivity in Castel Sant'Angelo. The fleet sailed back towards Genoa, with Pope Clement unable to pay it. The contract between Andrea Doria and Pope Clement expired in August 1527 and the fleet switched back to French service, with Francis I making Andrea his supreme naval commander in the Mediterranean.

The fleet sailed to Savoy to pick up Marshal Lautrec and his troops for a new campaign against the Empire. Andrea, with a fleet of 24 galleys, 16 of which were French, reinstated the blockade of Genoa and sent Filippino back to Portofino. There, Filippino was attacked on land and captured on 15 August, but Andrea's reaction was instantaneous, forcing Doge Antoniotto Adorno to abandon Genoa on 19 August. Once freed, Filippino seems to have opened the gates of the city to his cousin and to Cesare Fregoso.

In September Andrea and Filippino attacked Castello Aragonese on Sardinia, but they were hit by a storm as well as a stout defence and so Filippino was reassigned to occupy Sassari. Still under Andrea's orders, he then brought his cousin's seven galleys and Antonio Doria's galleys into Livorno to repair over the winter. When the naval war resumed in spring 1528, Andrea was ordered to sail to assist Marshal Lautrec in the siege of Naples, but refused and instead sent Filippino with eight galleys. He anchored in the Gulf of Salerno, blockading the city.
He defeated the Spanish in the naval battle of Capo d'Orso, killing Naples' governor Hugo of Moncada who attempted a breakout by sea on 28 April.

Both he and Andrea then went over to the Empire in June–August 1528, returning to free Naples from the French and then arriving off Genoa on 10 September. That night, Filippino led one of two landing parties which stormed the city shouting "St George and liberty!", capturing the town hall and city gate. He then starved out the garrison in the Castelletto fortress and later captured the seaport city of Savona.
In 1529 Andrea made him captain general and the doge made him gonfalone of the Republic of Genoa. He helped save Andrea from the Fieschi conspiracy in 1547, leading a band of 2,000 men with Agostino Spinola to defeat the last rebel stronghold at Montoggio. He predeceased Andrea sometime between 1548 and 1558.
