= Andrea Doria =

Admiral of the Republic of Genoa (1466–1560)

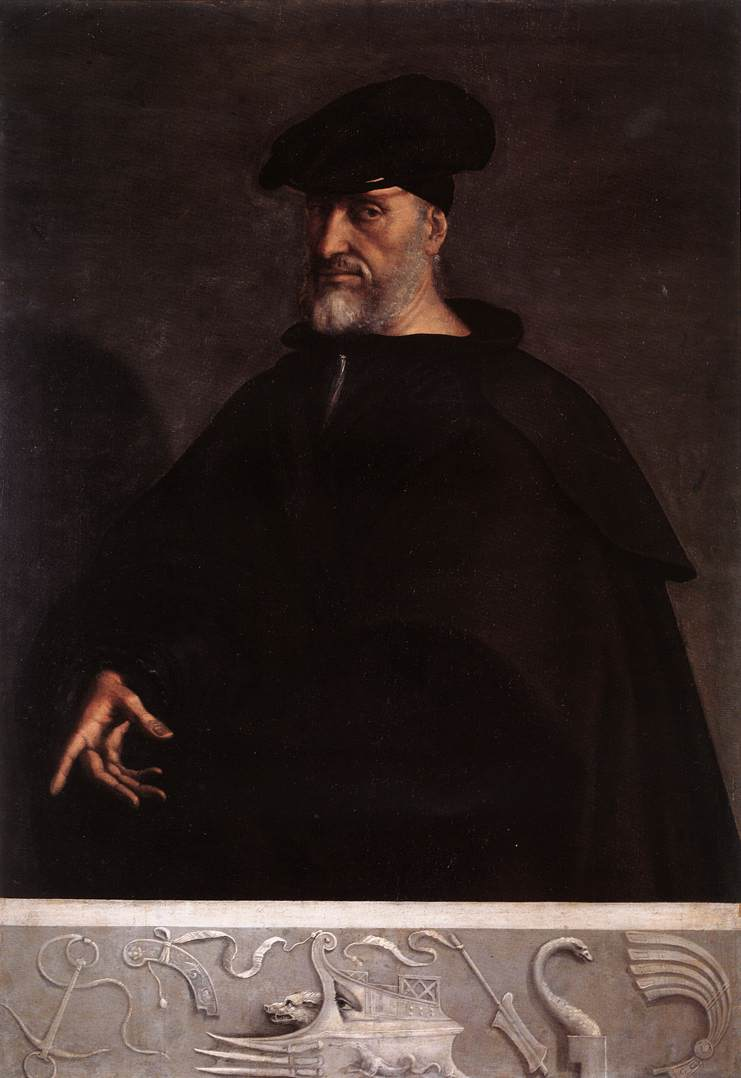
- Portrait of Andrea Doria, c. 1520, by Sebastiano del Piombo
- Born: 30 November 1466; Oneglia, Republic of Genoa
- Died: 25 November 1560 (aged 93); Genoa, Republic of Genoa
- Military career
- Allegiance: Duchy of Urbino; Papal States; Republic of Genoa; Kingdom of France; Kingdom of Spain; Holy Roman Empire
- Conflicts: Genoese-Barbary conflicts; Battle of Pianosa; Italian War of 1521–1526; Siege of Marseille; Ottoman–Habsburg wars; Campaign of Cherchell (1531); Conquest of Coron; Siege of Coron; Conquest of Tunis; Battle of Preveza; Siege of Algiers; Conquest of Mahdia; Italian War of 1536–1538; Battle of Antipaxos; Italian War of 1542–1546; Siege of Nice; Italian War of 1551–1559; Battle of Ponza; Invasion of Corsica (1553)

Andrea Doria, Prince of Melfi (Italian: [anˈdrɛːa ˈdɔːrja]; Ligurian: Drîa Döia [ˈdɾiːa ˈdɔːja]; 30 November 1466 – 25 November 1560) was an Italian statesman, condottiero and admiral, who played a key role in the Republic of Genoa during his lifetime.

Doria was considered the foremost naval leader in Europe at his time. From 1528, he served as Holy Roman Emperor Charles V's grand admiral in the Mediterranean, as well as his main shipbuilder along with Álvaro de Bazán the Elder, while also acting as a privateer with the ships he owned in order to increase his own wealth. Although he had mixed success against the power of the Ottoman admirals, his fleet helped secure the imperial naval lines between Spain and Italy. He also played a role in the development of amphibious warfare by the Spanish and Italian navies.

As a citizen of Genoa, Doria used his relationship with Charles V to both protect the republic's independence and exercise a predominant influence in its councils. He refused official charges, accepting only the title of Father of the Fatherland, and instead ruled the republic as an economic and military player. Under his reforms, the Doge's office was reduced to two years instead of being elected for life, while plebeians were declared ineligible, and the appointment was entrusted to the members of the great and the little councils. His constitutional reforms would last until the end of the republic in 1797.

His posterior historical reputation became influenced by the lens of his Venetian rivals, which accused him of unstrategic and duplicitous conduct in battle. Even then, several ships in the next centuries were named in his honour, the most famous being the Italian passenger liner SS Andrea Doria, launched in 1951, which sank following a collision in 1956.

== Early life ==
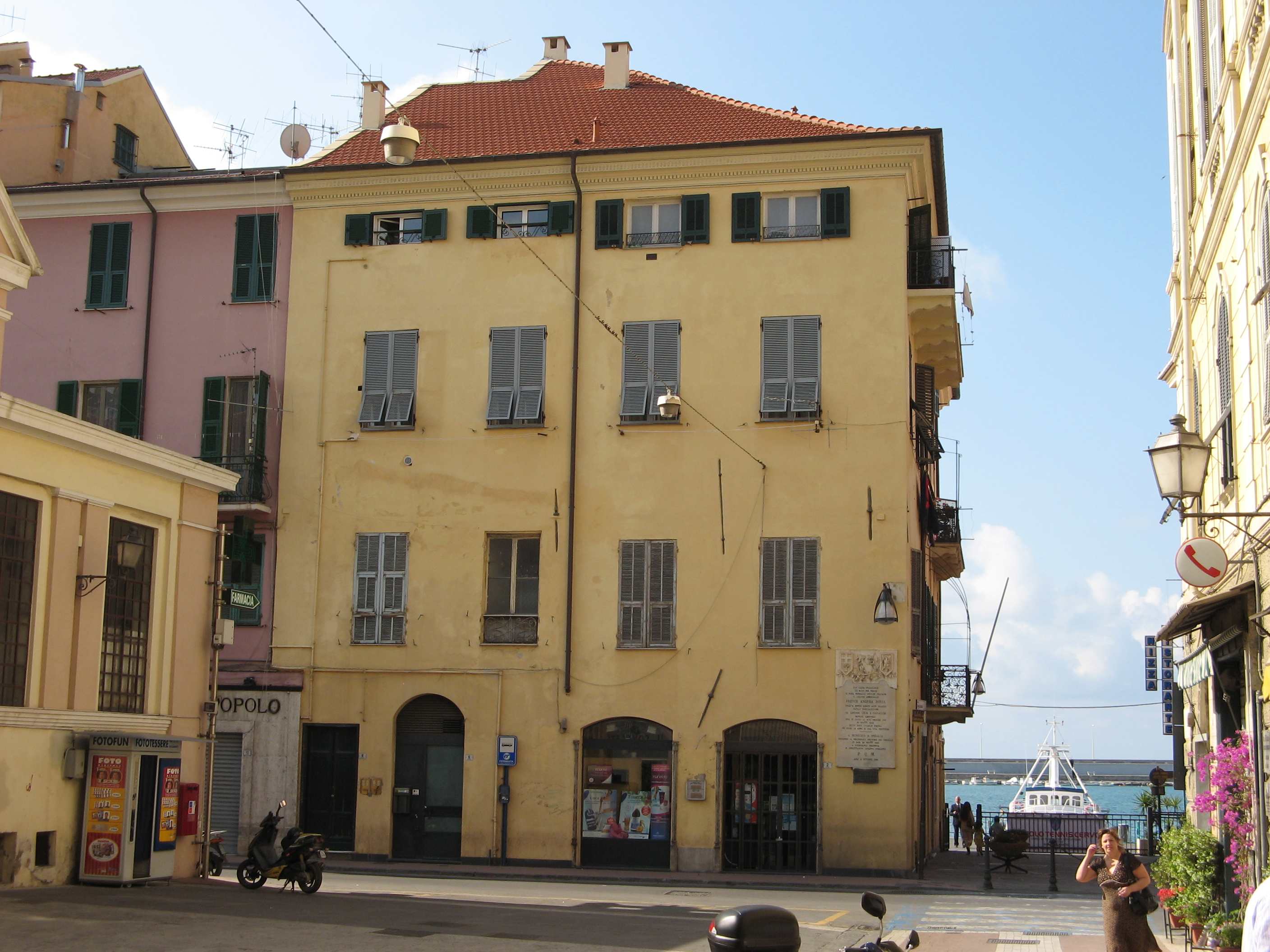
Natal home of Andrea Doria in Oneglia

Doria was born at Oneglia from the ancient Genoese family the Doria di Oneglia, a branch of the noble Doria family, who played a major role in the history of the Republic since the 12th century. His parents were related: Ceva Doria, co-lord of Oneglia, and Caracosa Doria, of the Doria di Dolceacqua branch. Orphaned at an early age, he became a soldier of fortune, serving first in the papal guard and then under various Italian princes. He soon gained enough renown for Gonzalo Fernández de Córdoba, the premier general of the age, to tempt him to join him.

== In the service of France ==
In 1503, he fought in Corsica in the service of the Genoese Navy, at that time under French vassalage. However, after the Battle of Ravenna of 1512, he turned against the Francophile government of Genoa represented by Gian Fregoso. At age 46, despite having no previous naval experience, Doria was appointed admiral and took it upon himself to reorganize the existing Genoese fleet. A French invasion of Genoa forced him and his fleet to escape to La Spezia. With the French defeat in Novara the following year, Doria returned and conquered the local French garrison in Briglia, expelled them from Genoa, and helped Ottaviano Fregoso (a nephew and foster son of Doria's former patron Guidobaldo da Montefeltro Duke of Urbino) to become the new Doge.

Doria also scoured the Mediterranean in command of the Genoese fleet, waging war on the Turks and the Barbary pirates. When a fleet led by the brothers Aruj and Hayreddin Barbarossa, coming from a failed siege of the Spanish port of Béjaïa, captured a Genoese ship in 1512, Doria attacked the brothers' base in La Goulette with twelve galleys, sacking the place and destroying the ships in port. In the meanwhile, however, Genoa was recaptured by the French, as a new change of tide in Marignano forced Fregoso to pledge Genoa to King Francis I of France in 1515. Doria focused in his actions against Muslims, defeated another Turkish fleet led by Caid Ali or Cadolin at Pianosa in 1519, capturing his ships for his own fleet.

=== Italian Wars ===
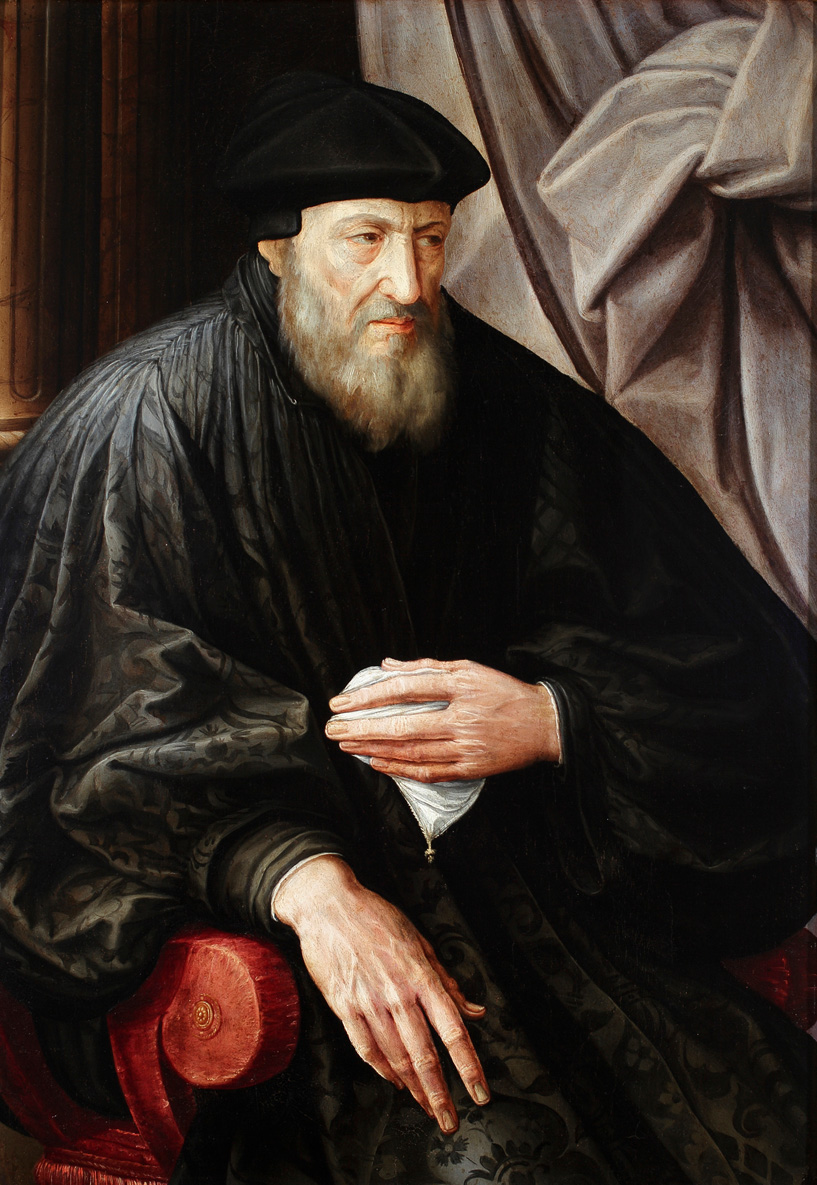
Portrait tentatively identified with Doria. Jan Massys, 1555.

In 1522, during the Italian War between France and the empire of Charles V, King of Spain and Holy Roman Emperor, Genoa was conquered and sacked by imperial troops under the command of Prospero Colonna and Fernando d'Ávalos, forcing Doria to escape with the fleet again. Taking refuge in Monaco, he helped the French defend Marseille in 1524, but the war came to an abrupt end when Francis I was captured by the imperial army in Pavia in 1525. Doria prepared a plan to rescue him, but Francis ordered him to refrain.

Doria then clashed with Francis' regent, Anne de Montmorency, and abandoned French service, forming a naval mercenary fleet. In June 1526, at the head of thirteen ships, he crossed paths again with Hayreddin Barbarossa in the coast of Civitavecchia, defeating the Turkish and capturing fifteen of his sixteen vessels, with Barbarossa managing to escape in his flagship alone.

However, Doria ended up siding with France again when Pope Clement VII formed the League of Cognac to oppose Charles V, for which Doria was hired to command their armada while Giovanni delle Bande Nere did the same in their land army. Doria defeated a bigger Spanish fleet in Corsica and planned to conquer Genoa, still under imperial rule, but it was never carried on. With Giovanni's death in action and the sack of Rome by mutinied imperial troops, the situation worsened for the League of Cognac, who depended on Doria more than ever.

In 1528, the League's armada, under the command of Doria and his nephew, Filippino Doria, crushed a Spanish fleet on 28 April 1528 at the Battle of Capo d'Orso, capturing the enemy commanders Alfonso d'Avalos and Ascanio Colonna. However, Andrea became dissatisfied with his treatment at the hands of Francis, who was mean about payment and replaced Doria for the French admiral Antoine de La Rochefoucauld. Meanwhile, d'Avalos capitalized on the chance to try to convince Doria to switch sides, with Doria refusing to hand d'Avalos and Colonna to Francis as the king asked. Charles V and Doria exchanged letters, and although Francis found out about it and attempted to compensate the Genoese, the latter deserted the French for the emperor on June 1528.

== In the service of Spain ==
Without Doria's fleet, the League collapsed. The Genoese lifted the siege of Naples, chasing La Rochefoucauld to Provence and capturing four of his ships. In September, Doria and his forces drove the French out of Genoa and were triumphantly received by the city. Charles appointed him grand admiral, prince of Melfi and Marquis of Tursi in reward for his services. He found Doria an invaluable ally in the wars with Francis I, and through him extended his domination over the whole of Italy. He continued to serve the emperor in various wars, in which he was generally successful and always active.

=== Ruling the Genoese republic ===
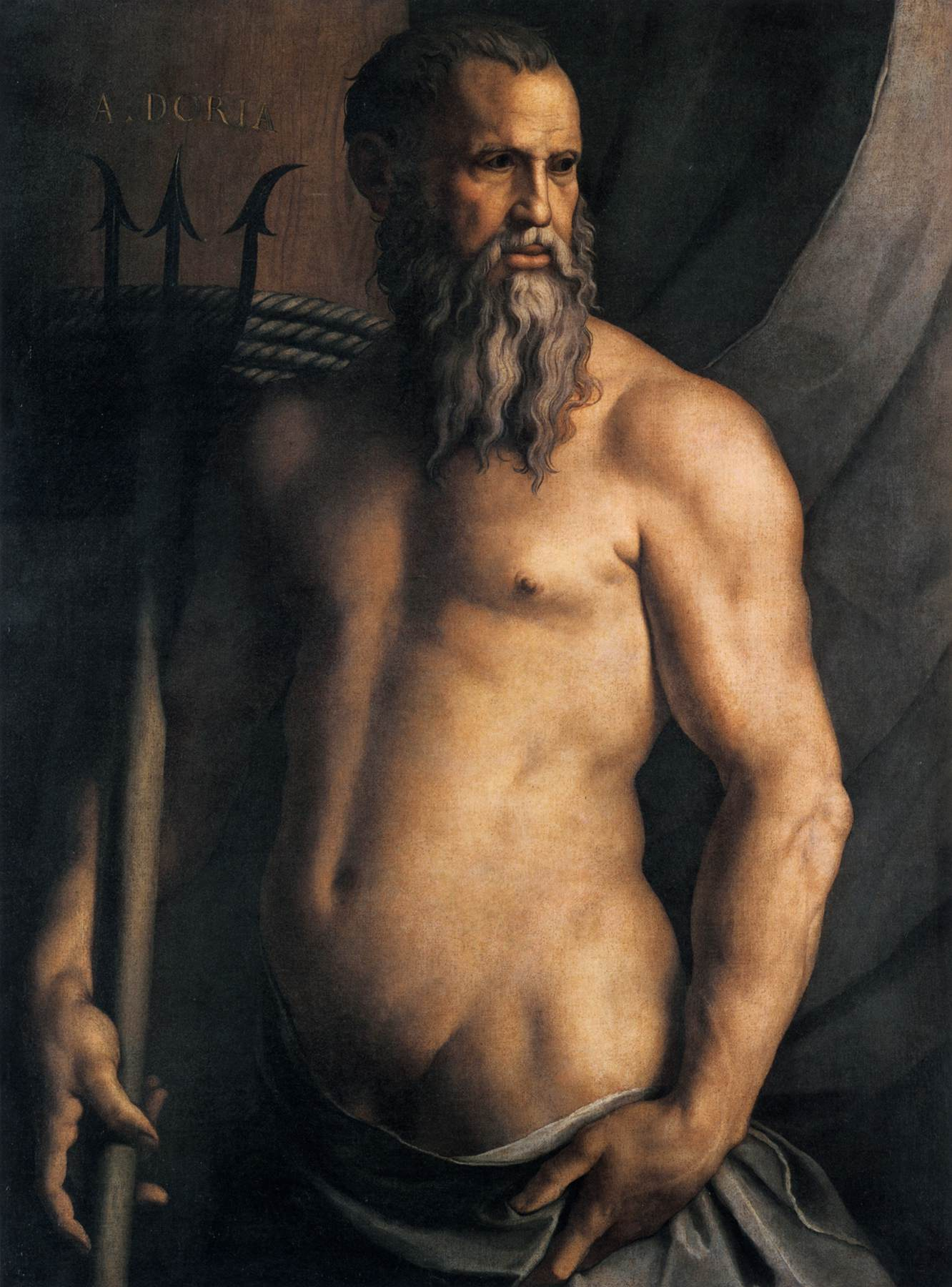
Portrait of Andrea Doria as Neptune by Agnolo Bronzino

Doria reformed the constitution in an aristocratic sense, eliminating the factions that had plagued the republic in the past centuries, and constituted a new oligarchic form of government composed of the city's principal aristocratic families, creating 28 Alberghi or "clans". The 28 Alberghi that formed this new ruling class included the Cybo, Doria, Fieschi, Giustiniani, Grimaldi, Imperiale, Pallavicino, and Spinola families.

He refused offers to take the lordship of Genoa and even the dogeship, but accepted the position of perpetual censor and the title of Father of the Fatherland (Liberator et Pater Patriae). He was still the de facto ruler of Genoa due to his economic and military power, and exercised undisputed influence in the councils of the republic until his death.

The title "censor" in this context was modelled on its meaning in the Roman Republic, i.e., a highly respected senior public official (see Roman censor), rather than its modern meaning having to do with censorship. He was given two palaces and many privileges. He established himself in his newly renovated villa in Fassolo, a Renaissance masterpiece known as Villa del Principe, in an area just outside the now demolished Porta di San Tomaso, where he resided until his death.

To protect the restored republic from future foreign attacks, Doria sponsored the construction of a new city wall, which was built in the third decade of the sixteenth century, on a design by the military engineer Giovanni Maria Olgiati. This new city wall actually followed the path of the previous 14th-century walls but replaced the old square-plan towers and walls with new curtain-shaped curtain walls and triangular bastions.

=== War against the Ottoman Empire ===
Actions against the Ottomans and Barbary pirates occupied again much of Doria's time. In 1529, Spanish captain Rodrigo de Portundo was defeated by Aydın Reis, lieutenant of Hayreddin Barbarossa. Finding out Barbarossa had Cádiz on his sights, Doria launched an attack on Cherchell, where Barbarossa was planning to supply his fleet. The raid went awry by the inexperience of Doria's freshly recruited troops, many of them French, who disbanded to sack the place and were abandoned to their luck, possibly by Barbarossa being near, but the operation succeeded in capturing a large part of the corsair's fleet in port and thwarting the campaign against Cádiz.

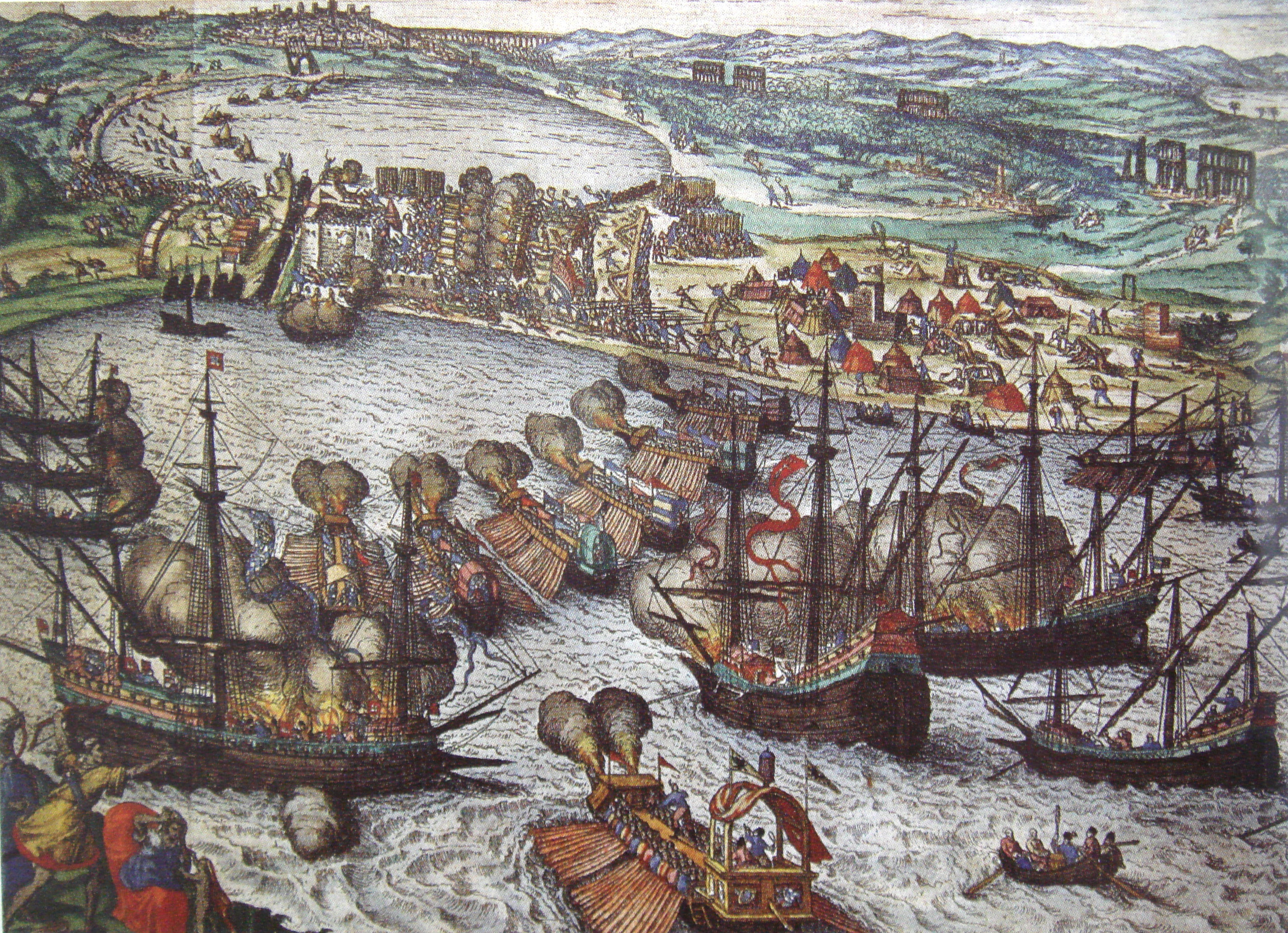
Conquest of Tunis.

In summer 1532, in response to the Turkish invasion of Hungary in April, Andrea attacked the Ottoman positions in the Aegean Sea with a Spanish-Genoese fleet of 48 galleys and 35 vessels. He headed to Morea, capturing Coron by way of a novel system of cannons and ladders in his masts to assault the coastal bulwark. Doria followed by taking and sacking Patras, destroying fortresses around the Gulf of Corinth. Doria returned to Genoa with booty of 60,000 ducats, having helped force the Ottomans to abort a possible conquest of Hungary.

The Ottomans attempted to recover Coron the following year with a 110-ship armada captained by Lütfi Pasha. Doria gathered 27 galleys and 30 ships in Messina and lifted the siege. Doria forced Lufti to withdraw despite having a much smaller fleet, outmaneuvering the Turks with his galleys despite the absence of wind having becalmed his other ships, and losing only three galleys in the battle. The relief of Coron would be called by Edmond Jurien de La Gravière one of the most skillful naval operations of the 16th century.

Barbarossa, now turned into grand admiral of the Ottoman Empire, launched his own offensive from Constantinople with 80 galleys and French support, sacking around Naples and Sicily. In 1535, Charles V called for the conquest of Tunis, which Barbarossa had just conquered and made his base. The fleet, with Doria sharing main command with Bazán the Elder, succeeded in taking Tunis and capturing Barbarossa's entire fleet, although the corsair managed to escape. Doria followed Barbarossa to Bona, which the Genoese stormed, but Barbarossa had fled and taken refuge in Algiers. Charles intended to continue the campaign taking Algiers next, but the approaching autumn weather prevented it.

=== Italian War of 1536–1538 ===
After the death of Francesco I Sforza in 1535, Charles V and Francis I clashed again for the succession of the Duchy of Milan. Doria was vital for the emperor to secure the friendship of the Médicis of Florence, favoring the ascension of Cosimo I. Doria and Bazán the Elder captured cities along the French Riviera, although stopping in Marseille. Shortly after, Barbarossa attacked and sacked the Balearic Islands with 27 galleasses he gathered in Algiers, leading Doria to give him chase unsuccessfully with 30 galleys, with orders of Charles V to bring the Turkish privateer dead or alive. In a shocking move, Francis allied with the Ottomans in 1536, installing Barbarossa with a Franco-Turkish fleet in Marseille, although the defenses built by Doria dissuaded them from trying to take Genoa.

In April 1537, Barbarossa appeared in front of Italy with 170 ships, but he had come to negotiate, and through a Spanish prisoner he proposed the emperor a possible desertion of the Ottoman Empire, citing his enmity with Lütfi and the political turmoil after the killing of Pargalı Ibrahim Pasha. Nothing came from it.

In July, due to the outbreak of the Ottoman–Venetian War, Doria sailed off at the head of 28 galleys from Messina. Doria retreated to Messina, where being unable to confront directly the 320-ship Ottoman armada, he was forced to hear how Barbarossa sacked Apulia and the Ottomans boasted they might be able to choose their own Pope some day. Doria harassed the Ottoman captured a fleet of 10 Ottoman supply ships, after which he defeated Ali Celebi and his 12 galleys in the Battle of Antipaxos. After the battle, he managed to involve the Venetians with the war, leading to the Ottomans to depart Apulia and start the siege of the Venetian colony of Corfu. After finally gathering 100 ships, Doria marched to relieve it, but the Ottomans had lifted it themselves.

In February 1538, Pope Paul III called for peace among the Christians and the formation of a Holy League (comprising the Papal States, Spain, the Holy Roman Empire, the Republic of Venice, and the Maltese Knights) against the Turks. Although Francis did not join, the Italian War came to its end with the Truce of Nice, and he accepted to break his alliance with the Ottomans.

=== Holy League ===
In 1538, being given command of the Holy League, Doria sailed off with 80 Venetian galleys, 36 from the Vatican States, 30 from Spain, as well as 50 naus, with the goal to seek the encounter with Barbarossa's fleet and defeat him. He tracked Barbarossa and his lieutenants, which included Sinan, Salah and Dragut or Turgut Reis, to the strait of Corinth, where he blockaded them. However, the Christian fleet was routed in unclear circumstances in the subsequent Battle of Preveza in September 1538. Venetian sources, which became the mainstream account, accused Doria of lack of initiative, which might have obeyed to Spain and Genoa being unwilling to commit themselves in defense of the politically distant Venice, not any less to the fact that Doria owned many of the ships employed. Imperial sources instead had Doria disobeyed by the Venetians out of political rivalry in a critical moment, forcing him to forfeit the battle.

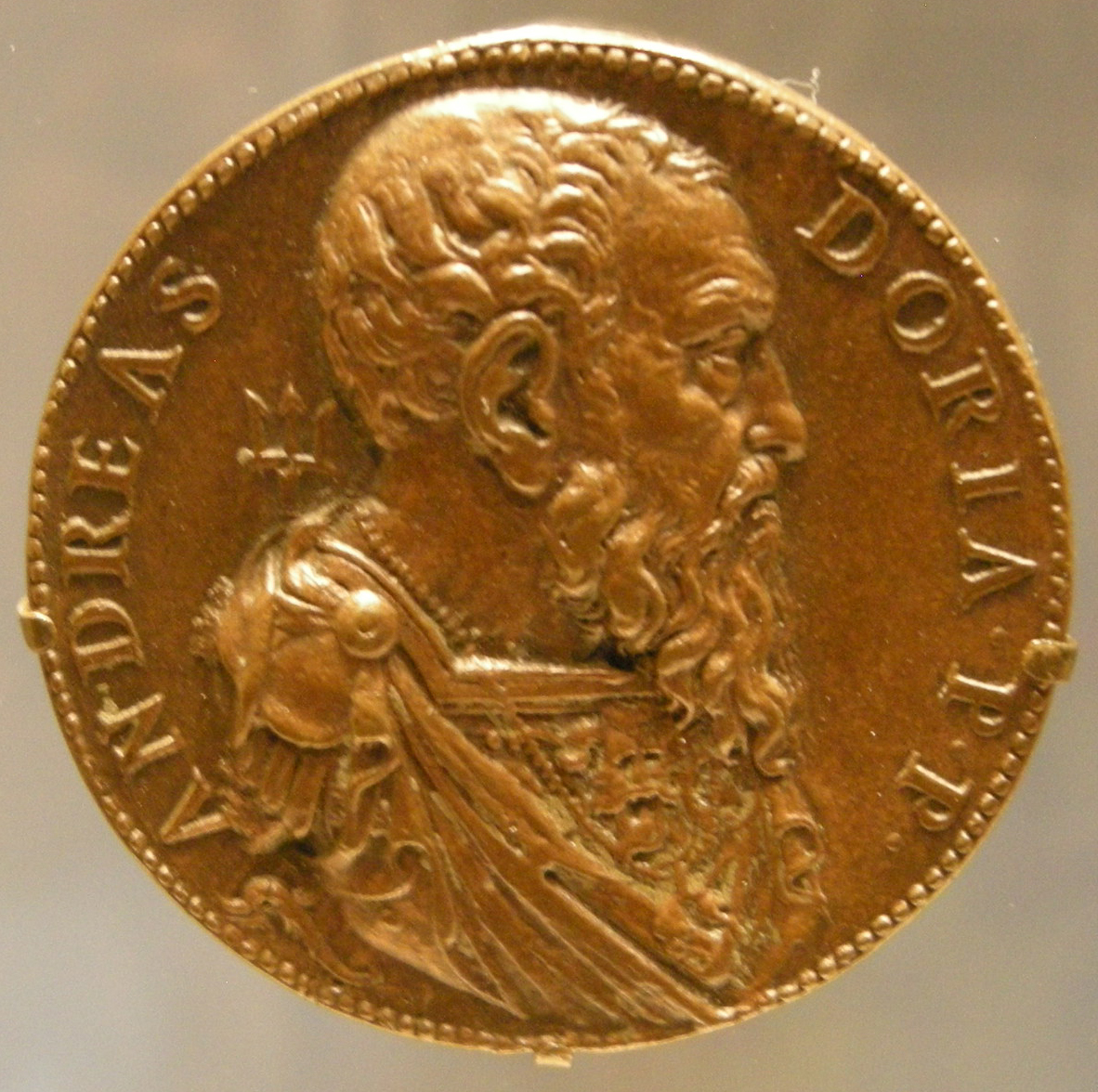
Doria medal. Leone Leoni, 1541.

This victory secured Turkish dominance over the eastern Mediterranean for the next 33 years, until the Battle of Lepanto in 1571. To compensate the defeat, they captured Castelnuovo, but Charles and Venice argued about who would keep the place, causing the practical disbandment of the Holy League. The garrison, initially conceived as the beachhead of an invasion of the Ottoman Balkans, was besieged and defeated by Barbarossa in the notorious Siege of Castelnuovo, although with enormous cost for the Turks.

The tactical experience of Preveza and the disloyalty of Venice made Doria rethink the imperial naval strategy, which often relied in large sailing ships and could not match the numbers of galleys and galley slaves put out by the Ottoman Empire. In October, seeking a better way to counter the Ottoman fleets, the Genoese proposed the emperor to complement their galley squads with a defensive fleet of caravels, zabras and small galleons which could be towed easily. However, the demands of the Italian Wars would force Doria and his partners to use generally any sailing or rowling vessels they could deploy.

In 1540, he launched a great operation to capture Dragut, the most eminent Turkish captain other than Babarossa, which was arrested by his nephew Giannettino Doria in a big victory in the Battle of Girolata. Andrea had him as a galley slave in his flagship during four years. Meanwhile, Andrea conquered multiple remaining Ottoman strongholds in Africa, including Monastir, Sousse and Hammamet. Around this time, a usual partner to Doria, Bernardino de Mendoza, achieved another victory over Ottoman privateers in the Battle of Alborán.

Andrea, Giannettino and Mendoza were recruited by Charles V in 1541 to launch an expedition to Algiers, a new attempt to capture Barbarossa. Doria tried to warn the emperor of the terrible timing of the move, as it was autumn and the Mediterranean weather was dangerous, but he was not heeded, and the Genoese reluctantly accepted to participate anyways. The result was a fiasco, as a storm disintegrated he imperial fleet, although the Dorias managed to secure the retreat of a large part of the fleet, taking a large effort to reorganize the other Genoese captains.

=== Italian War of 1542–1546 ===
In 1542, the now allied French and Ottomans sacked Nice, being chased away by Doria, who captured four ships. In May, Hayreddin Barbarossa attacked Reggio with 110 galleys, linking with the French fleet in Marseille, where command was shared with Francis of Bourbon. Again, Barbarossa and Bourbon conquered and sacked Nice, except by its citadel, and retreated with the arrival of Doria, who disembarked a land army led by Alfonso d'Avalos in Villefranche. Nice was recovered, while the Franco-Turkish fleet moved to Antibes. Meanwhile, Bazán the Elder destroyed the French Atlantic fleet in Muros Bay, where his son Álvaro de Bazán was present.

To great outrage of Christendom, in 1544 Doria freed Dragut in exchange for a rich rescue of 3,000 ducats paid by Barbarossa, who had also threatened with blockading Genoa. Doria was probably trying to gain the Ottomans' sympathy in the case one of his own relatives was captured, although he eventually repented his decision due to Dragut's many future successes. The Genoese then advised d'Avalos not to look for a direct battle against the French, but due to the bad state of their relationship, d'Avalos rebuked him and did it nonetheless, being defeated in Ceresole. Doria helped impeding the French from capitalizing on the chance, attacking the French positions in the coast.

After the Peace of Crépy between Francis and Charles in 1544, Doria hoped to end his days in quiet. However, his great wealth and power, as well as the arrogance of his nephew and heir Giannettino Doria, had made him many enemies, and in 1547 the Fieschi conspiracy to dislodge his family from power took place. Giannettino was killed, but the conspirators were defeated, and Doria showed great vindictiveness in punishing them, seizing many of their fiefs for himself. He was also implicated in the murder of Pier Luigi Farnese, duke of Parma and Piacenza, who had helped Fieschi. Imperial governor Ferrante Gonzaga suggested to hold a Spanish garrison in Genoa, but Doria vetoed it for the sake of the city's independence.

=== Later years ===
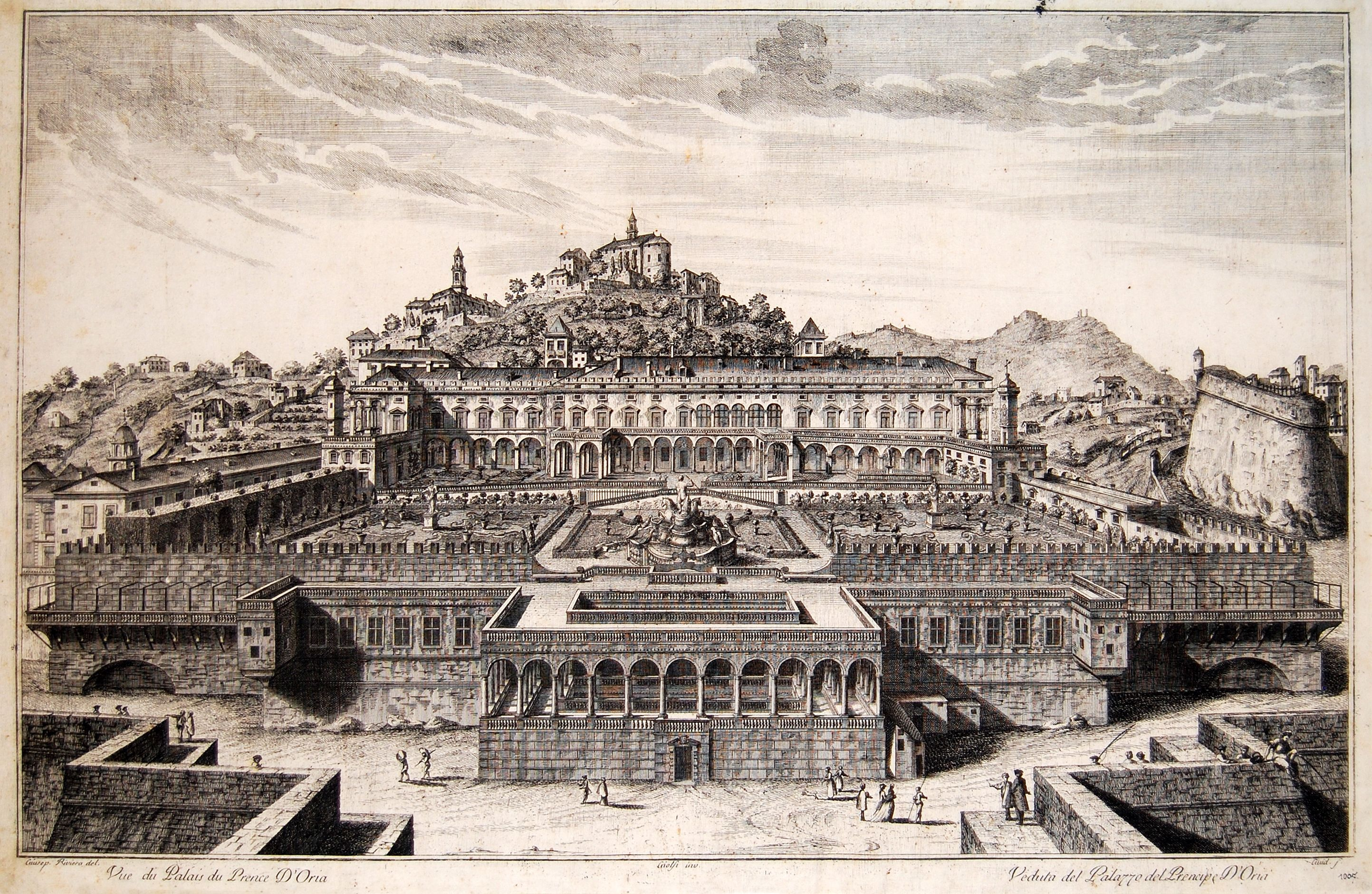
The Palace of Andrea Doria in Genoa during the 17th century.

Other conspiracies followed, of which the most important was that of Giulio Cybo (1548), but all failed. Although Doria was ambitious and harsh, he was a patriot and successfully opposed Emperor Charles's repeated attempts to have a citadel built in Genoa and garrisoned by Spaniards; neither blandishments nor threats could win him over to the scheme.

Nor did age lessen his energy, for in 1550, aged 84, he again put to sea to confront the Muslim armadas, as although Barbarossa had retired in 1545, Dragut and the Barbary pirates continued being a threat. Doria and Mendoza captured Mahdia, which Dragut had recently conquered as his headquarters. In the citadel they captured Hesar, a nephew to Dragut himself. Doria reinforced the garrison the next year, after which he found and chased Turgut and his 20 galleys to Djerba, blockading the privateer with few ships in an inlet. Dragut still escaped, digging a channel and dragging his ships overland to it. Doria had to be content with sacking Djerba.

In 1552, a 100-galley Ottoman fleet under the command of Dragut ambushed 40 Spanish and Genoese transport galleys commanded by Doria in the Ponza, although Doria managed to escape losing only seven of them. The war between France and the Empire having broken out once more, the French invaded Corsica, then administered by the Genoese Bank of Saint George. Doria was again summoned, and he spent two years (1553–1555) on the island fighting the French with varying fortune.

He returned to Genoa for good in 1555, now with Charles' successor Philip II. Being very old and infirm, Doria gave over the command of the galleys to his great-nephew Giovanni Andrea Doria, the son of Giannettino Doria, who conducted an expedition against Tripoli, but proved even more unsuccessful than his great-uncle had been at Algiers, barely escaping with his life after losing the Battle of Djerba against the Turkish fleet of Piyale Pasha and Dragut. Andrea Doria left his estates to Giovanni Andrea. The family of Doria-Pamphili-Landi is descended from Giovanni Andrea Doria and bears his title of Prince of Melfi.

== Legacy ==
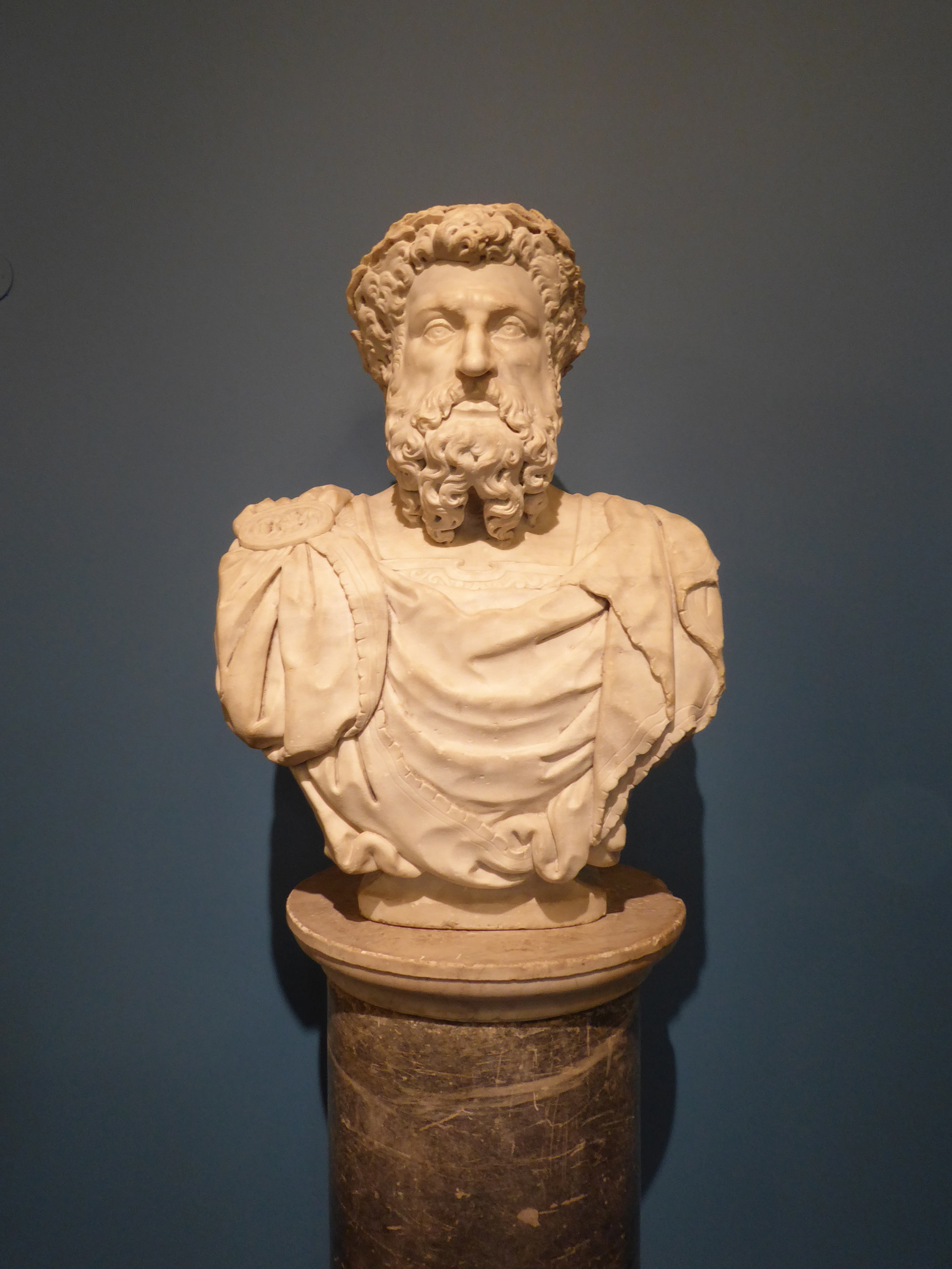
Bust of Doria. Palace of the Grand Dukes of Lithuania.

Historian Henry Kamen regarded Doria as the most distinguished admiral of his time, an opinion echoed by others. Military historian Spencer C. Tucker and others considered him the best Christian admiral of his time, with successes in both land and sea. According to Stanley Lane-Poole, "no name struck such terror into the hearts of the Turks." His leadership brought Genoa both fortune and independence within the Habsburg sphere of power, which won him widespread popularity in the city.

Doria was Charles V's main admiral along with Álvaro de Bazán the Elder and Bernardino de Mendoza. The three played roles in the establishment of the Spanish treasure fleet system, with Doria and Bazán the Elder additionally becoming the main shipbuilders of Charles' navies. Doria also participated in the evolution of amphibious warfare led by Spanish and Italians, based in direct assaults with marine infantry and artillery. Despite his mixed success against the still dominant Ottoman navy, he largely succeeded in keeping the Imperial naval lines open between Spain and Italy.

He was only rivaled by his enemy Barbarossa, whose relationship with Hamilton Currey described as, "with them the ebb and flow of conquest and defeat alternated... great as was the one, it cannot be said that he was greater than the other". It has been speculated the two maintained secret agreements to let each other escape, as Barbarossa was in usual negotiations with Charles V to potentially desert to imperial service. Doria is sometimes considered a privateer, not unlike Barbarossa himself, as he used his private fleet to increase his own wealth.

Doria's international reputation suffered with the fiasco of Preveza against Barbarossa. Spanish-Imperial sources accused the Venetians of betraying Doria, while the Venetians accused Doria of sabotaging the battle, with the latter version becoming predominant in historiography due to its quickness and vigor. Venetians colored Doria as a strong admiral, but also indecisive in his tactics and adverse to risk the fleets he owned, which was echoed by even Spanish chroniclers like Prudencio de Sandoval. Despite this, he retained the favor of Charles V and Philip II to his death. According to R. C. Anderson, "opinions as to his real worth have varied and will continue to vary, but there can be no doubt as to the position which he held among his contemporaries."

Several ships were named in his honour since.

- Two United States Navy ships named USS Andrew Doria (1775 and 1908).
- The Italian ironclad Andrea Doria, completed in 1891, which served in the late 19th and early 20th century, was decommissioned in 1911, and served as the floating battery GR104 during World War I before being scrapped in 1929.
- The Italian battleship Andrea Doria, completed in 1916, which served in both World War I and World War II and was decommissioned in 1956.
- The Italian passenger liner SS Andrea Doria, which was launched in 1951, had her maiden voyage in 1953 and sank following a collision in 1956.
- The Italian missile cruiser Andrea Doria, built in 1964 and decommissioned in 1991.
- The Italian Horizon-class destroyer Andrea Doria, commissioned in 2007.

A painted sheepskin for The Magnificent and Excellent Andrea Doria hangs at The Breakers in Newport, Rhode Island, US.

== See also ==
- Genoa
- Genoese Navy
- Republic of Genoa
- Villa del Principe
- Doria (family)

== Bibliography ==
- Abercrombie, Gordon Allyson (2024). The Hospitaller Knights of Saint John, 1523-1565. Pen and Sword.
- Anderson, Roger Charles (1952). Naval wars in the Levant, 1559-1853. Princeton University Press.
- Cadenas y Vicent, Vicente (1977). El Protectorado de Carlos V en Génova: la "condotta" de Andrea Doria. Hidalguía. ISBN 9788400036515.
- Campodonico, Pierangelo (1997). Andrea Doria. Tormena.
- Currey, Hamilton (2018). Sea Wolves of the Mediterranean. Ozymandias Press. ISBN 9781531280314.
- Concepción, Gerónimo (1690). Emporio de el orbe: Cadiz illustrada, investigacion de sus antiguas grandezas' discurrida en concurso de general imperio de Espana.
- Fernández Duro, Cesáreo (1895). Armada Española desde la unión de los reinos de Castilla y Aragón. I. Instituto de Historia y Cultura Naval.
- Fissel, Mark (2022). The Military Revolution and Revolutions in Military Affairs. De Gruyter. ISBN 9783110657593.
- Granata, Mario (1955). L'ammiraglio della Superba.
- Guglielmotti, Alberto (1876). La guerra del pirati e la marina pontificia: dal 1500 al 1560. Firenze.
- Jamieson, Alan G. (2013). Lords of the Sea: A History of the Barbary Corsairs. Reaktion Books. ISBN 9781861899460.
- Kamen, Henry (2003). Who's Who in Europe 1450-1750. Taylor & Francis. ISBN 9781134755479.
- Keblusek, Marika; Noldus, Badeloch Vera (2011). Double Agents: Cultural and Political Brokerage in Early Modern Europe. Brill. ISBN 9789004215078.
- Lane-Pool, Stanley (1890). The Barbary Corsairs. T. Fisher Unwin.
- Lingua, Paolo (2006). Andrea Doria.
- Sandoval, Prudencio (1614). Historia de la Vida y hechos del emperador Carlos V.
- Shaw, Christina (2014). Barons and Castellans: The Military Nobility of Renaissance Italy. Brill. ISBN 9789004282766.
- Stampa Piñeiro, Leopoldo (2020). Los galeones de las especias: España y las Molucas. EDAF. ISBN 9788441440395.
- Thevet, André (2009). Portraits from the French Renaissance and the Wars of Religion. Penn State University Press. ISBN 9780271090719.
- Tucker, Spencer C. (2009). A Global Chronology of Conflict: From the Ancient World to the Modern Middle East vol. 2. ABC-CLIO. ISBN 9781851096725.
