= Antonio Doria (condottiere) =

16th-century Genoese admiral

- Antonio Doria. Luca Cambiaso.
- Born: 1495; Republic of Genoa
- Died: 1577 (aged 81–82); Naples
- Military career
- Allegiance: Kingdom of France; Papal States; Spanish Empire; Holy Roman Empire
- Branch: Navy
- Service years: 1526-1577
- Rank: Admiral
- Unit: Spanish armada
- Awards: Order of the Golden Fleece

Antonio Doria (1495-1577), marquis of Santo Stefano d'Aveto, was a Genoese admiral, general and statesman. He was the cousin and rival of Andrea Doria, and like him, he became a successful admiral for Holy Roman Emperor Charles V. He later served King of Spain Philip II, and built the Palazzo Doria Spinola.

== Early life ==
He was born in Genoa in 1495, the son of Battista and Isottina Doria. He possibly worked in Spain in his youth, in the service of a merchant from the Spinola family based in Toledo, but by 1526 he was already commanding two galleys for the fleet of his cousin Andrea. He always maintained a close relationship with him, although reluctantly so, and followed him in his successive service to Pope Clement VII and King Francis I of France during the War of the League of Cognac.

== In the service of France ==
He took part in the Battle of Capo d'Orso, where Filippino Doria defeated the Spanish-Imperial fleet of Charles V. When Doria abandoned the French to switch to Charles's side in 1528, Antonio initially disagreed and remained with the French fleet, now commanded by Antoine de La Rochefoucauld, settling in Marseille with his brother Melchiorre Doria. However, his relationship with the French grew increasingly contentious and difficult; rumors began to circulate that he would follow his cousin into Spanish service, a move that eventually materialized in 1531. His departure was tumultuous, and he ended up taking two French galleys with him, claiming they were payment for substantial arrears in his wages. For years, the French persisted in trying to win back his services, offering him "the moon and stars" as claimed back then, but Antonio remained in the Emperor's service until his death.

== In the service of Spain ==
=== Charles V's reign ===
He initially joined the Papal Navy, allied at the time with the Spanish, and repeatedly commanded a squadron of galleys for his cousin, achieving successes such as the capture and relief of Coron in the face of the fearsome Ottoman navy. He entered Spanish service in 1533 with the Pope's permission, with his first assignment being the defense of the Neapolitan coast. The following year, he patrolled near Messina to keep the Turk Hayreddin Barbarossa at bay, and the year after that, he took part in the Tunis campaign, which eliminated the new Ottoman naval base in Barbary. With the resumption of the Italian Wars in 1536, he participated in attacks in Provence, such as the failed siege of Marseille, but successfully relieved Genoa from the French. In 1537, he again contributed to a victory against the Turks in the Battle of Antipaxos.

He took part in the Holy League of 1538, during which internal infighting within the League squandered the opportunity to defeat the Ottomans at the Battle of Preveza. Antonio was deeply disappointed by the defeat and, the following year, wrote a widely circulated treatise titled Discorso sopra le cose turchesche per via di mare ("Discourse on Turkish Affairs at Sea"). Dedicated to the Spanish ambassador Diego Hurtado de Mendoza, the work urged Christian nations to set aside their differences, expand their navies, and form a new league of at least 250 galleys to defeat the Turks.

In 1542, he assisted in the siege of Perpignan, then under Spanish control, but his relationship with Andrea soured again during this period, possibly because Antonio began to feel his career was stagnating in the shadow of his prestigious cousin's. Antonio even considered selling his ships and retiring completely from naval affairs, though he never actually did so, and shortly thereafter vigorously sought out the Turkish admiral Dragut, at times alongside García de Toledo, without success. Following the Fieschi conspiracy against the Dorias in 1547, in which Andrea's heir Giannettino was assassinated, Antonio received the marquisate of Santo Stefano d'Aveto, confiscated from the rival family, perhaps as a form of compensation on Andrea's part. After helping to suppress the last of the conspirators, he traveled to Naples, where he assisted Viceroy Pedro de Toledo and used a monetary grant from Charles V to purchase the fief of Ginosa in Apulia.

By 1548, his disagreements with Andrea persisted, this time because advocated for a Spanish garrison within Genoa, a measure Andrea had always opposed despite his own staunch support for Spain. Antonio also sought higher-ranking appointments for himself, but these requests went unheeded. By the end of the year, the rift between the two men was profound, and through the intercession of Ferrante Gonzaga and the Duke of Alba, he was permanently stationed in Naples by Charles V. Nevertheless, the exigencies of the wars occasionally forced him to join forces with his cousin for naval operations, such as in 1550, when he fought alongside him during the capture of Mahdia. Later, in 1551, he helped guard the Sicilian coast with Berenguer de Requesens and a squadron of fifteen galleys, though a violent storm wrecked more than half the fleet near Malta.

In 1553, surprisingly, he left the Mediterranean for the Habsburg Netherlands, fighting the French from Brussels as an aide to Emmanuel Philibert of Savoy alongside Giovanni Battista Castaldo. In recognition of his service during 1553–1554 and his long career, Charles appointed him a knight of the Order of the Golden Fleece in 1555. During this period, he acted as a liaison between the Netherlands and Genoa, where he reunited with Andrea and Andrea's new heir, Giovanni Andrea Doria, and met another Spanish admiral, Juan de Mendoza y Carrillo. Ironically, despite various enmities, Antonio found himself part of a triumvirate with Giovanni Andrea and the Spanish ambassador, Gómez Suárez de Figueroa, working to keep the republic within the Spanish sphere of influence.

=== Philip II's reign ===
The Battle of Djerba in 1560 marked a turning point. Antonio had sent two of his sons, Scipione and Giovanni Battista, to command his squadron, but the campaign was a major failure (he lost three of his galleys, and Giovanni was even captured by the Turks, though he later managed to escape) and coincided with the death of Andrea Doria. It seemed inevitable that a successor would be sought for both the command of the Spanish fleets and a role in Genoese politics, and Antonio was among the top candidates, but the position ultimately went to Giovanni Andrea. Despite this, Antonio continued to serve with great success in the war against the Turks. Although skeptical of Álvaro de Bazán's plan, he took part in the imperial relief effort during the Great Siege of Malta, a achieving great victory.

In 1566, he requested permission from Philip II to retire, although the monarch was reluctant to let him go and required the counsel of García de Toledo to agree to the request. The elderly Genoese commander devoted himself to writing and to building harbor defenses while handing command to his son Cesare, who participated in the Holy League of 1571, as did Giovanni Andrea. This led to the great victory at the Battle of Lepanto in 1571, where Antonio's dream was realized and Ottoman naval power was stunted forever. Surprisingly, because Pope Pius V was disappointed with Giovanni Andrea's performance as deputy to John of Austria, Antonio was called upon to replace him, bringing the Genoese commander out of retirement for the following year's campaign. After the failed siege of Navarino, the Holy League was dissolved, though Antonio remained an advisor to Don John.

In 1576, a political struggle broke out in Genoa. Antonio saw his sons Lelio and Cesare die in the conflict, although the situation was stabilized with the help of John of Austria and Giovanni Andrea. Antonio died the following year, in January 1577, at the advanced age of 82, leaving a vast fortune to his remaining descendants.
