= Prudencio de Sandoval =

Spanish historian and Benedictine monk

Fray Prudencio de Sandoval
- Bishop of Pamplona
- Church: Catholic Church
- Diocese: Diocese of Pamplona
- In office: 1612–1620
- Other post: Bishop of Tuy (1608–1612)

Personal details
- Born: 1553 Valladolid, Spain
- Died: 1620 (aged 66–67) Pamplona, Spain
- Denomination: Roman Catholic
- Occupation: Historian, Benedictine monk

Fray Prudencio de Sandoval (1553–1620) was a Spanish historian and Benedictine monk, the Bishop of Tuy from 1608 to 1612 and Bishop of Pamplona thereafter until his death.

De Sandoval was born in Valladolid. He continued the chronicle begun by Florián de Ocampo and Ambrosio de Morales, and rather uncritically compiled a large collection of documents, making much use of Guevara y Mejía. His Historia de la vida y hechos del emperador Carlos V is a source of fundamental importance for the reign of Charles V, Holy Roman Emperor. His Historia de los reyes de Castilla y León or Historia de los cinco reyes (Pamplona: 1615) includes some documentary and epigraphic material now lost. He died in Pamplona, and his last work, Crónica del ínclito emperador de España don Alonso VII (1660), was published posthumously.
