= Gerónimo de la Concepción =

Gerónimo de la Concepción (Cádiz, 1642 - Córdoba, 1698) was a Spanish Carmelite and writer.

== Works ==
- Emporio del Orbe, Cádiz ilustrada, the only one being published.

There are also other works that were not published:

- Catálogo de los Arzobispos de Sevilla (incomplete).
- Dos discursos por la primacía de la santa Metropolitana y Patriarcal Iglesia de Sevilla.
- Tres discursos sobre el templo mayor de Sevilla, su origen, progresos y descripción.
