= Tüllüce Islet =

Island in Turkey

Tüllüce Islet is an Aegean island of Turkey.

The island faces the town of Turgutreis in Bodrum ilçe (district) of Muğla Province at 36°59′4″N 27°13′57″E The distance to the nearest point on the mainland (Anatolia) is about 2 kilometres (1.2 mi). Its area is about 5 hectares (12 acres). The sea around the island is one of the popular diving area.
