= Siege of Gafsa (1550–1551) =

1550–1551 Siege

- Part of Shabiyan revolution
Date	between December 1550 and January 1551
Location	Gafsa, Tunisia
Result	Ottoman failure

Belligerents
Emirate of Shabiya	Ottoman Empire

Commanders and leaders
Unknown	(Ottoman Empire) Dragut

Strength
	600 turkish soldiers 2,000 Moors

Casualties and losses
	200 turkish soldiers killed

The Siege of Gafsa took place between December 1550 and January 1551, when Ottoman forces led by Dragut attempted to capture the town of Gafsa, in present-day Tunisia. The operation was part of the wider conflict between the Ottoman authorities in Tunisia and the Shabbiyya movement. Despite deploying their troops, the Ottomans failed to capture the town, and Dragut withdrew without achieving his objective.

== Background ==
For more than 40 years, Ifriqiya was the scene of a conflict involving the Ottoman Empire and the Spanish Empire, as well as the Hafsid dynasty and the Shabbiyya dynasty. The Ottomans undertook several military conquests, including the capture of Tripoli in 1551. It was in this context that Dragut appeared before the gates of Gafsa in 1551.

== Siege ==
On 26 December 1550, Dragut departed from Gabès with 600 Turkish soldiers, an equal number of camels, numerous horses, and several artillery pieces. He stopped at El Hamma, where he was joined by 400 Berber fighters. He remained encamped there for eight days before resuming his march towards Gafsa.

The following day, with the support of more than 2,000 Berber fighters who had joined his forces, Dragut bombarded Gafsa with his artillery. During a sortie, the Shabbiyya forces inflicted heavy casualties on the Ottoman troops, killing 25 soldiers and wounding many others. Following a mutiny by the Christian soldiers serving in his army, which prevented him from taking control of the remaining artillery, Dragut withdrew from Gafsa.

== Aftermath ==
In January 1551, following his defeat at Gafsa, Dragut withdrew to Djerba, where he established a stronghold. On 16 August of the same year, he captured Tripoli. This strengthened his position in the region and eventually enabled him, on 20 December 1556, to recapture Gafsa from the Shabbiyya, whose influence in the region had by then declined.

== Sources ==
- Allan Ogot, Bethwell (1992). Africa from the Sixteenth to the Eighteenth Century (PDF). UNESCO.
- Sanchez de Valdés, Pero; Bobo, Guillermo; de Tramuto, César; de Vega, Hernando; Corso, Susino (2021). Asturiano de Llanes: Avisos sobre Dragut (1551) (PDF) (in Spanish). CEDCS.
- Braudel, Fernand (1928). Les Espagnols et l’Afrique du Nord de 1492 à 1577 (PDF) (in French). Revue africaine.
