= Our Lady of the Sacred Heart Parish Church =

Church of Sacro Cuor
- The Parish church of Our Lady of the Sacred Heart of Jesus
- Il-Knisja Parrokjali tal-Madonna tas-Sacro Cuor
- Church of Sacro Cuor
- 35°54′38.5″N 14°30′02.9″E
- Location: Sliema, Malta
- Denomination: Roman Catholic

History
- Status: Active
- Founded: 1877
- Founder: Paul Vella

Architecture
- Functional status: Parish church
- Years built: 1877–1881

Administration
- Archdiocese: Malta
- Parish: Sliema

Clergy
- Rector: Alexander Borg

The Sanctuary of Our Lady of the Sacred Heart in Sliema, Malta was founded in 1877, and has been a parish church since 1918.

== History ==
The church was built on the initiative of Fr. Paul Vella, between 1877–1881, and six months after its completion in November 1881 it was handed over to the Maltese Province of the Friars Minor. The provincial superior at the time was Fr. Anton M. Cesal, who appointed Fr. Aegidius Portelli as its rector.

In 1930 the church was enlarged to handle the increased population. It was built in a Roman-Ionic style, with gilded sculptures and decorative paintings. The dome is decorated with paintings of different Franciscan saints, and the ceiling depicts joyful episodes from the life of the Virgin Mary. The altar has five paintings by the Maltese artist Giuseppe Calì, one of which is his masterpiece representing St Gerome half naked in the grotto in Bethlehem. The statue of Our Lady of the Sacred Heart was made in 1879 by the Maltese artist Girolamo Darmanin and brought into the church on 26 June 1881, the day the church was consecrated and opened for worship.

During World War II, the church was heavily damaged and the Franciscan friary was completely destroyed. A Franciscan Father and 22 others died buried under the rubble. Through the years, Devotion to Our Lady of the Sacred Heart spread rapidly throughout Malta. A perpetual novena is held every Wednesday in honour of the Virgin Mary. The feast day is celebrated on the first Sunday of July, with liturgical services, a procession of the statue around the decorated streets of the parish, outdoor festivities and fireworks.

== See also ==
- Culture of Malta
- History of Malta
- List of Churches in Malta
- Religion in Malta
