= Dragut =

Ottoman corsair, naval commander, and governor (1485–1565)

- Turgut Reis, "Torghoud"
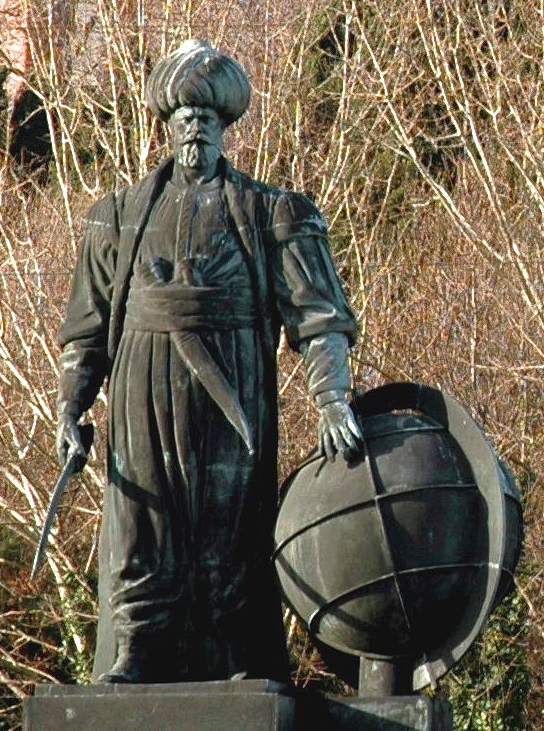
- Monument to Turgut Reis in Istanbul depicted with his palm resting on globe.
- Born: 1485; Karatoprak, Ottoman Empire (modern Turgutreis, Turkey)
- Died: 23 June 1565 (aged 79–80); Malta (Siege of Malta)
- Burial place: Sidi Darghut Mosque, Tripoli, Libya
- Military career
- Allegiance: Ottoman Empire
- Branch: Ottoman Navy
- Service years: c. 1500–1565
- Rank: Admiral, Governor-general, Pasha
- Nicknames: Dragut Rais, Darghouth; Arabic: درغوث; Italian: Dragut
- Commands: Commander-in-Chief of Ottoman Naval Forces in the Mediterranean (Beylerbey)
- Conflicts: Battle of Preveza (1538); Sack of Cullera (1550); Battle of Girolata (1540) (POW); Invasion of Gozo (1551); Siege of Tripoli (1551); Battle of Ponza (1552); Invasion of Corsica (1553); Sack of Vieste (1554); Sack of Bastia (1555); Raid of the Balearic islands (1558); Battle of Djerba (1560); Battle of Lipari (1561); Sack of Granada (1563); Sieges of Oran and Mers El Kébir (1563); Great Siege of Malta (1565) †

Dragut (Turkish: Turgut Reis; 1485 – 23 June 1565) was an Ottoman corsair, naval commander, governor, and noble. Under his command, the Ottoman Empire's maritime power was extended across North Africa. Recognized for his military genius, and as being among "the most dangerous" of corsairs, Dragut has been referred to as "the greatest pirate warrior of all time", "undoubtedly the most able of all the Turkish leaders", and "the uncrowned king of the Mediterranean". He was nicknamed "the Drawn Sword of Islam". He was described by a French admiral as "a living chart of the Mediterranean, skillful enough on land to be compared to the finest generals of the time" and that "no one was more worthy than he to bear the name of king". Hayreddin Barbarossa, who was his mentor, stated that Dragut was ahead of him "both in fishing and bravery".

In addition to serving as Admiral and Corsair in the Ottoman Empire's Navy under Suleiman the Magnificent, Dragut was also appointed Bey of Algiers and Djerba, Beylerbey of the Mediterranean, as well as Bey, and subsequently Pasha, of Tripoli. While serving as Pasha of Tripoli, Dragut built up and adorned the city, making it one of the most impressive to behold along the entire North African coast.

== Origin and early career ==
Dragut was born around 1487 in Karatoprak (known today as Turgutreis in his honour) near Bodrum, on the Aegean coast of Asia Minor, in the sub-district called Saravalos in the western tip of Bodrum peninsula; or probably in the Karabağ village on the Aegean coast of Asia Minor. His father was a farmer named Velî. His family were either Greek Christians or Turkish Muslims.

At the age of 12 he was noticed by an Ottoman army commander for his extraordinary talent in using spears and arrows and was recruited by him. Under his support, the young Turgut became a skilled sailor, an outstanding gunner, and was trained as a cannoneer and master of siege artillery, a skill which would play an important role in Turgut's future success and reputation as a superb naval tactician. The Ottoman Turkish governor eventually carried Turgut off to Egypt in 1517, where he participated in the Ottoman conquest of Egypt as a cannoneer. He further improved his skills in this field during his presence in Cairo. Following the death of his master, Turgut went to Alexandria and began his career as a sailor after joining the fleet of Sinan Pasha. He immediately became one of the favourite crewmen of the famous corsair due to his success in hitting enemy vessels with cannons. Turgut soon mastered the skills of seamanship and became the captain of a brigantine, while given 1/4 of its ownership. After several successful campaigns, he became the sole owner of the brigantine. Turgut later became the captain and owner of a galiot, and arming it with the most advanced cannons of that period, he started to operate in the Eastern Mediterranean, especially targeting the shipping routes between Venice and the Aegean islands belonging to the Republica Serenissima.

In 1520, he joined the fleet of Hayreddin Barbarossa, who would become his protector and best friend. Turgut was soon promoted to the rank of Chief Lieutenant, by Barbarossa, and was given command of 12 galiot-class naval vessels. In 1526, Turgut Reis captured the fortress of Capo Passero in Sicily. Between 1526 and 1533 he landed several times at the ports of the Kingdom of Sicily and the Kingdom of Naples, while intercepting the ships which sailed between Spain and Italy, capturing many of them.

In May 1533, commanding four fustas and 18 barques, Turgut Reis captured two Venetian galleys near the island of Aegina. In June and July 1538 he accompanied Barbarossa on his pursuit of Andrea Doria in the Adriatic Sea, while capturing several fortresses on the coasts of Albania as well as the Gulf of Preveza and the island of Lefkada. In August 1538 Turgut Reis captured Candia in Crete as well as several other Venetian possessions in the Aegean Sea.

== Battle of Preveza ==
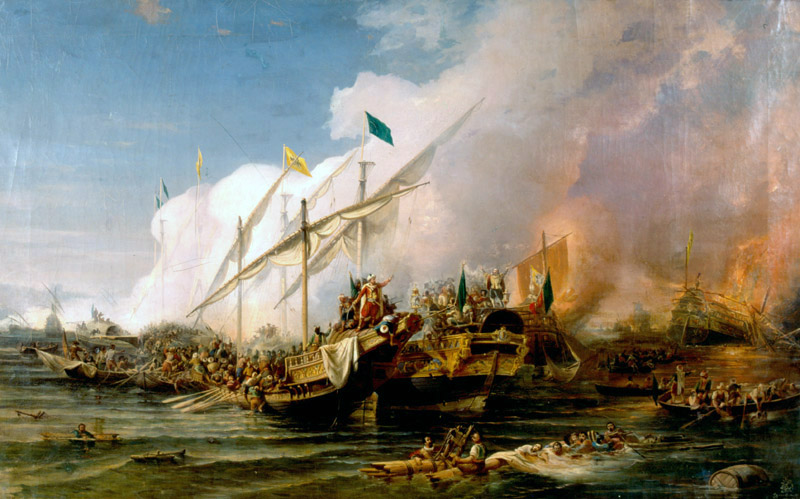
Ottoman forces, including Dragut, defeat the fleet of the Holy League of Charles V, who were commanded by Andrea Doria, at the Battle of Preveza (1538)

In September 1538, at the Battle of Preveza, Turgut Reis, with 20 galleys and 10 galiots, commanded the center-rear wing of the Ottoman fleet which defeated the Holy League, a short-lived Christian alliance consisting of the Knights of Malta, the Papal States, Venice, Spain, Naples and Sicily, who were then under the command of Andrea Doria.

Despite the Holy League's vastly superior numbers of ships, 302, and soldiers, 60,000, Dragut and the Ottoman fleet dealt the Christian alliance a decisive defeat, with only 112 ships, and 12,000 soldiers. During the battle, with two of his galiots, Dragut captured the Papal galley under the command of Giambattista Dovizi, the knight who was also the abbot of Bibbiena, taking him and his crew as prisoners.

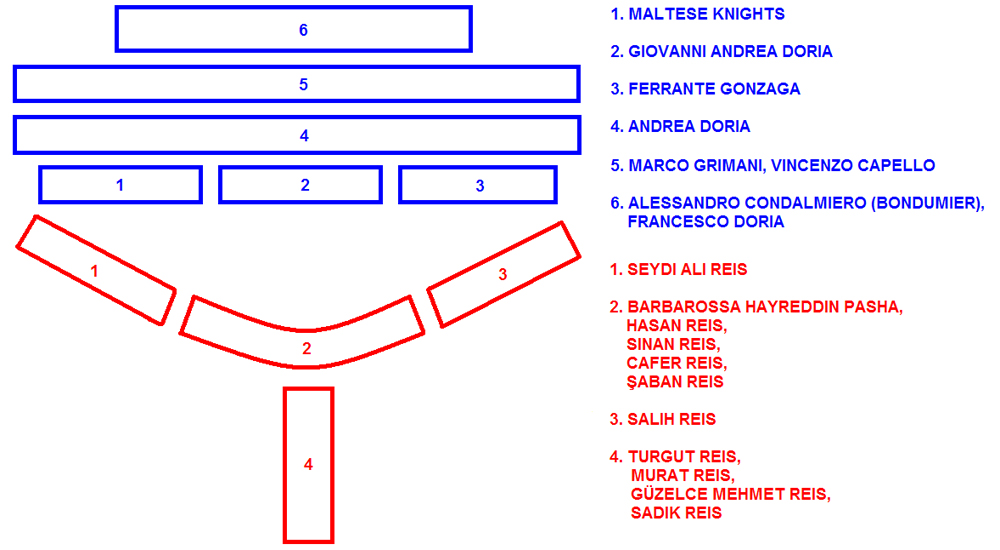
Turgut Reis commanded the center-rear wing of the Turkish fleet at the naval Battle of Preveza in 1538

In 1539, commanding 36 galleys and galiots, Turgut Reis recaptured Castelnuovo from the Venetians, who had taken the city back from the Ottomans. During the combat he sank two Venetian galleys and captured three others. Still in 1539, while landing on Corfu, he encountered 12 Venetian galleys under the command of Francesco Pasqualigo and captured the galley of Antonio da Canal. He later landed at Crete and fought against the Venetian cavalry forces under the command of Antonio Calbo.

== Governor of Djerba ==
Dragut was Governor of Djerba

Later that year, when Sinan Pasha, the Governor of Djerba, was appointed by Suleiman the Magnificent as the new Commander-in-Chief of the Ottoman Red Sea Fleet based in Suez, Turgut Reis was appointed as his successor and became the Governor of Djerba.

In early 1540 Turgut Reis captured several Genoese ships off the coast of Santa Margherita Ligure. In April 1540, commanding two galleys and 13 galiots, he landed at Gozo and sacked the island. He later landed at Pantelleria and raided the coasts of Sicily and Spain with a force of 25 ships, inflicting so much damage that Andrea Doria was ordered by Charles V to chase him with a force of 81 galleys. From there, Turgut Reis sailed to the Tyrrhenian Sea and bombarded the southern ports of Corsica, most notably Palasca. He later captured and sacked the nearby island of Capraia.

== Captivity and freedom ==
Turgut Reis later sailed back towards Corsica and docked his ships at Girolata on the western shores of the island. Taken by surprise in the Battle of Girolata while repairing his ships, Turgut Reis and his men were attacked by the combined forces of Giannettino Doria (Andrea Doria's nephew), Giorgio Doria and Gentile Virginio Orsini. Turgut Reis was captured and was forced to work as a galley slave in the ship of Giannettino Doria for nearly four years before being imprisoned in Genoa. Barbarossa offered to pay ransom for his release but it was rejected.

In 1544, when Barbarossa was returning from France with 210 ships sent by Sultan Suleiman to assist King Francis I in a Franco-Ottoman alliance against Spain, he appeared before Genoa, laying siege to the city and forcing the Genoese to negotiate for the release of Turgut Reis. Barbarossa was invited by Andrea Doria to discuss the issue in his palace at Fassolo, and the two admirals reached an agreement for the release of Turgut Reis in exchange for 3,500 gold ducats.

Barbarossa gave Turgut his spare flagship and the command of several other vessels, and in that same year Turgut Reis landed at Bonifacio in Corsica and captured the city, inflicting particular damage to Genoese interests. Still in 1544 he assaulted the island of Gozo in Malta and fought against the forces of knight Giovanni Ximenes while capturing several Maltese ships which were bringing precious cargo from Sicily. In June 1545 he raided the coasts of Sicily and bombarded several ports on the Tyrrhenian Sea. In July he ravaged the island of Capraia and landed at the coasts of Liguria and the Italian Riviera with a force of 15 galleys and fustas. He sacked Monterosso and Corniglia, and later landed at Manarola and Riomaggiore.

In the following days he landed at the Gulf of La Spezia and captured Rapallo, Pegli and Levanto. In 1546 he captured Mahdia, Sfax, Sousse and Al-Munastir in Tunisia, afterwards using Mahdia as a base to assault the Knights of St. John in Malta. In April 1546 he raided the coasts of Liguria. In May, still in Liguria, he captured Laigueglia, a province of Savona, with a force of 1000 men. He later captured Andora and took the podestà of the town as a prisoner. There he and his troops rested for a brief period, before resuming their assault on the Italian Riviera and landing at San Lorenzo al Mare. He also destroyed the village of Civezza. From there he once again sailed towards Malta and laid siege to the island of Gozo.

In June 1546 Andrea Doria was appointed by Emperor Charles V to force Turgut Reis away from Malta, and Doria based his forces at the island of Favignana. The two admirals, however, did not meet up, as Turgut Reis had sailed to Toulon in August 1546, staying there for several months and letting his men have some rest in the security of a French port.

== Commander-in-chief of Ottoman naval forces in the Mediterranean ==
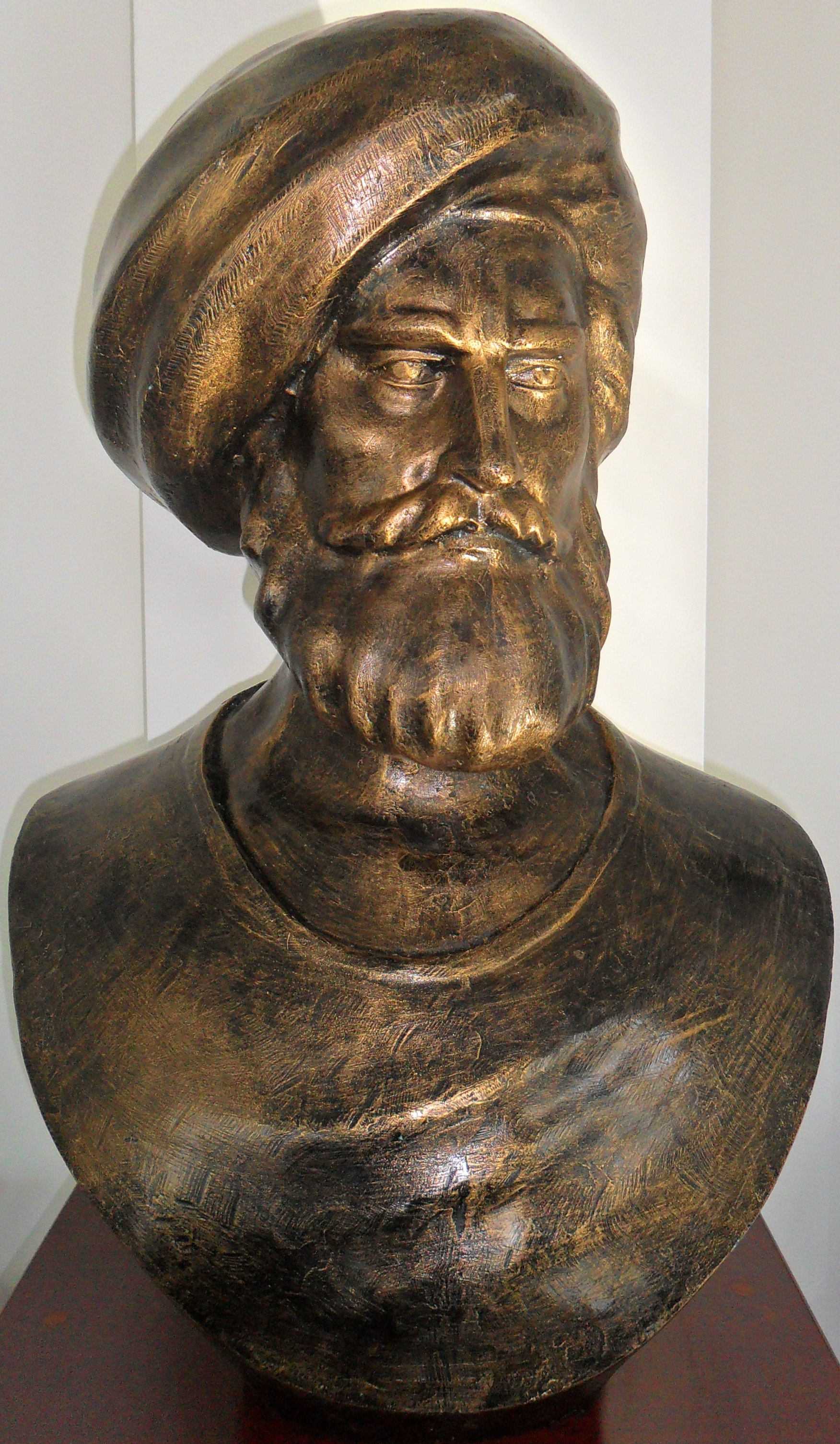
Bust of Turgut Reis in the Mersin Naval Museum.

After Barbarossa's death in July 1546, Turgut succeeded him as supreme commander of Ottoman naval forces in the Mediterranean. In July 1547 he once again assaulted Malta with a force of 23 galleys and galiots, after hearing the news that the Kingdom of Naples was shaken by the revolt against Viceroy Don Pietro of Toledo, which would make a naval support from there to Malta rather unlikely. Turgut Reis landed his troops at Marsa Scirocco, the extreme southern point of the island which faces the shores of Africa. From there the Ottoman troops quickly marched towards the vicinity of the Church of Santa Caterina. The guards of the church tower escaped as soon as they saw the forces of Turgut Reis, which prevented them from igniting the tub of gunpowder—a common method used then to warn the local inhabitants of attacks.

After sacking the island, Turgut Reis headed towards Capo Passero in Sicily, where he captured the galley of Giulio Cicala, son of Duke Vincenzo Cicala. He later sailed to the Aeolian Islands, and at Salina Island he captured a Maltese trade ship with valuable cargo. From there he sailed to Apulia and towards the end of July 1547 he assaulted the city of Salve. He later sailed to Calabria, forcing the local population to flee towards the safety of the mountains. From there he went to Corsica and captured a number of ships.

On 30 May 1550, Turgut Reis led an attack on the Mallorcan town of Pollença, but was defeated by a militia made up of the townspeople using crude farming equipment as weaponry. This event, known as the battle of the Moors and Christians, is commemorated and recreated by the townspeople of Pollença every August.

== Beylerbeyi of Algiers ==
In 1548 he was appointed Beylerbeyi (Chief Governor) of Algeria by Suleiman the Magnificent. In that same year he ordered the construction of a quadrireme galley at the naval arsenal of Djerba, which he started using in 1549. In August 1548 he landed at Castellamare di Stabia on the Bay of Naples and captured the city along with nearby Pozzuoli. From there he went to Procida. A few days later, he captured a Spanish galley loaded with troops and gold at Capo Miseno near Procida. In the same days he captured the Maltese galley, La Caterinetta, at the Gulf of Naples, with its cargo of 70,000 gold ducats which were collected by the Knights of St. John from the churches of France with the aim of strengthening the defenses of Tripoli, which was then under Maltese control.

In May 1549 he set sail towards Liguria with 21 galleys and in July he assaulted Rapallo, later replenishing his ships with water and other supplies at San Fruttuoso. From there he sailed to Portofino and landed at the port, before appearing at San Remo where he captured an Aragonese galley from Barcelona heading towards Naples. From there he first sailed towards Corsica and later towards Calabria, where he assaulted the city of Palmi.

In February 1550, sailing with a force of 36 galleys, he recaptured Mahdia along with Al Munastir, Sousse and most of Tunisia. In May 1550 he assaulted the ports of Sardinia and Spain and landed on their coasts with a force of six galleys and 14 galiots. Still in May he unsuccessfully tried to capture Bonifacio in Corsica. On his way back to Tunisia, he stopped at Gozo to replenish his ships with water and to gather information on the activities of the Maltese Knights. He later sailed towards Liguria.

In June 1550, while Turgut Reis was sailing near Genoa, Andrea Doria and Bailiff Claude de la Sengle of the Maltese Knights attacked Mahdia in Tunisia. In the meantime, Turgut Reis was busy assaulting and sacking Rapallo for a third time, before raiding the coasts of Spain. He then sailed to the Tyrrhenian Sea and towards the beginning of July landed at the western shores of Sardinia, before returning to Djerba, where he learned that Doria and Claude de la Sengle had been attacking Mahdia and Tunis. He collected a force of 4500 troops and 60 sipahis and marched on Mahdia to assist the local resistance. He did not succeed and returned to Djerba with his troops.

In September 1550 Mahdia surrendered to the joint Spanish-Sicilian-Maltese force. In the meantime, Turgut Reis was repairing his ships at the beach of Djerba. On October, Andrea Doria appeared with his fleet at Djerba and blocked the entrance of the island's lagoon with his ships, trapping the beached galleys of Turgut Reis inside the Channel of Cantera. Turgut Reis had all his ships dragged overland through hastily dug canals and on a heavily greased broadway to the other side of the island and sailed to Istanbul, capturing two galleys on the way, one Genoese and one Sicilian, which were en route to Djerba in order to assist the forces of Doria. Prince Abu Beker, son of the Sultan of Tunis, who was an ally of Spain, was on the Genoese galley.

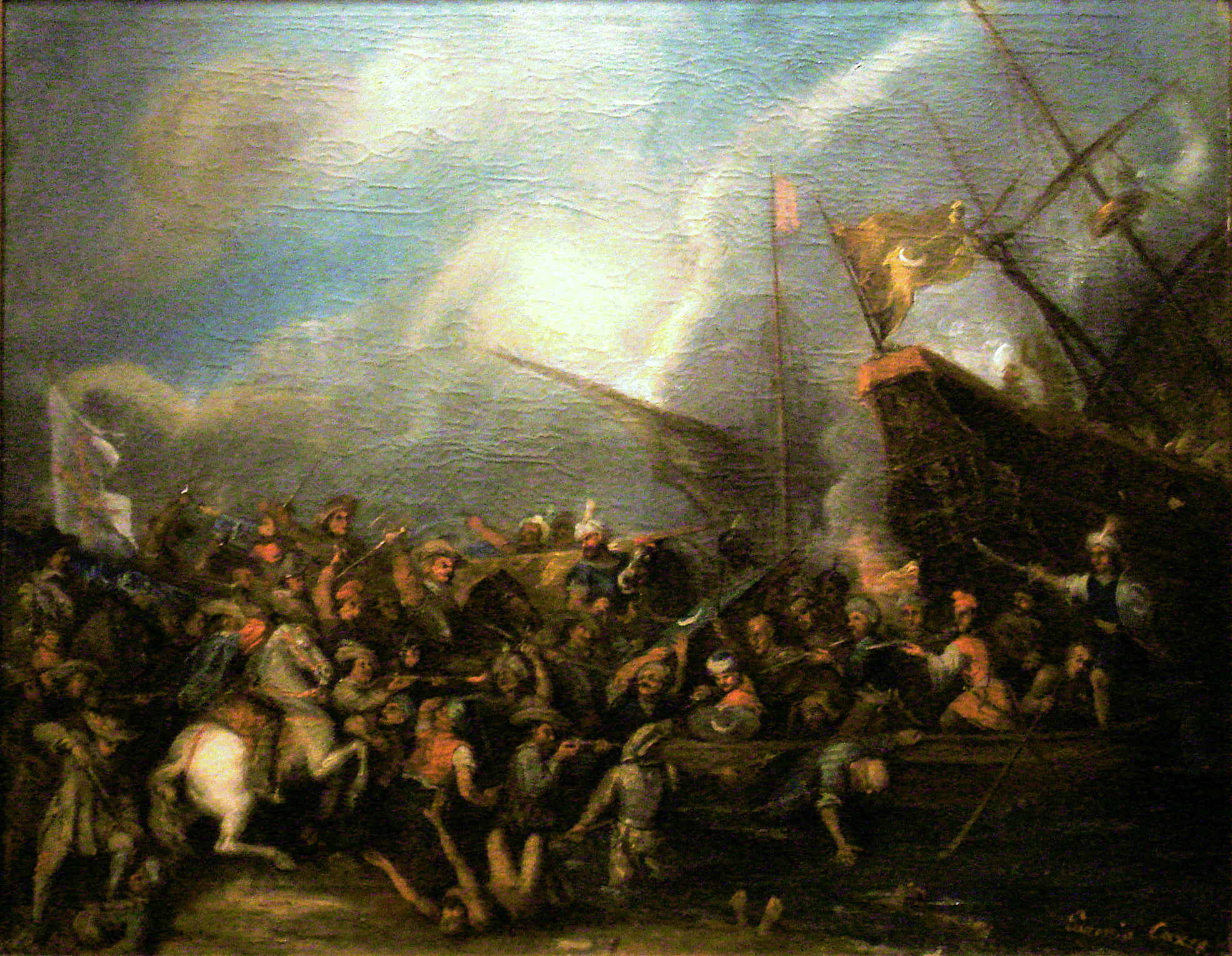
Turgut Reis landing on Malta by Eugenio Caxes.

After arriving in Istanbul, Turgut Reis, under mandate by Sultan Suleiman, mobilized a fleet of 112 galleys and two galleasses with 12,000 Janissaries, and in 1551 set sail with the Ottoman admiral Sinan Pasha towards the Adriatic Sea and bombarded the Venetian ports, inflicting serious damage on Venetian shipping.

In May 1551 they landed on Sicily and bombarded the eastern shores of the island, most notably the city of Augusta, as revenge for the Viceroy of Sicily's role in the invasion and destruction of Mahdia, where most inhabitants had been massacred by the joint Spanish-Sicilian-Maltese force. They then attempted to capture Malta, landing with about 10,000 men at the southern port of Marsa Muscietto. They laid siege to the citadels of Birgu and Senglea, and later went north and assaulted Mdina, but lifted the siege after realizing that it was impossible to capture the island with the number of troops in hand.

Instead, they moved to the neighboring island of Gozo, where they bombarded the citadel for several days. The Knights' governor there, Galatian de Sesse, realizing that resistance was futile, surrendered the citadel, and the corsairs sacked the town. Taking virtually the entire population of Gozo (approximately 5,000 people) into captivity, Turgut and Sinan set sail from the port of Mġarr ix-Xini in Gozo and headed towards Libya, where they shipped the captives to Tarhuna Wa Msalata. They later sailed towards Tripoli with the aim of conquering the strategic port city and its environs.

== Sanjak Bey of Tripoli ==
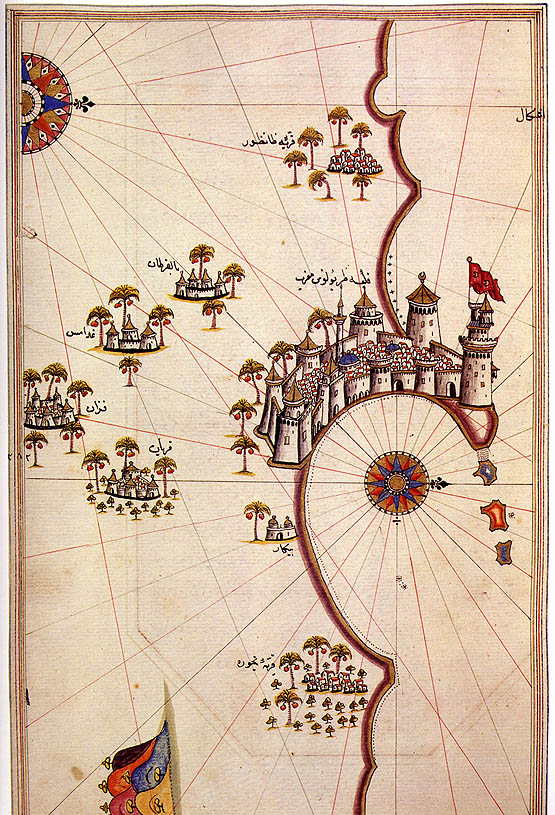
Historic map of Tripoli by Piri Reis.

In August 1551 Turgut Reis attacked and captured Tripoli (Ottoman Tripolitania, modern Libya) which had been a possession of the Knights of St. John since 1530. Gaspare de Villers, the commander of the fort, was captured, along with other prominent knights of Spanish and French origin.

However, upon the intervention of the French ambassador in Constantinople, Gabriel d'Aramon, the French knights were released. A local leader, Murad Agha, was initially installed as governor of Tripoli, but subsequently Turgut himself took control of the area. In recognition of his services, Sultan Suleiman awarded Tripoli and the surrounding territory to Turgut, along with the title of Sanjak Bey ("Lord of the Standard").

In September 1551, Turgut Reis sailed to Liguria and captured the city of Taggia, before capturing other ports of the Italian Riviera, after Ottoman troops landed at the beach of Riva Trigoso. Later that year, he returned to Tripoli and sought to extend his territory, capturing the entire region of Misrata all the way to Zuwara and Djerba to the west. Turning inland, he enhanced his territory until reaching Gebel.

== Beylerbeyi of the Mediterranean ==
Following this victory, Suleiman appointed Turgut Beylerbeyi (Chief Regional Governor) of the Mediterranean Sea.

In May 1553, Turgut Reis set sail from the Aegean Sea with 60 galleys, captured Crotone and Castello in Calabria, and from there marched inland. Later he landed on Sicily and sacked most of the island until stopping at Licata for replenishing his ships with water. In August 1553, he sacked the island of Pantelleria.

From there he sailed to Corsica and took Bonifacio and Bastia on behalf of France, then ally of the Ottoman Empire, which paid him 30,000 gold ducats for the expense of ammunition in the conquest. Leaving Corsica, Turgut Reis returned to Elba and attempted to capture Piombino and Portoferraio, but eventually gave up and captured the island of Pianosa and recaptured the island and castle of Capri (previously captured by Barbarossa back in 1535) before returning to Istanbul.

In 1554 he sailed from the Bosphorus with 60 galleys and passed the winter in Chios. From there he sailed to the Adriatic Sea and landed at Vieste near Foggia, capturing and sacking the city, killing 5000 of its inhabitants.

== Pasha of Tripoli ==
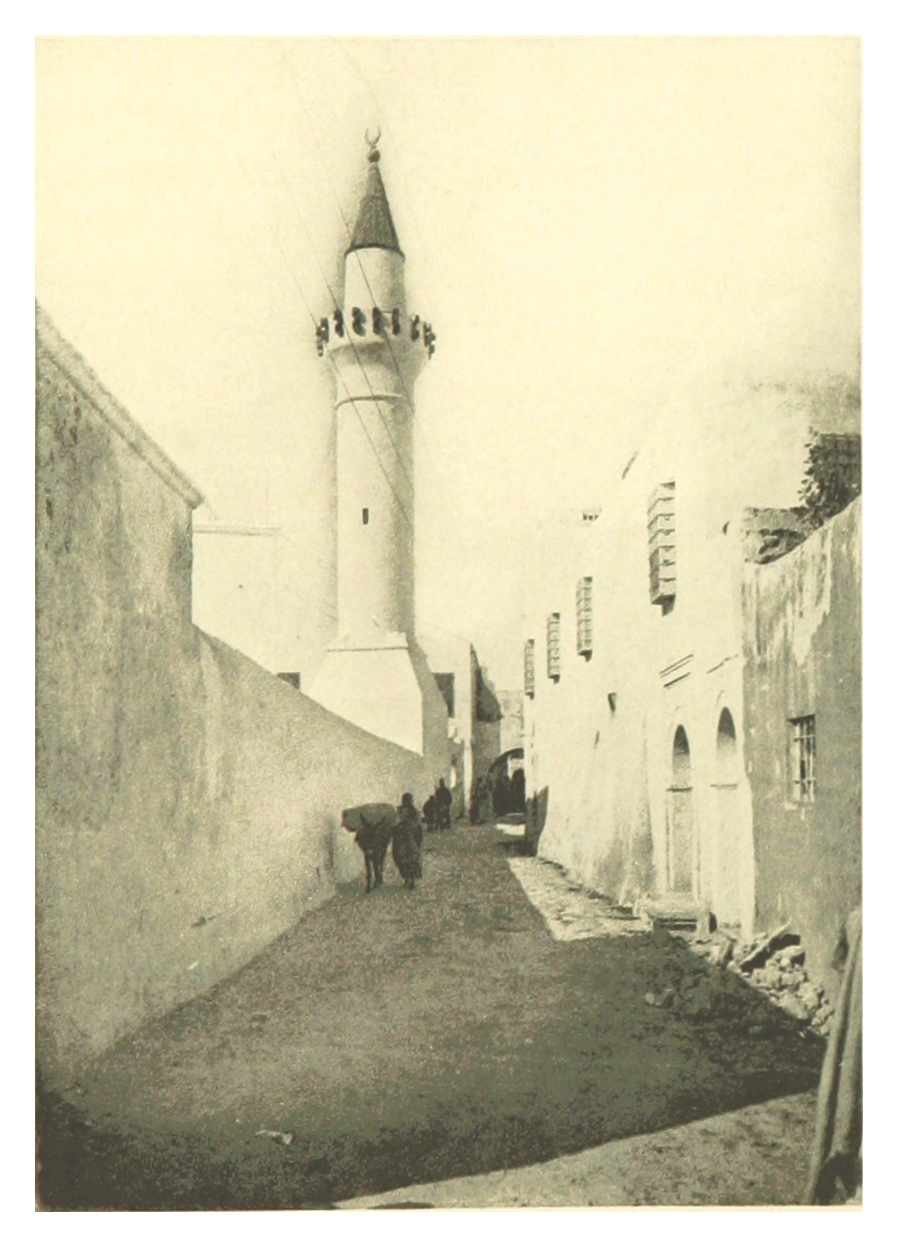
Sidi Darghut Mosque in Tripoli

In March 1556, Turgut Reis was appointed Pasha of Tripoli. There, he strengthened the walls of the citadel surrounding the city and built a gunpowder bastion (Dar el Barud). He also strengthened the defenses of the port and built the Turgut (Dragut) Fortress in place of the old Fortress of San Pietro. In July 1556 he again set sail and landed at Cape Santa Maria at the island of Lampedusa, where he captured a Venetian ship which transported ammunition and weapons for the defense of Malta. He later landed in Liguria and captured Bergeggi and San Lorenzo. In December 1556 he captured Gafsa in Tunisia and added it to his territory.

In the summer of 1557 he left the Bosphorus with a fleet of 60 galleys and, arriving at the Gulf of Taranto, he landed in Calabria and assaulted Cariati, capturing the city. He later landed at the ports of Apulia.

In 1558 he added Gharyan, about 70 miles south of Tripoli, to his territory. He then defeated the Beni Oulid dynasty with a force of janissaries and added their territories to the Ottoman Empire. He later took Taorga, Misrata and Tagiora, before recapturing the island of Djerba and adding it to his province. In June 1558 he joined the fleet of Piyale Pasha at the Strait of Messina, and the two admirals captured Reggio Calabria, sacking the city.

From there, Turgut Reis went to the Aeolian Islands and captured several of them, before landing at Amalfi, in the Gulf of Salerno, and capturing Massa Lubrense, Cantone and Sorrento. He later landed at Torre del Greco, the coasts of Tuscany, and Piombino. In August he captured several ships off Malta. In September 1558 he joined Piyale Pasha, and the two admirals assaulted the coasts of Spain before capturing Ciutadella (Menorca) and inflicting particular damage on the island's ports.

In 1559 he repelled a Spanish attack on Algiers and put down a revolt in Tripoli. In that same year he captured a Maltese ship near Messina. Learning from its crew that the knights were preparing for a major attack on Tripoli, he decided to sail back there and strengthen the city's defenses.

== Battle of Djerba ==
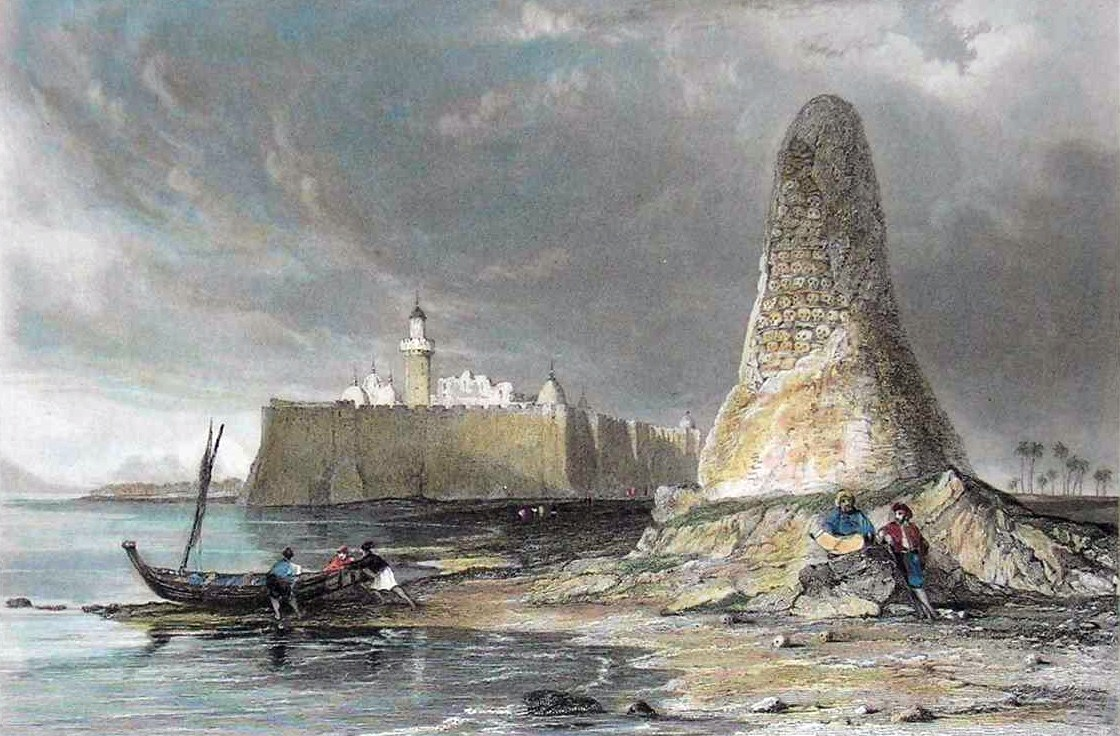
The aftermath of the Battle of Djerba resulted in the alleged construction of a tower of skulls from the remains of the fallen.

In the meantime, Dragut had made enemies of many of the nominally Ottoman, but practically independent rulers in Tunis and the adjoining hinterland, and several of them entered into an alliance in 1560 with Viceroy Cerda of Sicily, who had orders from King Philip II of Spain to join his forces in an effort to capture Tripoli.

Philip II's efforts ended in failure when the Ottoman fleet of 86 ships, under the command of Piyale Pasha and Turgut Reis, decisively defeated the fleet of the Christian alliance of Philip II, consisting of 200 ships, at the Battle of Djerba.

== Mediterranean landings and sieges ==
In March 1561 Turgut Reis and Uluç Ali Reis captured Vincenzo Cicala and Luigi Osorio near the island of Marettimo. In June 1561 Turgut landed on the island of Stromboli. In July 1561 he captured seven Maltese galleys under the command of knight Guimarens, whom he later freed for a ransom of 3,000 gold ducats. After stopping at Gozo to replenish his galleys with water, he sailed back to Tripoli. In August 1561 he laid siege to the city of Naples and blocked the port with 35 galleys.

In April 1562 he sent scout ships to explore all corners of the island of Malta. Still in 1562 he laid siege to Oran which was under Spanish control.

In 1563, he landed at the shores of the province of Granada and captured coastal settlements in the area like Almuñécar, along with 4,000 prisoners. He later landed at Málaga. In April 1563 he supported the fleet of Salih Reis with 20 galleys during the Ottoman siege of Oran, bombarding the Fortress of Mers-el-Kebir.

In September 1563, Dragut sailed to Naples and captured six ships near the island of Capri, which carried valuable goods and Spanish soldiers. He later landed at the Chiaia neighbourhood of Naples and captured it. From there he sailed to Liguria and Sardinia, raiding the coastal towns, particularly Oristano, Marcellino and Ercolento. He then sailed to the Adriatic Sea and landed on the coasts of Apulia and Abruzzo. He later landed twice at San Giovanni near Messina with a force of 28 galleys. In October 1563 he sailed towards Capo Passero in Sicily and later landed once more on Gozo, where he briefly fought against the knights.

== Siege of Malta and death ==
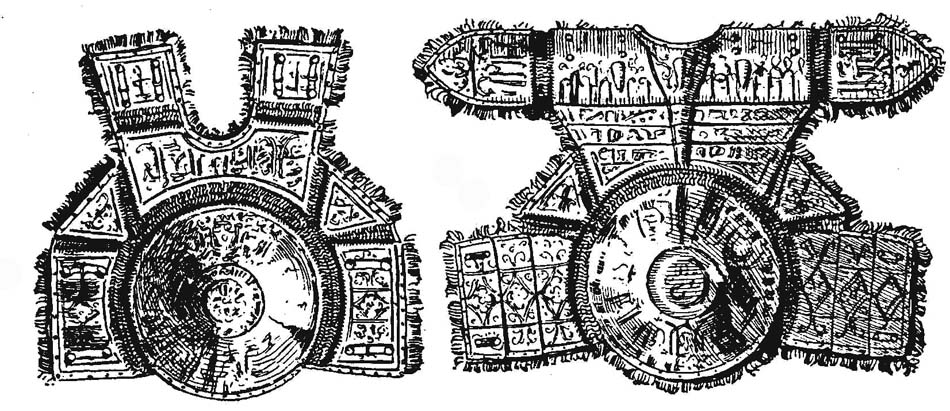
Artist's impression of the mirrored armour worn by Dragut.

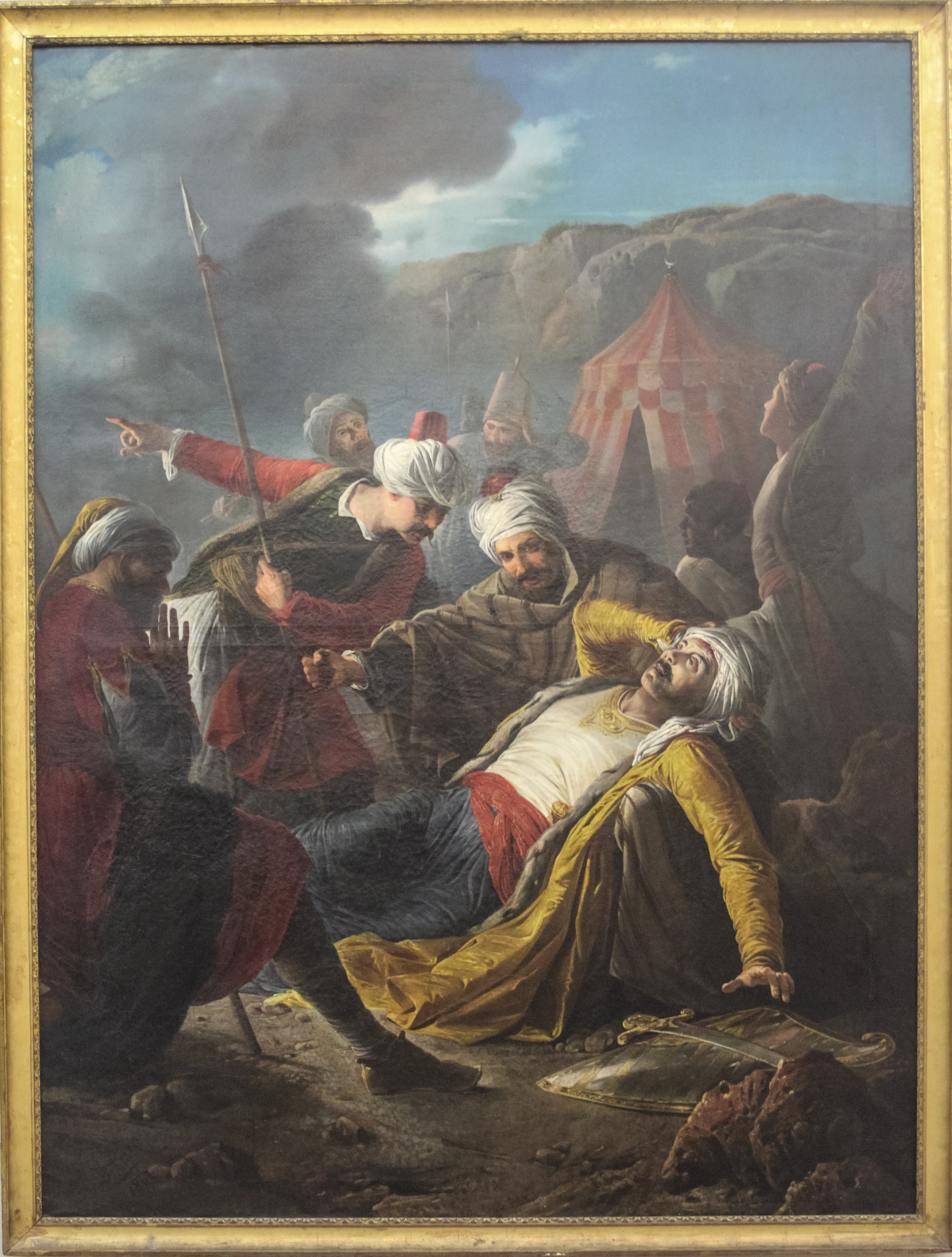
Death of Dragut by Giuseppe Calì.

When Sultan Suleiman ordered the Great Siege of Malta in 1565, Dragut joined Piyale Pasha and the Ottoman forces with 1,600 men (3,000 according to some sources) and 15 ships (13 galleys and 2 galiots; while some sources mention 17 ships) on 31 May 1565. He landed his troops at the entrance of Marsa Muscietto, a cape which was named after him, 'Dragut Point'.

It was there where Dragut met with Kızılahmedli Mustafa Pasha, commander of the Ottoman land forces, who was besieging Fort St. Elmo. Dragut advised him to first capture the poorly defended Cittadella and Mdina as soon as possible, but this advice was not taken. Dragut also arranged for more cannon fire to be concentrated on the recently built Fort St. Elmo which controlled the entrance of the Grand Harbour and seemed weaker than the other forts; joining the bombardment with 30 of his own cannon. In only 24 hours the Ottomans fired 6000 cannon shots. Realizing that Fort St. Elmo and Fort St. Angelo (the main headquarters of the Knights on the other side of the Grand Harbour) could still communicate with each other, Dragut ordered a complete siege of Fort St. Elmo with the aim of isolating it from Fort St. Angelo.

On 18 June 1565, Dragut was injured on the head, after he was hit by a piece of rock when a cannonball struck close to his position. It is not clear if the shot was fired from Fort St. Angelo, or if he was hit by friendly fire from a Turkish battery. Dragut succumbed to his wounds and died five days later, on 23 June 1565. Spanish and Italian historians such as Francisco Balbi di Correggio record the eventual defeat of Dragut's forces, after his death, in Malta. Many historians believe that, had he lived, the siege would have succeeded. His death, however, prompted squabbling between the two senior Ottoman military officers, which led, in turn, to a series of disastrous decisions that helped save the knights. His body was taken to Tripoli by Uluç Ali Reis, and buried in the Sidi Darghut Mosque, situated behind the castle. The mosque is still in use today.

== Legacy ==
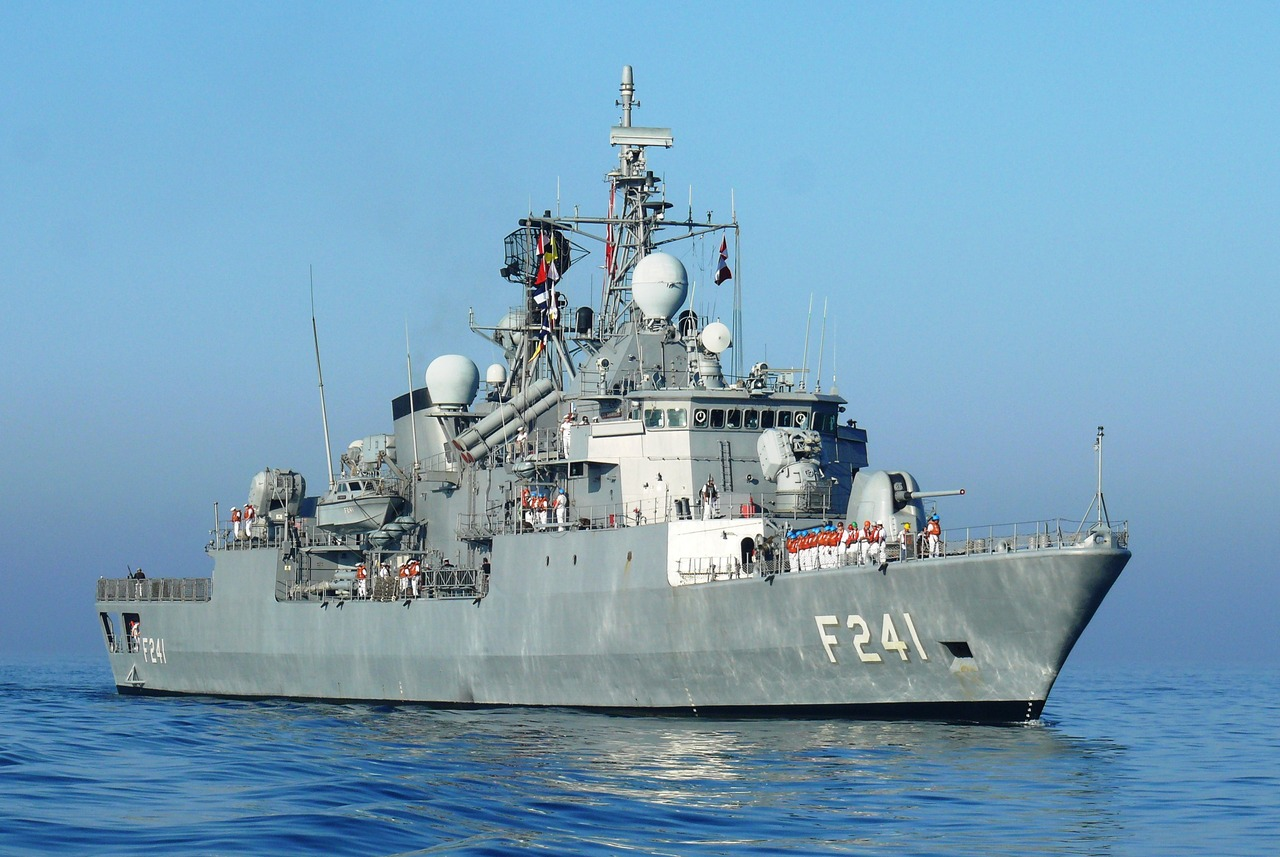
F-241 TCG Turgut Reis, a Yavuz class (MEKO 200 TN Track I) frigate of the Turkish Navy, in Cartagena, Spain.

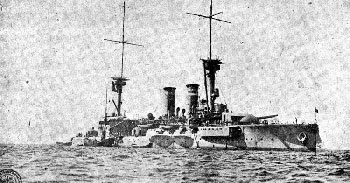
The Ottoman battleship Turgut Reis.

Dragut is depicted in many works of art, statues, and many books have been written about his life and conquests. Points of interest and buildings in multiple countries have been named after his native Turkish name of Turgut Reis. The town where he was born now bears his name, being renamed from Karatoprak in his honor, in 1972. Warships of the Turkish Navy, and passenger ships have been named after Turgut Reis. Turgut Reis continues to enjoy great fame and respect in Turkey, where the town of his birth is named Turgutreis.

The end of the Tigne promontory in Malta is called Dragut Point, where Turgut established his first battery for the bombardment of Fort Saint Elmo in 1565. Dragut is considered a nemesis in Maltese history, and "il-Ponta ta' Dragut" serves as a memorial to the great battles that were fought there and the ultimate defeat of Dragut at the Great Siege of Malta.

== In popular culture ==
- Rafael Sabatini's story "The Sword of Islam" was published in Premier magazine, August 1914.
- David W. Ball's novel Ironfire (Bantam Dell 2004, published as The Sword and the Scimitar in the U.K., and in two parts as Haç ve Hilal - Savrulan Yürekler and Haç ve Hilal - Kavuşan Yürekler, Istanbul, 2005). This novel of the 16th century Mediterranean includes details of the life of Dragut from the Battle of Djerba to the Siege of Malta.
- The Course of Fortune by Tony Rothman (J. Boylston 2015, in three volumes). In this novel, which follows the adventures of a young Spaniard throughout the contest between the Turks and Christians to control the Mediterranean, Dragut is portrayed as a clever and ruthless adversary from his enslavement of the population of Gozo in 1551, through the Djerba campaign in 1560 and finally to the Siege of Malta in 1565.
- The Disorderly Knights and Pawn in Frankincense by Dorothy Dunnett both feature Dragut Rais as part of the 6-book series, the Lymond Chronicles, following fictional character Francis Crawford of Lymond.
- Civilization V features Turgut Reis as a Great Admiral.
- Vengeance Island (2020) by Geoff Nelder, features Dragut in his role of the mass abduction of Gozo, in 1551.

== See also ==
- List of Muslim military leaders
- Military of the Ottoman Empire

== General sources ==
- Bono, Salvatore, Corsari nel Mediterraneo (Corsairs in the Mediterranean), Oscar Storia Mondadori. Perugia, 1993.
- Bradford, Ernle, The Sultan's Admiral: The life of Barbarossa, London, 1968.
- Currey, E. Hamilton, Sea-Wolves of the Mediterranean, London, 1910
- Wolf, John B., The Barbary Coast: Algeria under the Turks, New York, 1979; ISBN 0-393-01205-0
- Corsari nel Mediterraneo: Condottieri di ventura. Online database in Italian, based on Salvatore Bono's book.
- The Ottomans: Comprehensive and detailed online chronology of Ottoman history in English.
- Comprehensive and detailed online chronology of Ottoman history (in Turkish)
- Turkish Navy official website: Historic heritage of the Turkish Navy (in Turkish)
