= Sack of Lipari =

- Part of Spanish–Ottoman wars
Date	1544
Location	Lipari, Italy
Result	Ottoman victory
Territorial changes	Barbarossa captures Lipari

Belligerents
Kingdom of Naples	Ottoman Empire

Commanders and leaders
Pedro de Toledo	Hayreddin Barbarossa

Strength
Unknown	Unknown

Casualties and losses
Heavy losses 9,000–11,000 inhabitants enslaved	Unknown

The sack of Lipari took place in 1544 when Hayreddin Barbarossa sacked the island and captured all or almost all of the islands inhabitants.

Hayreddin Barbarossa had just captured Ischia and took care of 4,000 inhabitants. He moved towards Lipari in the Kingdom of Naples where the viceroy, Pedro de Toledo, was warned of his movements.

Barbarossa arrived and put the island under siege rejecting two envoys that had been sent asking for peace. The third envoy Jacopo Camagna appealed for clemency offering Lipari to Barbarossa in exchange for the safety of its inhabitants, however Barbarossa replied “You came too late for clemency. How dare you offer what is already mine? Keep your gates closed - we’ve opened a hundred such breaches with our cannon. Lipari is already in my power: it is foolishly presumptuous to grant me apparently of your own free will what you no longer possess. This is no time for treaties or agreements: you are all my slaves.”

Barbarossa eventually agreed to a negotiation for the freedom of 26 families in exchange for their belongings which he took before setting on fire the towns archives, stealing whatever he could find and desecrating a cathedral and a church. An estimated 9,000 or 11,000 inhabitants of Lipari were enslaved. The Ottomans later sacked Vieste in southern Italy where they enslaved 7,000 inhabitants.

== See also ==
- Sack of Vieste
