= Sack of Vieste =

- Part of Spanish–Ottoman wars
Date	15–24 July 1554
Location	Vieste, Italy
Result	Ottoman victory
Territorial changes	Ottomans capture Vieste

Belligerents
Kingdom of Naples	Ottoman Empire

Commanders and leaders
Unknown	Dragut

Strength
Unknown	60 or 70 galleys

Casualties and losses
Heavy losses 5,000–7,000 enslaved 5,000 beheaded	Unknown

The sack of Vieste was conducted by Dragut, an Ottoman naval commander. It took place on 15 July 1554. This sack resulted in the capture of the fortress, a massacre, and the enslavement of thousands.

On 15 July 1554, Dragut landed in Vieste with 60 or 70 galleys. Upon his arrival, the inhabitants of Vieste took shelter between a cathedral and castle, which they had barricaded. The Italians negotiated a surrender and delivered gold and silver, hoping it would be enough to save Vieste.

They opened the doors on 24 July and the Turks entered, from which they began to sack the town. The archpriest of Vieste and his family were taken captive and ransomed.

5,000 to 7,000 inhabitants were enslaved and Dragut ordered the beheading of everyone he was unable to carry off in slavery. This resulted in the beheading of 5,000 people. One source claims the entire population of Vieste was beheaded, describing the event as a massacre. Another raid occurred in Naples the same year where a joint Ottoman–Algerian force took 7,000 slaves.

== See also ==
- Sack of Lipari
