= Battle of Lipari =

Part of Spanish–Ottoman wars

Battle of Lipari (1561)
- Part of Spanish–Ottoman wars
Date	July 1561
Location	Lipari
Result	Ottoman victory

Belligerents
Ottoman Empire	Kingdom of Sicily

Commanders and leaders
Turgut Reis	Friar Bernardo †

Strength
9 ships	7 ships

Casualties and losses
Unknown	All ships captured

The Battle of Lipari was a battle in which the Ottoman navy, commanded by the Tripoli Beylerbeyi Turgut Reis, defeated the Kingdom of Sicily (affiliated to the Spanish Empire) navy under the command of the Guimeran Priest Bernardo in a naval battle off the island of Lipari in July 1561, capturing all of its ships.

== Battle ==
The Kingdom of Sicily, which suffered a great loss along with the Spanish Empire to which it was subjected in the Battle of Djerba (1560), which resulted in a great victory for the Ottoman navy, appointed Knight of Malta Guimeran Friar Bernardo as the commander of its fleet (in the absence of Berenguer de Requesens, who was still a prisoner). In July, Guimeran was tasked with taking Bishop Nicola Maria Caracciolo of Catania to Naples at the head of 7 galleys.

While carrying out this task, he came across two quality belonging to Turgut Reis near the island of Stromboli and set out to capture them with his 3 ships. However, when he arrived off the coast of Lipari, he fell into the trap of 7 galleys belonging to Turgut Reis.

Instead of taking refuge in Lipari or fleeing to Sicily, Guimeran preferred to fight. In the battle in which all ships entered, the flagship of the Sicilians was boarded by Turkish sailors, and Guimeran died from arquebus fire in his head. As a result of a clash that lasted less than an hour, first the captain's ship and then the entire Sicily fleet were captured by Turgut Reis.

== Aftermath ==
Turgut Reis commanded Ottoman fleet after replenishing water in Gozo returned to Tripoli with captive ships. Then in August they put to sea again and blockaded Naples.
