= Sidi Darghut Mosque =

Mosque in Tripoli, Libya

- Arabic: جامع درغوت باشا
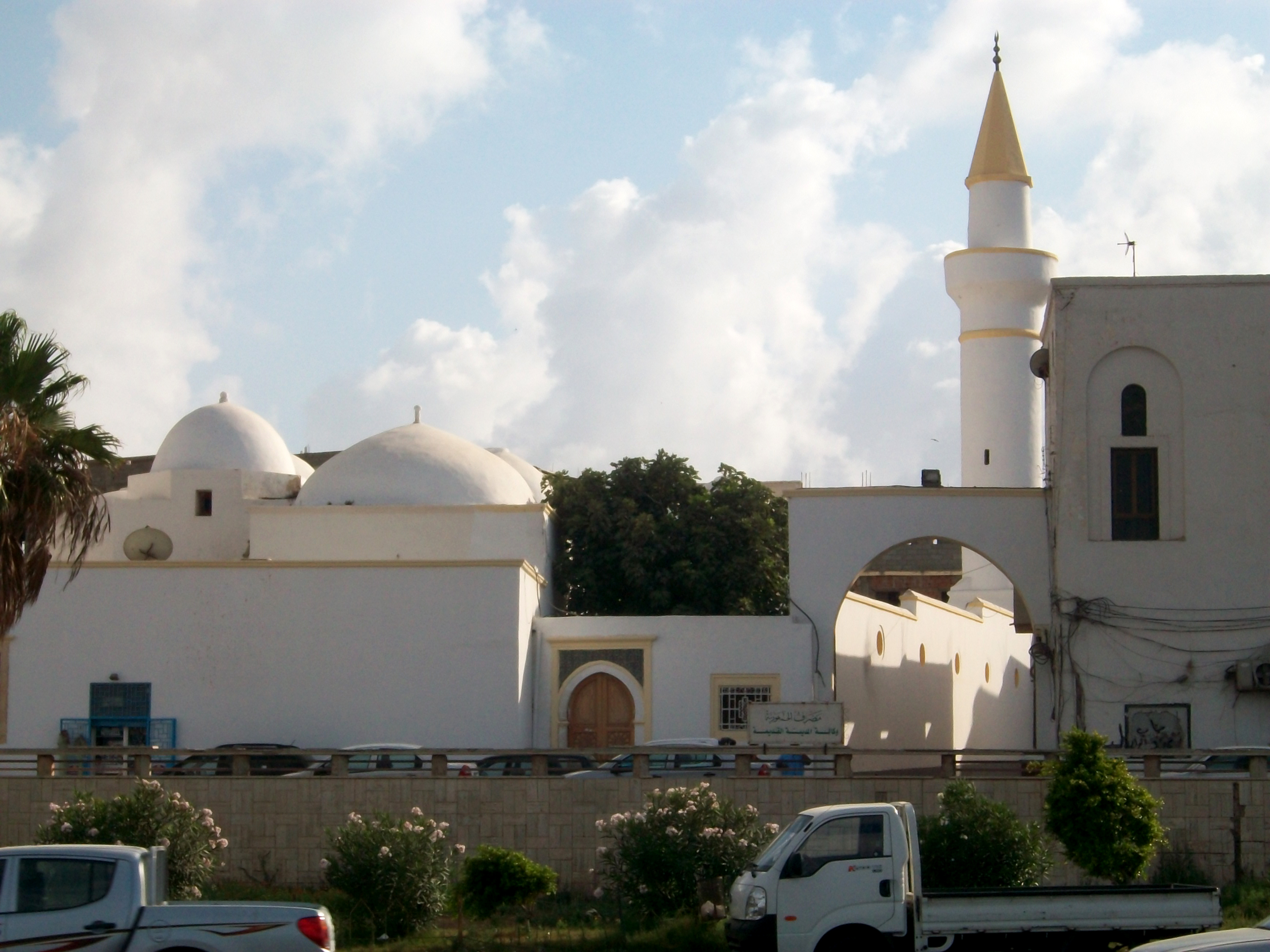
- The exterior of the mosque, in 2012

- Location of the mosque in Tripoli

Religion
- Affiliation: Sunni Islam
- Ecclesiastical or organizational status: Mosque
- Status: Active

Location
- Location: Tripoli, Tripolitania
- Country: Libya
- Interactive map of Sidi Darghut Mosque
- Coordinates: 32°53′55.7″N 13°10′37.6″E

Architecture
- Type: Mosque architecture
- Style: Ottoman
- Founder: Dragut
- Established: c. 1560

Specifications
- Dome: 32 (originally 27)
- Minaret: One

The Sidi Darghut Mosque (Arabic: جامع درغوت باشا), also known as the Jama Sidi Darghut, is a Sunni Islam mosque, located in Tripoli, Libya. It was built in approximately 1560 CE by Dragut on the site of a Hospitaller church, parts of which were incorporated into the mosque. The mosque was damaged in World War II, and it was subsequently repaired, although the reconstruction was not completely faithful to its original design.

== History ==
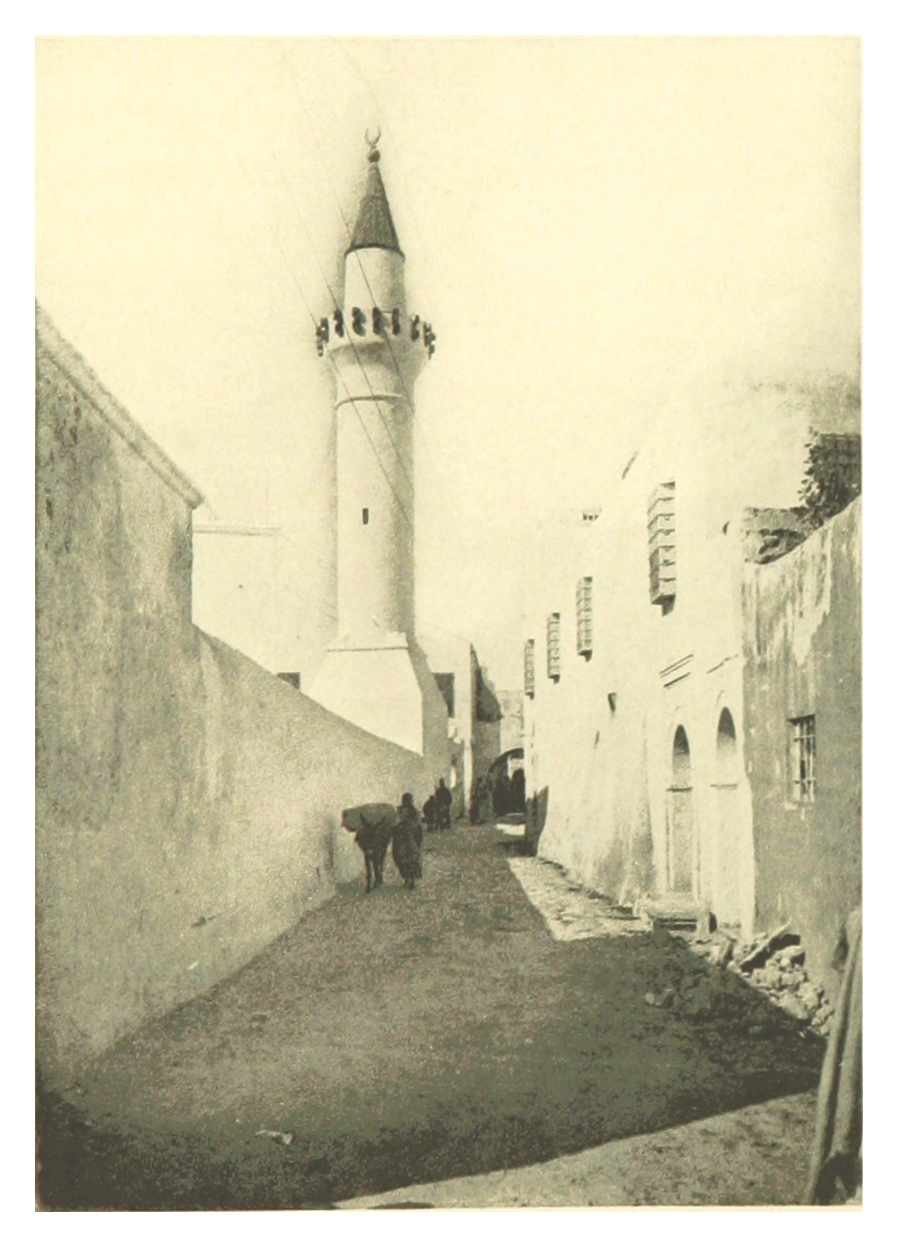
Late 19th-century illustration of the mosque

The Sidi Darghut Mosque was built in c. 1560 by the Ottoman governor Dragut, shortly after the 1551 recapture of Tripoli from the Knights Hospitaller. The site of the mosque was formerly occupied by the Hospitaller church or chapel. The church had survived the 1551 siege, and Dragut personally chose this site to build his mosque. According to local tradition, the church building was retained intact and incorporated into the mosque. After Dragut was killed whilst attacking the Hospitallers in the Great Siege of Malta in 1565, his body was taken to Tripoli and buried in the mosque.

A number of alterations were carried out to the mosque by Iskander Pasha in the early 1600s, including the remodelling of the minaret and the construction of a hammam (or at least the renovation of an existing one).

The Superintendence of Monuments and Excavations made an accurate survey of the site in 1921. The building was restored in the 1920s, although it was bombarded during World War II and the central part of the building (which had been the church) was severely damaged. Reconstruction works were undertaken by Ali Mohamed Abu Zaian, and the rebuilt mosque contains a number of differences from the original building.

Armed men attempted to vandalise the mosque several times during the 2014 violence in Libya, and were repelled.

== Architecture ==
The Sidi Darghut Mosque was the first Ottoman style mosque to be built in Tripoli. The building has a T-shaped prayer hall, with a plan bearing some similarities to mosques found in Anatolia. The Hospitaller church was a small rectangular building with timber beams supporting a flat roof, and when it was converted into a mosque new wings were added on either side of the original building. The mosque is set within a trapezoidal enclosure which includes other facilities including a cemetery.

The prayer hall has a roof which originally consisted of 27 small cupolas (32 after the postwar reconstruction). This element is typical of traditional Libyan architecture, and it later became a common element in mosques built in the area. The mosque includes two mihrabs, and a number of tombs including that of Dragut and his family are found near one of them. The mosque also includes a fountain for ablution (known as a midha) and a minaret which was remodelled by Iskander Pasha in 1602.

== See also ==
- History of Islam in Libya
- List of mosques in Libya
