= Torra di l'Isula di Gargali =

Genoese coastal defence tower in Corsica

Tower of Isula di Gargali
- Torra di l'Isula di Gargali (Corsican)
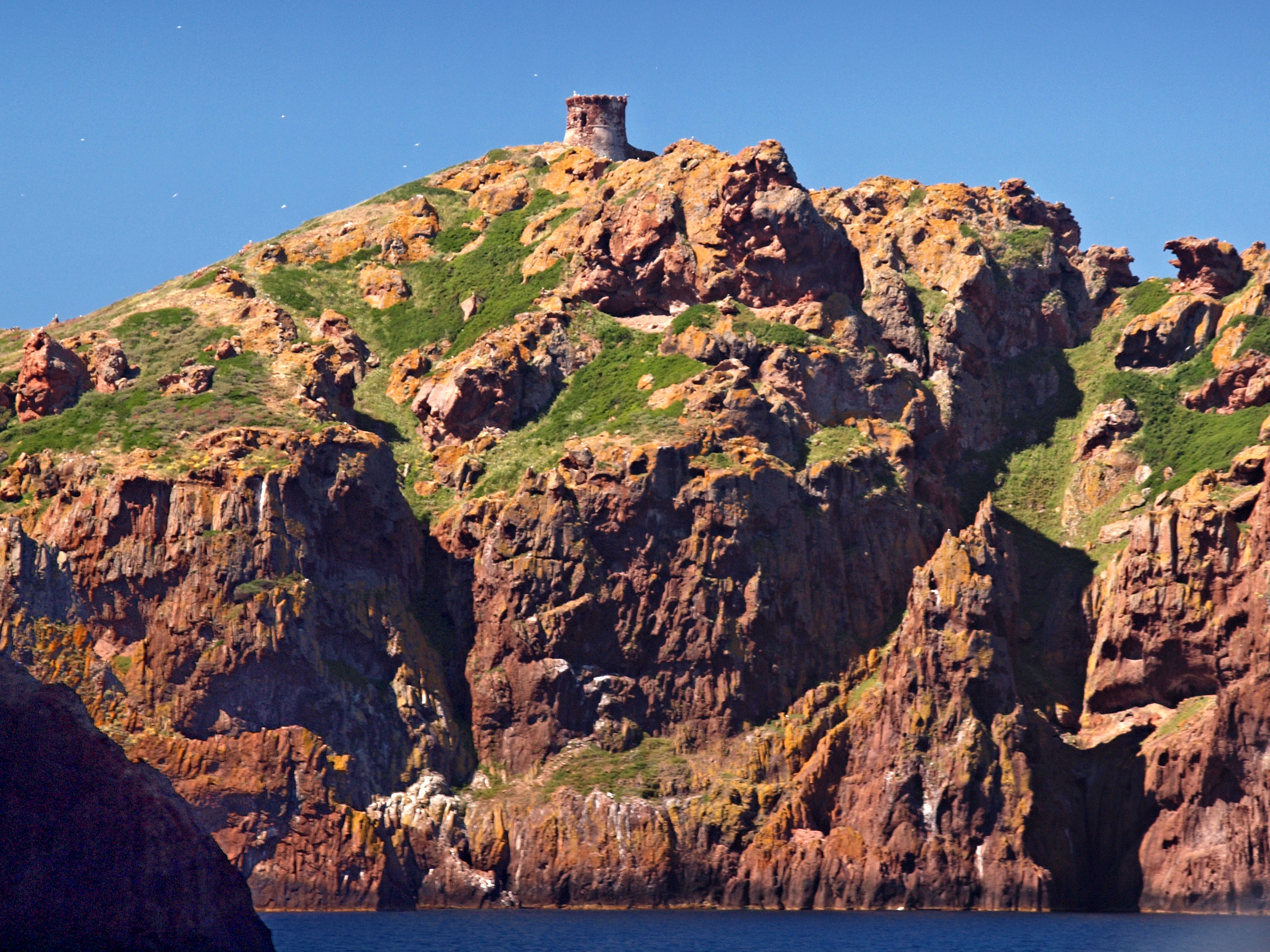

- Location within Corsica
- 42°22′14″N 8°32′20.5″E

History
- Built: Second half 16th century

The Tower of Isula di Gargali (Corsican: Torra di l'Isula di Gargali) is a ruined Genoese tower located in the commune of Osani on the eponymous islet off the west coast of the Corsica. The rocky islet lies within the Scandola Nature Reserve.

The tower was one of a series of coastal defences constructed by the Republic of Genoa between 1530 and 1620 to stem the attacks by Barbary pirates.

== See also ==
- List of Genoese towers in Corsica
