= Giuseppe Calì =

Maltese painter

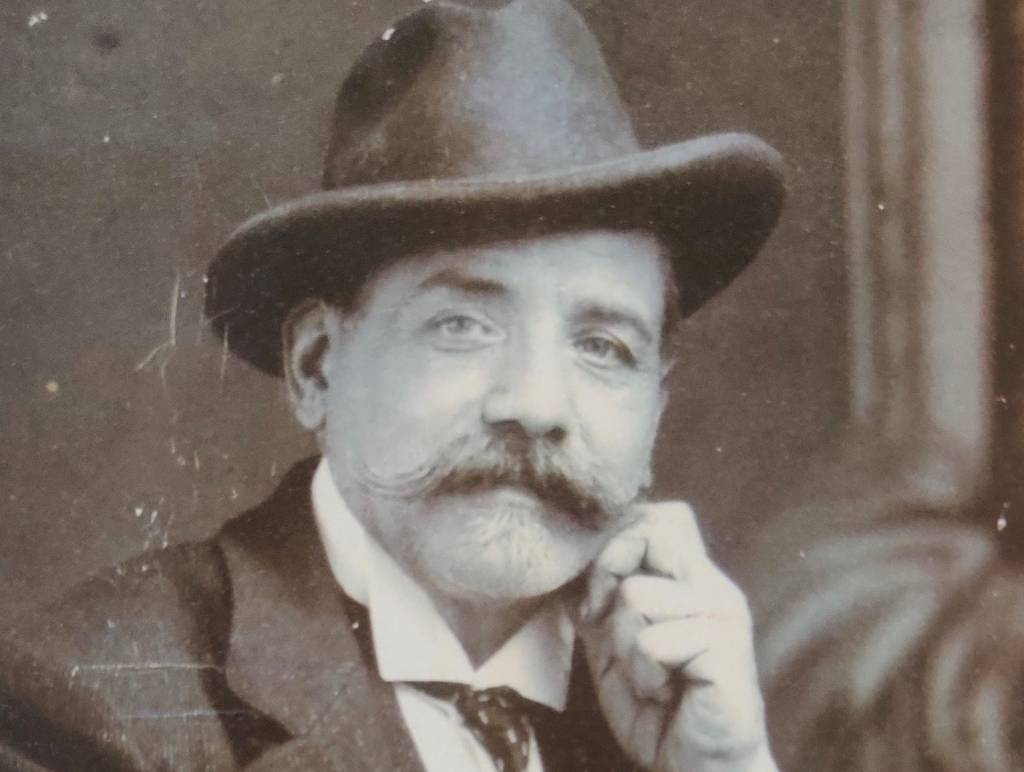
- Calì c. 1890
- Born: 14 August 1846; Valletta, Crown Colony of Malta
- Died: 1 March 1930 (aged 83); Valletta, Crown Colony of Malta
- Education: Giuseppe Mancinelli
- Alma mater: Accademia delle Belle Arti
- Notable work: Death of Dragut

Giuseppe Calì (14 August 1846 – 1 March 1930) was a Maltese painter of Italian descent.

== Biography ==
Born in Valletta, Calì was baptised at the Dominican Parish Church of Porto Salvo, one of the seven offsprings of the artist and musician Raffaele Calì, set designer at the Royal Theatre, and of mezzo-soprano Giovanna Padiglione. His parents, who were from Naples, had moved to British Malta in 1840.

At age 19, in 1865, thanks to the generosity of the merchant William Stephen Eynaud, Calì moved to Naples to further his artistic formation at the Accademia di Belle Arti, where he studied under neoclassicist Giuseppe Mancinelli (1812–1875). Rather than following Mancinelli's style, the young Calì was attracted by the anti-academic Domenico Morelli (1826–1901), a follower of the Verismo movement. In Naples, Calì also grew closer to Romanticism and to the Italian Risorgimento. He made return to Valletta two years later, in 1867, summoned by his terrified parents who were told that their son planned to join Garibaldi in his latest attempt to overthrow the Papal States.

His first major work, The Death of Dragut from 1867, is still deemed a masterpiece; it was purchased by the government and placed on permanent display in the armory of the Grandmaster's Palace, Valletta - then later at the Museum of Fine Arts, today's MUŻA. The influences of both Mancinelli and Morelli are visible in the Death of Dragut and in other works of his early period.

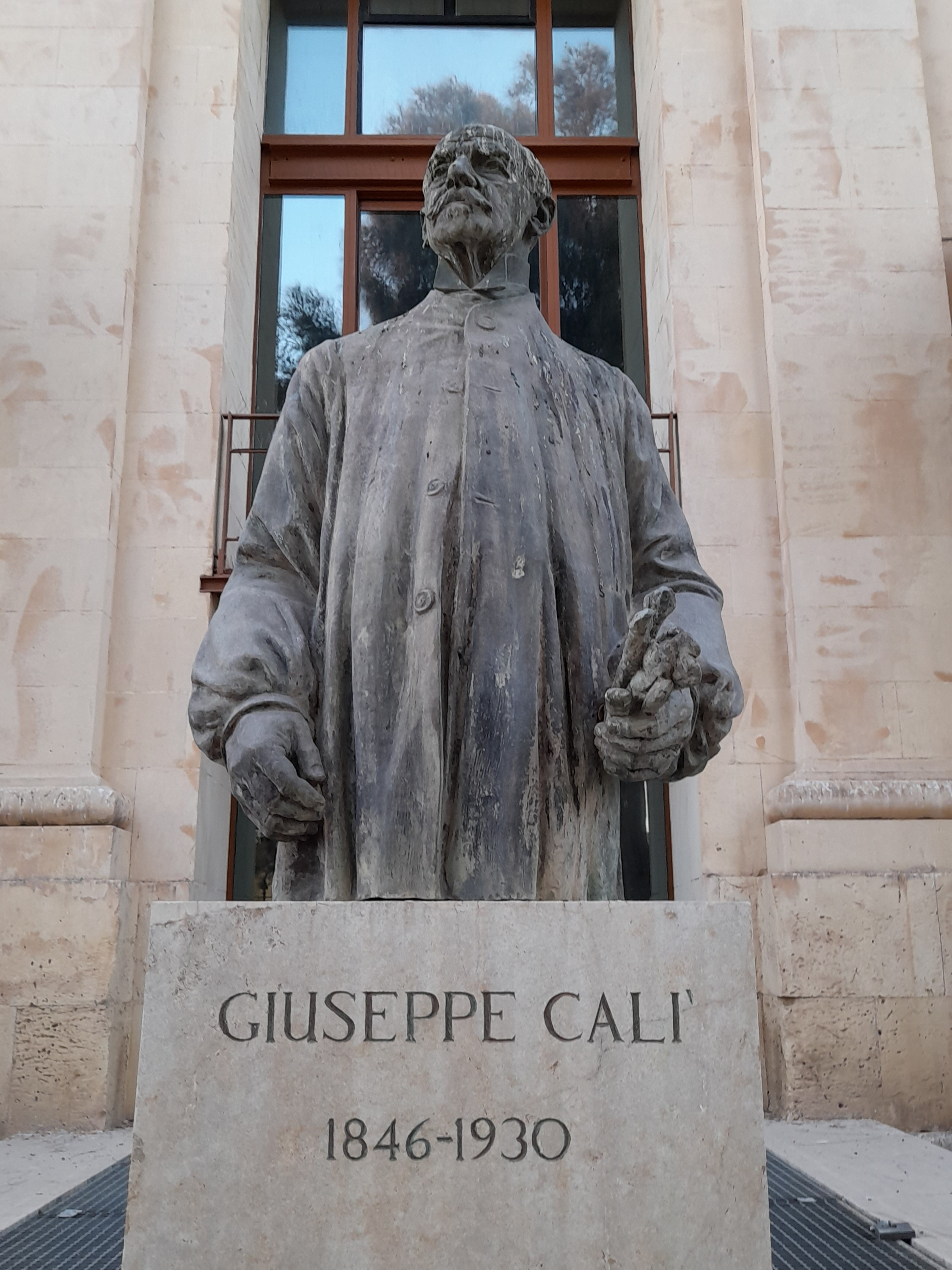
The bust of Calì located behind the Malta Stock Exchange in the Upper Barrakka Gardens

Calì's art soon found wide acceptance in Malta, where he got employed in decorating private houses with landscapes and portraits. Only after 1870 Calì started to accept Church commissions. In 1881 he pained St. Jerome at the Sacro Cuor Church in Sliema, also deemed among his major works.

Calì married Perennia Pace from Senglea in 1871, with whom had 11 children. In order to sustain the family, he got employed as art teacher at the Lyceum.

As an established authority in the artistic scene in the island, Calì started to grow his own school, favouring the style of Verismo over the rampant Neo-Classicism and academicism. Among his students were his son Ramiro Raffaele Calì, Raphael Bonnici Calì, Gianni Vella and Ignatio Cefai.

He died in Valletta and was commemorated by the Republic of Malta with a series of four postage stamps in 1996, and a coin in 2004. His son Ramiro Calì was also a painter. A bust of him is located behind the Malta Stock Exchange in the Upper Barrakka Gardens in Valletta.

== Works ==
Giuseppe Calì was a very prolific artist, almost every major church in Malta prides itself on his work. He worked very quickly, and according to one of his grandsons he was called ix-xitan tal-pinzell ("devil of the brush"). His performance was enormous; during his lifetime he made more than 600 different compositions (according to some sources - about 2,000) consisting of an impressive variety of paintings, drawings, bozzetti, portraits and decorations of church vaults, as well as a number of sculptures and lithography. Unfortunately, many of them were lost during World War II, such as the crucifixion in the Stella Maris church in Sliema.

The influence of Romanticism, which the artist became acquainted with in Naples, is evident in most of his early works, such as the painting of the altar of the parish church in Mosta, Our Lady of the Rosary (1870), his first work for churches after his return from Italy, and the Saint Lawrence (1881) and Saint Jerome (1882) in the Sacro Cuor church in Sliema. The latter is widely recognized as a masterpiece of the genre. This style is also visible in the works from 1885: Saint Joseph with Child for the parish church of St. Cajetan in Ħamrun and the Martyrdom of St. Demetrius for the parish church of Maria Bambina in Senglea. Calì has also done several works in collaboration with artist Carlo Ignazio Cortis, including for the Parish Church of St. Lawrence in Birgu and the Church of the Savior in Lija. At the end of the 19th century, he also worked on some side paintings, such as the one for the Church of the Annunciation in Tarxien, and the painting of Saint Dominic for the Porto Salvo parish church in Valletta, where he was baptized.

Calì has worked on many private home decoration assignments, including a series of four putti entitled The Four Seasons in the entrance hall of Villa Alhambra in Sliema, property of the architect Emanuele Luigi Galizia. He also had a great influence on Maltese society, he painted about fifty portraits of famous people in Malta. This should include the portraits of Cardinal Lavigerie (1884), Cardinal Logue (1886), as well as Governor Richard More O'Ferrall, Marquis Emanuele Scicluna, Giovanni Battista Schembri, Achille Camilleri, Edward V. Ferro, Sir Victor Houlton, Judge Sir Adrian Dingli, Rector of university Napoleone Tagliaferro, Pope Pius IX, Judge Paolo Debono, Count and Countess of Messina, and Lord and Lady Strickland.

=== List of works ===
The proscenium arch of the Teatru Salesjan in Sliema, Malta was decorated in 1910 with the reminiscent oil on stone painting entitled The Virtues of Mankind. The painting is surrounded by rich bas-relief, pre-art deco stucco decorations full of symbolism.

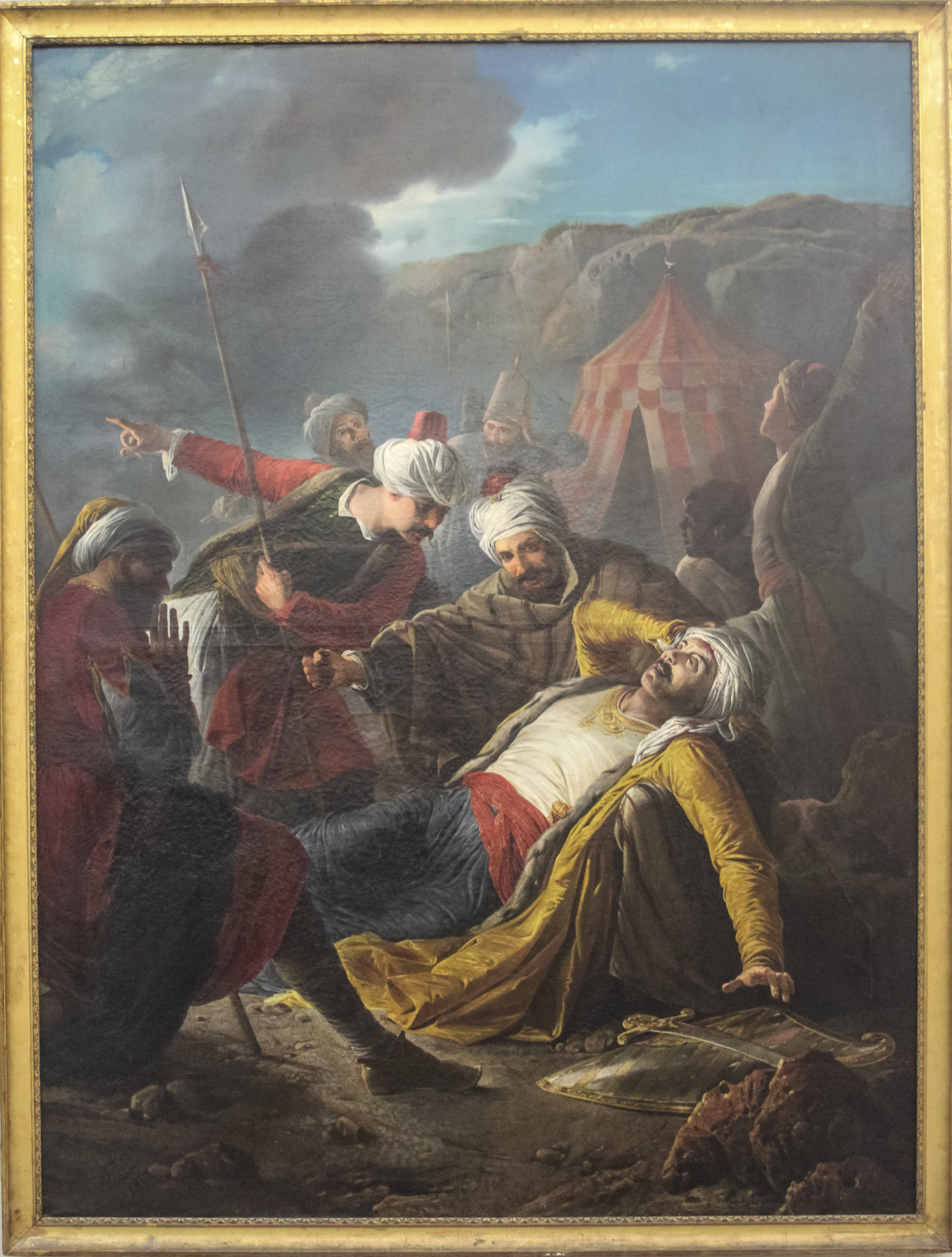
Death of Dragut by Giuseppe Calì.

- Death of Dragut (oil on canvas, 1867), widely considered his best work, now in the National Museum of Fine Arts, Valletta
- St Jerome and St Lawrence altarpieces (oil on canvas, 1881), Our Lady of the Sacred Heart Parish Church (Sacro Cuore), Sliema
- Virgin of the Rosary (his first work), and Prophets, and episodes from the life of Christ in the parish church of Mosta.
- St. Dominic altarpiece, Basilica of St Dominic, Valletta (Porto Salvo)
- portraits of the merchant Agostino Cassar Torregiani and of Judge Carbone
- Tre Rome (1911)
- Nativity of Jesus Christ, St Andrew's Parish Church, Luqa
- Saint Dominic, St Andrew's Parish Church, Luqa
- Saint Michael, St Andrew's Parish Church, Luqa
- Sacred Heart of Jesus (destroyed during World War II), St Andrew's Parish Church, Luqa
- Our Lady of the Rosary, St Andrew's Parish Church, Luqa
- Saint Paul and Saint Catherine V.M., St Andrew's Parish Church, Luqa
- Apotheosis of St. Francis, St Francis of Assisi Church, Valletta
- The Sacred Heart of Jesus, Fontana parish church, Fontana, Gozo
- The Assumption of Mary, Parish Church of the Assumption, Qrendi
- St. Lawrence Martyr, San Lawrenz parish, Gozo
- Main apse, minor chapel apse and St. Joseph, St Helen's Basilica, Birkirkara
- The Four Seasons - four putti in the entrance hall of Villa Alhambra, Sliema
- Woman carried by the sea, National Museum of Fine Arts, Valletta
- Untitled painting symbolising a martyrdom Casa Rocca Piccola

== Bibliography ==
- Dominic Cutajar, "The 19th Cent. Realism of Giuseppe Calì (1846-1930) - an artistic sway that lasted 50 years", in: Giuseppe Calì, edit. Edwin A. Camilleri, pub. Malta 1991
- E. Fiorentino, "Maltese art astride two centuries (1860-1921)" in V. Malta Milanes 9ed., The British Colonial Experience 1800-1964, pub, Mireva Publications, Malta 1988, pp. 263–265
- R. Bonnici Calì, Giuseppe Calì Centenary Exhibition 1846-1946, published Malta, 1946, p. 18.
- P. Ilario Dimech OFM, Le Pitture di Giuseppe Calì nelle Chiese dei Frati Minori Conventuali a Malta, pub. Malta, 1940, pp. 27–30
