= Death of Dragut =

1867 oil painting by Giuseppe Calì

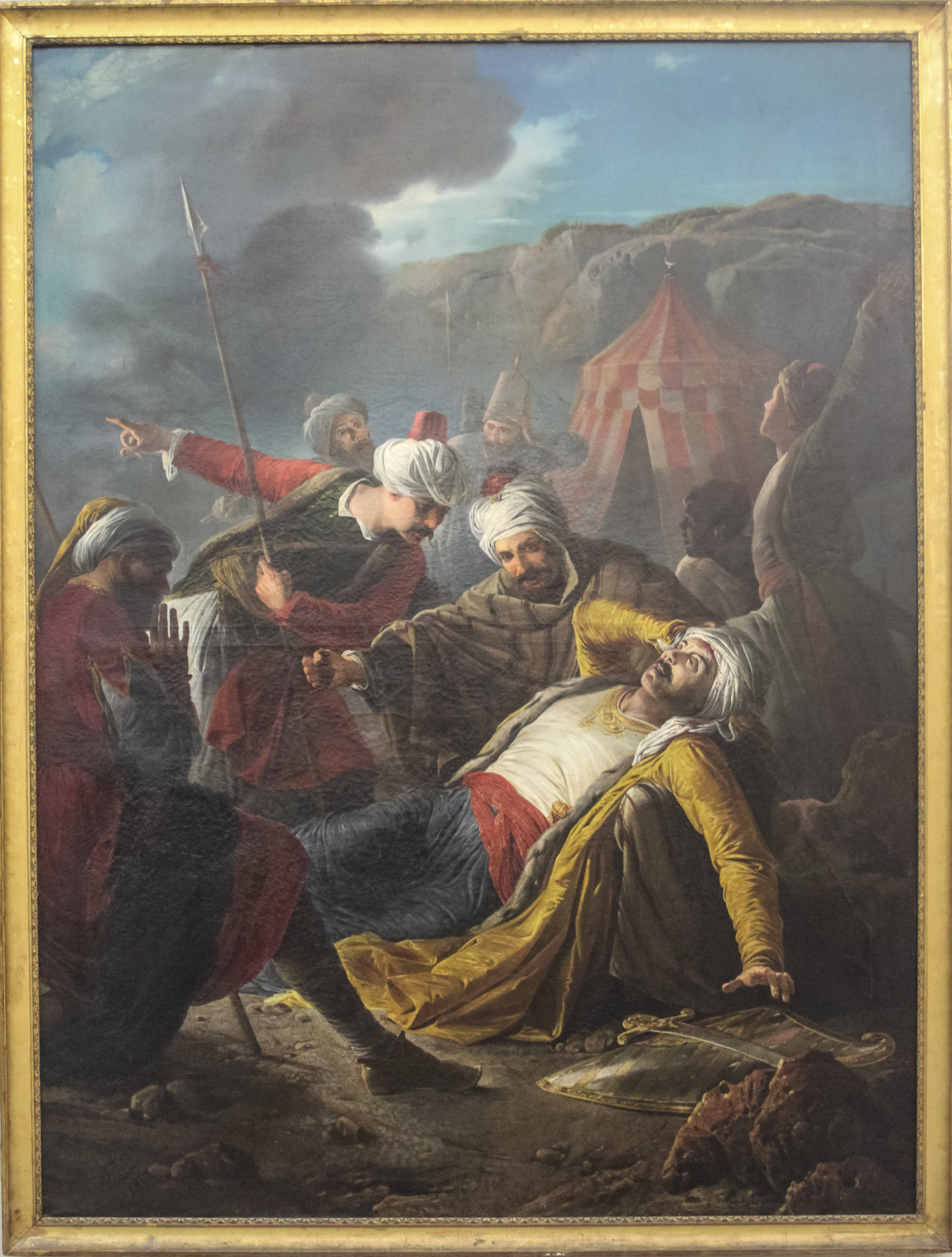
- Artist: Giuseppe Calì
- Year: 1867
- Medium: oil on canvas
- Dimensions: 225 cm × 170 cm (89 in × 67 in)
- Location: MUŻA, Valletta, Malta

Death of Dragut is an oil painting by the Maltese artist Giuseppe Calì, from 1867. It depicts the death of the Ottoman general Dragut during the Great Siege of Malta in 1565.

== Description ==
It measures 225 x 170 cm, and is in the collection of MUŻA in Valletta, Malta.

== Analysis ==
The painting was Calì's signature work. It depicts the episode during the Great Siege of Malta, when the Commander Dragut was fatally wounded. During bombardment of Fort St. Elmo, in June 1565, a shot from Fort St. Angelo, across the Grand Harbour, struck the ground close to the Turkish battery. However, conflicting views exist which hold that the fatal siege fire originated from within the Ottoman Encampment.

The painting shows the influence of Domenico Morelli, and Eugène Delacroix. It was painted in 1867, on Cali's return to Malta after his two years in Naples. It was bought by the Government.
