= Tour d'Elbo =

Genoese coastal defence tower in Corsica

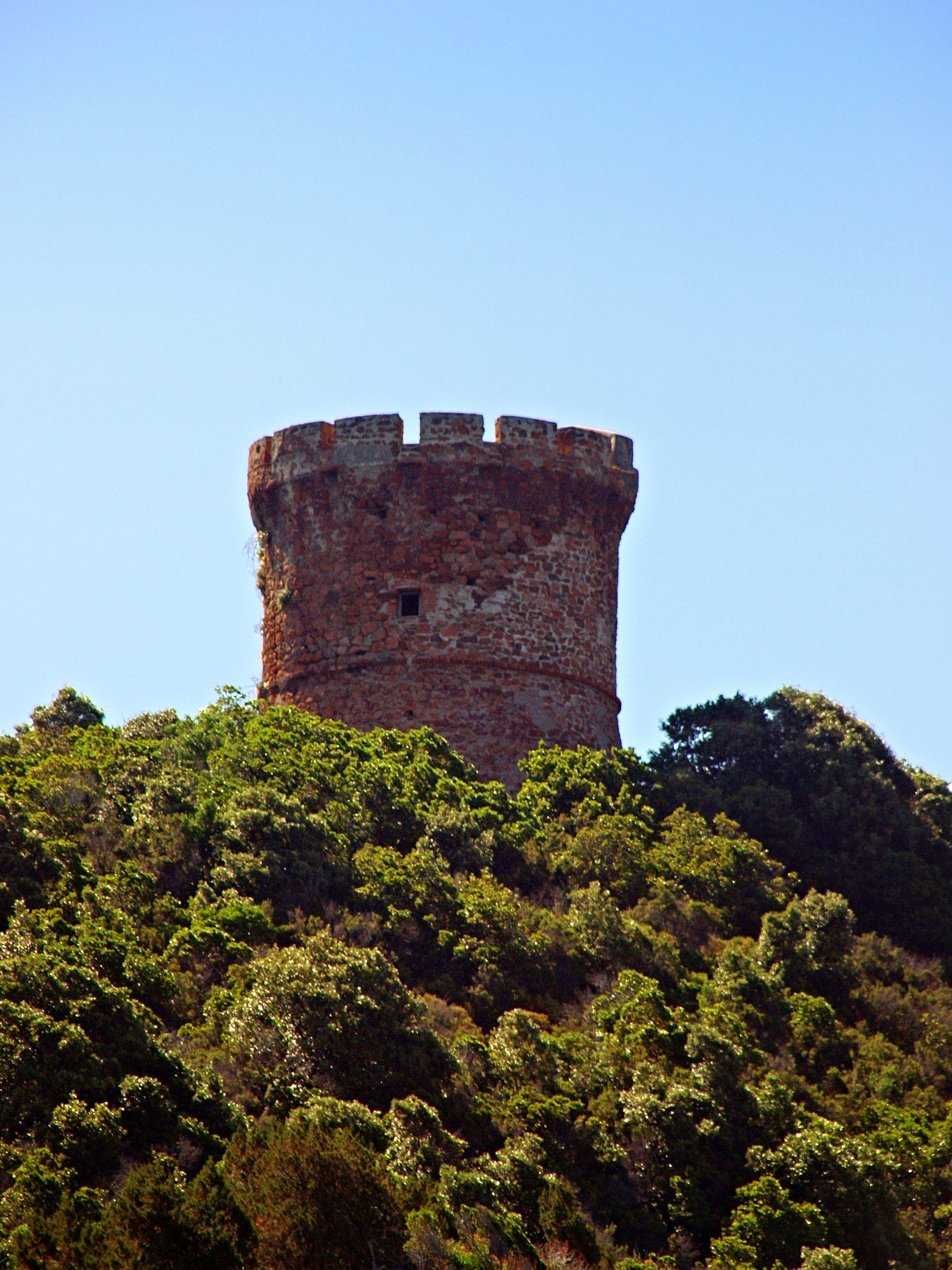

- Location within Corsica
- 42°22′18″N 8°34′25″E

History
- Built: Second half 16th century

The Tour d'Elbo (Corsican: Torra d'Elbo) is a ruined Genoese tower located in the commune of Osani on the west coast of the French island of Corsica. The tower lies just outside the boundary of the Scandola Nature Reserve.

The tower was one of a series of coastal defences constructed by the Republic of Genoa between 1530 and 1620 to stem the attacks by Barbary pirates.

== See also ==
- List of Genoese towers in Corsica
