= Turgutreis =

- Neighbourhood
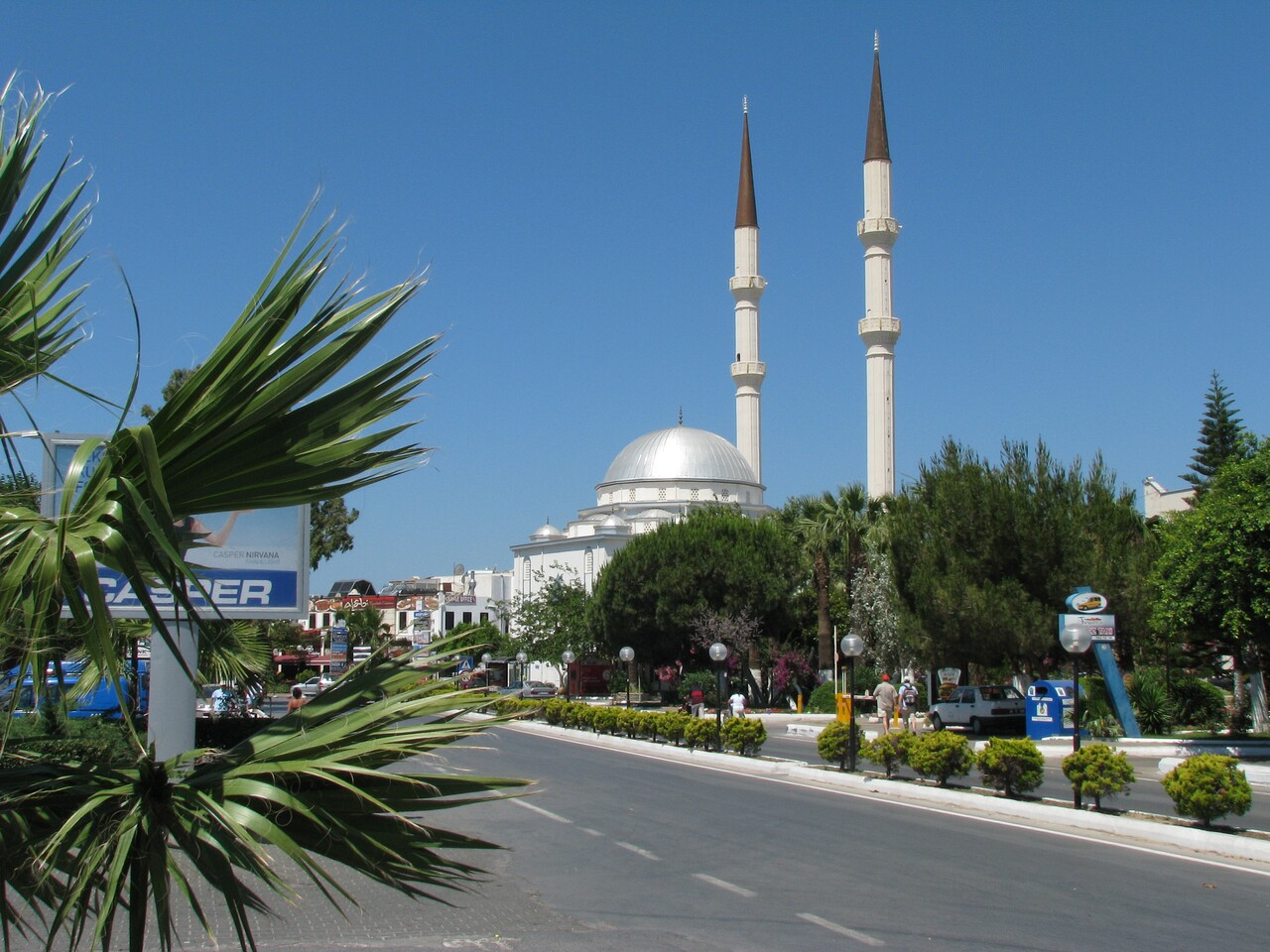

- Location within Turkey Location within Turkey Aegean
- Coordinates: 37°01′N 27°16′E
- Country: Turkey
- Province: Muğla
- District: Bodrum
- Population (2022): 6,041
- Time zone: UTC+3 (TRT)
- Postal code: 48400
- Area code: 0252

Turgutreis is a neighbourhood of the municipality and district of Bodrum, Muğla Province, Turkey. Its population is 6,041 (2022). Before the 2013 reorganisation, it was a town (belde). It is the second largest town on the Bodrum peninsula. The town is a popular holiday destination with 5 kilometres of sandy beaches, waterfront restaurants and bars, and is considered a resort town.

The town is named after the Ottoman admiral Turgut Reis who was born there in 1485. Also known as Dragut, Turgut Reis was famous for his expeditions on the coasts of Spain, France, Italy, and North Africa, and for his participation in the Ottoman siege of Malta, in which he was killed. There is a memorial to Turgut Reis a few kilometres from the town centre, located in Sabanci Park. The town was formerly named Karatoprak before being renamed in Turgut Reis's honour in 1972.

The coastline consists of several inlets, with steep mountains running parallel to the coast. There are 14 Turkish islets around Turgutreis including Küçük Kiremit, Büyük, Fener, Çatal, Yassı, Tüllüce, Kargı, Köçek, Kadıkalesi, and Sarıat, as well as the bigger Greek islands of Kos and Kalimnos. The town has a marina which provides access to the nearby Greek island of Kos via ferry.

== Famous residents ==
- Burhan Doğançay

== See also ==
- Tourism in Turkey
- Turkish Riviera
- Blue Cruise
- Marinas in Turkey
- Foreign purchases of real estate in Turkey

== Gallery ==
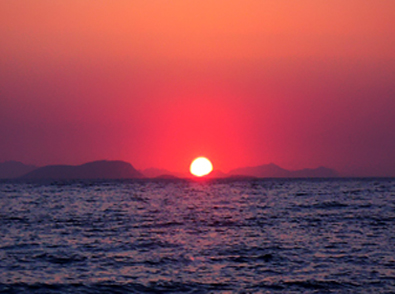
A fiery sunset taken in Turgutreis, Turkey

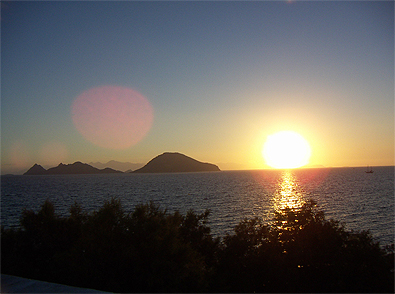
Golden sunset taken in Turgutreis, Turkey

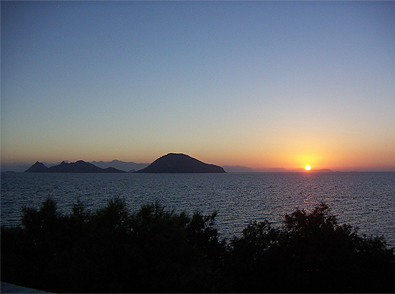
Golden sunset taken in Turgutreis, Turkey

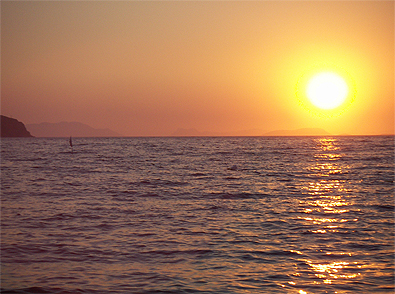
Golden sunset taken in Turgutreis, Turkey

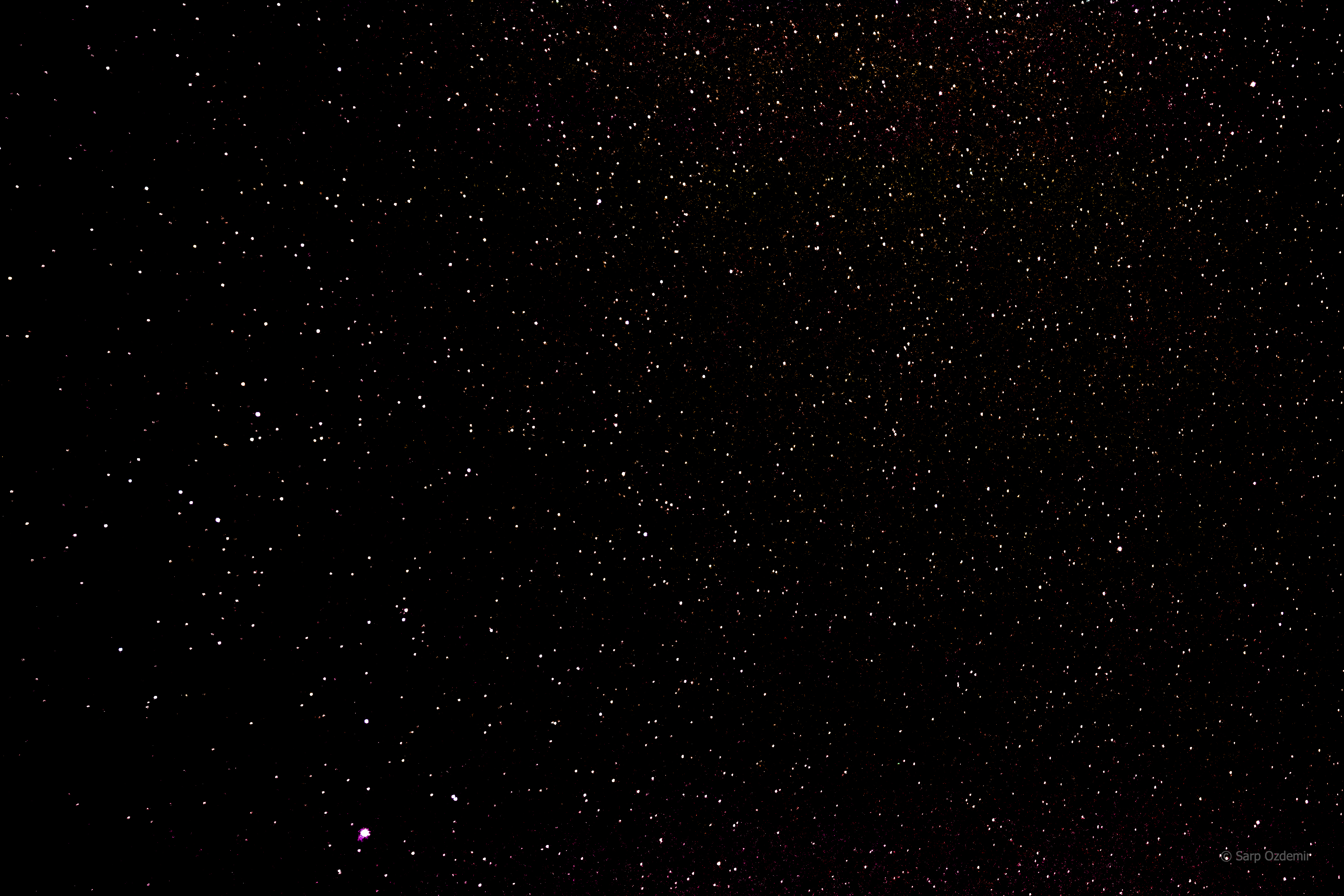
A nighttime view of the Turgutreis sky and its many constellations, away from urban light pollution. Nebulas and deep sky objects are also slightly visible.
