= Tour de Girolata =

Genoese coastal defence tower in Corsica

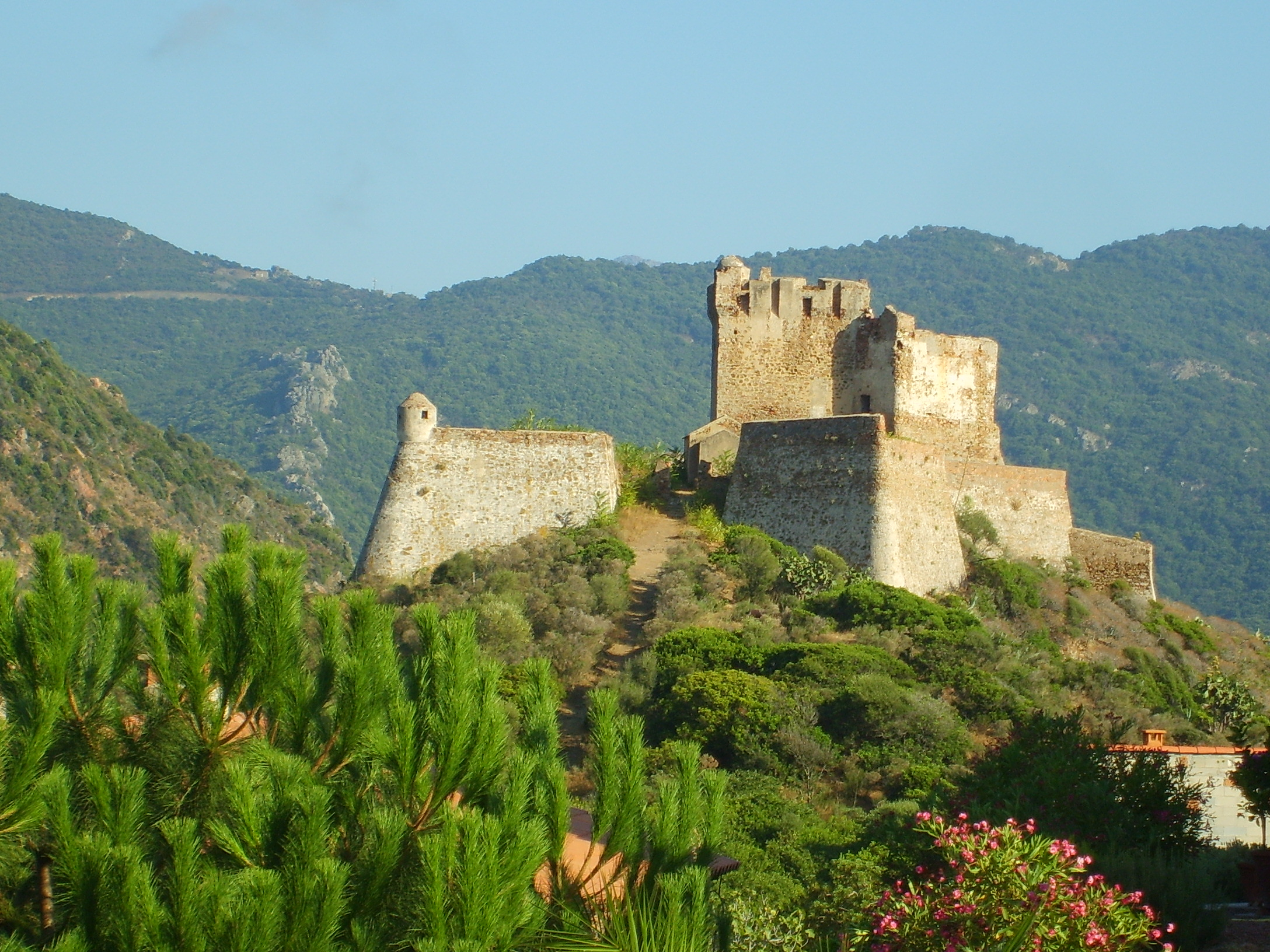

- Location within Corsica
- 42°20′51″N 8°36′46″E

History
- Built: 1551-1552

Monument historique
- Designated: 11 April 2008
- Reference no.: PA2A000003

The Tour de Girolata or Fortin de Girolata (Corsican: Torra di Girolata) is a Genoese tower located in the commune of Osani (Corse-du-Sud) on the west coast of the French island of Corsica. The tower sits at an elevation of 36 metres (118 ft) on a rocky outcrop in the Golfe de Girolata.

The tower was built between 1551 and 1552. The construction was initially supervised by Gieronimo da Levanto but on his death he was replaced by Giovan Battista de'Franchi. The tower was one of a series of coastal defences constructed by the Republic of Genoa between 1530 and 1620 to stem the attacks by Barbary pirates. In 2008 it was listed as one of the official historical monuments of France.

The tower is not open to the public. Since 2009 it has been owned by a French government agency, the Conservatoire du littoral. The agency plans to purchase 937 hectares (2,320 acres) of the land around the Golfe de Girolata and by 2011 had acquired 64 hectares (160 acres).

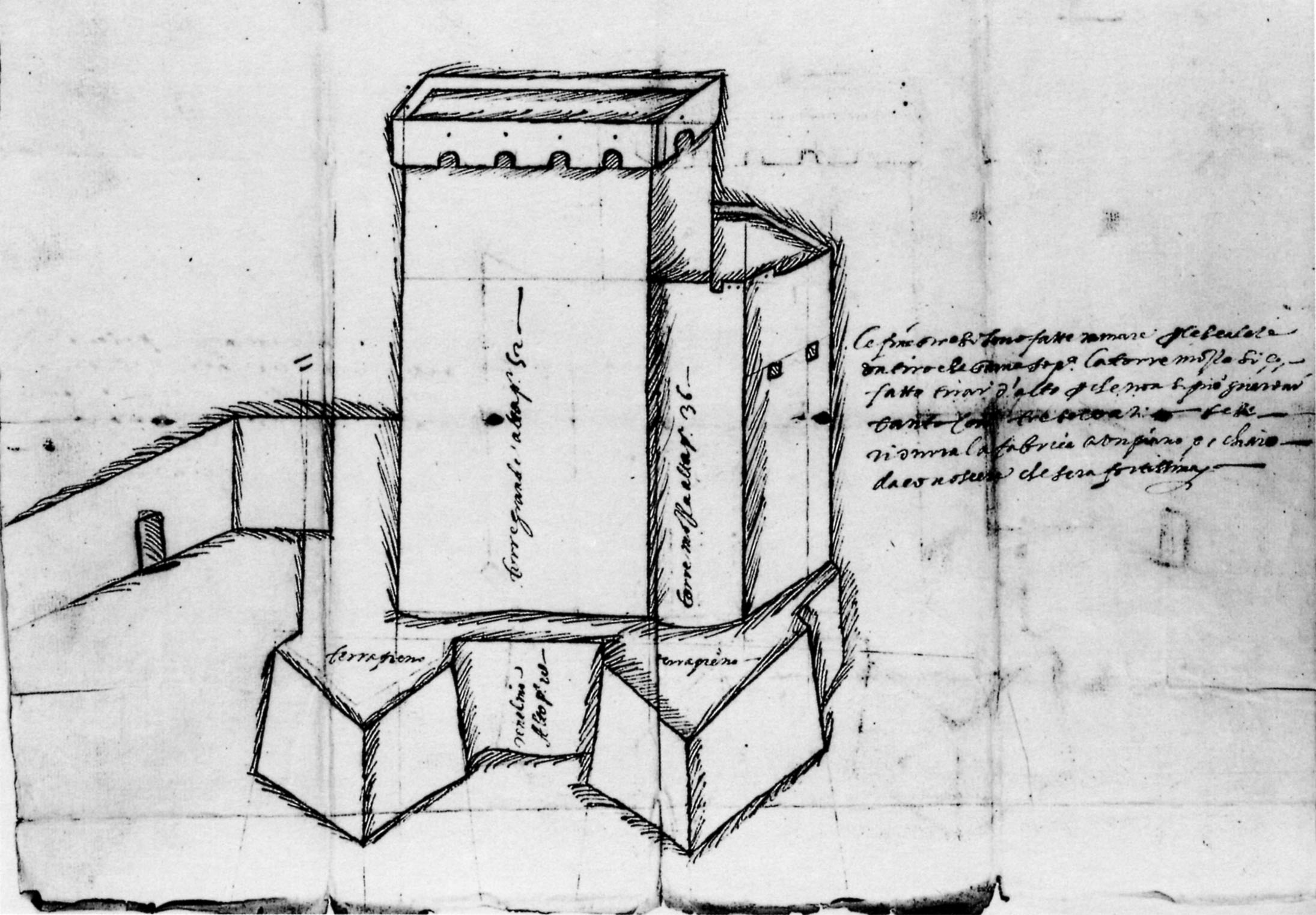
Drawing of the tower from the Genoese archives dating from the 1590s

== See also ==
- List of Genoese towers in Corsica
