= Osani =

Commune in Corsica, France

- Commune
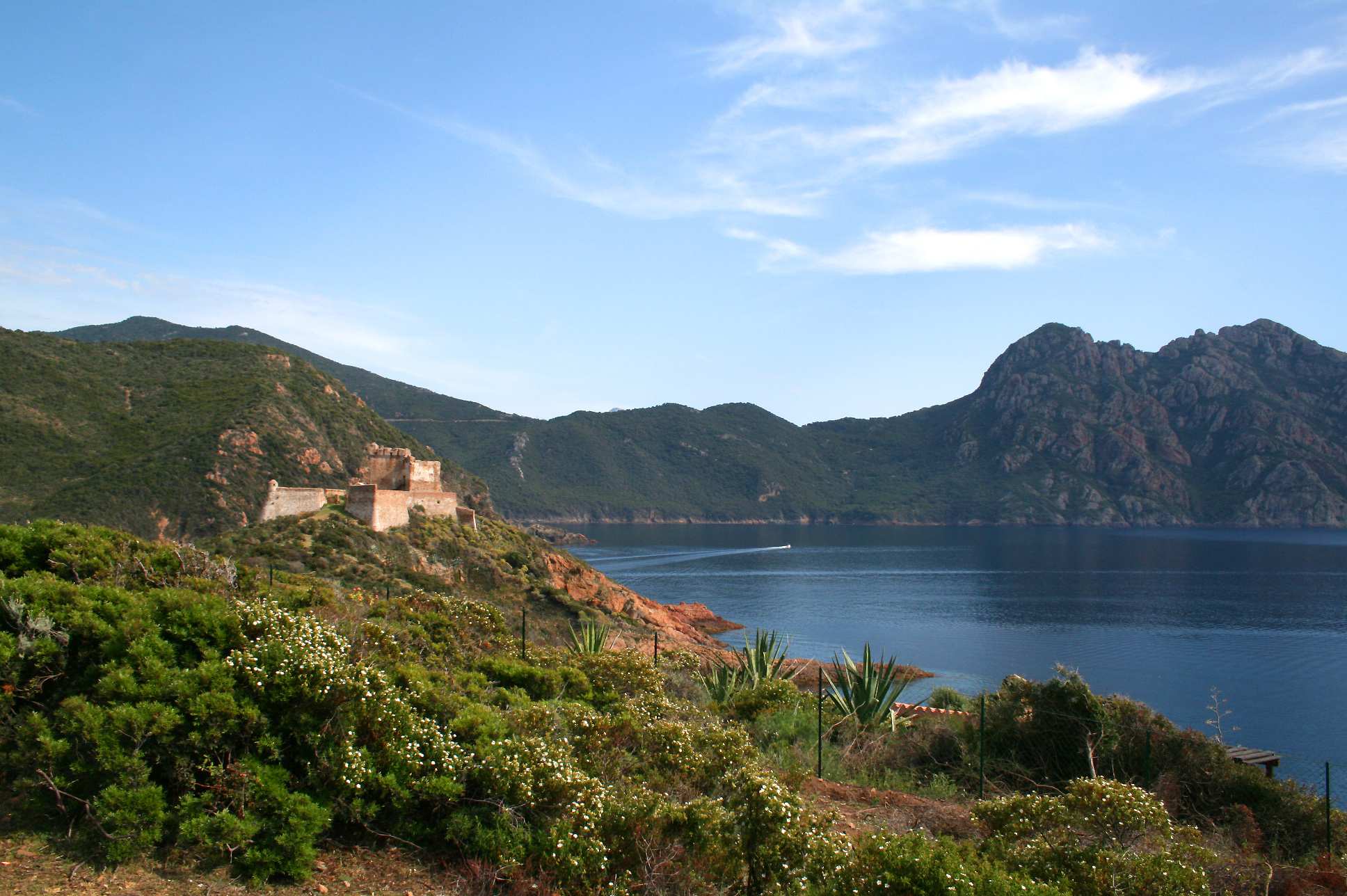
- The Genoese fortress and the Gulf of Girolata
- Location of Osani
- Location within France Location within Corsica
- Coordinates: 42°19′28″N 8°37′58″E
- Country: France
- Region: Corsica
- Department: Corse-du-Sud
- Arrondissement: Ajaccio
- Canton: Sevi-Sorru-Cinarca

Government
  - Mayor (2020–2026): Gisèle Colonna-Pan
- Area^{1}: 51.53 km^{2} (19.90 sq mi)
- Elevation: 100 m (330 ft)
- Highest elevation: 927 m (3,041 ft)
- Lowest elevation: 0 m (0 ft)
- Population (2023): 96
  - Density: 1.9/km^{2} (4.8/sq mi)
- Time zone: UTC+01:00 (CET)
  - Summer (DST): UTC+02:00 (CEST)
- INSEE/Postal code: 2A197 /20147
- ^{1} French Land Register data, which excludes lakes, ponds, glaciers > 1 km^{2} (0.386 sq mi or 247 acres) and river estuaries.

Osani (French pronunciation: [ozani]) is a commune in the Corse-du-Sud department on the western coast of Corsica, France. Located within the Natural Park of Corsica and near the UNESCO-listed Gulf of Porto, the village lies at the foot of Cape Senino. With a population of 95 as of 2022, Osani is known for its remote hamlets and historical traces of coal mining.

== Geography and location ==
Osani is a commune located on the western side of the Natural Park of Corsica, in the Corse-du-Sud department of France on the island of Corsica. To the south is the Gulf of Porto, a UNESCO World Heritage Site. It is situated at the foot of Cape Senino, one of Europe's highest capes, reaching 618 metres. The village itself rests on a hill, with a small road providing access to the sea and Gradelle beach, 4 kilometres away.

The commune of Osani comprises three hamlets. Curzu features old granite houses and a church, and serves as a point of interest for hikers on the Mare et Monti nord trail. The most renowned of the hamlets is Girolata, located on the Gulf of Girolata. This hamlet is uniquely accessible either by a path originating from the Col de la Croix or by sea. Evidence of past coal mining activity, which ceased in 1974 due to low yield, can still be found in the area, with shafts remaining at Cardella, Murato, and Sperone. The mined coal was historically transported and evacuated via Gradelle beach.

== Demographics ==
As of 2022, the commune of Osani had an estimated population of 95 residents, spread across an area of 51.53 square kilometers. This results in a very low population density of approximately 1.84 inhabitants per square kilometer. Between 2015 and 2022, Osani experienced a slight population decline, with an average annual decrease of 0.30%.

According to 2021 estimates, the population was slightly male-dominated, with 53.6% men (52 individuals) and 46.4% women (45 individuals). The age distribution indicates a mature population: 6.2% were under 18 years of age, 55.7% were between 18 and 64, and a significant 38.1% were aged 65 or older.

In terms of nationality, the vast majority of residents (96.9%) held French citizenship, while 3.1% were foreign nationals. The immigrant population was small, comprising just 5.2% of the total.

Historical population
Year	Pop.	±% p.a.
1968	184	—
1975	175	−0.71%
1982	121	−5.13%
1990	103	−1.99%
1999	90	−1.49%
2007	102	+1.58%
2012	104	+0.39%
2017	97	−1.38%
2023	96	−0.17%
Source: INSEE

== Genoese towers ==
- Torra d'Elbu
- Torra di Girolata
- Torra di l'Isula di Gargali

== See also ==
- Communes of the Corse-du-Sud department
