= 1539 =

1539 in various calendars
- Gregorian calendar: 1539; MDXXXIX
- Ab urbe condita: 2292
- Armenian calendar: 988; ԹՎ ՋՁԸ
- Assyrian calendar: 6289
- Balinese saka calendar: 1460–1461
- Bengali calendar: 945–946
- Berber calendar: 2489
- English Regnal year: 30 Hen. 8 – 31 Hen. 8
- Buddhist calendar: 2083
- Burmese calendar: 901
- Byzantine calendar: 7047–7048
- Chinese calendar: 戊戌年 (Earth Dog); 4236 or 4029 — to — 己亥年 (Earth Pig); 4237 or 4030
- Coptic calendar: 1255–1256
- Discordian calendar: 2705
- Ethiopian calendar: 1531–1532
- Hebrew calendar: 5299–5300
- Hindu calendars
- Vikram Samvat: 1595–1596
- Shaka Samvat: 1460–1461
- Kali Yuga: 4639–4640
- Holocene calendar: 11539
- Igbo calendar: 539–540
- Iranian calendar: 917–918
- Islamic calendar: 945–946
- Japanese calendar: Tenbun 8 (天文８年)
- Javanese calendar: 1457–1458
- Julian calendar: 1539; MDXXXIX
- Korean calendar: 3872
- Minguo calendar: 373 before ROC 民前373年
- Nanakshahi calendar: 71
- Thai solar calendar: 2081–2082
- Tibetan calendar: ས་ཕོ་ཁྱི་ལོ་ (male Earth-Dog); 1665 or 1284 or 512 — to — ས་མོ་ཕག་ལོ་ (female Earth-Boar); 1666 or 1285 or 513

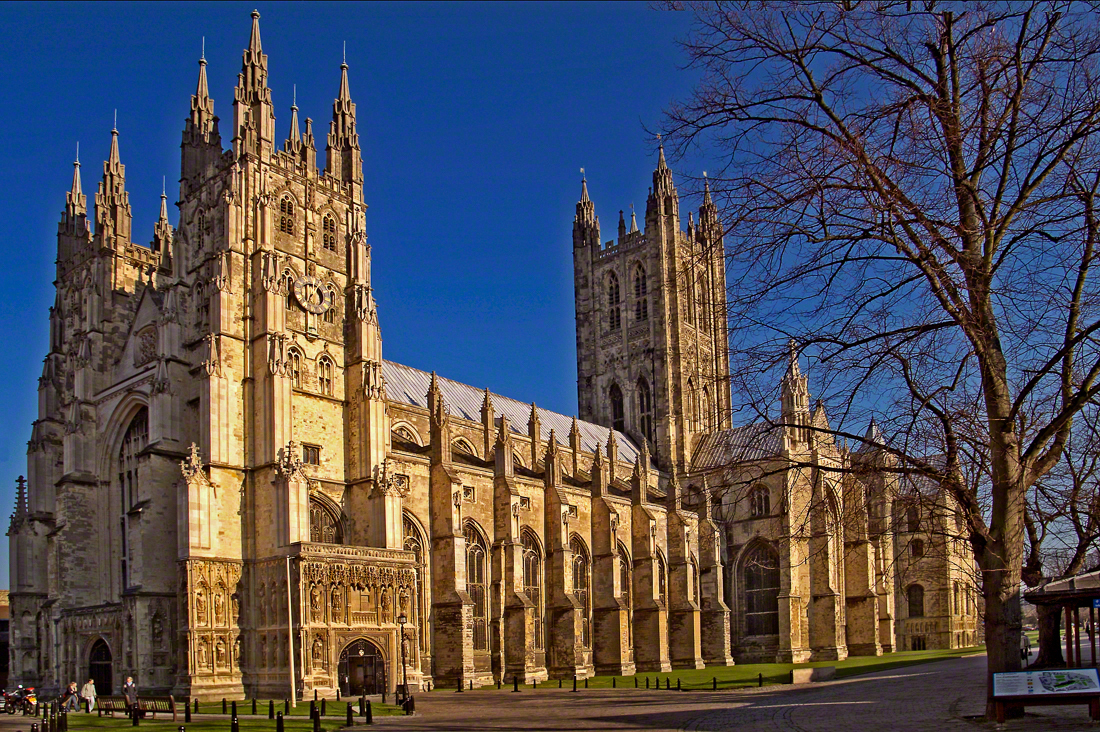
March 30: Canterbury Cathedral surrenders to English governmental control.

Year 1539 (MDXXXIX) was a common year starting on Wednesday of the Julian calendar.

== Events ==
=== January–March ===
- January 4 – Giannandrea Giustiniani Longo is elected to a two year term as Doge of the Republic of Genoa in Italy, succeeding Giovanni Battista Doria.
- January 12 – Treaty of Toledo: Charles V, Holy Roman Emperor (aka Charles I of Spain) and Francis I of France agree to make no further alliances with England. The treaty comes after Henry VIII of England's split with Rome and Pope Paul III.
- January – Toungoo–Hanthawaddy War – Battle of Naungyo, Burma: The Toungoos decisively defeat the Hanthawaddys.
- February 9 – The first horse race is held at Chester Racecourse, the oldest still in use in England.
- March 1 – King Henry VIII of England summons Parliament to meet, with the session to start on April 28.
- March 2 – Askia Isma'il, ruler of the Songhai Empire in West Africa, dies after a reign of slightly less than two years and is succeeded by Askia Ishaq I.
- March 30 – Canterbury Cathedral surrenders, and reverts to its previous status of 'a college of secular canons.

=== April–June ===
- April 17 – At Dresden in Germany, Heinrich IV of the House of Wettin, nicknamed "Heinrich der Fromme" (Henry the Pious) becomes the new Duke of Saxony within the Holy Roman Empire upon the death of his older brother, Georg der Bärtige ("George the Bearded").
- April 19 – The Treaty of Frankfurt is signed at Frankfurt-am-Main by Charles V, Holy Roman Emperor on behalf of the Empire's Roman Catholic states, and the Lutheran theologian Philip Melanchthon, representative of the Schmalkaldic League of Protestant German states. Effective May 1, the parties agree that no violent actions will be taken by either side against the other during a 15 month truce period.
- April 28 – The English Parliament meets for the first time since 1536, after being summoned by King Henry VIII as his seventh Parliament.
- May 5 – The English House of Lords creates a committee, balanced between religious reformers and religious conservatives, to examine and determine doctrine, eventually forming the "Six Articles".
- May 25 – The inaugural declaration of the Protestant Reformation takes place in Leipzig (now part of Germany) with Martin Luther present, as Duke Henry IV pledges to adopt Lutheranism as the official religion of make the Duchy of Saxony.
- May 30 – Hernando de Soto lands at Tampa Bay, Florida with 600 soldiers, with the goal of finding gold. He also introduces pigs into North America.
- June 26 – Battle of Chausa in modern-day Buxar, India: Sher Shah Suri defeats the Mughal emperor, Humayun (Sher Shah goes on to form the Sur Empire, and take control of nearly all Mughal territory).
- June 28 – The Six Articles, an Act of the Parliament of England, is given royal assent reaffirms certain Catholic principles in Henry VIII's Church of England.

=== July–September ===
- July 13 – Lütfi Pasha becomes the new Grand vizier of the Ottoman Empire after being appointed by the Sultan Suleiman the Magnificent following the death of Ayas Mehmed Pasha
- July 18 – The siege of Castelnuovo (now the town of Herceg Novi in Montenegro) is started by General Hayreddin Barbarossa, leader of the Ottoman Empire's Army, after the Spanish commanding officer, Francisco de Sarmiento, rejects an offer of honorable surrender with safe passage. Spain had taken the city in war from the Ottomans in 1538, giving the Christian Europeans control of the eastern Mediterranean sea and access to the Holy Land. With 50,000 Ottomans against less than 4,000 Spanish defenders, Castelnuovo falls in less than three weeks.
- The siege of Castelnuovo ends after 19 days and the deaths of as many as 20,000 of the Ottoman attackers. After the city falls, almost all of the surviving Spanish defenders are executed, including Spain's General de Sarmiento.
- August 15 – King Francis I of France issues the Ordinance of Villers-Cotterêt, that places the whole of France under the jurisdiction of the royal law courts, and makes French the language of those courts, and the official language of legal discourse.
- August 17 – The revolt of Ghent begins in the Spanish Netherlands (now Belgium) as members of the city's guilds demand the right to choose their own leaders, and the resignation of the Spanish-sponsored city leaders. Within four days, the city is under the control of nine guild leaders.
- September 7 – Guru Angad Dev becomes the second Guru of the Sikhs.

=== October–December ===
- October 4 – Henry VIII contracts to marry Anne of Cleves.
- November 1 – Joachim II Hector introduces Lutheranism in the Margraviate of Brandenburg, becoming the second Prince-Elector after the Prince-Elector of Saxony to turn Protestant.
- November 26 – Abbot Marmaduke Bradley and 31 monks sign the deed surrendering Fountains Abbey to the English Crown.
- December 7 – Juan Pardo de Tavera, Archbishop of Toledo, begins his administration as the Grand Inquisitor of Spain.
- December 15 – In the Spanish colony of Nueva Granada (now the Republic of Colombia, Spanish conquistador Baltasar Maldonado and his troops fight a final battle at Duitama (now the Boyacá Department) against the indigenous armies of the Muisca Confederation, led by Tundama.
- December 27 – Anne of Cleves arrives in England in fulfillment of the October 4 contract for marriage to King Henry VIII and the payment of a dowry of 100,000 florins to her brother. Anne and Henry are married 10 days later, but the marriage is annulled on July 12.

=== Undated ===
- Protestant Reformation
  - Lutheranism is forcibly introduced into Iceland, despite the opposition of Bishop Jón Arason.
  - Beaulieu Abbey, Bolton Abbey, Colchester Abbey, Newstead Abbey, St Albans Abbey, St Mary's Abbey, York and Hartland Abbey (the last) fall prey to the Dissolution of the monasteries in England.
  - The first edition of the Calvinist Genevan Psalter is published.
- In Henan province, China, a severe drought with swarms of locusts is made worse, by a major epidemic outbreak of the plague.
- The first printing press in North America is set up in Mexico City.
- Teseo Ambrogio's Introductio in Chaldaicam lingua, Syriaca atq Armenica, & dece alias linguas, published in Pavia, introduces several Middle Eastern languages to western Europe for the first time.

== Births ==
Franciscus Raphelengius

- January 28 – Nicolò Donato, Doge of Venice (d. 1618)
- February 13 – Elisabeth of Hesse, Electress Palatine by marriage (1576–1582) (d. 1582)
- February 23
  - Henry XI of Legnica, thrice Duke of Legnica (d. 1588)
  - Salima Sultan Begum, Empress of the Mughal Empire as a wife of Emperor Akbar (d. 1613)
- February 27 – Franciscus Raphelengius, Dutch printer (d. 1597)
- March 5 – Christoph Pezel, German theologian (d. 1604)
- March 18 – Maria of Nassau, Countess of Nassau (d. 1599)
- April 5 – George Frederick, Margrave of Brandenburg-Ansbach (d. 1603)
- April 6 – Amalia of Neuenahr, German noble (d. 1602)
- April 7
  - Tobias Stimmer, Swiss artist (d. 1584)
  - Strange Jørgenssøn, Norwegian businessman (d. 1610)
- April 30 – Archduchess Barbara of Austria, Austrian archduchess (d. 1572)
- May 22 – Edward Seymour, 1st Earl of Hertford (d. 1621)
- May 29 – Thomas Pounde, English Jesuit lay brother (d. 1613)
- June 6 – Catherine Vasa, Regent of East Frisia (1599–1610) (d. 1610)
- June 13 – Jost Amman, Swiss printmaker (d. 1591)
- June 23 – William Darrell of Littlecote, English politician (d. 1589)
- July 4 – Louis VI, Elector Palatine (d. 1583)
- September 18 – Louis Gonzaga, Duke of Nevers, Italian-French dignitary and diplomat (d. 1595)
- October 1 – Peter Vok, Czech noble (d. 1611)
- November 1 – Pierre Pithou, French lawyer and scholar (d. 1596)
- December 5 – Fausto Paolo Sozzini, Italian theologian (d. 1604)
- December 20 – Paulus Melissus, German composer (d. 1602)
- December 31 – John Radcliffe, English politician (d. 1568)
- date unknown
  - José Luis Carvajal y de la Cueva, Portuguese explorer (d. 1590)
  - Hasegawa Tōhaku, Japanese painter (d. 1610)
  - Laurence Tomson, English Calvinist (d. 1608)
  - Humphrey Gilbert, English adventurer, explorer, member of Parliament and soldier (d. 1583)

== Deaths ==
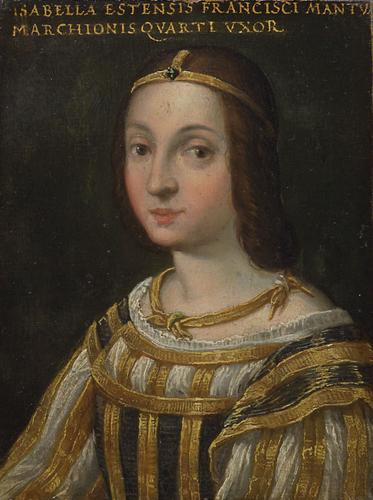
Isabella d'Este

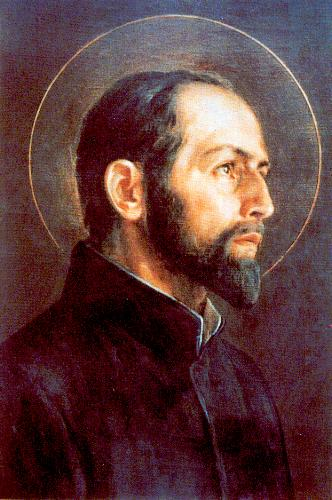
Saint Anthony Maria Zaccaria

- January 24 – Anneke Esaiasdochter, Dutch Anabaptist writer (b. 1509)
- February – Narapati of Prome, king of Prome in Burma.
- February 6 – John III, Duke of Cleves (b. 1491)
- February 13 – Isabella d'Este, Marquise of Mantua (b. 1474)
- March 5 – Nuno da Cunha, Portuguese governor in India (b. 1487)
- March 12 – Thomas Boleyn, 1st Earl of Wiltshire, English diplomat and politician (b.1477)
- March 19 – Lord Edmund Howard, English nobleman (b. c. 1478))
- April 17 – George, Duke of Saxony (b. 1471)
- April 19 – Katarzyna Weiglowa, Jewish martyr (b. 1460)
- April 30 – John Bourchier, 1st Earl of Bath, English noble (b. 1470)
- May 1 – Isabella of Portugal, Holy Roman Empress (b. 1503)
- May 7 – Ottaviano Petrucci, Italian printer (b. 1466)
- May 7 or September 22 – Guru Nanak, founder of Sikhism (b. 1469)
- June 20 – Philip III, Count of Waldeck-Eisenberg (1524–1539) (b. 1486)
- July 5 – St Anthony Maria Zaccaria, Italian saint (b. 1502)
- July 9 – Adrian Fortescue, English Roman Catholic martyr (b. 1476)
- August – Vannoccio Biringuccio, Italian metallurgist (b. 1480)
- September 8 – John Stokesley, English prelate (b. 1475)
- November 14 – Hugh Cook Faringdon, English Abbot of Reading
- December 12 – Bartolomeo degli Organi, Italian musician (b. 1474)
- December 20 – Johannes Lupi, Flemish composer (b. c. 1506)
- date unknown
  - James Beaton, Scottish church leader (b. 1473)
  - Cura Ocllo, Inca queen
