= Giovanni Doria =

Giovanni Doria may refer to:

- Giovanni Battista Doria (born 1487)
- Giovanni Andrea Doria (1539–1606), Italian admiral from Genoa
  - Giovanni Doria (bishop) (1573–1642)
- Giovanni Carlo Doria (1576–1625), Genoan art collector and mecenas
