= Giovanni Carlo Doria =

Genoan art collector and patron

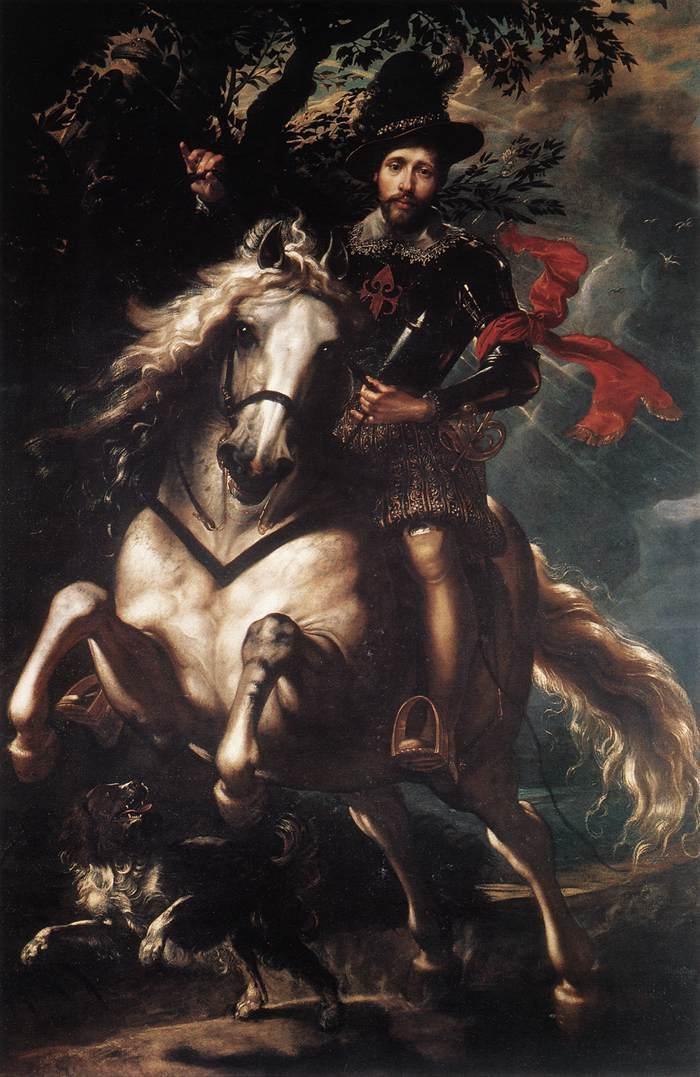
Portrait of Giovanni Carlo Doria on Horseback by Rubens, 1606

Giovanni Carlo Doria (1576–1625) (also Gio, Gian, or Giovan) was an Italian art collector and mecenas, citizen of Republic of Genoa. A son of Agostino Doria, doge of Genoa in 1601-1603, he was a prominent member of one of the richest and most influential families of the Republic of Genoa; his brother Giovanni Stefano Doria (1578-1641) became the 101st doge of Genoa (1633-1635) and was considered the richest man in Italy in his day. Giovanni Carlo was married to Veronica Spinola, daughter of Ambrogio Spinola. He was given the Order of Santiago by Philip III of Spain.

His collection of 463 paintings was partly legated to this elder brother Marcantonio Doria (born 1572) after the death of Giovanni, and elements of it would stay in the possession of the family for centuries. Three inventories of the collection are known, one from 1617, a revised one from ca. 1621, and one from after his death in 1625.

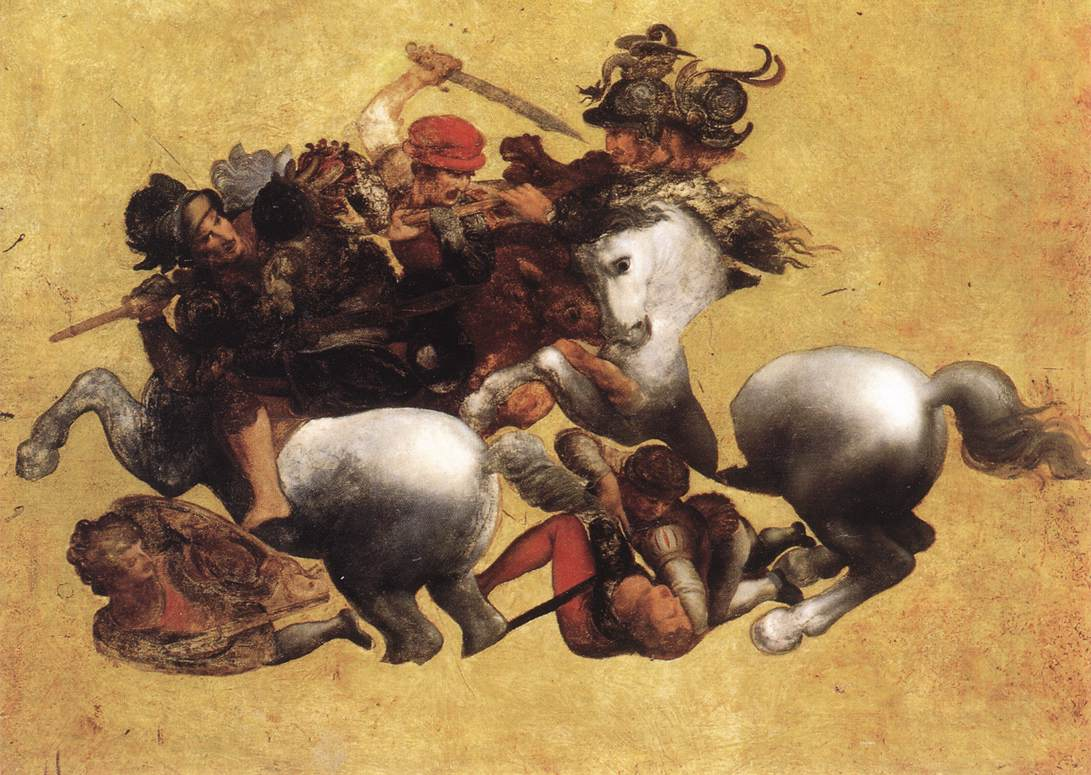
"Tavola Doria" by Leonardo da Vinci, now in the Uffizi

One piece in it is a "Cavalry Battle" by Leonardo da Vinci, now known as the "Tavola Doria" and considered a copy by Leonardo of part of his own lost "Battle of Anghiari" fresco.

Other painters represented in his collection included works by Northern artists like Jan Brueghel I, Jan Brueghel II, Antony van Dyck, Lucas van Leyden, and Jan Wildens, but also some older Italian artists like the portrait of his uncle Nicolò Doria by Jacopo Tintoretto, and works by Giorgione, Perugino, Raphael, Titian, and Veronese.

His portrait was painted by Peter Paul Rubens in 1606. The same year Rubens painted a seated portrait of his wife Veronica as well. In the 1620s, Simon Vouet was employed by Doria and among a number of large-scale paintings also made a portrait of him, which now resides in the Louvre. He also ordered paintings from Giulio Cesare Procaccini and Giovanni Battista Paggi and was a patron for young artists like Giulio Benso.

Doria founded the Genoese Accademia del Nudo in his own palazzo in Genoa.

== Bibliography ==
- Godart, Louis (2012). La Tavola Doria (in Italian). Mondadori. ISBN 9788852032639.
