= Pietro Durazzo =

Pietro Durazzo may refer to:

- Pietro Durazzo (1560–1631), Doge of Genoa
- Pietro Durazzo (1632–1699), Doge of Genoa
