= Portrait of Giovanni Carlo Doria on Horseback =

1606 painting by Peter Paul Rubens

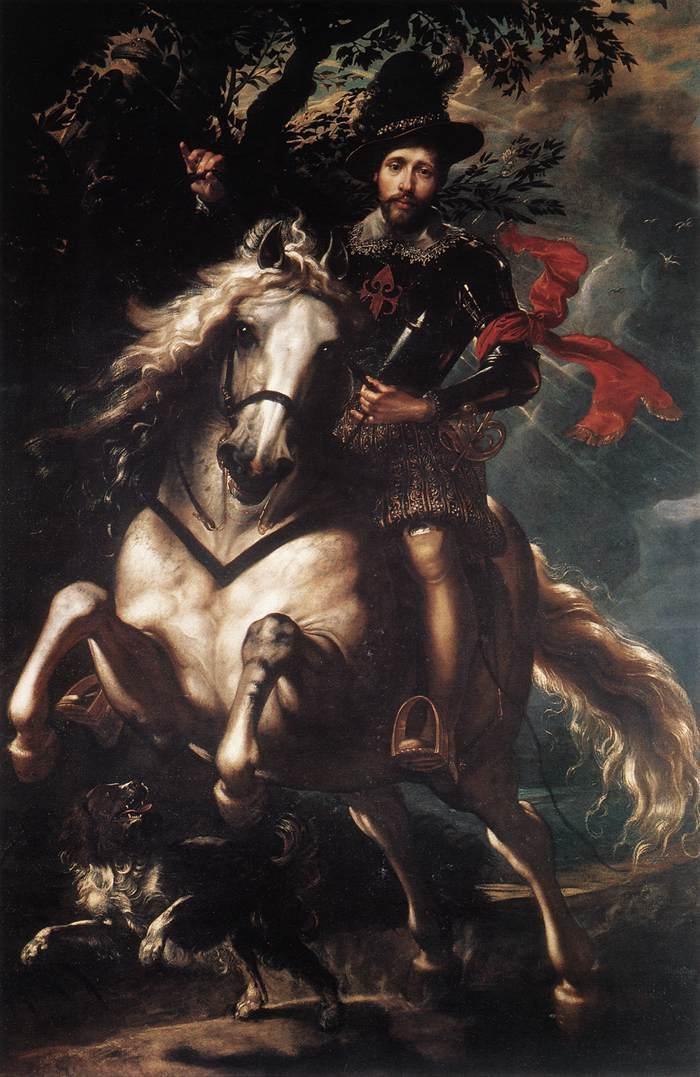
Portrait of Giovanni Carlo Doria on Horseback (1606) by Rubens

The Portrait of Giovanni Carlo Doria on horseback is a 1606 painting by Peter Paul Rubens. It shows Giovanni Carlo Doria, son of doge Agostino Doria, at the age of 30. The painting is now held in the Galleria Nazionale di Palazzo Spinola in Genoa. It was moved to Naples in 1940 and acquired by Adolf Hitler on the suggestion of Benito Mussolini, and was then returned to Italy after the end of World War II.

The red cruciform sword symbol on Giovanni Carlo Doria's cuirass identifies him as a member of the Spanish Order of Saint James of Compostela. While the painting was painted between 1606 and 1607, Doria did not become a member of the order until 1610. This means that either the symbol was either added at a later date, or Doria commissioned the painting with the symbol before he was officially made a member of the order while Rubens was still in Genoa.
