= Virginia Centurione Bracelli =

Italian Roman Catholic saint

Saint Virginia Centurione Bracelli
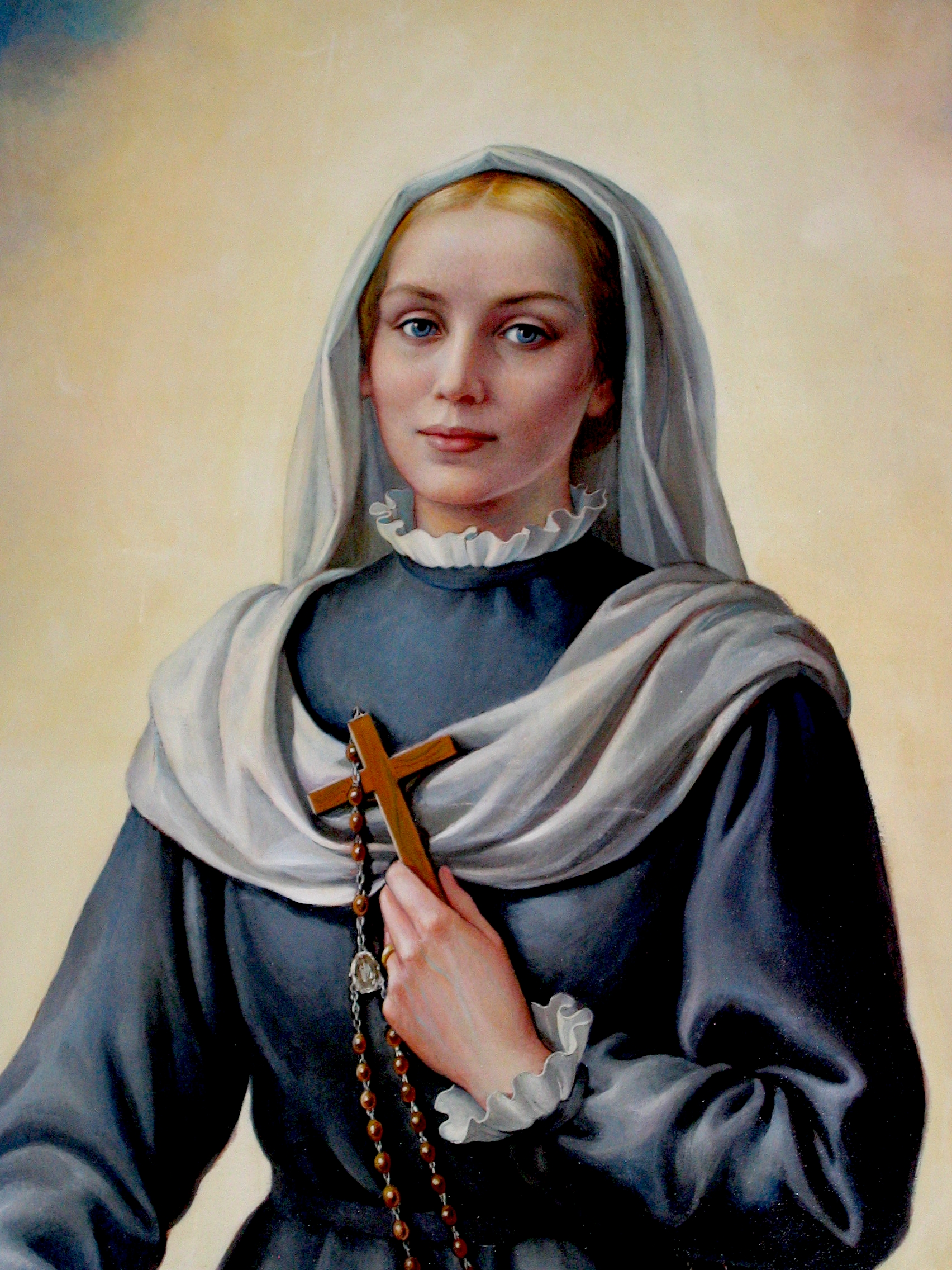
- Portrait of Virginia Centurione Bracelli

Religious
- Born: 2 April 1587; Genoa, Republic of Genoa
- Died: 15 December 1651 (aged 64); Genoa, Republic of Genoa
- Venerated in: Roman Catholic Church
- Beatified: 22 September 1985, Saint Peter's Square, Vatican City by Pope John Paul II
- Canonized: 18 May 2003, Saint Peter's Square, Vatican City by Pope John Paul II
- Feast: 15 December
- Patronage: Sisters of Our Lady of Refuge in Mount Cavalry

Virginia Centurione Bracelli (Ligurian: Virginnia Çentrioña, 2 April 1587 – 15 December 1651) was an Italian noblewoman from Genoa. Her father was the Doge of Genoa, and she had a short marriage due to being widowed in 1607. She is venerated as a saint in the Catholic Church.

== Life ==
Virginia Centurione was born on 2 April 1587 in Genoa and was of noble origins. She was the daughter of Giorgio Centurione (who was the Doge of Genoa from 1621 to 1623) and Lelia Spinola.

Despite her desire to live a cloistered life, she was forced into marriage to Gaspare Grimaldi Bracelli, who was a rich noble, on 10 December 1602. She had two daughters: Lelia and Isabella. The marriage did not last long, for she became a widow on 13 June 1607 at the age of 20. She refused another arranged marriage brought on due to her father's influence and took up a vow to live a celibate life.

After her husband's death she began charitable works and assisted the poor and the sick. To help alleviate the poverty in her town she founded the "Cento Signore della Misericordia Protettrici dei Poveri di Gesù Cristo". The center was soon overrun with people suffering from the famine and plague of 1629–30 and soon she had to rent the Monte Calvario convent to accommodate all the people that came in. She created a community which was dedicated to Our Lady of Refuge, but this was later split into two congregations: the Sisters of Our Lady of Refuge in Mount Calvary, and the Daughters of Our Lady on Mount Calvary.

Around 1635 the center was caring for over 300 patients and received recognition as a hospital from the government. Due to declining funds given from the middle and upper classes the institute lost its government recognition in 1647. Bracelli spent the remainder of her life acting as a peacemaker between noble houses and continuing her work for the poor.

Bracelli died on 15 December 1651 at the age of 64.

The work of the Sisters of Our Lady of Refuge in Mount Calvary continued into the 21st century, with sisters working on helping the sick, elderly and poor in hospitals, as well as working with young people in Nicaragua, the Dominican Republic and India.

== Sainthood ==
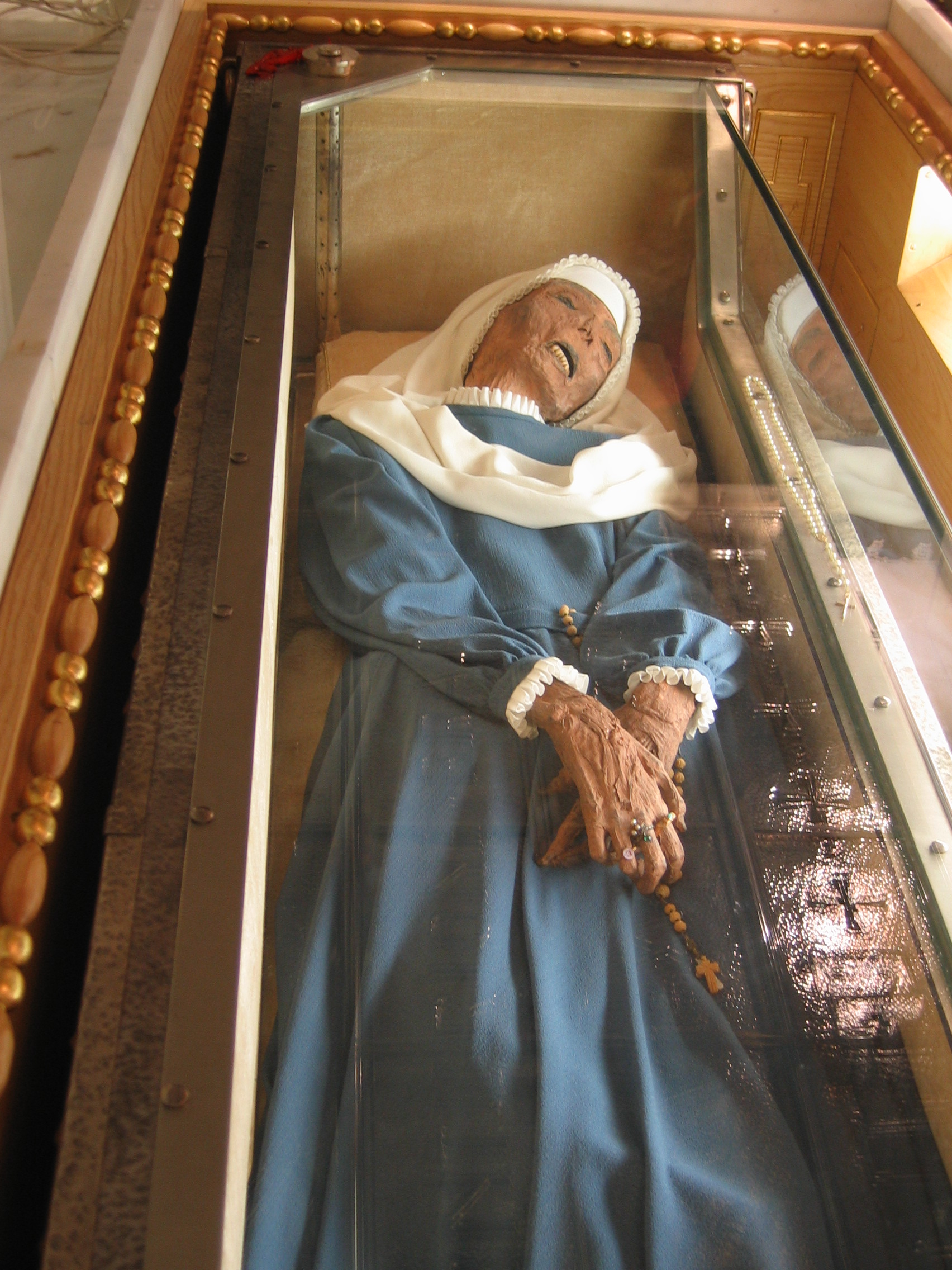
The remains of Saint Virginia Centurione found to be incorrupt.

The informative process for the canonization cause commenced on 28 April 1933 and finished its set business in 1957. Theologians approved all of her writings to be in line and respective of the faith in a decree dated 10 April 1959. Historians were tasked to assess whether the cause had obstacles that would impede it and make the process difficult. But the historians cleared it on 1 December 1971 and allowed for the cause to proceed.

The formal introduction of the cause came on 7 January 1977 under Pope Paul VI in which she was accorded the title of Servant of God as the first official stage of the proceedings. An apostolic process was held after this while both processes were validated in Rome so that the Congregation for the Causes of Saints could commence their own investigation. Theologians approved the cause on 18 October 1983 while the C.C.S. approved it on 20 March 1984. On 7 April 1984 she was made Venerable when Pope John Paul II confirmed her heroic virtue.

Bracelli was beatified on 22 September 1985 and was later canonized on 18 May 2003.

== See also ==
- Sagar Diocese, Sisters of Our Lady of Refuge of Mount Calvary
- Daughters of Our Lady on Mount Calvary
