= Pietro De Franchi Sacco =

Doge of the Republic of Genoa

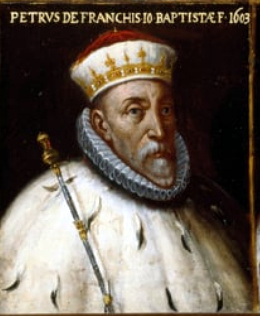

84th Doge of the Republic of Genoa
- In office 26 February 1603 – 27 February 1605
- Preceded by: Agostino Doria
- Succeeded by: Luca Grimaldi De Castro

Personal details
- Born: 1545 Genoa, Republic of Genoa
- Died: 5 April 1611 (aged 65–66) Genoa, Republic of Genoa

Pietro De Franchi Sacco (1545, Genoa – 5 April 1611, Genoa) was the 84th Doge of the Republic of Genoa.

== Biography ==
The name of Pietro De Franchi Sacco was chosen on 26 February 1603 for the leadership of the Republic, the thirty-ninth in two-year succession and the eighty-fourth in republican history. His Dogate was evaluated by the Genoese chronicles as quiet and "normal administration". However, there were significant episodes such as a sudden night terrestrial attack by some soldiers of the Duchy of Savoy, which was promptly repressed by Genoese troops or the sending of four galleys, in 1604, to the rescue of Onorato Grimaldi in Monaco to defend against an offensive launched by Carlo Emanuele I of Savoy; therefore, there were inevitably open conflicts between the Genoese Republic and the Duchy of Savoy.

In this two-year period the Genoese capital saw the birth of numerous public works: a new tower at the dock, the construction of a hospice for Corsican soldiers, the renovation in 1603 of the great hall of the Doge's Palace, the authorization of the route of the New Road from the door of San Tommaso to the Piazza dell'Annunziata. In the religious field, he approved the foundation of a new female order (the Order of the Turchine) and donated on behalf of the Republic a new organ for the Cathedral of San Lorenzo. After the mandate ended, on 27 February 1605, he was appointed perpetual prosecutor. The former doge died in Genoa on 5 April 1611.

== See also ==
- Republic of Genoa
- Doge of Genoa
