= Tomaso Spinola =

Doge of the Republic of Genoa (1557–1631)

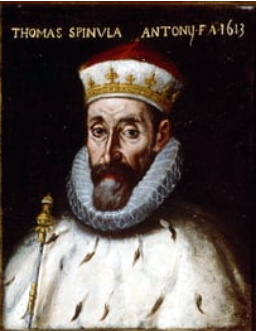

90th Doge of the Republic of Genoa
- In office April 21, 1613 – April 21, 1615
- Preceded by: Alessandro Giustiniani Longo
- Succeeded by: Bernardo Clavarezza

Personal details
- Born: 1557 Genoa, Republic of Genoa
- Died: 1631 (aged 73–74) Genoa, Republic of Genoa

Tomaso Spinola (Genoa, 1557 - Genoa, 1631) was the 90th Doge of the Republic of Genoa.

== Biography ==
According to the annals of the Republic, the Dogate of Tomaso Spinola was somewhat peaceful and of ordinary administration. However, on 11 November 1614, he had to face a severe storm that conspicuously damaged the Port of Genoa by providing for the necessary reconstruction works of the piers and docks. The mandate ended on April 21, 1615, and he was subsequently elected as perpetual prosecutor. Spinola died in Genoa in 1631.

== See also ==
- Republic of Genoa
- Doge of Genoa
- House of Spinola
