= Ambrogio Doria =

Doge of the Republic of Genoa

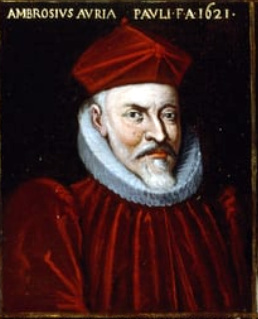

94th Doge of the Republic of Genoa
- In office 4 May 1621 – 12 June 1621
- Preceded by: Pietro Durazzo
- Succeeded by: Giorgio Centurione

Personal details
- Born: 1550 Genoa, Republic of Genoa
- Died: 12 June 1621 (aged 70–71) Genoa, Republic of Genoa

Ambrogio Doria (Genoa, 1550 - Genoa, 12 June 1621) was the 94th Doge of the Republic of Genoa.

== Biography ==
Member of the powerful Doria family, he was the son of Paolo Doria and Tommasina Grimaldi. The appointment in 1621 to the Dogate, the forty-ninth in biennial succession and the ninety-fourth in Genoese republican history, was aroused by the sudden brain stroke that led the new doge Ambrogio Doria to death, in Genoa, on 12 June that year. Doria was married to Gerolama Centurione and had three children: Paolo Francesco, Maria and Paola.

== See also ==
- Republic of Genoa
- Doge of Genoa
