= Sisters of Our Lady of Refuge in Mount Cavalry =

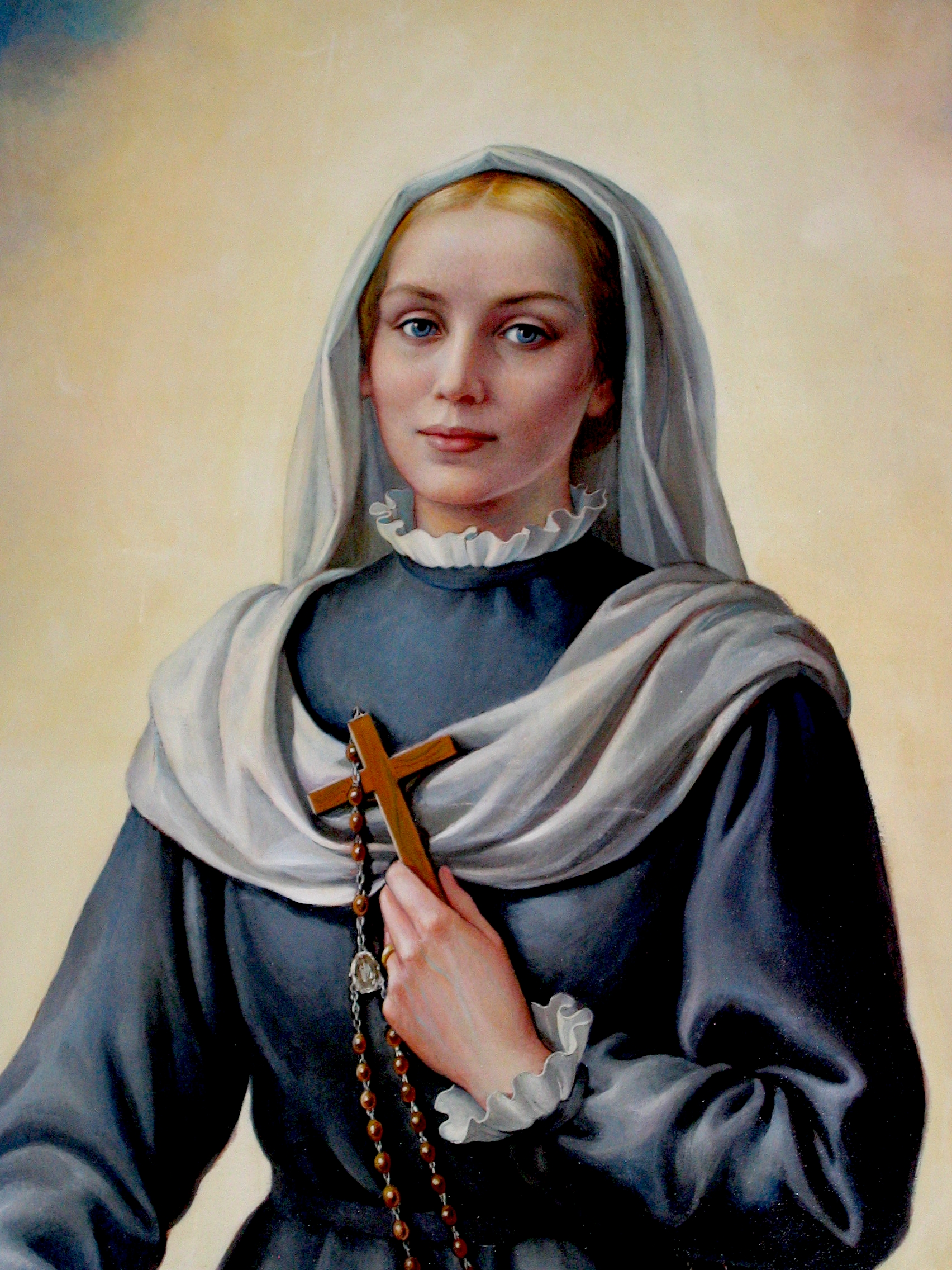
Virginia Centurione Bracelli, founder of the congregation.

The Sisters of Our Lady of Refuge in Mount Calvary (Latin: Sororum Dominae Nostrae a Refugio in Monte Calvario) are a religious congregation in Genoa, Italy.

It was founded in 1631 by Virginia Centurione Bracelli. Bracelli created a community which was dedicated to Our Lady of Refuge, but this was later split into two congregations: the Sisters of Our Lady of Refuge in Mount Calvary, and the Daughters of Our Lady on Mount Calvary.

In 2003, when Bracelli was canonized, the congregation were focusing most of their work on helping, the sick, elderly and poor in hospitals, as well as working with young people in Nicaragua, the Dominican Republic and India.

The congregation is also known as the Brignoline Sisters.
