= Silvestro Invrea =

Doge of the Republic of Genoa

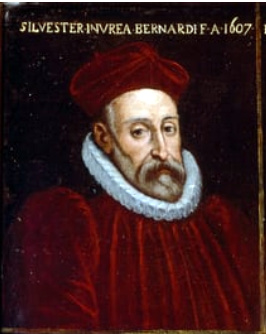

86th Doge of the Republic of Genoa
- In office March 3, 1607 – March 17, 1607
- Preceded by: Luca Grimaldi De Castro
- Succeeded by: Gerolamo Assereto

Personal details
- Born: 1530 Genoa, Republic of Genoa
- Died: March 17, 1607 (aged 76–77) Genoa, Republic of Genoa

Silvestro Invrea (Genoa, 1530 - Genoa, 17 March 1607) was the 86th Doge of the Republic of Genoa.

== Biography ==
Silvestro Invrea was elected to the highest dogal position with the elections of March 3, 1607, the forty-first in two-year succession and the eighty-sixth in republican history. His dogate passed to the annals for the brevity of the mandate, only 14 days, the shortest after the reform of 1528 and in any case in the history of the doges of Genoa. Already in poor health, he assisted on the morning of the election to the praise of the Dean, only to then retire to his rooms without ever, in fact, ruling one day in the guise of doge. He died on March 17 and there was not even time for the usual and official coronation, an episode that was the first in the history of the Republic of Genoa.

== See also ==
- Republic of Genoa
- Doge of Genoa

== Sources ==
- Buonadonna, Sergio. Rosso doge. I dogi della Repubblica di Genova dal 1339 al 1797.
