= Lorenzo Sauli =

Doge of the Republic of Genoa

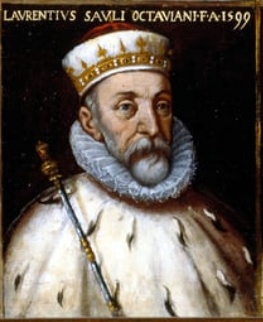

82nd Doge of the Republic of Genoa
- In office 22 February 1599 – 21 February 1601
- Preceded by: Lazzaro Grimaldi Cebà
- Succeeded by: Agostino Doria

Personal details
- Born: 1535 Genoa, Republic of Genoa
- Died: 1601 (aged 65–66) Genoa, Republic of Genoa

Lorenzo Sauli (1535 in Genoa – 1601 in Genoa) was the 82nd Doge of the Republic of Genoa.

During his dogate Sauli had to face firsthand the issue related to the Marquisate of Finale, a small western Ligurian state linked to the Del Carretto family, and always in the expansionist aims of Genoa for its strategic and economic importance. The dogate ceased on 21 February 1601. Lorenzo Sauli died assassinated in the same year by Genesio Gropallo, son of a wool weaver, who under the dogate of Agostino Doria was beheaded together with his cousin Gio Girolamo Rosso considered his accomplice.

== See also ==
- Republic of Genoa
- Doge of Genoa

== Sources ==
- Buonadonna, Sergio. Rosso doge. I dogi della Repubblica di Genova dal 1339 al 1797.
