= Tokyo Fuji Art Museum =

Art museum in Tokyo, Japan

- 東京富士美術館
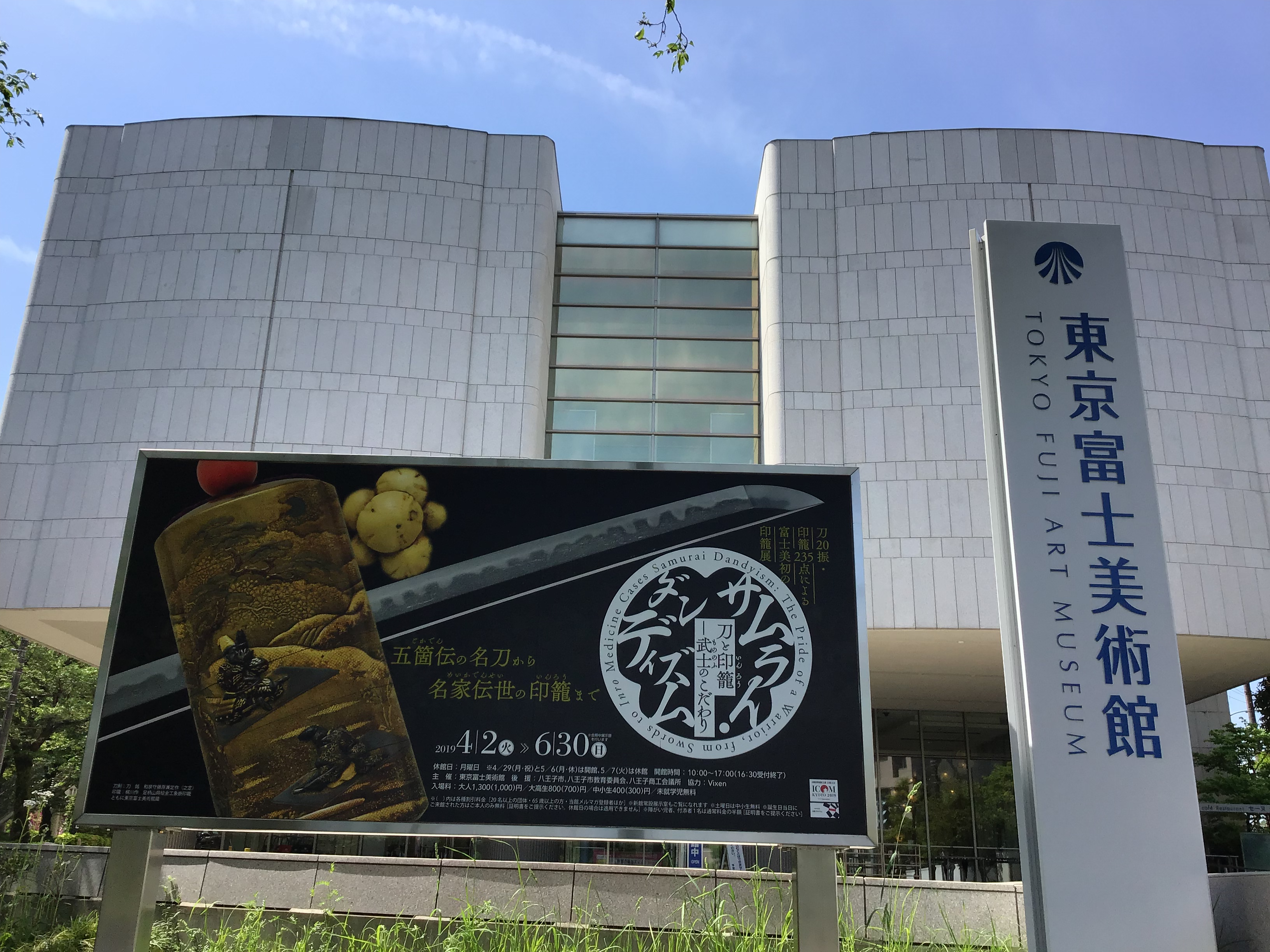
- Interactive fullscreen map

General information
- Location: 492-1 Yano-machi, Hachiōji, Tokyo, Japan
- Coordinates: 35°41′11″N 139°19′46″E
- Opened: 3 November 1983

Website
- Official website

Tokyo Fuji Art Museum (東京富士美術館, Tōkyō Fuji Bijutsukan) was established by Daisaku Ikeda and opened in Hachiōji, Tokyo, Japan, in 1983. A new wing was added in 2008.

The Fuji Art Museum is owned by the Sôka Gakkai, a buddhist movement which runs several museums.

== The Collections ==
=== Budget ===
The Tokyo Fuji Art Museum, operating as a private foundation closely affiliated with Sōka Gakkai, sustains its operations and acquisitions primarily through donations from the organization's members.

These contributions, channeled via the group's centralized structure, have enabled substantial investments in artworks. Soka Gakkai spent an estimated Y20-30 billion of yens on art each year at the beginning of the '90s. But the museum's financials remain non-public, with no evidence of taxpayer funding or audited operational transparency.

The collection gathers thirty thousand works spans the arts and cultures of Japan, Asia, and Europe, and the Museum takes touring exhibitions to other countries.

=== Looted art ===
The Tavola Doria, a Renaissance masterpiece attributed to Leonardo da Vinci, was stolen in Italy in the '60s, and acquired by the museum in 1992. The Italian government had to lead tight negotiations with the museum, which eventually agreed to return the da Vinci panel in 2012.

In 2015, an American lawyer contacted the museum about a painting by British painter Joshua Reynolds, stolen in the UK in 1984, and bought by the museum years later. The Fuji Art Museum legally refused to return the painting to the owner, and asked for a one million pound compensation.

=== Renoir case ===
In 1990, the museum acquired two paintings by Pierre-Auguste Renoir as part of a deal brokered by Mitsubishi Corporation at approximately $30 million, raising suspicions of inflated valuations used for tax evasion purposes. The museum, affiliated with the Soka Gakkai organization, subsequently withdrew the works from exhibition amid the probe, reflecting broader concerns over opaque pricing in high-value art transactions during Japan's economic bubble era. "Tax authorities say prices on the paintings were manipulated to help one or more of the parties save on taxes", said a Los Angeles Times article investigating the case in 1991.

In a related development, the affiliated group settled by paying approximately $4.5 million in back taxes, though no criminal charges were specified against the museum itself.

== Gallery ==
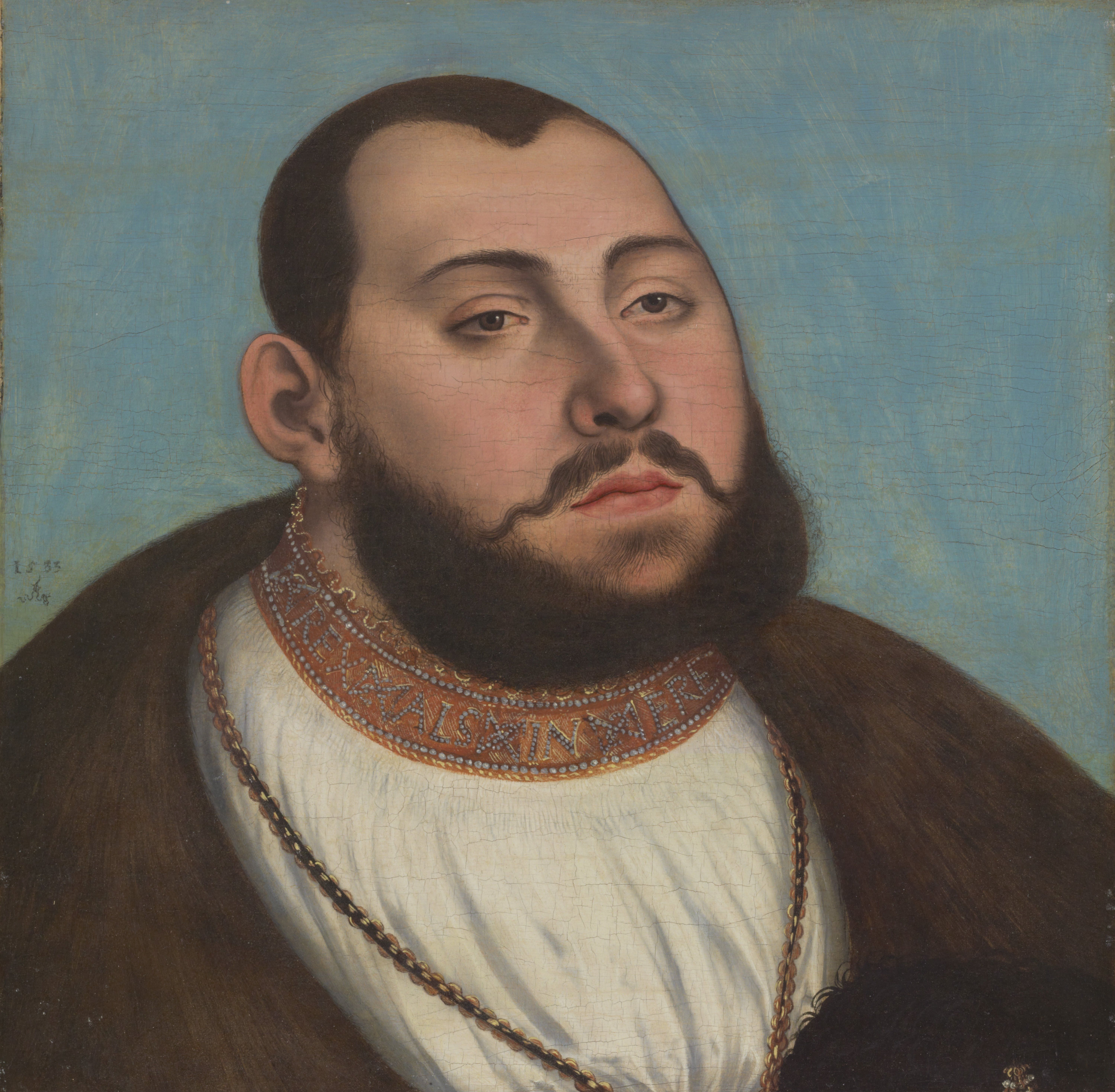
Lucas Cranach d. Ä., Johann Friedrich I von Sachsen

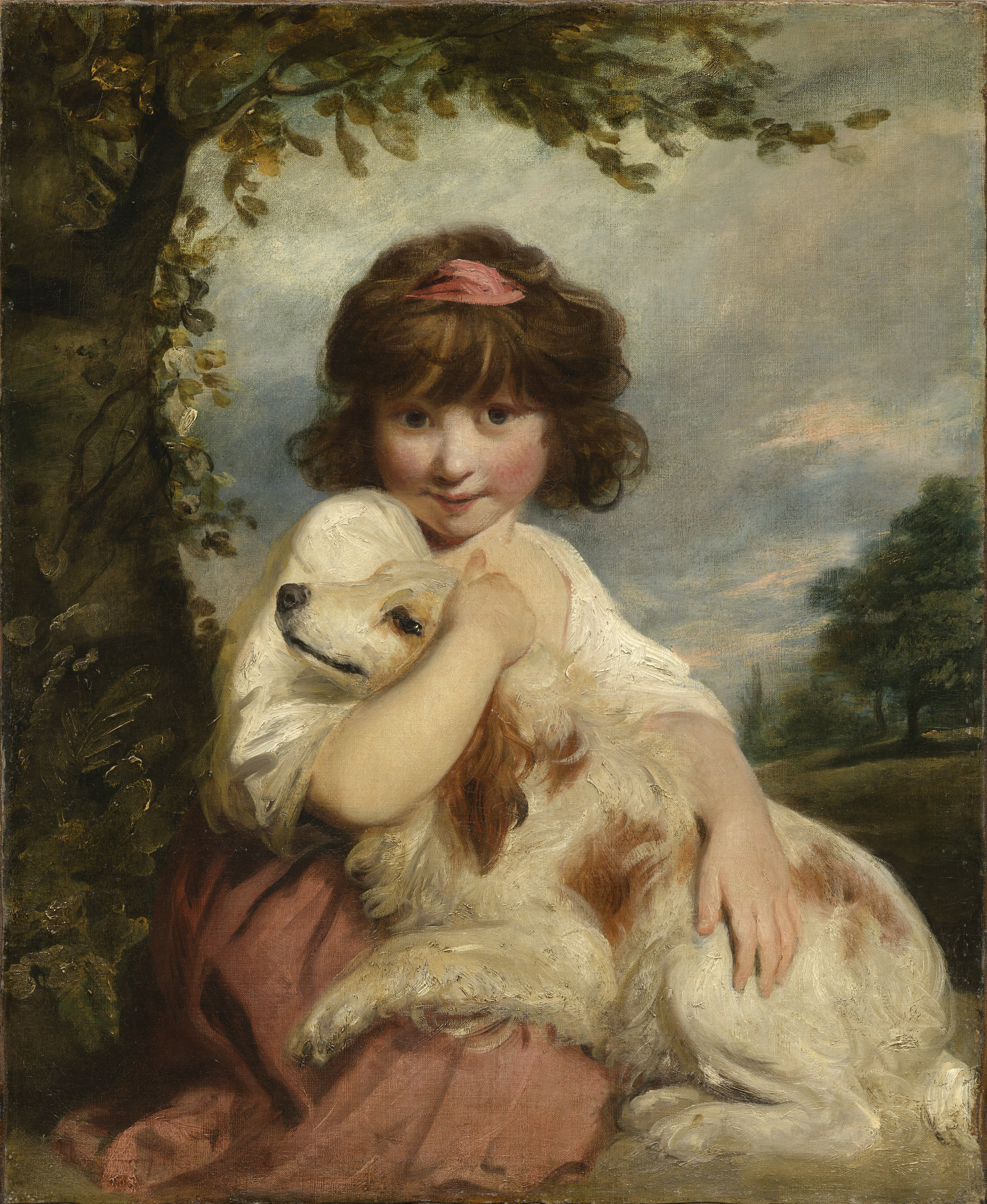
Joshua Reynolds, A Young Girl and Her Dog

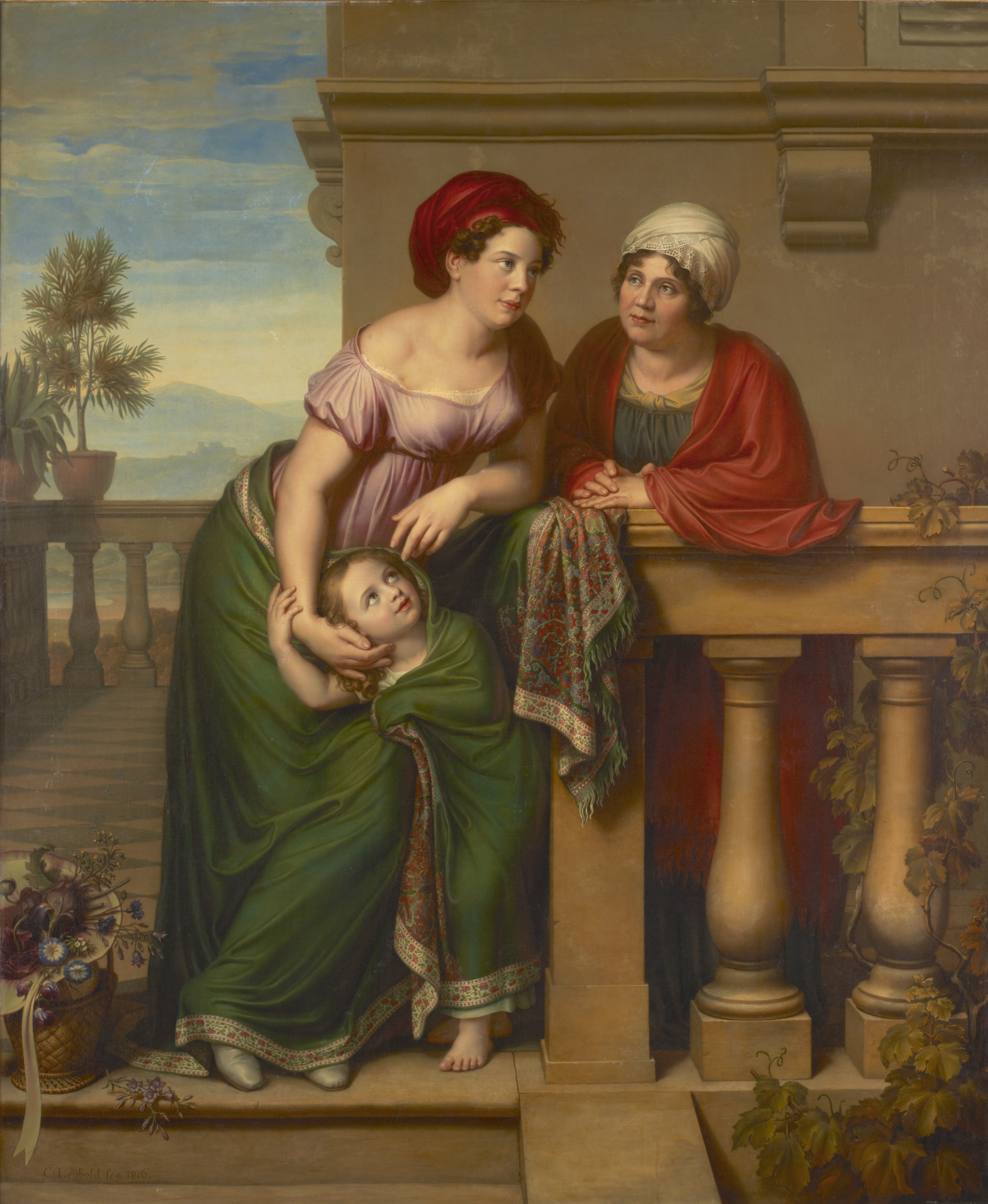
Karl Jakob Theodor Leybold, Eine Schauspielerfamilie

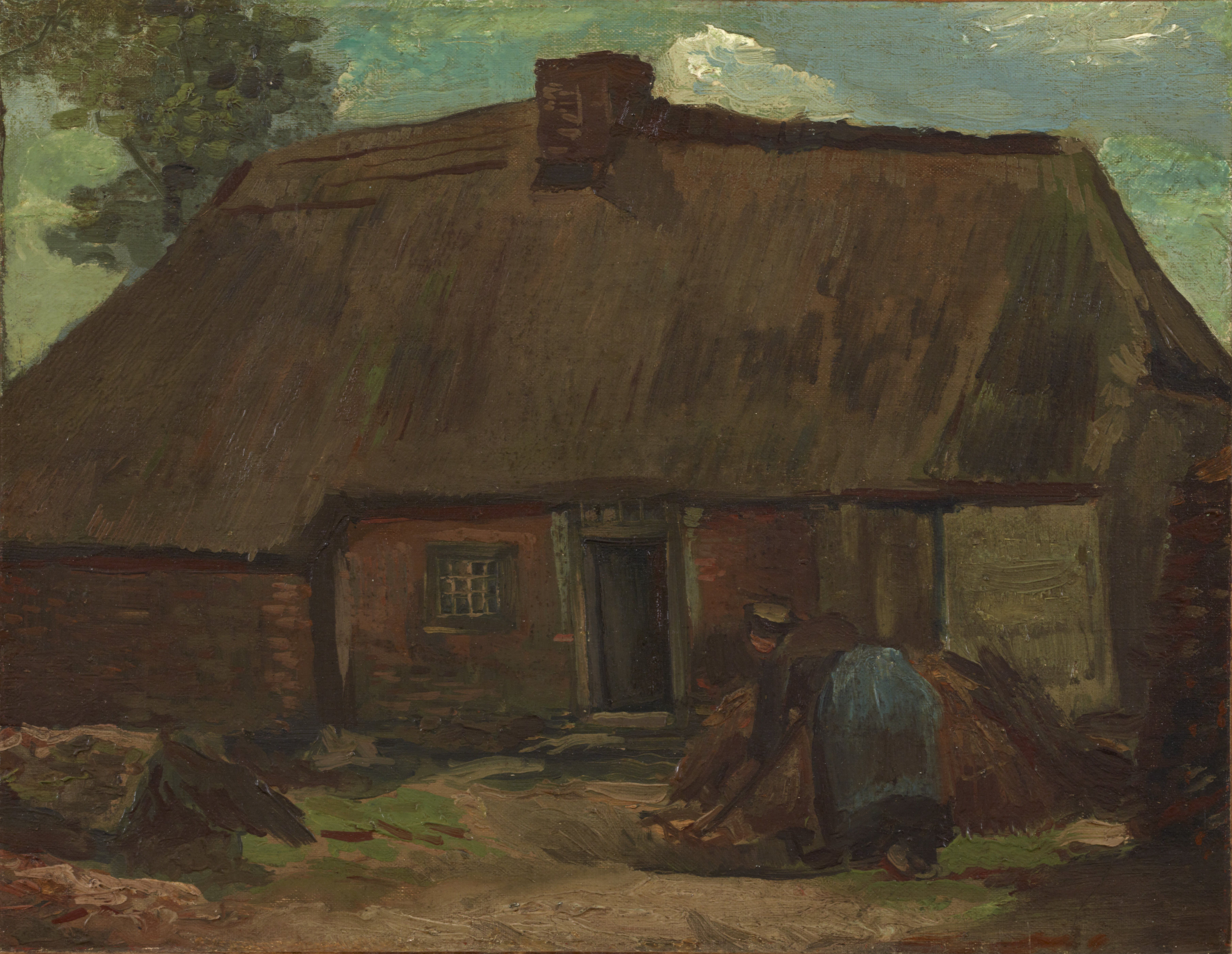
Vincent van Gogh, Cottage with Peasant Woman Digging

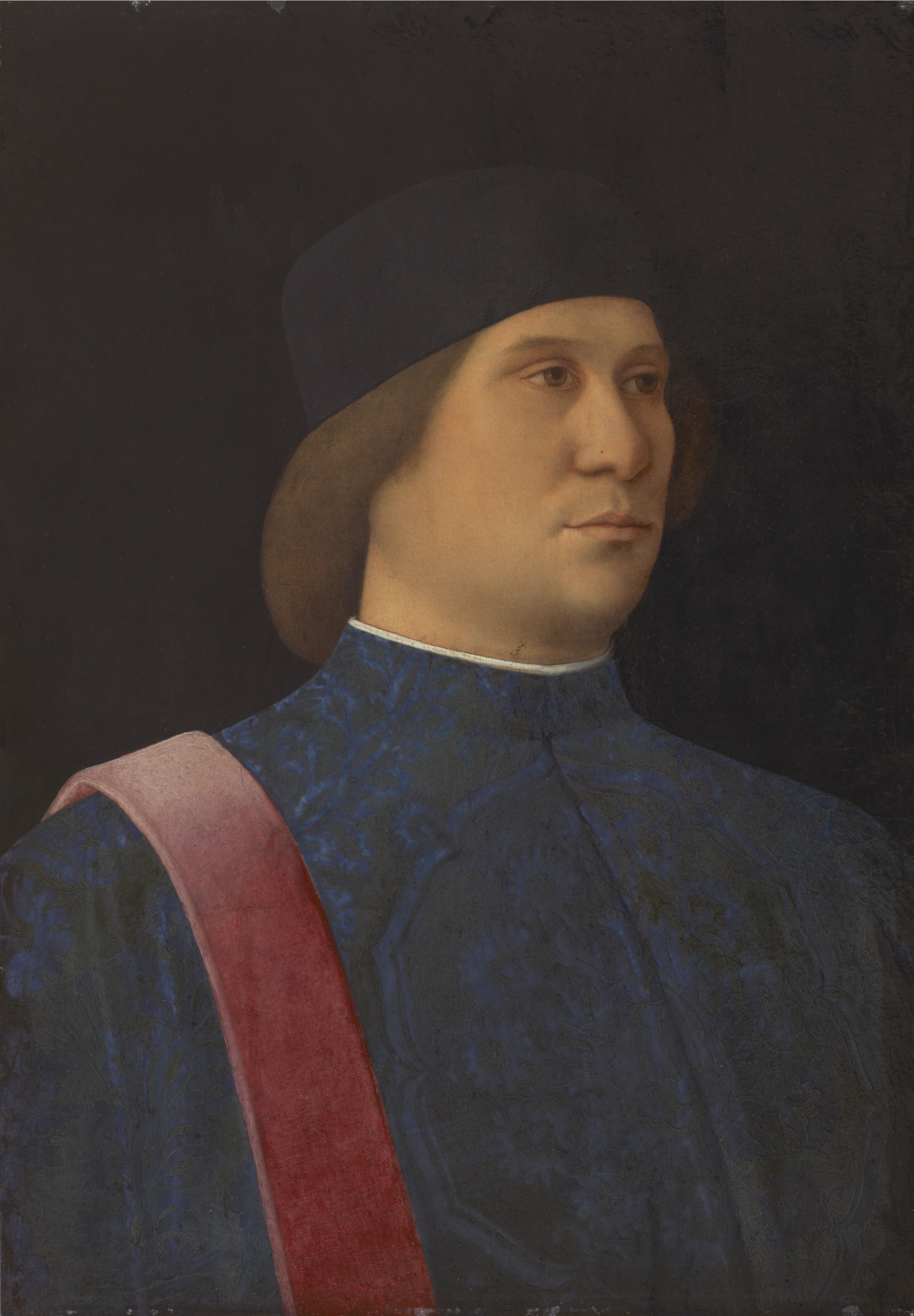
Portrait of a Procurator by Giovanni Bellini

== See also ==
- List of museums in Tokyo
