= Luca Grimaldi De Castro =

Doge of the Republic of Genoa and king of Corsica

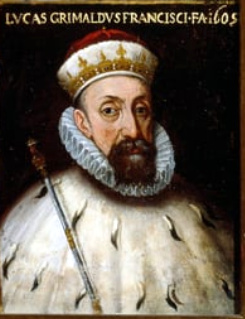

85th Doge of the Republic of Genoa
- In office March 1, 1605 – March 2, 1607
- Preceded by: Pietro De Franchi Sacco
- Succeeded by: Silvestro Invrea

Personal details
- Born: 1530 Genoa, Republic of Genoa
- Died: 1611 (aged 80–81) Genoa, Republic of Genoa

Luca Grimaldi De Castro (Genoa, 1530 - Genoa, 1611) was the 85th Doge of the Republic of Genoa.

== Biography ==
Grimaldi De Castro rose to the dogato with the elections of 1 March 1605, the fortieth in biennial succession and the eighty-fifth in republican history. During his regency he tried to find a solution to the conflicts that had directly with the Holy See for the planned demolition of a monastery, a necessary work for the creation of the new road axis between the Basilica della Santissima Annunziata del Vastato and the door of San Tomaso.

The annals also mention subsequent disagreements between the doge and the Governor of Milan Pedro Enríquez de Acevedo for the territories of Sarzana and Lunigiana. After his mandate ended, on March 2, 1607, he was appointed perpetual prosecutor and continued to serve the republic in various positions until the age of 81. Grimaldi died in Genoa during 1611.

== See also ==
- Republic of Genoa
- Doge of Genoa
- House of Grimaldi
