= Bernardo Clavarezza =

Doge of the Republic of Genoa

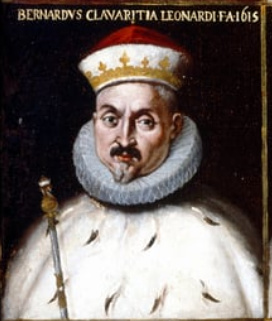

91st Doge of the Republic of Genoa
- In office April 25, 1615 – April 25, 1617
- Preceded by: Tomaso Spinola
- Succeeded by: Giovanni Giacomo Imperiale Tartaro

Personal details
- Born: 1560 Genoa, Republic of Genoa
- Died: April 27, 1627 (aged 66–67) Genoa, Republic of Genoa

Bernardo Clavarezza (Genoa, 1560 – Genoa, 27 April 1627) was the 91st Doge of the Republic of Genoa.

== Biography ==
His election as doge, the forty-sixth in biennial succession and the ninety-first in republican history, took place on 25 April 1615. The coronation in the cathedral was celebrated on 8 June by the bishop of Ventimiglia, Gerolamo Curlo. Bernardo Clavarezza's dogate is mentioned in the annals of the Republic for the firmness undertaken by the doge himself in the choices and decisions of the state. Among his customs documents, a decree of 2 September 1616 is mentioned where he nipped a nascent Genoese "journalism", considered, from several fronts, merely linked to a possible espionage. After his term of office ended on 25 April 1617, he entered the perpetual procurators and was chosen as head of the Corsican magistrate, a position he held until 1620.

== See also ==
- Republic of Genoa
- Doge of Genoa
