= Alessandro Giustiniani Longo =

Doge of the Republic of Genoa

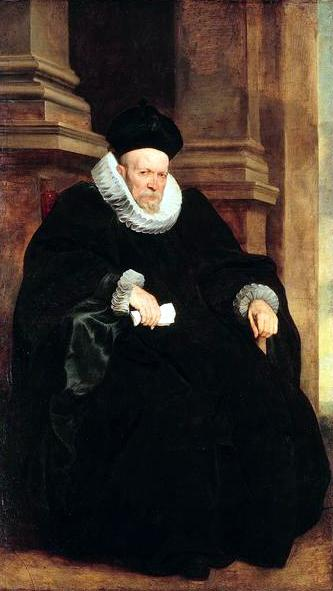
- Portrait by Anthony van Dyck

120th Doge of the Republic of Genoa
- In office April 6, 1611 – April 6, 1613
- Preceded by: Agostino Pinelli Luciani
- Succeeded by: Tomaso Spinola

Personal details
- Born: 1554 Genoa, Republic of Genoa
- Died: 1631 (aged 76–77) Genoa, Republic of Genoa

Alessandro Giustiniani Longo (Genoa, 1554 – Genoa, 1631) was the 89th Doge of the Republic of Genoa.

== Biography ==
Exponent of the so-called "new" nobility, he was elected to the highest dogal position with the elections of April 6, 1611, the forty-fourth in biennial succession and the eighty-ninth in republican history. Of his Dogate are remembered the final negotiations for the acquisition of the city of Sassello. After his Doge's mandate ended on April 6, 1613, he was elected to the office of perpetual prosecutor. He died in the Genoese capital in 1631.

== See also ==
- Republic of Genoa
- Doge of Genoa
