= Giovanni Giacomo Imperiale Tartaro =

Doge of the Republic of Genoa

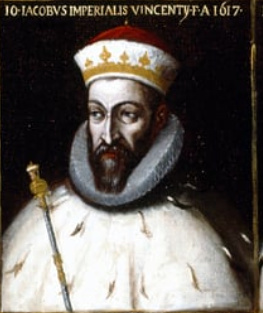

92nd Doge of the Republic of Genoa
- In office 25 April 1617 – 29 April 1619
- Preceded by: Bernardo Clavarezza
- Succeeded by: Pietro Durazzo

Personal details
- Born: 1554 Genoa, Republic of Genoa
- Died: 1622 (aged 67–68) Genoa, Republic of Genoa

Giovanni Giacomo Imperiale Tartaro (Genoa, 1554 - Genoa, 1622) was the 92nd Doge of the Republic of Genoa.

== Biography ==
On 25 April 1617 Imperiale Tartaro was elected doge of Genoa, the forty-seventh in the biennial succession and the ninety-second in republican history. During his Dogate he pacified relations with the Genoese archiepiscopal curia, in particular with Monsignor Domenico de 'Marini, and prepared new defensive works in the territory of Genoa and the republic. After his mandate ended on 29 April 1619 Imperiale Tartaro returned to his home in Piazza del Campetto, where he died in 1622.

== See also ==
- Republic of Genoa
- Doge of Genoa
- Imperiali family
