= Gerolamo Assereto =

Politician of the Republic of Genoa (1543–1627)

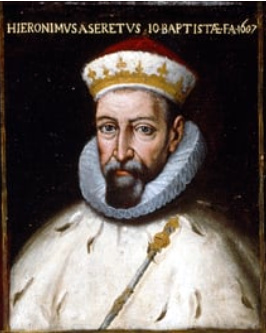

87th Doge of the Republic of Genoa
- In office March 22, 1607 – March 23, 1609
- Preceded by: Silvestro Invrea
- Succeeded by: Agostino Pinelli Luciani

Personal details
- Born: 1543 Recco, Republic of Genoa
- Died: March 15, 1627 (aged 83–84) Genoa, Republic of Genoa

Gerolamo Assereto (1543 – 15 March 1627) was the 87th Doge of the Republic of Genoa.

== Biography ==
According to historical sources, his two-year mandate was all in all "normal" and peaceful, also in the guise of doge he worked for the strengthening of the defensive positions, especially in the gulf of La Spezia, and in the management of the renewal of the Genoese navy. During the two-year period, however, some contrasts were reported with the Duchy of Savoy for some border possessions, with the Grand Duchy of Tuscany and with the Governor of Milan. After the mandate ended on March 23, 1609, he was still chosen and called to hold some important public positions such as leading the magistrate of the war. Assereto died in Genoa on March 15, 1627.

== See also ==
- Republic of Genoa
- Doge of Genoa
