= Agostino Pinelli Luciani =

Doge of the Republic of Genoa

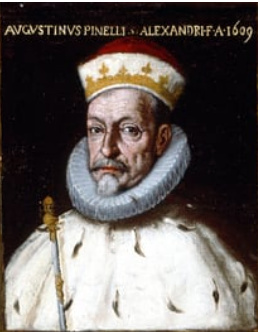

88th Doge of the Republic of Genoa
- In office 1 April 1609 – 2 April 1611
- Preceded by: Gerolamo Assereto
- Succeeded by: Alessandro Giustiniani Longo

Personal details
- Born: 1537 Genoa, Republic of Genoa
- Died: 1620 (aged 82–83) Genoa, Republic of Genoa

Agostino Pinelli Luciani (Genoa, 1537 – Genoa, 1620) was the 88th doge of the Republic of Genoa.

== Biography ==
Belonging to the so-called "old" nobility, and at the age of 72 he was elected to the dogal position with the elections of 1 April 1609, the forty-third in biennial succession and the eighty-eighth in republican history. His dogate, initially uncertain, was of ordinary administration and tranquility. He ended his term on 2 April 1611.

== See also ==
- Republic of Genoa
- Doge of Genoa
