= Giorgio Centurione =

Doge of the Republic of Genoa

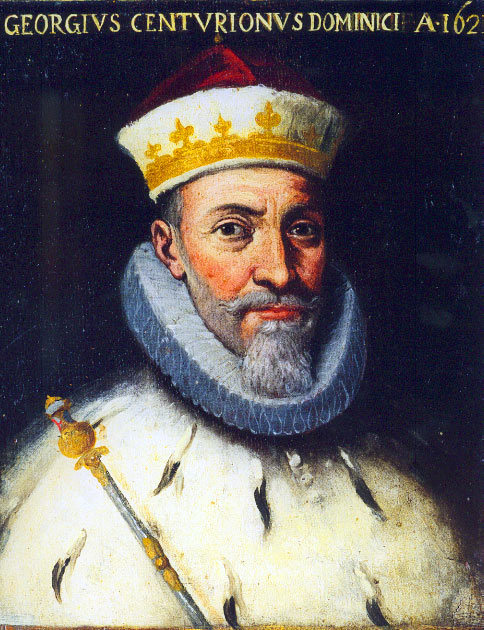

95th Doge of the Republic of Genoa
- In office 22 June 1621 – 22 June 1623
- Preceded by: Ambrogio Doria
- Succeeded by: Federico De Franchi Toso

Personal details
- Born: 23 April 1553 Genoa, Republic of Genoa
- Died: 11 January 1629 (aged 75) Genoa, Republic of Genoa

Giorgio Centurione (23 April 1553 – 11 January 1629) was a Genoese patrician and the 95th Doge of the Republic of Genoa.

== Biography ==
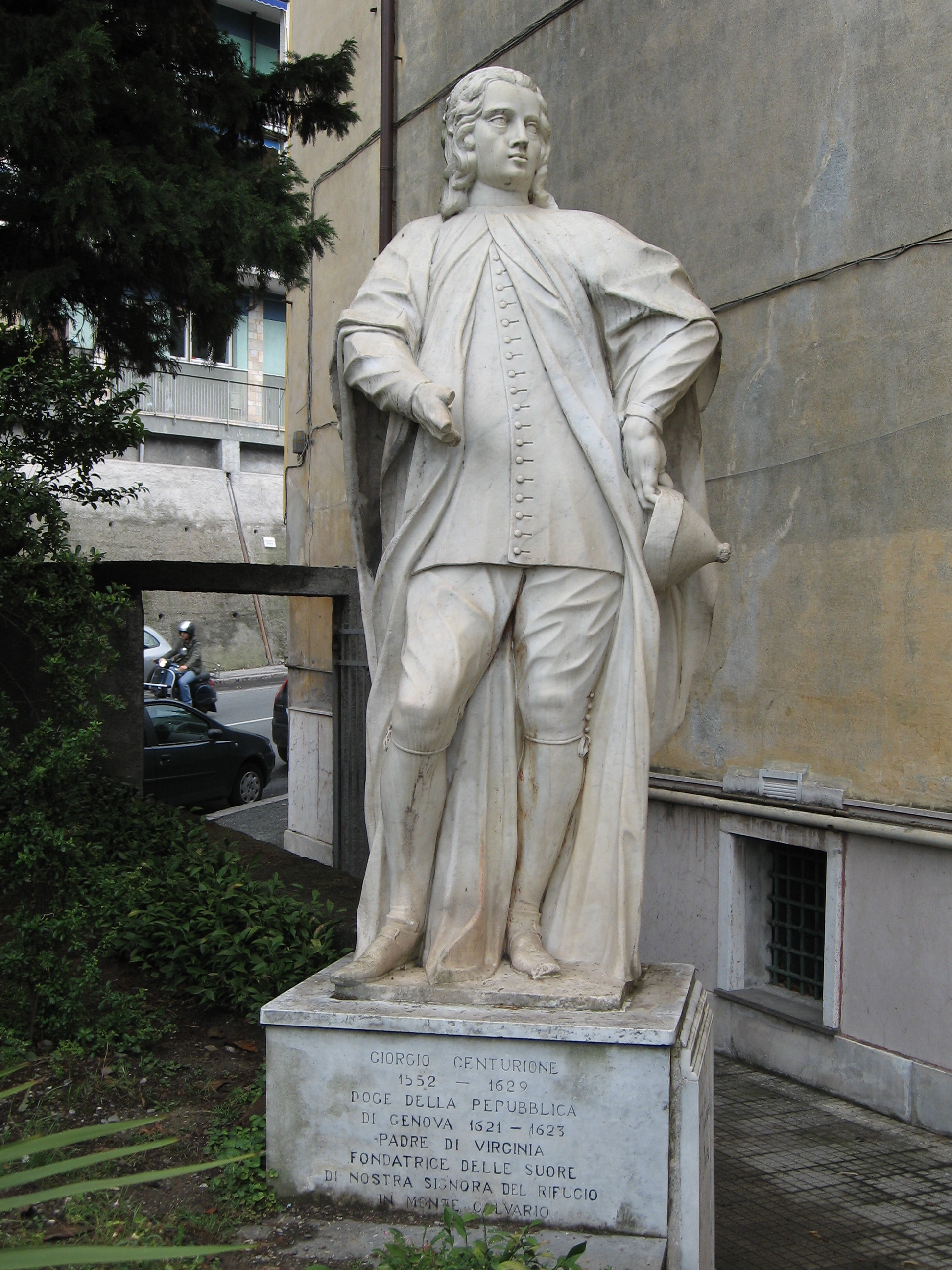
A sculpture of Giorgio Centurione in Genoa

The sudden death of the new doge Ambrogio Doria from a stroke of the brain on 12 June 1621, meant that the council was called to elect his successor, and on 22 June the figure of Giorgio Centurione was chosen as worthy of leading the State, the fiftieth in biennial succession and the 95th in republican history.

His Dogate was marked by a severe famine crisis. The Magistrate of the Communities was established to take care of the Genoese income, the Armenian Merchants Company was introduced in Genoa and the Republic of Genoa was able to acquire the Savonese territory of the Marquisate of Zuccarello . At the end of his mandate, on 22 June 1623, he was appointed perpetual procurator.

Centurione died in Genoa on 11 January 1629, leaving a substantial patrimony.

== See also ==
- Republic of Genoa
- Doge of Genoa

== Sources ==
- Sergio Buonadonna; Mario Marcenaro (2019). Rosso doge. I dogi della Repubblica di Genova dal 1339 al 1797. De Ferrari Editore.
