= Tavola Doria =

Anonymous early 16th-century Tuscan painting

La Tavola Doria is a painting depicting the central part of the famous mural painting of the Battle of Anghiari by Leonardo Da Vinci, created between 1503 and 1505.

The artist is unknown and is widely believed to be a copy of a 16th-century Tuscan artist, perhaps Poppi. A 2013 article suggests the name Giovanni Francesco Rustici.

In Leonardo's sketches for the Battle of Anghiari, the weapons used do not include daggers, knives, or small, common bladed weapons, but only extremely long spears, which are essential in establishing the composition and background of the work. These spears are masterfully used in the graphic division of the drawings, which can be viewed at the Galleria dell'Accademia in Venice. A thorough understanding of the sign present in a work is crucial for its attribution.

== The painting in the 20th century ==
In 1939, it was put up for auction by the Doria family, who had owned it since 1621. The work was protected by a decree of the Royal Superintendency of the Galleries of Naples, but in 1940, it left Naples and from then on all traces of it were lost.

It reappeared in Munich in the 1960s, a town known for having served as a hiding place for works looted by the Nazis from Jewish families.

There, scholar Carlo Pedretti took on the task of studying the painting in depth. He was the first to publish colour images of the painting, in 1968. Pedretti also began to exchange letters with the owner of the panel, Georg Hoffmann. Hoffmann, an art dealer, had collaborated with the Nazis in the 40s, and helped them to seize the Andriesses' collection.

In 1970, the work was mortgaged after Hoffmann's death, and seventeen years later it was sold to a German consultancy firm, which in 1992 sold it to a private Japanese museum, the Tokyo Fuji Art Museum, through Japanese art dealer Toshiro Akiyama. The estimated price is between 20 and 30 million euros. In 1995, an Italian expert on Leonardo, Alessandro Vezzosi, reported in an article that the Tavola Doria was in Japan. After learning it belonged to the Italian national heritage, and was therefore inalienable, the museum hid the canvas in the free port of Geneva and tried to sell it. In 2009, an agreement was almost reached with a Panamanian company for the sale of the painting to the Emir of the Sultanate of Brunei. But the Italian authorities managed to have the work placed under guardianship, making its sale impossible.

Using all the legal tools at their disposal, the Carabinieri of the CCTPC (Italian Central Committee for the Protection of the Sacred Heart) led investigations, and negotiations began between the Italian state and the Tokyo Fuji Art Museum started, which were signed on June 12, 2012. The Tavola Doria returned to Italy. Since June 13, 2012, it has been stored in the CCTPC's vault in Trastevere.
