= Giannandrea Giustiniani Longo =

Doge of the Republic of Genoa

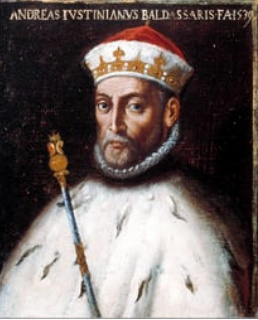

51st Doge of the Republic of Genoa
- In office 4 January 1539 – 4 January 1541
- Preceded by: Giovanni Battista Doria
- Succeeded by: Leonardo Cattaneo della Volta

Personal details
- Born: 1494 Genoa, Republic of Genoa
- Died: 1554 (aged 59–60) Genoa, Republic of Genoa

Giannandrea Giustiniani Longo (Genoa, 1494 - Genoa, 1554) was the 51st Doge of the Republic of Genoa.

== Biography ==
Before becoming the Doge of the republic, Longo held the official positions of Magistrate of the war, senator and procurator of the Republic.

He was elected doge on 4 January 1539, succeeding Giovanni Battista Doria, the sixth in biennial succession and the 51st in republican history. During the dogate he worked in particular to alleviate the consequences of the famine that had hit the city, establishing among other things the Magistrate of Mercy and granting benefits to the pawnshop. He was responsible for the construction of the Porta d'Archi, now remembered by the street that bears the same name. The mandate ended on 4 January 1541, upon its expiry.

He married Maddalena Banca, with whom he had two daughters. He died around 1554 in Genoa and was buried in the church of Santa Maria di Castello, however, his grave was destroyed during the French bombing of the city in 1684.

== See also ==
- Doge of Genoa
- Republic of Genoa
