= Agostino Doria =

Doge of the Republic of Genoa

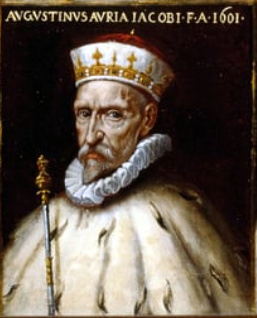

83rd Doge of the Republic of Genoa
- In office February 24, 1601 – February 25, 1603
- Preceded by: Lorenzo Sauli
- Succeeded by: Pietro De Franchi Sacco

Personal details
- Born: 1540 Genoa, Republic of Genoa
- Died: December 1, 1607 (aged 66–67) Genoa, Republic of Genoa

Agostino Doria (Genoa, 1540 - Genoa, December 1, 1607) was the 83rd Doge of the Republic of Genoa.

== Biography ==
Son of Giacomo Doria and Bettina De Franchi, he was born in Genoa around 1540. The family, extremely wealthy, descendant of the Admiral Lamba Doria, was made up of three male children, among them Nicolò Doria who was doge of Genoa in the biennium 1579-1581, and five sisters. He was the third member of the family to hold the highest dogal position after his older brother and uncle Giovanni Battista Doria in the two years 1537-1539. Doria was elected Doge of Genoa on February 24, 1601, the thirty-eighth in biennial succession and the eighty-third in republican history. After the end of his Dogate, on February 25, 1603, he was appointed perpetual prosecutor. Doria died in the Genoese capital on December 1, 1607.

== See also ==
- Republic of Genoa
- Doge of Genoa
- Doria (family)
