= Pietro Durazzo (1560–1631) =

Doge of the Republic of Genoa

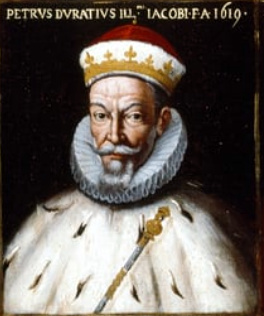

93rd Doge of the Republic of Genoa
- In office 2 May 1619 – 2 May 1621
- Preceded by: Giovanni Giacomo Imperiale Tartaro
- Succeeded by: Ambrogio Doria

Personal details
- Born: 8 August 1560 Genoa, Republic of Genoa
- Died: 18 December 1631 (aged 71) Genoa, Republic of Genoa

Pietro Durazzo (Genoa, 8 August 1560 - Genoa, 18 December 1631) was the 93rd Doge of the Republic of Genoa.

== Biography ==
Son of the former doge Giacomo Grimaldi Durazzo and Maria Maggiolo, he was born in Genoa in a period around 1560. Also thanks to the "hard" authoritarian and management policy started in Genoa and in the territories subject to it, in the Dogates of the beginning of the century by its predecessors, especially in the power struggles between rival families, the two-year period of the doge Pietro Durazzo is attested in the annals as overall quiet and of normal administration. Even in the international scenario, the political and economic relations of the Republic of Genoa with the great Italian and European powers, despite the increase in events and riots that would have led to the outbreak of the Thirty Years' War, could be defined stable and unchanged. Having a huge popular and noble support, the doge Durazzo was able to concentrate fully on the great urban works started a few years earlier. After his term of office on doge on 2 May 1621, Pietro Durazzo was appointed perpetual procurator and continued to exercise an administration service for the Genoese state and financial for the Bank of Saint George. For health reasons he had to leave the post of protector of the Holy Office in 1631, an illness that led to his death on 18 December that year.

== See also ==
- Republic of Genoa
- Doge of Genoa
- Durazzo family

== Sources ==
- Buonadonna, Sergio. Rosso doge. I dogi della Repubblica di Genova dal 1339 al 1797.
