= Giovanni Battista Doria =

Doge of the Republic of Genoa (1537–1539)

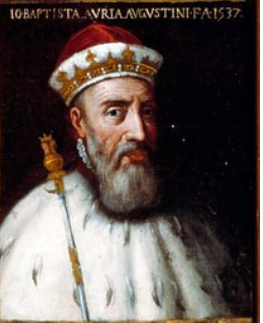

50th Doge of the Republic of Genoa
- In office 4 January 1537 – 4 January 1539
- Preceded by: Cristoforo Grimaldi Rosso
- Succeeded by: Giannandrea Giustiniani Longo

Personal details
- Born: c. 1470 Genoa, Republic of Genoa
- Died: 1554 Genoa, Republic of Genoa

Giovanni Battista Doria (1470–1554) was the 50th Doge of the Republic of Genoa.

== Biography ==
Son of Agostino Doria and Soprana Grimaldi and a member of the powerful Doria family, he was born in Genoa around 1470.

The fate of Giovanni Battista Doria was closely linked to the well-known figure of Admiral Andrea Doria. Shortly after the landing in the port of Genoa of the Andrea Doria fleet with a good number of army on board, Giovanni Battista was sent, together with other citizens, by the governor Teodoro Trivulzio for an exploratory reconnaissance of the admiral's intentions. On that occasion the two Dorias met secretly and it was Andrea himself, perhaps for the surname of the same name or simply for trust and esteem, who explained to Giovanni Battista the real reasons for his landing — "in the common struggle for freedom and estrangement from the current domination of Francis I of France.

After the various stages of the new and independent Republic, the name of Giovanni Battista Doria was found in 1536 when he began to take part in public life in the city and in government. A year later, on 4 January 1537, in the presence of Andrea Doria himself, he was elected fiftieth doge of the Republic, the fifth in biennial succession.

During his dogate the wall curtain was built near the Acquasola gate. The two-year period ended, as scheduled, on 4 January 1539. He died in Genoa around 1554 where he was buried in the demolished church of San Domenico.

=== Personal life ===
He was married to Geronima Lomellini, and had no children, unlike his brother Giacomo Doria, who saw the birth of nine children; two of these, Nicolò Doria and Agostino Doria, were also doges, in 1579–1581 and 1601–1603.

== See also ==
- Doria (family)
- Republic of Genoa
- Doge of Genoa
- Andrea Doria
