= German mediatisation =

1802–14 territorial restructuring in Germany

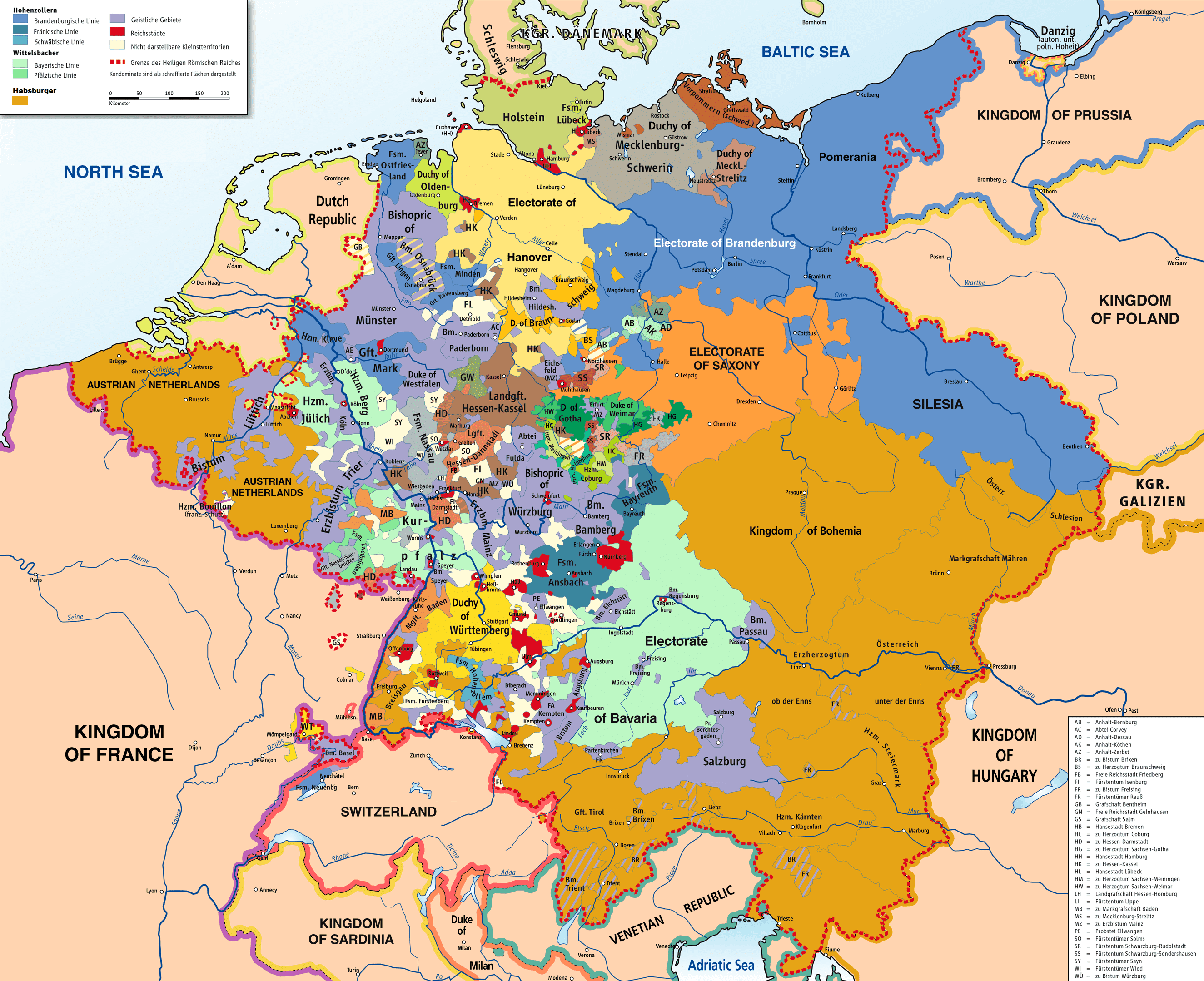
Map of the Holy Roman Empire in 1789

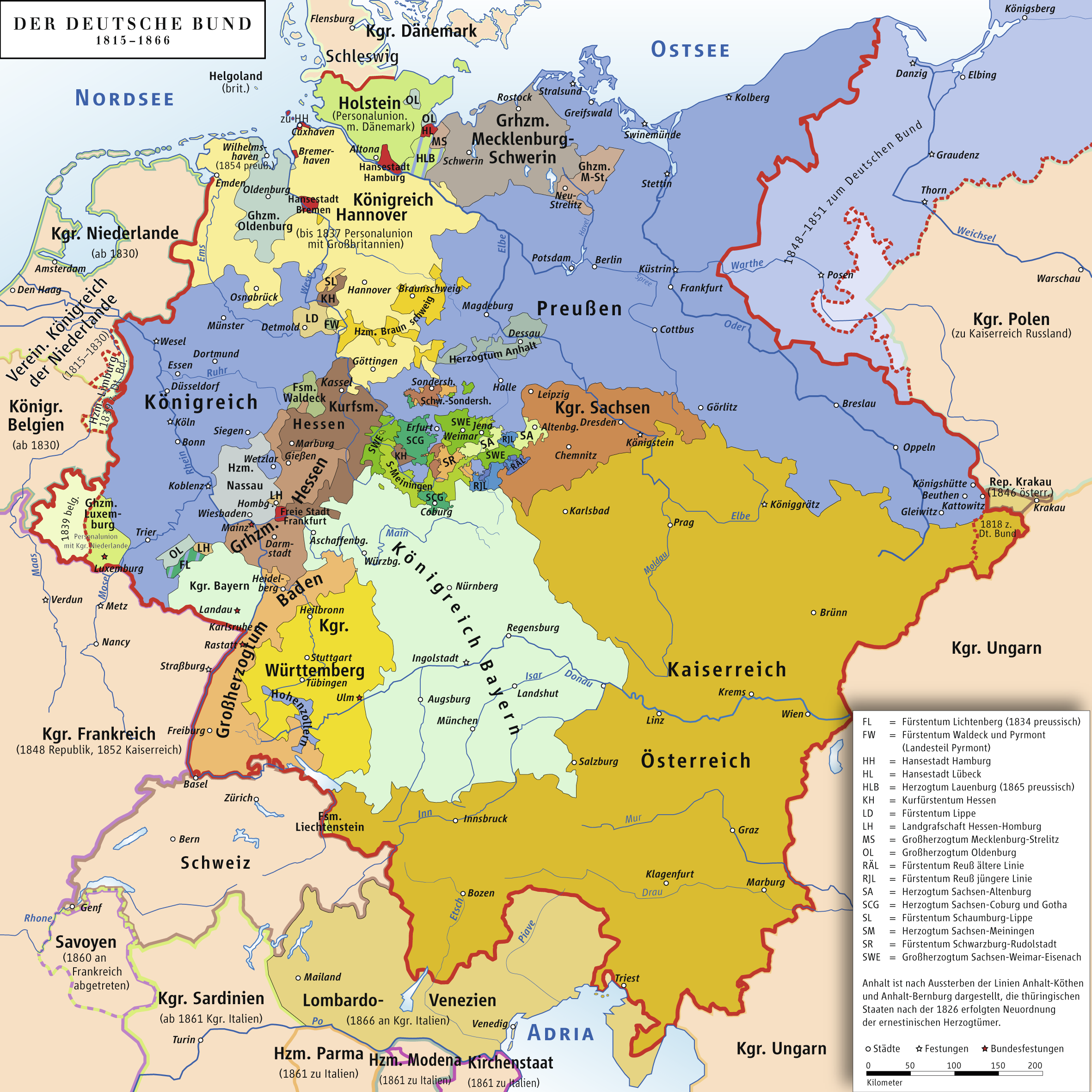
The German Confederation after 1815, the result of German mediatisation during the Napoleonic Wars

The German mediatisation (English: /miːdiətaɪˈzeɪʃən/; German: deutsche Mediatisierung) was the major redistribution and reshaping of territorial holdings that took place between 1802 and 1814 in Germany by means of the subsumption and secularisation (Note: In the present context, secularisation means "the transfer (of property) from ecclesiastical to civil possession or use".) of a large number of Imperial Estates. Nearly all the ecclesiastical principalities and free imperial cities, as well as most minor secular principalities and other self-ruling entities of the Holy Roman Empire lost their independent status and were absorbed by the remaining states. By the end of the mediatisation process with the Congress of Vienna, the number of German states had been reduced from almost 300 to 39.

In the strict sense of the word, mediatisation consists in the subsumption of an immediate (unmittelbar) state into another state, thus becoming mediate (mittelbar), while generally leaving the dispossessed ruler with his private estates and a number of privileges and feudal rights, such as low justice. For convenience, historians use the term mediatisation for the entire restructuring process that took place at the time, whether the mediatised states persisted in some form or lost all individuality. The secularisation of ecclesiastical states took place concurrently with the mediatisation of free imperial cities and other secular states.

It constituted the most extensive redistribution of property and territories in German history prior to 1945.

== Background ==
Although most of its neighbors coalesced into relatively centralized states before the 19th century, Germany did not follow that path. Instead, the Holy Roman Empire remained a feudal patchwork comprising "polyglot congeries of literally hundreds of nearly sovereign states and territories ranging in size from considerable to minuscule". From a high of nearly four hundred – 136 ecclesiastical and 173 secular lords plus 85 free imperial cities – on the eve of the Reformation, this number had only reduced to a little less than 300 by the late-18th century. (Note: These figures do not include the hundreds of tiny territories of the Imperial Knights, who were immediate vassals of the Emperor – and therefore self-ruling.) The traditional explanation for this fragmentation (Kleinstaaterei) has focused on the gradual usurpation by the princes of the powers of the Holy Roman Emperor during the Staufen period (1138–1254), to the extent that by the Peace of Westphalia (1648), the Emperor had become a mere primus inter pares. In recent decades, some historians have maintained that the fragmentation of Germany was not to be found in the misfortunes, weakness or mistakes of imperial dynasties, but rather in the huge geographical extent of the Empire and the vigor of aristocratic and ecclesiastical rule in its localities. Successive imperial dynasties were compelled to accept a set of circumstances that could not be reversed until the 19th century: that the autonomous rule of the bishops, abbots, and secular princes, interspersed with independent city-states and lands of the imperial knights, constituted the German political structure, in other words, local sovereignty under the Emperor's suzerainty. Already in the 12th century, the secular and spiritual princes did not regard themselves as the Emperor's subordinates, still less his subjects, but as rulers in their own right – and they jealously defended their established sphere of predominance. At the time of Emperor Frederick II's death in 1250, it had already been decided that the regnum Teutonicum was "an aristocracy with a monarchical head".

Among those states and territories, the ecclesiastical principalities were unique to Germany. Historically, the Ottonian and early Salian Emperors, who appointed the bishops and abbots, used them as agents of the imperial crown – as they considered them more dependable than the dukes they appointed and who often attempted to establish independent hereditary principalities. The emperors expanded the power of the Church, and especially of the bishops, with land grants and numerous privileges of immunity and protection as well as extensive judicial rights, which eventually coalesced into a distinctive temporal principality: the Hochstift. The German bishop became a "prince of the Empire" and direct vassal of the Emperor for his Hochstift, while continuing to exercise only pastoral authority over his larger diocese. The personal appointment of bishops by the Emperors had sparked the investiture controversy in the 11th century, and in its aftermath the emperor's control over the bishops' selection and rule diminished considerably. The bishops, now elected by independent-minded cathedral chapters rather than chosen by the emperor or the pope, were confirmed as territorial lords equal to the secular princes.

== Secularisation ==
=== Early secularisations ===
The register prepared for the 1521 Imperial Diet of Worms listed as ecclesiastical Estates three ecclesiastical electors, four archbishops, 46 bishops and 83 lesser prelates (imperial abbots and abbesses) compared to 180 secular lords. By 1792 only three electors, one archbishop, 29 bishops and prince-abbots, and 40 prelates remained, alongside 165 secular Estates. The decline had started well before the Reformation, which only accelerated the trend for secular rulers to incorporate into their territories the material assets of Church fiefs. Many of the ecclesiastical Estates recorded in the 1521 register were already disappearing this way, including 15 prince-bishoprics. In the course of the Reformation, several of the bishoprics in the north and northeast were secularized and transformed into secular duchies, mostly to the benefit of Protestant princes. In the later sixteenth century the Counter-Reformation attempted to reverse some of these secularisations, and the question of the fates of secularized territories became an important one in the Thirty Years' War (1618–1648). In the end, the Peace of Westphalia confirmed the secularisation of a score of prince-bishoprics, including the archbishoprics of Bremen and Magdeburg and six bishoprics with full political powers, (Note: Unlike those, some secularized prince-bishoprics in the north and northeast, such as Brandenburg, Havelberg, Lebus, Meissen, Merseburg, Naumburg-Zeitz, Schwerin and Camin had ceased to exercise independent rights and had effectively become subordinate to powerful neighboring rulers well before the Reformation. Therefore, they had become prince-bishoprics in name only.) which were assigned to Sweden, Brandenburg and Mecklenburg. On the other hand, Hildesheim and Paderborn – under Protestant administration for decades and given up for lost – were restored as prince-bishoprics. In addition, the Peace conclusively reaffirmed the imperial immediacy, and therefore the de facto independence, of the prince-bishops and imperial abbots, free imperial cities, imperial counts, as well as the imperial knights. According to one authority, the sixty-five ecclesiastical rulers then controlled one-seventh of the total land area and approximately 12% of the Empire's population, perhaps three and a half million subjects.

Owing to the traumatic experience of the Thirty Years' War and in order to avoid a repetition of this catastrophe, the German rulers great or small were now inclined to value law and legal structures more highly than ever before in the history of the Empire. This explains in good part why medium and small states, both ecclesiastical and secular, were able to survive and even prosper in the vicinity of powerful states with standing armies such as Brandenburg/Prussia, Bavaria and Austria.

=== 18th-century secularisation plans ===
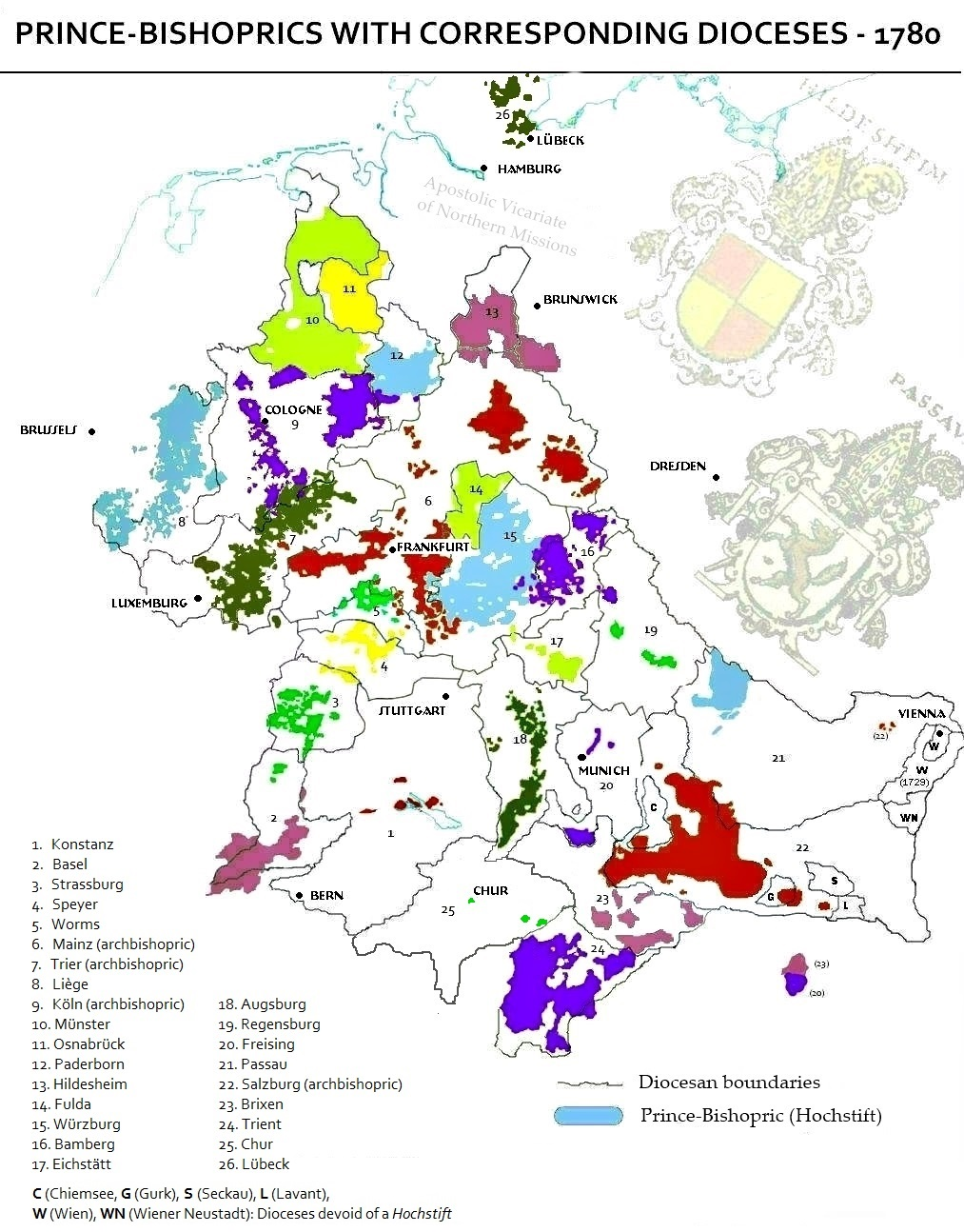
The prince-bishoprics on the eve of secularisation

While no actual secularisation took place during the century and a half that followed the Peace of Westphalia, there was a long history of rumors and half-baked plans on possible secularisations. The continued existence of independent prince-bishoprics, an anomalous phenomenon unique to the Holy Roman Empire, was increasingly considered an anachronism especially, but not exclusively, by the Protestant princes, who also coveted these defenceless territories. Thus, secret proposals by Prussia to end the War of the Austrian Succession called for increasing the insufficient territorial base of the Wittelsbach Emperor Charles VII through his annexation of some prince-bishoprics. In 1743, Frederick II's minister Heinrich von Podewils wrote a memorandum that suggested giving to the Wittelsbach Emperor the bishoprics of Passau, Augsburg and Regensburg, as well as the imperial cities of Augsburg, Regensburg and Ulm. Frederick II added the Archbishopric of Salzburg to the list and Charles VII went as far as adding the bishoprics of Eichstätt and Freising. The plan caused a sensation, and outrage among the prince-bishops, the free imperial cities and the other minor imperial estates, and the bishops discussed raising an army of 40,000 to defend themselves against the Emperor who contemplated grabbing ecclesiastical land that his coronation oath committed him to protect. Although the sudden death of Charles VII put an end to this scheming, the idea of secularisation did not fade away. It was actively discussed during the Seven Years' War, and again during Joseph II's maneuverings over the Bavarian inheritance and during his later exchange plan to swap Bavaria for the Austrian Netherlands, which included a secret provision for the secularisation of the Archbishopric of Salzburg and the Provostry of Berchtesgaden. Yet, none of these projects ever came close to be implemented because, in the end, key actors appreciated that the secularisation of one single prince-bishopric would open a Pandora's box and have severe repercussions on the institutional stability of the Empire.

=== Impact of the French Revolution ===
By the late 18th century, the continued existence of the Holy Roman Empire, despite its archaic constitution, was not seriously threatened from within its limits. An external factor – the French Revolution and the ascent of Napoleon Bonaparte – brought about its demise.

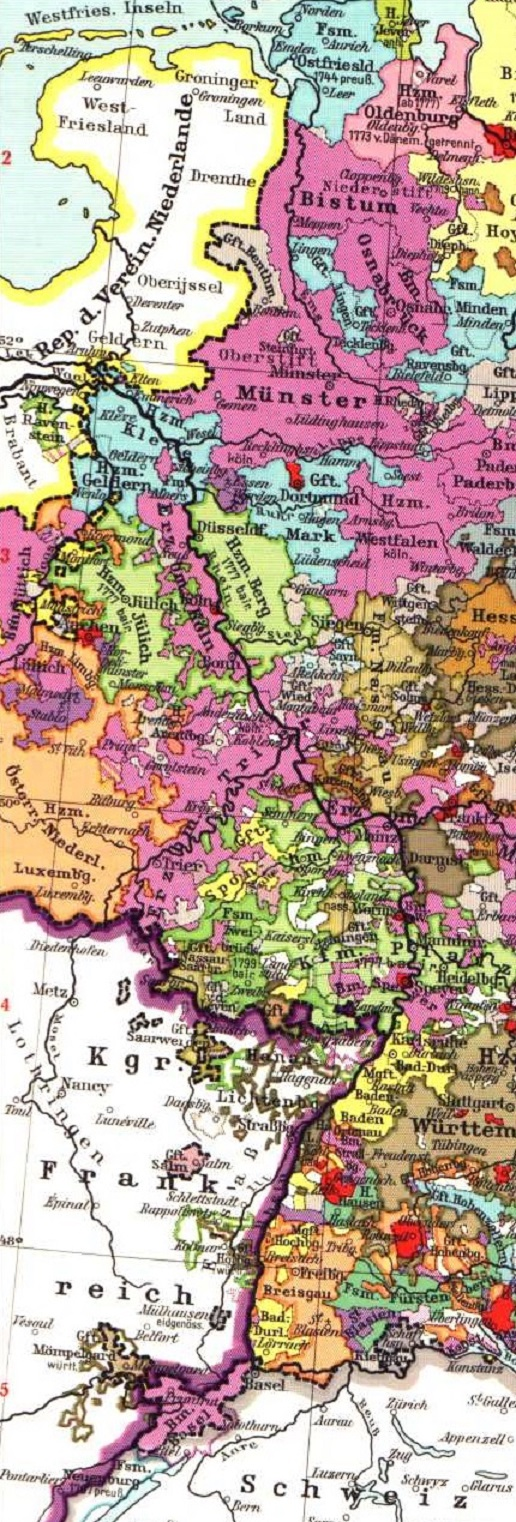
The Rhineland in 1789, with the ecclesiastical states shown in purple: The annexation of the left bank of the Rhine by the French Republic set in motion the mediatisation process

The outbreak of the French Revolution had immediate repercussions in Germany. From July 1789, a steady stream of French émigrés arrived in Germany. While most neighboring secular rulers, such as the Palatine Elector, the Margrave of Baden and the Duke of Württemberg, remained cautious, even following the confiscation of their property and jurisdictions in Alsace, the ecclesiastical rulers, who in addition to Church property had seen their diocesan rights abolished in that province, showed no such restraint. The Archbishop-Elector of Mainz offered hospitality to the Count of Artois (who was later King Charles X) and the Prince of Condé, and their presence attracted many others. The Archbishop-Elector of Trier, maternal uncle to Louis XVI and his brothers, followed suit and before long an émigré community of some 20,000, many plotting the overthrow of the French revolutionaries, was established in the ecclesiastical principalities. In addition, some ecclesiastical rulers, most stridently August von Limburg, Prince-Bishop of Speyer, demanded immediate intervention against the "godless" revolutionaries. In this context the émigrés, and the ecclesiastical princes who harbored them, became the object of vituperative propaganda by the French revolutionaries. The threat posed by the émigrés was one of the factors that contributed to the growing ascendancy of the radical Jacobins who believed that a revolutionary war was the only way the achievements of the Revolution could be secured.

After Revolutionary France declared war on Prussia and Austria in April 1792, its armies invaded, and by the end of 1794, France had consolidated its hold over the Austrian Netherlands and the rest of the left bank of the Rhine. The forcefully secular French Republic had outlawed independent, non-state-sanctioned houses of worship; thus both Catholic and Protestant Germany were hostile to the Republic. Many German rulers allowed French émigrés to carry on counterrevolutionary activities from their lands. The French leaders resolved more or less openly to annex those lands to the Republic as soon as circumstances permitted, dispossessing both secular and ecclesiastical German rulers. The French revolutionaries, and later Napoleon, felt that some of these secular rulers should be compensated, by receiving "secularized" ecclesiastical land and property located on the right bank.

Already, the Franco-Prussian Treaty of Basel of April 1795 spoke of "a compensation" in case a future general peace with the Holy Roman Empire surrendered to France the German territories west of the Rhine, including the Prussian provinces. A secret Franco-Prussian convention signed in August 1796 specified that such a compensation would be the Prince-Bishopric of Münster and Vest Recklinghausen. In addition, Article 3 of the convention provided that the Prince of Orange-Nassau, dynastically related to the king of Prussia, who actively defended his interests, would be compensated with the Prince-Bishoprics of Würzburg and Bamberg if his loss of the Dutch hereditary stadtholdership, which followed the creation of the French-backed Batavian Republic, was to become permanent. Likewise, the peace treaties France signed with Württemberg and Baden the same month contained secret articles whereby France committed to intercede to obtain the cession of specific ecclesiastical territories as their compensation in case their losses became permanent.

Signed in the wake of major French victories over the Austrian armies, the Treaty of Campo Formio of October 1797, dictated by General Bonaparte, provided that Austria would be compensated for the loss of the Austrian Netherlands and Austrian Lombardy with Venice and Dalmatia. A secret article, not implemented at the time, added the Archbishopric of Salzburg and a portion of Bavaria as additional compensation. The treaty also provided for the holding of a congress at Rastatt where delegates of the Imperial Diet would negotiate a general peace with France. It was widely and correctly anticipated that France would demand the formal cession of the entire west bank, that the dispossessed secular princes be compensated with ecclesiastical territories east of the Rhine, and that a specific compensation plan be discussed and adopted. Indeed, on 9 March 1798, the delegates at the congress at Rastatt formally accepted the sacrifice of the entire left bank and, on 4 April 1798, approved the secularisation of all the ecclesiastical states save the three Electorates of Mainz, Cologne and Trier, whose continued existence was an absolute red line for Emperor Francis II. The congress, which lingered on well into 1799, failed in its other goals due to disagreement among the delegates on the repartition of the secularized territories and insufficient French control over the process caused by the mounting power struggle in Paris.

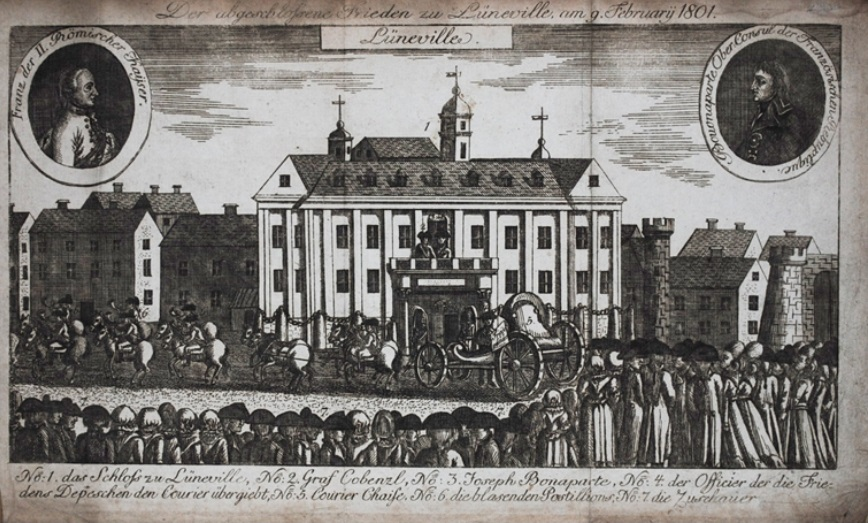
Contemporary engraving celebrating the Treaty of Lunéville

In March 1799, Austria, allied with Russia, resumed the war against France. A series of military defeats and the withdrawal of Russia from the war forced Austria to seek an armistice and, on 9 February 1801 to sign the Treaty of Lunéville which mostly reconfirmed the Treaty of Campo Formio and the guidelines set at Rastatt. Article 7 of the treaty provided that "in conformity with the principles formally established at the congress of Rastatt, the empire shall be bound to give to the hereditary Princes who shall be dispossessed on the left bank of the Rhine, an indemnity, which shall be taken from the whole of the empire, according to arrangements which on these bases shall be ultimately determined upon". This time, Francis II signed the treaty not only on Austria's behalf but also on behalf of the Empire, which officially conceded the loss of the Austrian Netherlands and the left bank of the Rhine.

=== Debate on compensation and secularisation ===
The sudden realization in the wake of Campo Formio that the Empire was on the threshold of radical changes initiated a debate on the issues of compensation and secularisation conducted in pamphlets, in the press, in the political correspondence within and amongst the territories and at the Imperial Diet. Among other arguments, the defenders of the ecclesiastical states insisted that it was fundamentally illegal and unconstitutional to dissolve any imperial estates, and that the notion of compensating rulers for lost territory was contrary to all past treaties, where "each had to bear his own fate". They contended that even if circumstances now made it necessary, the amount of compensation should be limited to the amount of territory, or income, lost, and that all the Estates of the Empire, and not just the ecclesiastical states, should bear the burden. They warned that a complete secularisation would be such a blow to the Empire that it would lead to its demise. Generally, the proponents of secularisation were less vocal and passionate, in good part because they realized that the course of events was in their favor. Even when they were in agreement with some of the anti-secularisation arguments, they contended that Notrecht (the law of necessity) made secularisation unavoidable: the victorious French unequivocally demanded it and since peace was essential to the preservation of the state, sacrificing part of the state to preserve the whole was not only permissible but necessary. For its part, Austria was to be consistently hostile to secularisation, particularly in its wholesale form, since it realized it had more to lose than to gain from it as it would result in the disappearance of the ecclesiastical princes and prelates from the Imperial Diet and the loss of their traditional support for the Emperor. Likewise, the Electors of Hanover and Saxony opposed the principles of compensation and secularization, not out of sympathy for the Catholic Church, but because they feared it would lead to the aggrandizement of Prussia, Austria and Bavaria.

== Final Recess of February 1803 ==
The Final Recess of the Imperial Deputation (German: Reichsdeputationshauptschluss) of 25 February 1803 is commonly referred to as the Imperial law that brought about the territorial restructuring of the Empire by subsuming the church states and imperial cities to larger secular imperial estates. In reality, neither the Final Recess nor the Imperial Deputation which drafted it played a significant role in the process since many decisions had already been made in Paris before the Deputation began its work. The Final Recess was nevertheless indispensable in lending a constitutional imprimatur on territorial remapping and the granting and denial of obligations and prerogatives that would otherwise have lacked legitimacy.

=== Background ===
Hard pressed by Bonaparte, now firmly at the helm in France as First Consul, the Empire was obliged soon after Lunéville to take on the task of drafting a definitive compensation plan (Entschädigungsplan). The Imperial Diet resolved to entrust that task to the Emperor, as plenipotentiary of the Empire, while it intended to reserve the final decision to itself. Not wanting to bear the full onus of the changes that were bound to occur under French diktat, Francis II declined. After months of deliberations, a compromise was reached in November 1801 to delegate the compensation task to an Imperial Deputation (Reichsdeputation), with France to act as 'mediator'. The Deputation consisted of the plenipotentiaries of the Electors of Mainz, Saxony, Brandenburg/Prussia, Bohemia and Bavaria, and of the Duke of Württemberg, the Landgrave of Hesse-Cassel and the Grand Master of the Teutonic Order.

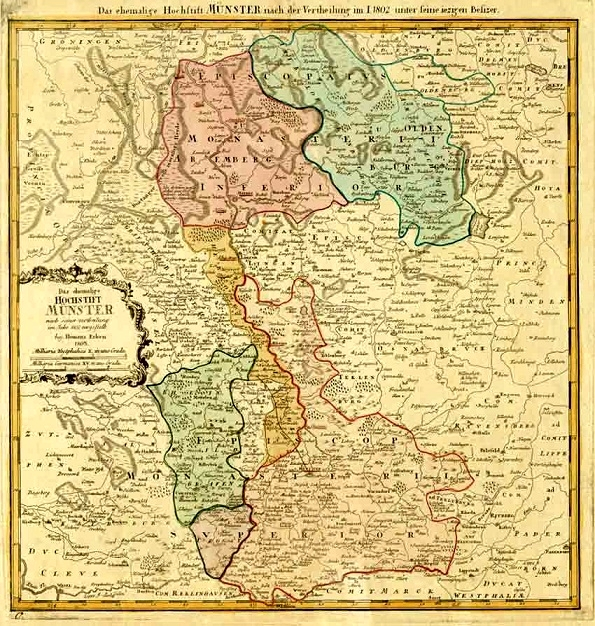
Contemporary map showing the partition of Münster

Soon after Lunéville, the key German rulers entitled to compensation moved quickly to secure their compensation directly with France, and Paris was soon flooded with envoys bearing shopping lists of coveted territories. The French government encouraged the movement. Bonaparte left the details to his foreign minister Talleyrand, who famously lined his pockets with bribes. (Note: Barras, a former prominent member of the Directorate, devoted several pages of his memoirs to the venality of his former protégé Talleyrand and his underlings who allegedly collected 15 million francs in bribes during the compensation process.) Meanwhile, Bonaparte, who had been courting the new Tsar Alexander I, replied favourably to the latter's wish to become involved in the process as co-mediator. On 19 October 1801 the two countries signed an agreement to act jointly as the "mediating Powers". Essentially, Alexander, whose wife and mother belonged to the princely houses of Baden and Württemberg, wanted to favor his various German relatives and this concurred with France's long-standing aim to strengthen the southern states of Baden, Württemberg, Hesse-Darmstadt and Bavaria, strategically located between France and Austria, the arch-foe. Hectic discussions and dealings went on, not only with the mediating Powers and between the various princes, but within the various governments as well. Inside the Prussian cabinet, one group pushed for expansion westward into Westphalia while another favored expansion southward into Franconia, with the pro-Westphalian group finally prevailing. Between July 1801 and May 1802, preliminary compensation agreements were signed with Bavaria, Württemberg, and Prussia and others were concluded less formally with Baden, Hesse-Darmstadt, Hesse-Cassel and other mid-level states.

Frantic discussions and dealings went on simultaneously in Regensburg, where the Imperial Diet and its Deputation were in session. In particular, many mid and lower ranking rulers who lacked influence in Paris – the dukes of Arenberg, Croy and Looz, the prince of Salm-Kyrburg, the counts of Sickingen and Wartenberg, among others – tried their chances with the French diplomats posted at Regensburg, who could recommend additions or amendments to the general compensation plan, generally in exchange for bribes. (Note: A letter of Talleyrand to Laforest, the head of the French delegation in Regensburg, alludes to millions being paid by, among others, the three Hanseatic Cities (Hamburg, Lübeck, Bremen) Frankfurt and Württemberg.) Nevertheless, all claims were examined and there was an effort to detect fictitious or exaggerated claims. The Imperial Deputation very seldom examined the claims and grievances, which were almost automatically transferred to the local French officials for decision or referral to Talleyrand in Paris.

=== General compensation plan ===
A "general compensation plan" combining the various formal and informal accords concluded in Paris was drafted by Talleyrand in June 1802, approved by Russia with minor changes, and submitted almost as an ultimatum to the Imperial Deputation when it finally convened at Regensburg for its first meeting on 24 August 1802. It was stated in the preamble that the mediating Powers had been forced to come up with a compensation plan due to the "irreconcilable differences between the German Princes" regarding the details of compensation, and the Imperial Deputation's delay in starting its work. It was said that the plan, "based on calculations of unquestionable impartiality" endeavored to effect compensation for recognized losses while "maintaining the pre-war balance of power between the key German rulers", two goals that were somewhat contradictory. The mediating Powers had decided right from the beginning of the process that income rather than population and size was to be the determining factor in estimating the losses.

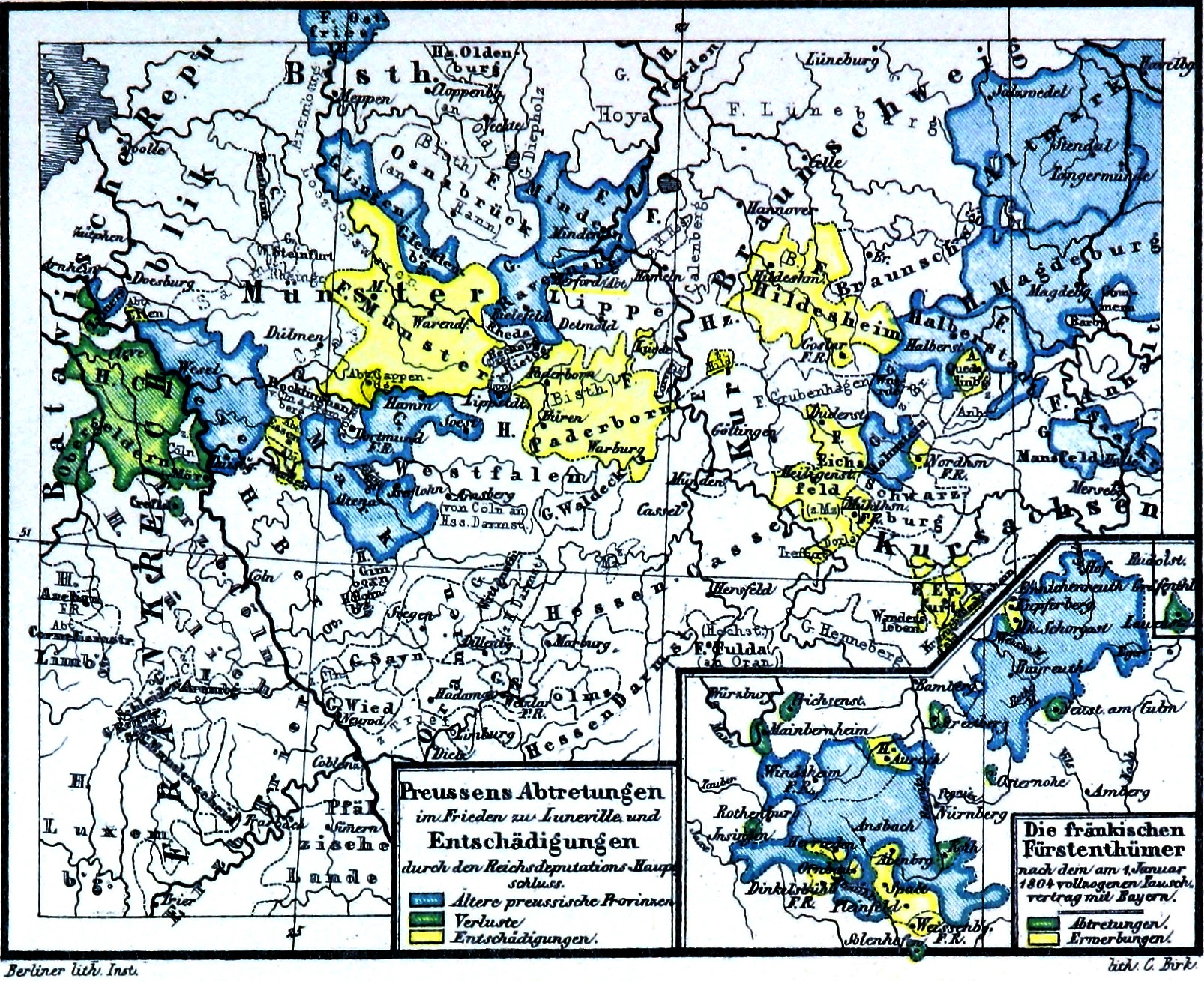
Prussia's territorial losses and gains during the period

As Austria had been excluded from the discussions, its envoy at Paris only learned of the plan when he read it in Le Moniteur. He swiftly negotiated revisions which confirmed both Francis II's Imperial prerogatives and his rights as ruler of Austria. The Habsburgs' compensation package was also augmented with additional secularized bishoprics. Francis II had been hostile to secularisation, but once it became clear that near complete secularisation was unavoidable, he fought as hard as any other ruler to obtain his share of former church states. He was particularly adamant that his younger brother Ferdinand, who had been dispossessed of his secundogeniture Grand Duchy of Tuscany by the invading French, be adequately compensated.

The Imperial Deputation, originally entrusted with the compensation process but now reduced to a subordinate role, tended to be seen by the mediating Powers and the key German States as mere constitutional window dressing. This was demonstrated with the Franco-Prussian agreement of 23 May 1802 which, ignoring the Imperial Deputation that has not yet convened, stated that both the King of Prussia and the Prince of Orange-Nassau could take possession of the territories allotted to them immediately after ratification. Two weeks later, the King issued a proclamation listing all the compensation territories awarded to Prussia but he waited until the first week of August 1802 before occupying the bishoprics of Paderborn and Hildesheim and its share of Münster, as well as the other territories that had been allotted to Prussia. The same month, Bavarian troops entered Bamberg and Würzburg a week after Elector Maximilian IV Joseph had written to their respective prince-bishops to inform them of the imminent occupation of their principalities. During the autumn, Bavaria, Baden, Hesse-Darmstadt, and Württemberg, and even Austria, proceeded to occupy the prince-bishoprics, imperial abbeys, and free Imperial cities that had been allotted to them. Formal annexation and the establishment of a civil administration usually followed within a few weeks. Such haste was due in good part to the fear that the June plan might not be definitive and therefore it was thought safer to occupy the allotted territories and place everyone before a fait accompli. That strategy was not foolproof however and Bavaria, which had been in occupation of the bishopric of Eichstätt since September, was forced to evacuate it when the Franco-Austrian convention of 26 December 1802 reallocated most of Eichstätt to the Habsburg compensation package. For their parts, the lesser princes and the counts, with little manpower and resources, generally had to wait until the Final Recess was issued before they could take possession of the territories – if any – that were awarded to them as compensation, usually a secularized abbey or one of the smaller imperial cities.

=== Approval and ratification of the Final Recess ===
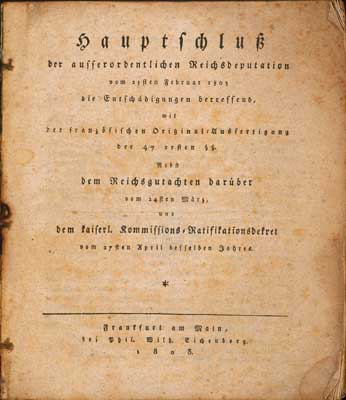
First page of the Final Recess of February 1803

On 8 October 1802, the mediating Powers transmitted to the Deputation their second general compensation plan whose many modifications reflected the considerable number of claims, memoirs, petitions and observations they had received from all quarters. A third plan was transmitted in November and a final one in mid-February 1803. It served as the basis for the Final Recess (German: Reichsdeputationshauptschluss) that the Deputation issued at its 46th meeting on 25 February 1803. The Imperial Diet approved it on 24 March and the Emperor ratified it on 27 April. The Emperor however made a formal reservation with respect to the reallocation of seats and votes within the Imperial Diet. While he accepted the new ten-member College of Electors, which would for the first time have a Protestant majority, (Note: The Habsburg dynasty's tenure of the emperorship was not seriously threatened since the Habsburg would control two electoral votes (Bohemia and Salzburg) instead of one (Bohemia), and the key Protestant Electors would effectively neutralize each other: Hanover and Saxony would never contemplate electing a Prussian emperor and vice versa.) he objected to the strong Protestant majority within the new College of Princes (77 Protestant vs 53 Catholic votes, plus 4 alternating votes), where traditionally the Emperor's influence had been the most strongly felt, and he proposed religious parity instead. Discussions regarding this matter were still ongoing when the Empire was dissolved in 1806.

=== Consequences ===
==== End of the ecclesiastical principalities ====
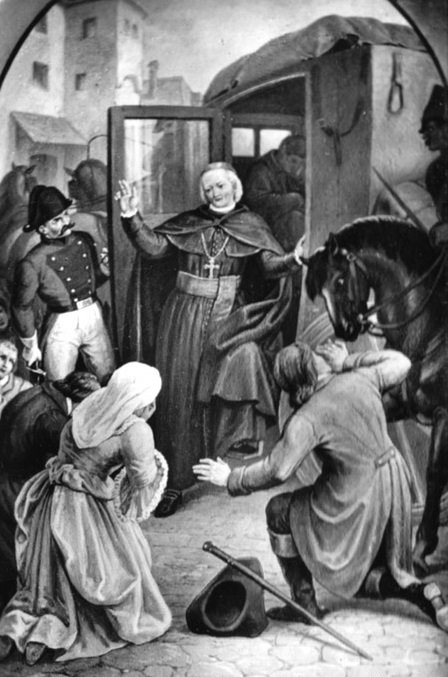
Expulsion of the prince-bishop of Trient in popular imagery

Under the terms of the Final Recess, all the ecclesiastical principalities – archbishoprics, bishoprics and abbeys – were dissolved except for the Archbishopric-Electorate of Mainz, the Teutonic Order and the Order of Malta. Archbishop Karl Theodor von Dalberg of Mainz had salvaged his Electorate by convincing Bonaparte that his position as Imperial Archchancellor was essential to the functioning of the Empire. As much of his Electorate, including the cathedral city of Mainz, had been annexed by France, the archbishopric was translated to Regensburg and augmented with some remnants of the Electorate east of the Rhine, and Wetzlar. Dalberg, who was confirmed as Elector and Imperial Archchancellor and gained the new title of Primate of Germany, was to prove a constant and useful ally of Napoleon during the coming years. In addition, under the dogged insistence of the Emperor, the Teutonic Order, whose Grand Master was generally an Austrian archduke, as well as the Knights of St John (Knights of Malta), were also spared and their scattered small domains were augmented with several nearby abbeys. The intent here was to provide livings for some of the 700 noble members of the cathedral chapters whose property and estates had been expropriated when the prince-bishoprics were secularized. Some prince-bishoprics were transferred whole to a new owner while others, such as Münster, Trier, Cologne, Würzburg, Augsburg, Freising, Eichstätt, Passau and Constance, were either split between two or several new owners or had some districts or exclaves allotted to different new owners. The substantial property and estates of the bishoprics' cathedral chapters were also expropriated.

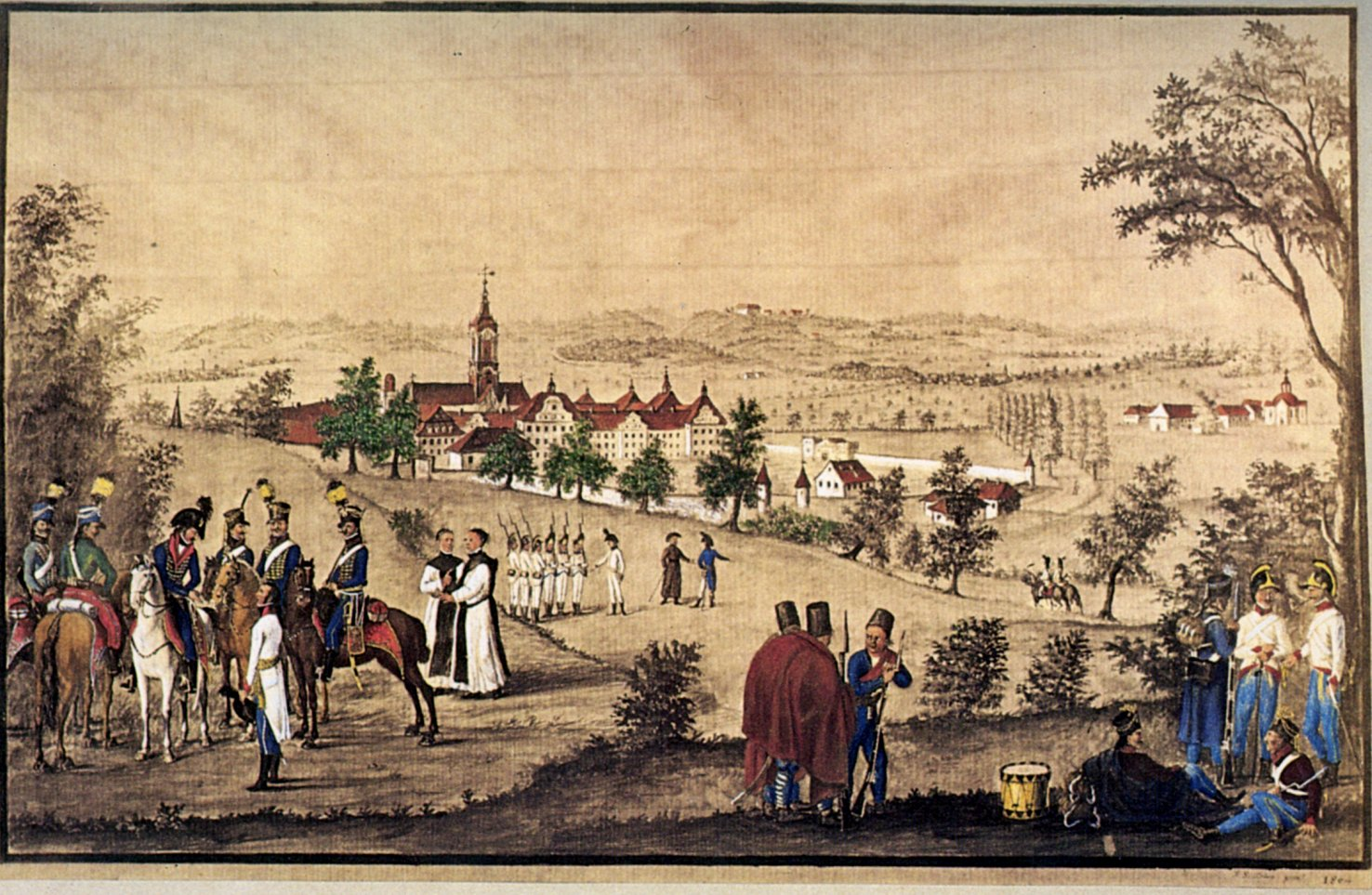
Austrian soldiers and monks at Salem Abbey at the time of secularisation

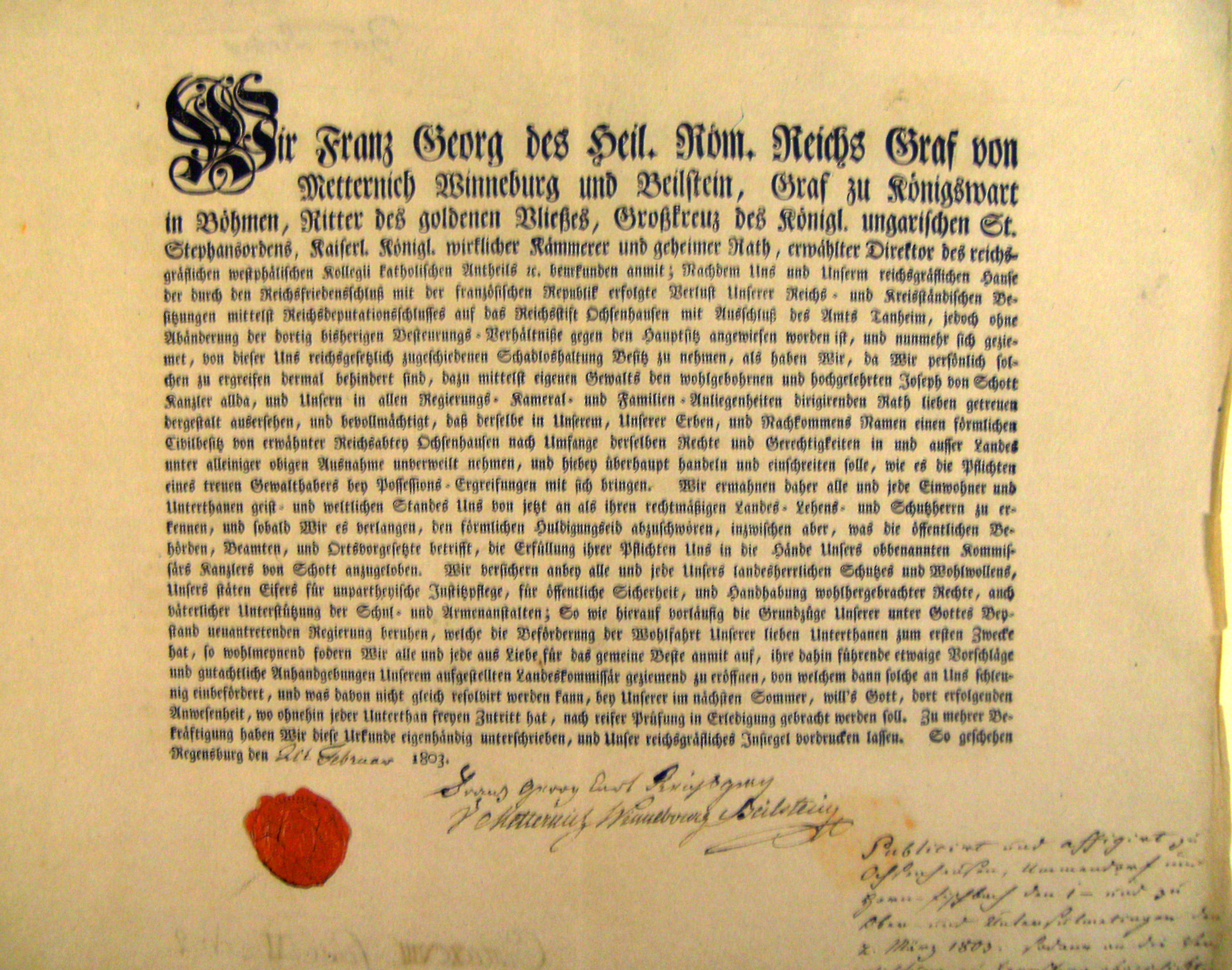
Deed granting the secularized abbey of Ochsenhausen to Count Georg Karl von Metternich

The Final Recess detailed the financial and other obligations of the new rulers toward the former rulers, dignitaries, administrators and other civilian and military personnel of the abolished ecclesiastical principalities. The former prince-bishops and prince-abbots remained immediate to the emperor for their own person. They retained extensive authority, including judicial jurisdiction in civil and some criminal matters over their servants (art. 49). They retained the title and ranking of prince-bishop or prince-abbot for life and were entitled to a number of honors and privileges (art. 50). However, the prince-bishops' palatial residences, such as the Würzburg Residence and Schloss Nordkirchen, passed to new owners and the bishops were granted more modest lodgings as well as the use of a summer residence. The former prince-bishops, prince-abbots and imperial abbots and abbesses were entitled to an annual pension ranging from 20,000 to 60,000 gulden, 6,000 to 12,000 gulden and 3,000 to 6,000 gulden respectively, depending on their past earnings (art. 51). While secularisation stripped the prince-bishops of their political power and abolished their principality, they were still bishops and they retained normal pastoral authority over their diocese, parishes and clergy. Some, such as Bishop Christoph Franz von Buseck of Bamberg, adjusted to their diminished circumstances and stayed in their diocese to carry on their pastoral duties; others, such as Archbishop Hieronymus von Colloredo of Salzburg, abandoned their pastoral duties to auxiliary bishops and went to live in Vienna or on their family estates.

==== Article 35 and the mass secularization of monasteries ====
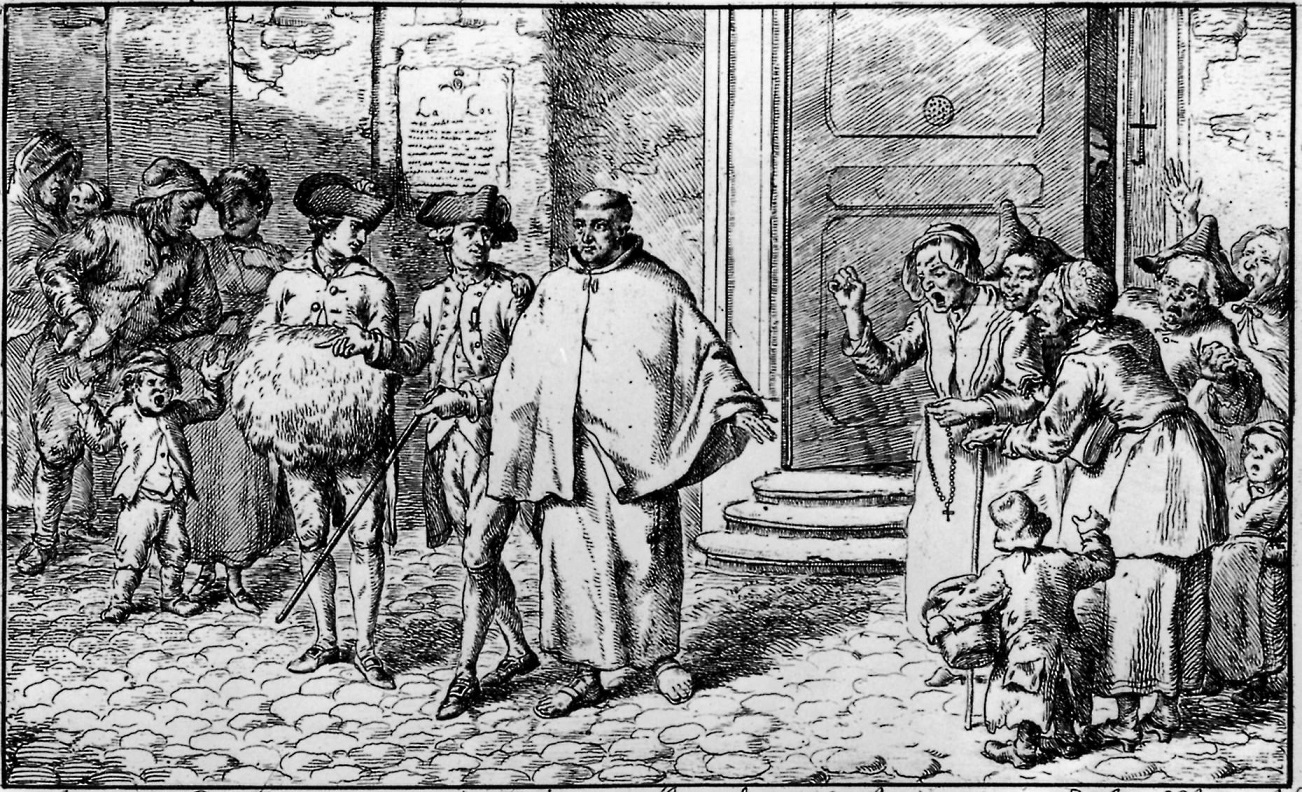
Early 19th century German engraving showing a crowd lamenting the expulsion of a monk from his secularized monastery

In principle, the secularization process only targeted the ecclesiastical principalities – including the 40-odd imperial abbeys – that were immediate and were represented at the Imperial Diet. However, due to the influence of the Enlightenment, growing anticlericalism and a desire to strengthen and modernize the state, exemplified by the policies of Count Maximilian von Montgelas, the influential minister of Elector Max Joseph of Bavaria, as well as the expectation of substantial financial gains, the German rulers decided at the last moment and on their own accord to include in the Final Recess of February 1803 a radical extension of the secularization process – Article 35 – which authorized the secularization of all the non-immediate monasteries, abbeys, convents and other religious houses throughout the empire which were legally subordinate to a territorial ruler.

Already in January 1802 Elector Max Joseph had issued a decree that dissolved 77 Bavarian monasteries and 14 nunneries which were nichtständische (unrepresented at the territorial Estates). Soon after the proclamation of the Recess in February 1803, some 70 Prälatenklöster, which were landständische (represented at the territorial Estates) and as such had traditionally enjoyed considerable autonomy, were secularized as well. The rich Prälatenklöster had controlled approximately 28 per cent of all peasants holdings in Bavaria. Following the simultaneous secularization of so many monasteries by Bavaria and other states and the hurried sale of their assets, including monastic buildings and lands, the market was saturated and the expected financial gain did not materialize. The process resulted in huge losses and the destruction of cultural assets. All rulers did not act at once but by 1812, all but a handful of monasteries and religious houses – about 400 – had been dissolved in South Germany.

In 2003, on the occasion of the 200th anniversary of the Final Recess, Cardinal Karl Lehmann, bishop of Mainz, pointed out that the secularization of 1803 had brought about the greatest territorial upheaval that Germany had experienced up to then, "more drastic than the Protestant Reformation and the Peace of Westphalia" and he emphasized that its implementation had taken place with brute force and reckless violation of religious feeling, at its most brutal in Bavaria, Württemberg and Baden. Monks were dispersed without pension and nuns were parked in central "Aussterbeklöstern". In the wake of secularization and the dissolution of monasteries, people were left more socially disadvantaged than before, and the education system in rural areas collapsed. Among the positive sides he pointed out the improved image of bishops and a Church freed of a power-hungry aristocracy which had seen the Church primarily as a source of wealth.

==== End of the free imperial cities ====
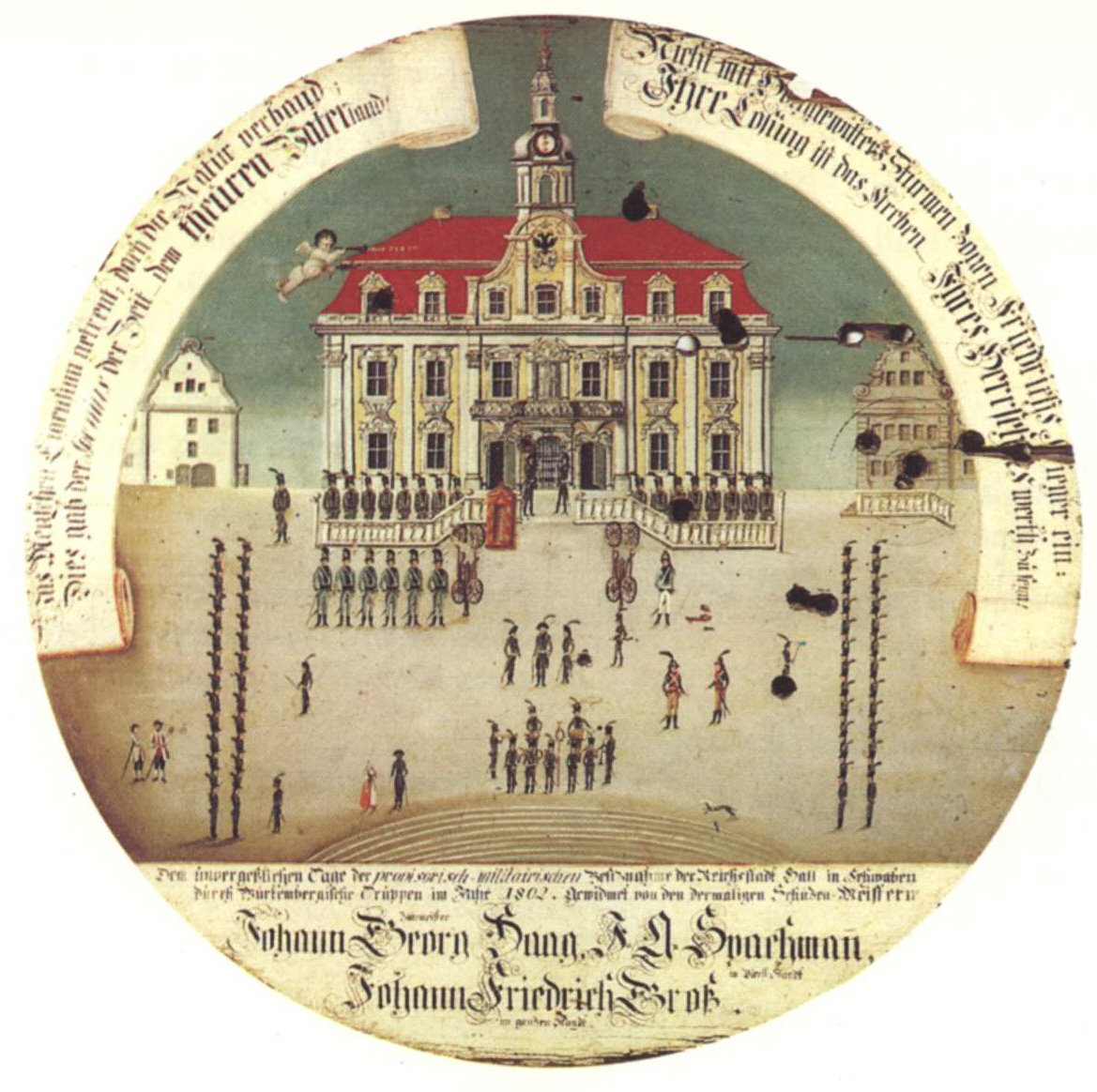
Mediatisation of Schwäbisch Hall in contemporary imagery

The 51 free imperial cities (Note: There were also five remaining Reichsdörfer (Imperial Villages), out of more than 200 in the Middle Ages, that had survived precariously under the Emperor's distant protection. Unlike the imperial cities, they were not represented at the Imperial Diet and in the Circles.) had less to offer in the way of territory (7,365 square kilometres (2,844 sq mi)) or population (815,000) than the ecclesiastical states but the secular princes had long resented the independence of the ones enclaved within their territory. With a few exceptions, they suffered from an even worse reputation of decay and mismanagement than the ecclesiastical states.

A few imperial cities had been included in some of 18th century stillborn secularisation plans, chiefly because they were either contiguous to or enclaved within a prince-bishopric targeted for secularisation. While the secret compensation provisions of the treaties of 1796 with Prussia, Baden and Württemberg targeted only ecclesiastical territories, by the time the Congress of Rastatt opened in late 1797, there were widespread rumors about the abolition of at least some cities. Alarmed by such rumors, the imperial cities of the Swabian Circle, where about half of all the imperial cities were located, held a special conference at Ulm in early March 1798 to examine the situation, for which they felt helpless. However, given that it was expected from the start that the handful of the largest and wealthiest cities would maintain their independence, the expected mediatisation of the imperial cities did not raise much public interest. The survival of an imperial city often hung by a thread: while Regensburg and Wetzlar, seats of the Imperial Diet and the Imperial Cameral Tribunal respectively, were still on the short list of imperial cities that were to survive in the June 1802 general compensation plan, they were mediatised a few months later in order to beef up the newly created Principality of Aschaffenburg that was to constitute the territorial base of Archbishop von Dalberg, the Imperial Archchancellor. In the end, only Hamburg, Bremen, Lübeck, Frankfurt, Augsburg, and Nuremberg survived mediatisation in 1803. Of these, Augsburg was annexed by Bavaria shortly thereafter in 1805 and Nuremberg in 1806. Frankfurt was later annexed by Prussia in 1866 and Lübeck (mostly by Prussia, partly by Mecklenburg) in 1937. Only the Free Imperial Cities of Hamburg and Bremen remain independent states within Germany, joined by Berlin as a third city-state.

==== Compensation ====
While the original intent had been to compensate the dispossessed secular rulers only for lost territory, that criterion was to be applied only to the minor princes and the counts who sometimes only received an annuity or a territorial compensation so modest that it had to be augmented with an annuity paid by better provisioned princes in order that their total income would not be less than their former income. (Note: For example, the Count of Metternich received compensation in the form of the Abbey of Ochsenhausen, subject however to the obligation to pay a total of 20,000 Gulden in annual pension to three as part of their compensation package: the Count of Aspremont (850 Gulden), the Count of Quadt (11,000 Gulden) and the Count of Wartenberg (8,150 Gulden).)

In the case of the larger states, they generally received more than the territory they had lost. Baden received over seven times as much, Prussia nearly five times. Hanover gained the Prince-Bishopric of Osnabrück, having lost nothing. The Duchy of Oldenburg received much of the Prince-Bishopric of Münster although it had lost only the income of a toll station, and Austria did well also. In addition, the two Habsburg archdukes who had been dispossessed of their Italian realms (the Grand Duchy of Tuscany and the Duchy of Modena) were also compensated even though their realms were not part of the Holy Roman Empire. Likewise, the King of Prussia was able to obtain a generous territorial compensation for the dynastically related Prince of Orange-Nassau for the loss of the hereditary stadtholdership of the Netherlands.

In all, 112 imperial estates disappeared. Apart from the territory ceded to France, their land and properties were distributed among the seventy-two rulers entitled to compensation.

The outcome of the compensation process confirmed by the Final Recess of February 1803 was the most extensive redistribution of property in German history before 1945. Approximately 73,000 km^{2} (28,000 sq mi) of ecclesiastical territory, with some 2.36 million inhabitants and 12.72 million guildens per annum of revenue was transferred to new rulers.

The position of the established Roman Catholic Church in Germany, the Reichskirche, was not only diminished, but nearly destroyed. The Church lost its crucial constitutional role in the Empire; most of the Catholic universities were closed, as well as hundreds of monasteries and religious foundations. It has been said that the Final Recess of 1803 did to German land ownership what the Revolution had done to France.

== Mediatisation from 1806 ==
=== Assault on the imperial knights and counts ===
Following the Final Recess, the scattered estates of approximately 300 free imperial knights and 99 imperial counts, totaling perhaps 4,500 square miles, should have remained untouched. But by the winter of 1803, the rulers of Bavaria, Hesse-Kassel, and Württemberg began to take possession of these tiny enclaves through a combination of "Surrender and Transfer Edicts" (Abtretungs- und Überweisungspatenten) and military force, and other smaller rulers, such as the Prince of Leiningen, followed suit. This came to be known as the Rittersturm.

By autumn 1803, the majority of the knightly estates were de facto annexed by their larger neighbors but in January 1804, Emperor Francis II declared the seizures illegal. Although the Emperor was unable to reverse the annexations, the threat of force put a stop to further seizures. Still, this violence was to have grave consequences for the small princes of the Empire. With the effective end of imperial governance following the Treaty of Pressburg in 1805, the violence done unto the knights and counts was extended to these defenseless princes, resulting in a second great mediatisation in 1806.

The formal mediatisation of the imperial knights and counts was legalized by Article 25 of the Treaty of the Confederation of the Rhine (Rheinbundakte), which sanctioned unilateral action by territorial states.

On 12 June 1806, Napoleon established the Confederation of the Rhine to extend and help secure the eastern border of France. In reluctant recognition of Napoleon's dismemberment of imperial territory, on 6 August 1806 Emperor Francis II declared the Holy Roman Empire abolished, and claimed as much power as he could retain as ruler of the Habsburg Realm. To gain support from the more powerful German states, the former Holy Roman Emperor accepted, and Napoleon encouraged, those that remained to mediatise their minor neighbouring states. Mediatisation transferred the sovereignty of more than 100 small secular states to their larger neighbours, most of whom became founding members of the Confederation in order to participate in the annexations.

Area and population losses or gains (rounded)
| | Losses | Gains | Net gains |
|---|---|---|---|
| Prussia | 2,000 km^{2} 140,000 people | 12,000 km^{2} 600,000 people | 10,000 km^{2} 460,000 people |
| Bavaria | 10,000 km^{2} 600,000 people | 14,000 km^{2} 850,000 people | 4,000 km^{2} 250,000 people |
| Baden | 450 km^{2} 30,000 people | 2,000 km^{2} 240,000 people | 1,550 km^{2} 210,000 people |
| Württemberg | 400 km^{2} 30,000 people | 1,500 km^{2} 120,000 people | 1,100 km^{2} 90,000 people |

Between the first abdication of Napoleon in 1814 and the Battle of Waterloo and the final abdication of Napoleon in 1815, the Congress of Vienna was convened by the Great Powers to redraw the borders of Europe. During this time, it was decided that the mediatised principalities, free cities, and secularised states would not be reinstated. Instead, the former rulers who held a vote within the Imperial Diet were to enjoy an improved aristocratic status, being deemed equal to the still-reigning monarchs for marital purposes, and entitled to claim compensation for their losses. But it was left to each of the annexing states to compensate mediatised dynasties, and the latter had no international right to redress if dissatisfied with the new regime's reimbursement decisions. In 1825 and 1829, those noble houses which had been designated the mediatised houses were formalised, at the sole discretion of the ruling states, and not all houses that ruled states that were mediatised were recognised as such.

As a result of the Congress of Vienna, only 39 German states remained.

== Appendix ==
=== Disbursement of the prince-bishoprics and archbishoprics ===
| Awarded to | Mediatised state |
|---|---|
| France and client states (previously annexed) | Basel (to the Rauracian Republic); Chur (to the Helvetic Republic); Cologne: left bank; Liège; Mainz: left bank; Speyer: left bank; Strasbourg: left bank; Trier: left bank; Worms: left bank |
| Duke of Arenberg | Cologne: County of Vest Recklinghausen; Münster: Meppen |
| Archduke of Austria | Brixen; Freising: Austrian exclaves; Salzburg: Austrian exclaves of Arnsdorf and Traismauer; Trent |
| Margrave of Baden | Basel: Lordship of Schliengen; Constance; Speyer: right bank; Strasbourg: right bank |
| Elector of Bavaria | Augsburg; Bamberg; Freising; Passau; Würzburg |
| Duke of Croÿ | Münster: Dülmen |
| Elector of Hanover | Osnabrück |
| Landgrave of Hesse-Darmstadt | Cologne: Duchy of Westphalia; Worms: right bank |
| Duke of Looz-Corswarem | Münster: Rheina and Wolbeck |
| Princes of Nassau | Trier: right bank |
| Prince of Nassau-Orange-Fulda | Cologne: Duchy of Westphalia |
| Duke of Oldenburg | Lübeck; Münster: Vechta and Cloppenburg |
| King of Prussia | Hildesheim; Münster: Münster; Paderborn |
| Archbishop of Regensburg | Mainz: right bank; Regensburg |
| Princes of Salm | Münster: Ahaus and Bocholt |
| Grand Duke of Salzburg | Eichstätt; Salzburg |

=== Disbursement of the imperial abbeys, convents and provostries ===
| Awarded to | Mediatised state |
|---|---|
| France and client states (previously annexed) | Burtscheid; Prüm; St. Cornelimünster; St. Gall (to the Helvetic Republic); Stablo-Malmedy; Thorn; Weissenburg |
| Count of Aspremont-Lynden | Baindt |
| Margrave of Baden | Gengenbach; Odenheim and Bruchsal; Petershausen; Salem (Salmansweiler) |
| Elector of Bavaria | Elchingen; Irsee; Kaisheim (Kaisersheim); Kempten; Ottobeuren; Roggenburg; St. Ulrich and St. Afra; Söflingen; Ursberg; Wettenhausen |
| Duke of Breisgau-Modena | St. Peter; Schuttern |
| Prince of Bretzenheim | Lindau |
| Duke of Brunswick-Wolfenbüttel | Gandersheim; St. Ludger |
| Prince of Dietrichstein | St. Gall: Neuravensburg |
| Prince of Ligne | Edelstetten |
| Prince of Metternich | Ochsenhausen |
| Prince of Nassau-Orange-Fulda | Corvey (Diocese 1792); Fulda; Einsiedeln: St. Gerold im Weingartischen (sold to Austria in 1804); Weingarten |
| Count of Ostein | Buxheim |
| Count of Plettenberg-Wittem | Heggbach: Mietingen and Sullmingen |
| King of Prussia | Essen; Herford; Quedlinburg; Werden-Helmstedt |
| Count of Quadt | St. George in Isny |
| Archbishopric of Regensburg | Niedermünster-in-Regensburg; Obermünster-in-Regensburg; St. Emmeram |
| Order of St. John | St. Blaise |
| Grand Duke of Salzburg | Berchtesgaden |
| Count of Schaesberg-Retersbeck | Ochsenhausen: Tannheim |
| Prince of Sinzendorf | Ochsenhausen: Winterrieden |
| Count of Sternberg-Manderscheid | Schussenried; Weissenau |
| Prince of Thurn and Taxis | Buchau; Marchtal; Neresheim |
| Count of Törring-Jettenbach | Gutenzell |
| Count of Waldbott von Bassenheim | Heggbach |
| Count of Wartenberg | Rot an der Rot |
| Duke of Württemberg | Ellwangen; Heiligkreuztal; Rottenmünster; Schöntal; Zwiefalten |

The only ecclesiastical entities in Germany not abolished in 1803 were:

- Teutonic Order (abolished in 1810)
- Knights of St. John (abolished in 1806)
- Archbishopric of Regensburg (abolished in 1805)

=== Disbursement of the Free Imperial Cities and villages ===
| Awarded to | Mediatised state |
|---|---|
| France | Aachen; Cologne (Köln); Speyer; Worms |
| Elector of Bavaria | Bopfingen; Buchhorn (Friedrichshafen); Dinkelsbühl; Kaufbeuren; Kempten im Allgäu; Leutkirch im Allgäu; Memmingen; Nördlingen; Ravensburg; Rothenburg ob der Tauber; Schweinfurt; Ulm; Wangen im Allgäu; Weißenburg im Nordgau; Windsheim; Gochsheim (Imperial village); Sennfeld (Imperial village); The free men of the Leutkircher Heath (Imperial village) |
| King of Prussia | Goslar; Mühlhausen; Nordhausen |
| Margrave of Baden | Biberach an der Riß; Gengenbach; Offenburg; Pfullendorf; Überlingen; Wimpfen; Zell am Harmersbach |
| Duke of Württemberg | Aalen; Esslingen am Neckar; Giengen; Heilbronn; Reutlingen; Rottweil; Schwäbisch Gmünd; Schwäbisch Hall; Weil |
| Landgrave of Hesse-Darmstadt | Friedberg |
| Prince of Nassau-Usingen | Soden (Imperial village); Sulzbach (Imperial village) |
| Prince of Nassau-Orange-Fulda | Dortmund |
| Prince of Bretzenheim | Lindau (sold to Austria in 1804) |
| Count of Quadt | Isny im Allgäu |
| Archbishop of Regensburg | Regensburg; Wetzlar |

The only free cities in Germany not abolished in 1803 were:

- Augsburg (annexed to Bavaria 1806)
- Bremen (annexed to France 1811, restored 1814)
- Frankfurt (annexed to Regensburg 1806, restored 1813, annexed to Prussia 1866)
- The Imperial Valley of the Harmersbach (annexed to Baden 1806)
- Hamburg (annexed to France 1811, restored 1814)
- Lübeck (annexed to France 1811, restored 1814, abolished 1937)
- Nuremberg (annexed to Bavaria 1806)

=== Members of the Imperial Diet mediatised in 1806 ===
| Immediate prince | Mediatised state |
|---|---|
| Duke of Arenberg | Croÿ-Dülmen |
| Grand Duke of Baden | Prince of Auersperg; Prince of Fürstenberg; Prince of Leiningen; Count of Leiningen-Billigheim; Count of Leiningen-Neudenau; Count of Löwenstein-Wertheim-Freudenberg: Wertheim left bank; Prince of Löwenstein-Wertheim-Rosenberg: Wertheim left bank; Knights of St. John: bailiwick on upper Rhine; Prince of Salm-Reifferscheid-Hainsbach: right bank; Prince of Salm-Reifferscheid-Krautheim: right bank; Prince of Schwarzenberg: Klettgau; Count of Sickingen |
| King of Bavaria | Baron of Boyneburg-Bömelberg: Erolzheim; Count of Castell-Castell; Count of Castell-Rüdenhausen; Prince of Esterházy de Galántha: Edelstetten; Prince of Fugger-Babenhausen; Count of Fugger-Glött; Count of Fugger-Kirchberg-Weissenhorn; Count of Fugger-Kirchheim; Count of Fugger-Nordendorf; Prince of Lobkowicz; Count of Löwenstein-Wertheim-Freudenberg: exclaves; Prince of Löwenstein-Wertheim-Rosenberg: exclaves; Count of Ortenburg-Tambach; Count of Ostein; Prince of Öttingen-Spielberg; Prince of Öttingen-Wallerstein; Count of Pappenheim: Altmühl canton; Count of Schönborn-Wiesentheid; Prince of Schwarzenberg; Prince of Sinzendorf; Count of Stadion-Thannhausen; Prince of Thurn and Taxis: Neuburg area; Count of Waldbott von Bassenheim; Prince of Waldburg-Zeil-Trauchburg: Alt-Trauchburg; Prince of Waldburg-Zeil-Wurzach: Ferthofen |
| Grand Duke of Berg | Count of Bentheim-Steinfurt: Bentheim; Count of Bentheim-Steinfurt: Steinfurt; Count of Limburg-Styrum: Styrum; Count of Leiningen-Altleiningen: Schadeck & Westerburg; Duke of Looz-Corswarem; Count of Nesselrode: Rhade; Count of Salm-Horstmar; Prince of Sayn-Wittgenstein-Berleburg: Homburg; Count of Wallmoden-Gimborn; Prince of Wied-Runkel: Runkel |
| Hesse-Darmstadt, Grand Duke of Hesse | Count of Erbach-Erbach; Count of Erbach-Fürstenau; Count of Erbach-Schönberg; Landgrave of Hesse-Homburg; Count of Leiningen-Westerburg-Altleiningen: Ilbenstadt; Prince of Löwenstein-Wertheim-Rosenberg: Breuberg, Heubach & Habizheim; Prince of Sayn-Wittgenstein-Berleburg; Prince of Sayn-Wittgenstein-Hohnstein; Count of Schlitz genannt von Görtz; Count of Solms-Baruth; Prince of Solms-Braunfels; Prince of Solms-Hohensolms-Lich; Count of Solms-Laubach; Count of Solms-Rödelheim-Assenheim; Prince of Stolberg-Rossla; Prince of Stolberg-Wernigerode: Gedern; Prince of Wied-Neuwied; Prince of Wied-Runkel |
| Prince of Hohenzollern-Sigmaringen | Prince of Fürstenberg: Jungnau & Trochtelfingen; Prince of Thurn and Taxis: Strasberg & Ostrach |
| Prince of Isenburg | Count of Isenburg-Büdingen; Count of Isenburg-Meerholz; Count of Isenburg-Wächtersbach; Count of Schönborn-Wiesentheid: Heusenstamm |
| Princes of Nassau | Prince of Anhalt-Bernburg-Hoym; Count of Leiningen-Westerburg-Neuleiningen: Engelthal; Count of Nesselrode: Reichenstein; Prince of Solms-Braunfels: Braunfels & Greifenstein; Prince of Solms-Hohensolms-Lich: Hohensolms |
| Archbishopric of Regensburg | Prince of Colloredo-Mansfeld: Rieneck; Count of Erbach-Erbach: Wildenstein; Count of Löwenstein-Wertheim-Freudenberg: Wertheim right bank; Prince of Löwenstein-Wertheim-Rosenberg: Wertheim right bank |
| Prince of Salm-Kyrburg | Baron of Boyneburg-Bömelberg: Gemen |
| King of Saxony | Count of Solms-Baruth; Count of Solms-Wildenfels |
| King of Württemberg | Count of Aspremont-Lynden; Prince of Dietrichstein; Prince of Fürstenberg: Gundelfingen and Neufra; Count of Grävenitz; Prince of Hohenlohe-Langenburg-Ingelfingen; Count of Hohenlohe-Langenburg-Kirchberg; Prince of Hohenlohe-Langenburg-Langenburg; Prince of Hohenlohe-Waldenburg-Bartenstein; Prince of Hohenlohe-Waldenburg-Jagstberg; Prince of Hohenlohe-Waldenburg-Schillingsfürst; Count of Königsegg-Aulendorf; Count of Löwenstein-Wertheim-Freudenberg: Limpurg; Prince of Löwenstein-Wertheim-Rosenberg: Limpurg; Prince of Metternich; Count of Neipperg; Count of Plettenberg-Mietingen; Count of Pückler and Limpurg; Count of Quadt-Isny; Count of Rechteren-Limpurg; Prince of Salm-Reifferscheid-Hainsbach: left bank; Prince of Salm-Reifferscheid-Krautheim: left bank; Count of Schaesberg-Tannheim; Prince of Solms-Braunfels: Limpurg; Prince of Solms-Hohensolms-Lich: Limpurg; Count of Stadion-Warthausen; Countess of Sternberg-Manderscheid; Prince of Thurn and Taxis; Count of Törring-Jettenbach; Prince of Waldburg-Wolfegg-Waldsee; Prince of Waldburg-Zeil-Trauchburg; Prince of Waldburg-Zeil-Wurzach; Count and Countess of Waldeck-Limpurg; Count of Wartenberg-Roth; Prince of Windisch-Grätz Elder line |
| Grand Duke of Würzburg | Prince of Löwenstein-Wertheim-Rosenberg: Bronnbach |

=== States mediatised after 1806 ===
| Mediatised by | Date | Mediatised state |
|---|---|---|
| King of Westphalia | 1807 | Elector of Hanover; Elector of Hesse(-Cassel); Prince of Kaunitz-Rietberg; Count of Platen-Hallermund; Prince of Stolberg-Wernigerode |
| Grand Duke of Berg | 1808 | Count of Bentheim-Tecklenburg: Rheda; Count of Bentheim-Tecklenburg: Limburg-Hohenlimburg |
| Kingdom of Württemberg | 1810 | Teutonic Order: bailiwick of Mergentheim |
| France | 1810 | Duke of Arenberg; Lordship of In- and Kniphausen; Grand Duke of Oldenburg; Prince of Salm-Kyrburg; Prince of Salm-Salm |
| King of Prussia (status quo of 1806 restored) | 1813 | Grand Duke of Berg; King of Westphalia |
| Austria | 1813 | Prince of Leyen |
| Congress of Vienna | 1814 | Grand Duke of Frankfurt; Prince of Isenburg |
| Bavaria | 1814 | Grand Duke of Würzburg |

=== Restored sovereign states ===
After being abolished or mediatised, very few states were recreated. Those that were included:

- Free City of Bremen
- Free City of Frankfurt
- Free City of Hamburg
- Kingdom of Hanover
- Electorate of Hesse(-Cassel)
- Landgraviate of Hesse-Homburg
- Lordship of In- and Kniphausen
- Free City of Lübeck
- Grand Duchy of Oldenburg

== See also ==
- Mediatised houses
- List of states in the Holy Roman Empire
- List of Imperial Diet participants (1792)
