= Reallocation of votes in the Imperial Diet (1803) =

The Imperial Diet was the primary legislative body in the Holy Roman Empire after 1648. Various princes, bishops, abbots and free cities convened in Regensburg to vote upon and enact laws across the Empire. The allocation of votes were carefully considered with a goal of maintaining balance between Protestant and Catholic princes. Votes were cast by princes in relation to the number of estates with voting rights and the members were arranged into 3 colleges; and 2 prelate benches, 4 count benches, and 2 free city benches.

Following the French Revolution, French forces defeated Imperial forces and occupied most Imperial land on the left bank of the Rhine. France formally annexed the left bank by the Treaty of Campo Formio in 1797, and German princes were stripped of this land though it was not until the Treaty of Lunéville in 1801 that this was enforced. The Treaty of Lunéville also specified that princes that lost land to France, as well as certain dispossessed Italian princes, were to be compensated with new lands elsewhere in the Empire. It was swiftly decided that the ecclesiastical principalities and free cities would be suppressed and dispersed.

The compensation was arranged according to a plan devised between the French and Russian delegations in 1802. In drafting the compensation for the dispossessed nobility, the French ambassador Talleyrand received substantial bribes (estimated as much as 10 million francs) from nobility clamouring for more favourable settlements. In general the more French-friendly princes received far greater compensation. As votes in the Imperial Diet were tied to specific territories the voting members possessed, the allocation of votes in the Diet also needed to be updated to both remove lands that were ceded to France as well as update to the new political landscape. Several members, particularly Austria, Bavaria and Prussia, received several new votes from preexisting members. The order of existing votes were also shuffled to some extent. Several counts from the four comital benches were also raised to the princes' college. In effect the number of votes in the College of Princes increased from 100 to 131.

An Imperial deputation (Reichsdeputation) approved the plan on 25 February 1803, and the Imperial Diet universally ratified this Reichsdeputationshauptschluss on 24 March. The Emperor Francis II, Holy Roman Emperor ratified it on 27 April that year and it became law despite the Emperor's reservations regarding the reallocation of votes in the Imperial Diet as the balance between Protestant and Catholic estates being altered heavily in the formers' favour.

The following tables lists the members in the Imperial Diet in 1792 before the loss of territory to France, and the reallocated votes as per the Reichsdeputationhauptschluss in 1803. 1792 territories in italics were annexed by France. The lists below uses the interchanged voting of Ecclesiastical and Secular princes format. Ecclesiastical territories are shaded purple, and free cities are shaded red.

== College of Electors ==
1792	Owner 1792	1803	Owner 1803
1. Archbishop of Mainz	Archbishop of Mainz	1. Arch-Chancellor Elector	Arch-Chancellor Elector
2. Archbishop of Trier	Archbishop of Trier	Abolished	
3. Archbishop of Cologne	Archbishop of Cologne	Abolished	
4. King of Bohemia	Archduke of Austria	2. King of Bohemia	Archduke of Austria
5. Elector of Bavaria-Palatinate	Elector of Bavaria-Palatinate	3. Elector of Bavaria	Elector of Bavaria
6. Elector of Saxony	Elector of Saxony	4. Elector of Saxony	Elector of Saxony
7. Elector of Brandenburg	King of Prussia	5. Elector of Brandenburg	King of Prussia
8. Elector of Brunswick-Lüneburg	King of Great Britain as Duke of Hanover	6. Elector of Brunswick-Lüneburg	King of Great Britain as Duke of Hanover
—		7. Grand Duke of Salzburg	Grand Duke of Salzburg
—		8. Elector of Württemberg	Elector of Württemberg
—		9. Elector of Baden	Elector of Baden
—		10. Elector of Hesse (Hesse-Cassel)	Elector of Hesse (Hesse-Cassel)

== College of Princes ==
1792	Owner 1792	1803	Owner 1803
1. Archduke of Austria	Archduke of Austria	1. Archduke of Austria	Archduke of Austria
2. Duke of Bavaria	Elector of Bavaria-Palatinate	2. Duke of Upper Bavaria	Elector of Bavaria
3. Duke of Burgundy	Archduke of Austria	3. Duchy of Styria	Archduke of Austria
4. Duke of Magdeburg	King of Prussia	4. Duke of Magdeburg	King of Prussia
5. Archbishop of Salzburg	Archbishop of Salzburg	5. Grand Duke of Salzburg	Grand Duke of Salzburg
6. Duke of Palatinate-Lautern	Elector of Bavaria-Palatinate	6. Duke of Lower Bavaria	Elector of Bavaria
7. Archbishop of Besançon	Archbishop of Besançon	7. Prince of Regensburg	Arch-Chancellor Elector
8. Duke of Palatinate-Simmern	Elector of Bavaria-Palatinate	8. Duke of Sulzbach	Elector of Bavaria
9. Grandmaster of the Teutonic Order	Grandmaster of the Teutonic Order	9. Grandmaster of the Teutonic Order	Grandmaster of the Teutonic Order
10. Duke of Neuburg	Elector of Bavaria-Palatinate	10. Duke of Neuburg	Elector of Bavaria
11. Bishop of Bamberg	Bishop of Bamberg	11. Prince of Bamberg	Elector of Bavaria
12. Duke of Bremen	King of Great Britain as Duke of Hanover	12. Duke of Bremen	King of Great Britain as Duke of Hanover
13. Bishop of Würzburg	Bishop of Würzburg	13. Margrave of Meissen	Elector of Saxony
14. Duke of Palatinate-Zweibrücken	Duke of Palatinate-Zweibrücken (heir to Bavaria-Palatinate)	14. Duke of Berg	Elector of Bavaria
15. Bishop of Worms	Bishop of Worms	15. Duke of Würzburg	Elector of Bavaria
16. Duke of Palatinate-Veldenz	Elector of Bavaria-Palatinate	16. Duke of Carinthia	Archduke of Austria
17. Bishop of Eichstätt	Bishop of Eichstätt	17. Prince of Eichstätt	Grand Duke of Salzburg
18. Duke of Saxe-Weimar	Duke of Saxe-Weimar	18. Duke of Saxe-Coburg	Duke of Saxe-Coburg-Saalfeld; Duke of Saxe-Meiningen
19. Bishop of Speyer	Bishop of Speyer	19. Prince of Odenheim and Bruchsal	Elector of Baden
20. Duke of Saxe-Eisenach	Duke of Saxe-Weimar	20. Duke of Saxe-Gotha	Duke of Saxe-Altenburg
21. Bishop of Strasbourg	Bishop of Strasbourg	21. Prince of Ettenheim	Elector of Baden
22. Duke of Saxe-Coburg	Duke of Saxe-Altenburg	22. Duke of Saxe-Altenburg	Duke of Saxe-Altenburg
23. Bishop of Constance	Bishop of Constance	23. Prince of Constance	Elector of Baden
24. Duke of Saxe-Gotha	Duke of Saxe-Altenburg	24. Duke of Saxe-Weimar	Duke of Saxe-Weimar
25. Bishop of Augsburg	Bishop of Augsburg	25. Prince of Augsburg	Elector of Bavaria
26. Duke of Saxe-Altenburg	Duke of Saxe-Altenburg	26. Duke of Saxe-Eisenach	Duke of Saxe-Eisenach
27. Bishop of Hildesheim	Bishop of Hildesheim	27. Prince of Hildesheim	King of Prussia
28. Margrave of Brandenburg-Bayreuth	King of Prussia	28. Margrave of Brandenburg-Ansbach	King of Prussia
29. Bishop of Paderborn	Bishop of Paderborn	29. Prince of Paderborn	King of Prussia
30. Margrave of Brandenburg-Ansbach	King of Prussia	30. Margrave of Brandenburg-Bayreuth	King of Prussia
31. Bishop of Freising	Bishop of Fresing	31. Prince of Freising	Elector of Bavaria
32. Duke of Brunswick and Lüneburg	King of Great Britain as Duke of Hanover	32. Duke of Brunswick-Wolfenbüttel	Duke of Brunswick-Wolfenbüttel
33. Bishop of Regensburg	Bishop of Regensburg	33. Duke of Thuringia	Elector of Saxony; alternating Duke of Saxe-Weimar and Duke of Saxe-Altenburg
34. Duke of Brunswick-Calenberg	King of Great Britain as Duke of Hanover	34. Duke of Brunswick and Lüneburg	King of Great Britain as Duke of Hanover
35. Bishop of Passau	Bishop of Passau	35. Prince of Passau	Elector of Bavaria
36. Duke of Brunswick-Wolfenbüttel	Duke of Brunswick-Wolfenbüttel	36. Duke of Brunswick-Calenberg	King of Great Britain as Duke of Hanover
37. Bishop of Trent	Bishop of Trent	37. Prince of Trent	Archduke of Austria
38. Duke of Brunswick-Grubenhagen	King of Great Britain as Duke of Hanover	38. Duke of Brunswick-Grubenhagen	King of Great Britain as Duke of Hanover
39. Bishop of Brixen	Bishop of Brixen	39. Prince of Brixen	Archduke of Austria
40. Prince of Verden	King of Great Britain as Duke of Hanover	40. Prince of Halberstadt	King of Prussia
41. Bishop of Basel	Bishop of Basel	41. Duke of Carniola	Archduke of Austria
42. Prince of Halberstadt	King of Prussia	42. Margrave of Baden-Baden	Elector of Baden
43. Bishop of Liège	Bishop of Liège	43. Duke of Teck	Elector of Württemberg
44. Duke of Württemberg	Duke of Württemberg	44. Margrave of Baden-Durlach	Elector of Baden
45. Bishop of Osnabrück	Bishop of Osnabrück	45. Prince of Osnabrück	King of Great Britain as Duke of Hanover
46. Landgrave of Hesse-Cassel	Landgrave of Hesse-Cassel	46. Prince of Verden	King of Great Britain as Duke of Hanover
47. Bishop of Münster	Bishop of Münster	47. Prince of Münster	King of Prussia
48. Landgrave of Hesse-Darmstadt	Landgrave of Hesse-Darmstadt	48. Margrave of Baden-Hochberg	Elector of Baden
49. Bishop of Lübeck	Bishop of Lübeck	49. Prince of Lübeck	Duke of Oldenburg
50. Margrave of Baden-Baden	Margave of Baden	50. Duke of Württemberg	Elector of Württemberg
51. Bishop of Chur	Bishop of Chur	51. Prince of Hanau	Elector of Hesse (Hesse-Cassel)
52. Margrave of Baden-Durlach	Margave of Baden	52. Duke of Holstein-Glückstadt	King of Denmark
53. Bishop of Fulda	Bishop of Fulda	53. Prince of Fulda	Prince of Nassau-Dillenburg
54. Margrave of Baden-Hochberg	Margave of Baden	54. Duke of Oldenburg	Duke of Oldenburg
55. Abbot of Kempten	Abbot of Kempten	55. Prince of Kempten	Elector of Bavaria
56. Duke of Mecklenburg-Schwerin	Duke of Mecklenburg-Schwerin	56. Duke of Mecklenburg-Schwerin	Duke of Mecklenburg-Schwerin
57. Provost of Ellwangen	Provost of Ellwangen	57. Prince of Ellwangen	Elector of Württemberg
58. Duke of Mecklenburg-Güstrow	Duke of Mecklenburg-Schwerin	58. Duke of Mecklenburg-Güstrow	Duke of Mecklenburg-Schwerin
59. Grandmaster of the Order of St John	Grandmaster of the Order of St John	59. Grandmaster of the Order of St John	Grandmaster of the Order of St John
60. Duke of Hither Pomerania	King of Sweden	60. Landgrave of Hesse-Darmstadt	Landgrave of Hesse (Hesse-Darmstadt)
61. Provost of Berchtesgaden	Provost of Berchtesgaden	61. Prince of Berchtesgaden	Grand Duke of Salzburg
62. Duke of Farther Pomerania	King of Prussia	62. Landgrave of Hesse-Cassel	Elector of Hesse (Hesse-Cassel)
63. Provost of Weißenburg	Bishop of Speyer	63. Duke of Westphalia	Landgrave of Hesse (Hesse-Darmstadt)
64. Duke of Saxe-Lauenburg	King of Great Britain as Duke of Hanover	64. Duke of Hither Pomerania	King of Sweden
65. Abbot of Prüm	Archbishop of Trier	65. Duke of Holstein-Plön	King of Denmark
66. Prince of Minden	King of Prussia	66. Duke of Farther Pomerania	King of Prussia
67. Abbot of Stavelot-Malmedy	Abbot of Stavelot-Malmedy	67. Landgrave of Breisgau	Duke of Modena-Breisgau
68. Duke of Holstein-Glückstadt	King of Denmark	68. Duke of Saxe-Lauenburg	King of Great Britain as Duke of Hanover
69. Bishop of Corvey	Bishop of Corvey	69. Prince of Corvey	Prince of Nassau-Dillenburg
70. Duke of Oldenburg	Duke of Oldenburg	70. Prince of Minden	King of Prussia
71. Duke of Savoy	King of Piedmont-Sardinia	71. Burgrave of Meissen	Elector of Saxony
72. Landgrave of Leuchtenberg	Elector of Bavaria-Palatinate	72. Landgrave of Leuchtenberg	Elector of Bavaria
73. Duke of Anhalt	Dukes of Anhalt-Bernburg, Anhalt-Dessau, Anhalt-Köthen and Anhalt-Zerbst	73. Duke of Anhalt	Dukes of Anhalt-Bernburg, Anhalt-Dessau and Anhalt-Köthen
74. Princely Count of Henneberg	Elector of Saxony; Duke of Saxe-Weimar; Duke of Saxe-Hildburghausen	74. Princely Count of Henneberg	Elector of Saxony; Duke of Saxe-Weimar; Duke of Saxe-Hildburghausen
75. Prince of Schwerin	Duke of Mecklenburg-Schwerin	75. Prince of Schwerin	Duke of Mecklenburg-Schwerin
76. Prince of Cammin	King of Prussia	76. Prince of Cammin	King of Prussia
77. Prince of Ratzeburg	Duke of Mecklenburg-Strelitz	77. Prince of Ratzeburg	Duke of Mecklenburg-Strelitz
78. Prince of Hersfeld	Landgrave of Hesse-Cassel	78. Prince of Hersfeld	Elector of Hesse (Hesse-Cassel)
79. Margrave of Nomény	Archduke of Austria	79. Count of the Tyrol	Archduke of Austria
80. Prince of Montbéliard	Duke of Württemberg	80. Count Palatine of Tübingen	Elector of Württemberg
—		81. Prince of Querfurt	Elector of Saxony
81. Duke of Arenberg	Duke of Arenberg	82. Duke of Arenberg (in Meppen & Vest Recklinghausen)	Duke of Arenberg
82. Prince of Hohenzollern-Hohenzollern	Prince of Hohenzollern-Hechingen	83. Prince of Hohenzollern-Hechingen	Prince of Hohenzollern-Hechingen
83. Prince of Lobkowicz	Prince of Lobkowicz	84. Prince of Lobkowicz	Prince of Lobkowicz
—		85. Prince of Fritzlar	Elector of Hesse (Hesse-Cassel)
84. Prince of Salm-Salm	Prince of Salm-Salm	86. Prince of Salm-Salm (in Anholt & Bocholt)	Prince of Salm-Salm
85. Prince of Dietrichstein	Prince of Dietrichstein	87. Prince of Dietrichstein (in Neu-Ravensburg)	Prince of Dietrichstein
86. Prince of Nassau-Hadamar	Prince of Orange-Nassau	88. Prince of Nassau-Hadamar	Prince of Orange-Nassau
—		89. Prince of Zwiefalten	Elector of Württemberg
87. Prince of Nassau-Dillenburg	Prince of Orange-Nassau	90. Prince of Nassau-Dillenburg	Prince of Orange-Nassau
88. Prince of Auersperg	Prince of Auersperg	91. Prince of Auersperg	Prince of Auersperg
—		92. Prince of Starkenburg	Landgrave of Hesse (Hesse-Darmstadt)
89. Prince of East Frisia	King of Prussia	93. Prince of East Frisia	King of Prussia
90. Prince of Fürstenberg	Prince of Fürstenberg	94. Prince of Fürstenberg	Prince of Fürstenberg
91. Prince of Schwarzenberg	Prince of Schwarzenberg	95. Prince of Schwarzenberg	Prince of Schwarzenberg
—		96. Prince of Göttingen	King of Great Britain as Duke of Hanover
—		97. Prince of Mindelheim	Elector of Bavaria
92. Prince of Liechtenstein	Prince of Liechtenstein	98. Prince of Liechtenstein	Prince of Liechtenstein
93. Prince of Thurn and Taxis	Prince of Thurn and Taxis	99. Prince of Thurn and Taxis	Prince of Thurn and Taxis
94. Prince of Schwarzburg	Prince of Schwarzburg-Rudolstadt; Prince of Schwarzburg-Sondershausen	100. Prince of Schwarzburg	Prince of Schwarzburg-Rudolstadt; Prince of Schwarzburg-Sondershausen
—		101. Prince of Ortenau	Duke of Modena-Breisgau
—		102. Prince of Aschaffenburg	Arch-Chancellor Elector
—		103. Prince of Eichsfeld	King of Prussia
—		104. Prince of Brunswick-Blankenburg	Duke of Brunswick-Wolfenbüttel
—		105. Prince of Stargard	Duke of Mecklenburg-Strelitz
—		106. Prince of Erfurt	King of Prussia
—		107. Prince of Nassau-Usingen	Prince of Nassau-Usingen
—		108. Prince of Nassau-Weilburg	Prince of Nassau-Usingen
—		109. Prince of Hohenzollern-Sigmaringen	Prince of Hohenzollern-Sigmaringen
—		110. Prince of Salm-Kyrburg	Prince of Salm-Kyrburg
—		111. Landgrave of Baar	Prince of Fürstenberg
—		112. Landgrave of Klettgau	Prince of Schwarzenberg
—		113. Princely Count of Buchau	Prince of Thurn and Taxis
—		114. Prince of Waldeck and Pyrmont	Prince of Waldeck and Pyrmont
—		115. Prince of Löwenstein-Werthheim	Prince of Löwenstein-Wertheim-Rosenberg; Prince of Löwenstein-Wertheim-Freudenberg
—		116. Prince of Oettingen-Spielberg	Prince of Oettingen-Spielberg
—		117. Prince of Oettingen-Wallerstein	Prince of Oettingen-Wallerstein
—		118. Prince of Solms-Braunfels	Prince of Solms-Braunfels
—		119. Prince of Hohenlohe-Neuenstein	Prince of Hohenlohe-Neuenstein
—		120. Prince of Hohenlohe-Waldenburg-Schillingsfürst	Prince of Hohenlohe-Waldenburg-Schillingsfürst
—		121. Prince of Hohenlohe-Waldenburg-Bartenstein	Prince of Hohenlohe-Waldenburg-Bartenstein
—		122. Prince of Isenburg-Birstein	Prince of Isenburg-Birstein
—		123. Prince of Rietberg	Prince of Kaunitz-Rietberg
—		124. Prince of Reuss Elder Line	Prince of Reuss Elder Line (Reuss-Greiz)
—		125. Prince of Leiningen	Prince of Leiningen
—		126. Princely Count of Edelstetten	Prince of Ligne
—		127. Prince of Rheina-Wolbeck	Duke of Looz-Corswarem
95. Bench of Swabian Prelates (single vote)		Abolished	
96. Bench of Counts of Swabia (single vote)		128. Bench of Counts of Swabia (single vote)	
97. Bench of Rhenish Prelates (single vote)		Abolished	
98. Bench of Counts of the Wetterau (single vote)		129. Bench of Counts of the Wetterau (single vote)	
99. Bench of Counts of Franconia (single vote)		130. Bench of Counts of Franconia (single vote)	
100. Bench of Counts of Westphalia (single vote)		131. Bench of Counts of Westphalia (single vote)	

=== Bench of Counts of Swabia ===
1792	Owner 1792	1803	Owner 1803
1. Count of Heiligenberg and Werdenberg	Prince of Fürstenberg	1. Count of Heiligenberg and Werdenberg	Prince of Fürstenberg
2. Princely Abbess of Buchau	Princely Abbess of Buchau	2. Lord of Buchau	Prince of Thurn and Taxis (Princely County of Buchau raised to the College of Princes; Bad Buchau formed as a Lordship with a new vote in the Swabian Bench)
3. Bailiff of Alsace and Burgundy	Grandmaster of the Teutonic Order	3. Commander of Altshausen	Grandmaster of the Teutonic Order
4. Count of Oettingen	Princes of Oettingen-Spielberg and Oettingen-Wallerstein	Raised to the College of Princes	
5. Count of Montfort	Archduke of Austria	4. Count of Montfort	Archduke of Austria
6. Count of Helfenstein	Elector of Bavaria	5. Count of Helfenstein	Elector of Bavaria
7. Landgrave of Klettgau and Count of Sulz	Prince of Schwarzenberg	Raised to the College of Princes	
8. Count of Königsegg	Count of Königsegg-Aulendorf	6. Count of Königsegg	Count of Königsegg-Aulendorf
9. Archsteward of Waldburg	Archstewards of Waldburg-Wolfegg-Waldsee, Waldburg-Zeil-Trauchburg and Waldburg-Zeil-Wurzach	7. Archsteward of Waldburg	Archstewards of Waldburg-Wolfegg-Waldsee, Waldburg-Zeil-Trauchburg and Waldburg-Zeil-Wurzach
10. Count of Eberstein	Margrave of Baden	8. Count of Eberstein	Elector of Baden
11. Count of Hohengeroldseck	Count of Leyen	9. Count of Hohengeroldseck	Count of Leyen
12. Count of Fugger	Counts of Fugger-Babenhausen, Fugger-Glött, Fugger-Kirchberg-Weissenhorn, Fugger-Kirchheim and Fugger-Nordendorf	10. Count of Fugger	Prince of Fugger-Babenhausen; and the Counts of Fugger-Glött, Fugger-Kirchberg-Weissenhorn, Fugger-Kirchheim and Fugger-Nordendorf
13. Count of Hohenems	Archduke of Austria	11. Count of Hohenems	Archduke of Austria
14. Lord of Eglofs	Count of Abensberg and Traun	12. Lord of Eglofs	Count of Abensberg and Traun
15. Princely Count of Bonndorf	Princely Abbot of St Blaise	13. Princely Count of Bonndorf	Grandmaster of the Order of St John
16. Lord of Thannhausen	Counts of Stadion-Thannhausen and Stadion-Warthausen	14. Lord of Thannhausen	Counts of Stadion-Thannhausen and Stadion-Warthausen
17. Lord of Eglingen	Prince of Thurn and Taxis	15. Lord of Eglingen	Prince of Thurn and Taxis
18. Prince of Khevenhüller-Metsch	Prince of Khevenhüller-Metsch	16. Prince of Khevenhüller-Metsch	Prince of Khevenhüller-Metsch
19. Count of Kuefstein-Greillenstein	Count of Kuefstein-Greillenstein	17. Count of Kuefstein-Greillenstein	Count of Kuefstein-Greillenstein
20. Prince of Colloredo-Mansfeld	Prince of Colloredo-Mansfeld	18. Prince of Colloredo-Mansfeld	Prince of Colloredo-Mansfeld
21. Count of Harrach zu Rohrau	Count of Harrach zu Rohrau	19. Count of Harrach zu Rohrau	Count of Harrach zu Rohrau
22. Count of Sternberg-Manderscheid	Count of Sternberg-Manderscheid	20. Count of Sternberg-Manderscheid	Count of Sternberg-Manderscheid
23. Count of Neipperg	Count of Neipperg	21. Count of Neipperg	Count of Neipperg
24. Prince of Hohenzollern-Sigmaringen	Prince of Hohenzollern-Sigmaringen	Raised to the College of Princes	

=== Bench of Counts of the Wetterau ===
1792	Owner 1792	1803	Owner 1803
1. Prince of Nassau-Usingen	Prince of Nassau-Usingen	Raised to the College of Princes	
2. Prince of Nassau-Weilburg	Prince of Nassau-Weilburg	Raised to the College of Princes	
3. Prince of Nassau-Saarbrücken	Princes of Nassau-Usingen and Nassau-Weilburg	Abolished	
4. Prince of Solms-Braunfels	Prince of Solms-Braunfels	Raised to the College of Princes	
5. Count of Solms-Lich	Prince of Solms-Hohensolms-Lich	1. Count of Solms-Lich	Prince of Solms-Hohensolms-Lich
6. Count of Solms-Hohensolms	Prince of Solms-Hohensolms-Lich	2. Count of Solms-Hohensolms	Prince of Solms-Hohensolms-Lich
7. Count of Solms-Rödelheim	Count of Solms-Rödelheim-Assenheim	3. Count of Solms-Rödelheim	Count of Solms-Rödelheim-Assenheim
8. Count of Solms-Laubach	Count of Solms-Laubach	4. Count of Solms-Laubach	Count of Solms-Laubach
9. Prince of Isenburg-Birstein	Prince of Isenburg-Birstein	Raised to the College of Princes	
10. Count of Isenburg-Büdingen	Counts of Isenburg-Büdingen, Isenburg-Büdingen-Meerholz and Isenburg-Büdingen-Wächtersbach	5. Count of Isenburg-Büdingen	Counts of Isenburg-Büdingen, Isenburg-Büdingen-Meerholz and Isenburg-Büdingen-Wächtersbach
11. Prince of Stolberg-Gedern	Prince of Stolberg-Gedern	6. Prince of Stolberg-Gedern	Prince of Stolberg-Gedern
12. Count of Stolberg-Roßla	Count of Stolberg-Stolberg	7. Count of Stolberg-Roßla	Count of Stolberg-Stolberg
13. Count of Stolberg-Wernigerode	Count of Stolberg-Wernigerode	8. Count of Stolberg-Wernigerode	Count of Stolberg-Wernigerode
14. Count of Wittgenstein	Princes of Sayn-Wittgenstein-Berleburg and Sayn-Wittgenstein-Hohenstein	9. Count of Wittgenstein	Princes of Sayn-Wittgenstein-Berleburg and Sayn-Wittgenstein-Hohenstein
15. Count of Sayn	Count of Sayn-Wittgenstein-Sayn	10. Count of Sayn	Count of Sayn-Wittgenstein-Sayn
16. Wild- and Rhinegrave of Grumbach	Wild- and Rhinegrave of Salm-Grumbach	11. Count of Horstmar (1st vote)	Wild- and Rhinegrave of Salm-Horstmar
17. Wild- and Rhinegrave of Rheingrafenstein	Wild- and Rhinegrave of Salm-Grumbach	12. Count of Horstmar (2nd vote)	Wild- and Rhinegrave of Salm-Horstmar
18. Count of Leiningen-Hartenburg	Prince of Leiningen	Raised to the College of Princes	
19. Count of Leiningen-Heidesheim and -Guntersblum	Counts of Leiningen-Heidesheim and Leiningen-Guntersblum	13. Count of Leiningen-Neidenau and -Billigheim	Counts of Leiningen-Neidenau and Leiningen-Billigheim
20. Count of Leiningen-Westerburg-Altleiningen	Count of Leiningen-Westerburg-Altleiningen	14. Count of Ilbenstadt	Count of Leiningen-Westerburg-Altleiningen
21. Count of Leiningen-Westerburg-Neuleiningen	Count of Leiningen-Westerburg-Neuleiningen	15. Count of Engelthal	Count of Leiningen-Westerburg-Neuleiningen
22. Count of Reuss and Plauen	Princes of Reuss Elder Line and Reuss Younger Line	16. Count of Reuss and Plauen	Prince of Reuss Younger Line (Reuss Elder Line raised to the College of Princes)
23. Count of Schönburg	Princes of Schönburg-Hartenstein and Schönburg-Waldenburg; and the Counts of Schönburg-Hinterglauchau, Schönburg-Rochsburg and Schönburg-Wechselburg	17. Count of Schönburg	Princes of Schönburg-Hartenstein and Schönburg-Waldenburg; and the Counts of Schönburg-Hinterglauchau, Schönburg-Rochsburg and Schönburg-Wechselburg
24. Count of Ortenburg	Count of Ortenburg	18. Count of Ortenburg	Count of Ortenburg
25. Count of Kriechingen	Prince of Wied-Runkel	19. Prince of Wied-Runkel	Prince of Wied-Runkel

=== Bench of Counts of Franconia ===
1792	Owner 1792	1803	Owner 1803
1-6. Princes of Hohenlohe (6 votes)	Princes of Hohenlohe-Neuenstein, Hohenlohe-Neuenstein-Ingelfingen, Hohenlohe-Neuenstein-Kirchberg, Hohenlohe-Neuenstein-Langenburg, Hohenlohe-Waldenburg-Bartenstein, Hohenlohe-Waldenburg-Jagstberg, Hohenlohe-Waldenburg-Schillingsfürst and Hohenlohe-Waldenburg-Waldenburg	1-3. Princes of Hohenlohe (3 votes)	Princes of Hohenlohe-Neuenstein-Ingelfingen, Hohenlohe-Neuenstein-Kirchberg, Hohenlohe-Neuenstein-Langenburg, Hohenlohe-Waldenburg-Jagstberg and Hohenlohe-Waldenburg-Waldenburg (Other lines raised to the College of Princes)
7. Count of Castell	Counts of Castell-Castell and Castell-Rüdenhausen	4. Count of Castell	Counts of Castell-Castell and Castell-Rüdenhausen
8. Count of Erbach	Counts of Erbach-Erbach, Erbach-Fürstenau and Erbach-Schönberg	5. Count of Erbach	Counts of Erbach-Erbach, Erbach-Fürstenau and Erbach-Schönberg
9. Count of Wertheim	Counts of Löwenstein-Wertheim-Rochefort and Löwenstein-Wertheim-Virneburg	6. Count of Wertheim	Counts of Löwenstein-Wertheim-Freudenberg and Löwenstein-Wertheim-Rosenberg
10. Allodial heirs to the Lords of Limpurg	Dukes of Mecklenburg-Schwerin and Württemberg; Princes of Hohenlohe-Waldenburg-Bartenstein and Leiningen; Counts of Isenburg-Büdingen-Meerholz, Löwenstein-Wertheim-Rochefort, Löwenstein-Wertheim-Virneburg, Pückler and Limpurg, Rechteren-Limpurg, Salm-Grumbach, Schwarzburg-Rudolstadt and Solms-Rödelheim-Assenheim	7. Allodial heirs to the Lords of Limpurg	Elector of Württemberg; Duke of Mecklenburg-Schwerin; Princes of Hohenlohe-Waldenburg-Bartenstein and Leiningen; Counts of Isenburg-Büdingen-Meerholz, Löwenstein-Wertheim-Freudenberg, Löwenstein-Wertheim-Rosenberg, Pückler and Limpurg, Rechteren-Limpurg, Salm-Grumbach, Schwarzburg-Rudolstadt and Solms-Rödelheim-Assenheim
11. Count of Rieneck	Count of Nostitz-Rieneck	8. Count of Rieneck	Count of Nostitz-Rieneck
12. Baron of Seinsheim	Prince of Schwarzenberg	9. Baron of Seinsheim	Prince of Schwarzenberg
13. Allodial heirs to the Counts of Wolfstein	Prince of Hohenlohe-Neuenstein-Kirchberg; Count of Giech	10. Allodial heirs to the Counts of Wolfstein	Prince of Hohenlohe-Neuenstein-Kirchberg; Count of Giech
14. Lord of Reichelsberg	Counts of Schönborn-Buchheim and Schönborn-Wiesentheid	11. Lord of Reichelsberg	Counts of Schönborn-Buchheim and Schönborn-Wiesentheid
15. Lord of Wiesentheid	Counts of Hatzfeld and Schönborn-Wiesentheid	12. Lord of Wiesentheid	Counts of Hatzfeld and Schönborn-Wiesentheid
16. Count of Windisch-Grätz	Count of Windisch-Grätz	13. Count of Windisch-Grätz	Count of Windisch-Grätz
17. Prince of Orsini and Rosenberg	Prince of Orsini and Rosenberg	14. Prince of Orsini and Rosenberg	Prince of Orsini and Rosenberg
18. Prince of Starhemberg	Prince of Starhemberg	15. Prince of Starhemberg	Prince of Starhemberg
19. Count of Wurmbrand-Stuppach	Count of Wurmbrand-Stuppach	16. Count of Wurmbrand-Stuppach	Count of Wurmbrand-Stuppach
20. Count of Giech	Count of Giech	17. Count of Giech	Count of Giech
21. Count of Grävenitz	Count of Grävenitz	18. Count of Grävenitz	Count of Grävenitz
22. Count of Pückler	Count of Pückler and Limpurg	19. Count of Pückler	Count of Pückler and Limpurg

=== Bench of Counts of Westphalia ===
1792	Owner 1792	1803	Owner 1803
1. Count of Sayn-Altenkirchen	King of Prussia	1. Count of Sayn-Altenkirchen	Prince of Nassau-Usingen
2. Count of Sayn-Hachenburg	Prince of Nassau-Weilburg	2. Count of Sayn-Hachenburg	Prince of Nassau-Weilburg
3. Count of Tecklenburg	King of Prussia	3. Count of Tecklenburg	King of Prussia
4. Count of Upper Wied	Prince of Wied-Runkel	4. Count of Upper Wied	Prince of Wied-Runkel
5. Prince of Wied-Neuwied	Prince of Wied-Neuwied	5. Prince of Wied-Neuwied	Prince of Wied-Neuwied
6. Count of Schaumburg	Landgrave of Hesse-Cassel; Count of Schaumburg-Lippe	6. Count of Schaumburg	Elector of Hesse (Hesse-Cassel); Count of Schaumburg-Lippe
7. Count of Oldenburg	Duke of Oldenburg	7. Count of Oldenburg	Duke of Oldenburg
8. Count of Delmenhorst	Duke of Oldenburg	8. Count of Delmenhorst	Duke of Oldenburg
9. Prince of Lippe	Prince of Lippe	9. Prince of Lippe	Prince of Lippe
10. Count of Bentheim	King of Great Britain as Duke of Hanover	10. Count of Bentheim	Count of Bentheim and Steinfurt
11. Count of Steinfurt	Count of Bentheim-Steinfurt	11. Count of Steinfurt	Count of Bentheim and Steinfurt
12. Count of Hoya	King of Great Britain as Duke of Hanover	12. Count of Hoya	King of Great Britain as Duke of Hanover
12. Count of Diepholz	King of Great Britain as Duke of Hanover	12. Count of Diepholz	King of Great Britain as Duke of Hanover
12. Count of Spiegelberg	King of Great Britain as Duke of Hanover	12. Count of Spiegelberg	King of Great Britain as Duke of Hanover
13. Count of Virneburg	Counts of Löwenstein-Wertheim-Rochefort and Löwenstein-Wertheim-Virneburg	Raised to the College of Princes	
14. Count of Rietberg	Prince of Kaunitz-Rietberg	Raised to the College of Princes	
15. Prince of Waldeck and Pyrmont	Prince of Waldeck and Pyrmont	Raised to the College of Princes	
16. Lord of Pyrmont (Eifel)	Count of Waldbott von Bassenheim	13. Count of Heggback	Count of Waldbott von Bassenheim
17. Count of Gronsfeld	Count of Törring-Jettenbach	14. Count of Gutenzell	Count of Törring-Jettenbach
18. Count of Reckheim	Count of Aspremont-Lynden	15. Count of Baindt	Count of Aspremont-Lynden
19. Lord of Anholt	Prince of Salm-Salm	16. Lord of Anholt	Prince of Salm-Salm
20. Lord of Winneburg and Beilstein	Count of Metternich-Winneburg and Beilstein	17. Count of Ochsenhausen	Prince of Metternich-Winneburg and Beilstein
21. Count of Holzappel	Prince of Anhalt-Bernburg-Schaumburg-Hoym	18. Count of Holzappel	Prince of Anhalt-Bernburg-Schaumburg-Hoym
22. Count of Blankenheim and Gerolstein	Count of Sternberg-Manderscheid	19. Count of Schussenried and Weissenau	Count of Sternberg-Manderscheid
23. Lord of Wittem	Count of Plettenberg-Wittem	20. Lord of Mietingen and Sullmingen	Count of Plettenberg-Wittem
24. Lord of Gemen	Baron of Boyneburg-Bömelberg	21. Lord of Gemen	Baron of Boyneburg-Bömelberg
25. Count of Gimborn-Neustadt	Count of Wallmoden-Gimborn	22. Count of Gimborn-Neustadt	Count of Wallmoden-Gimborn
26. Lord of Wickrath	Count of Quadt-Wykradt	23. Count of Isny	Count of Quadt-Isny
27. Lord of Myllendonk	Count of Ostein	24. Count of Buxheim	Count of Ostein
28. Baron of Reichenstein	Count of Nesselrode-Reichenstein	25. Baron of Reichenstein	Count of Nesselrode-Reichenstein
29. Count of Schleiden	Duke of Arenberg	26. Count of Vest Recklinghausen and Meppen	Duke of Arenberg
30. Count of Kerpen and Lommersum	Count of Schaesberg-Retersbeck	27. Count of Tannheim	Count of Schaesberg-Tannheim
31. Lord of Dyck	Count of Salm-Reifferscheid-Dyck	28. Lord of Dyck	Count of Salm-Reifferscheid-Dyck
32. Lord of Saffenburg	Duke of Arenberg	29. Lord of Saffenburg	Duke of Arenberg
33. Count of Hallermund	Count of Platen-Hallermund	30. Count of Hallermund	Count of Platen-Hallermund
34. Burgrave of Rheineck	Prince of Sinzendorf	31. Count of Winterrieden	Prince of Sinzendorf
35. Count of Bretzenheim	Prince of Heydeck-Bretzenheim	32. Prince of Lindau	Prince of Heydeck-Bretzenheim
36. Count of Wartenburg	Count of Wartenburg	33. Count of Roth	Count of Wartenburg-Roth

== College of Cities ==
1792	Owner 1792	1803	Owner 1803
1. Free City of Lübeck	Free City of Lübeck	1. Free City of Lübeck	Free City of Lübeck
2. Free City of Frankfurt am Main	Free City of Frankfurt am Main	2. Free City of Frankfurt am Main	Free City of Frankfurt am Main
3. Free City of Bremen	Free City of Bremen	3. Free City of Bremen	Free City of Bremen
4. Free City of Hamburg	Free City of Hamburg	4. Free City of Hamburg	Free City of Hamburg
5. Free City of Augsburg	Free City of Augsburg	5. Free City of Augsburg	Free City of Augsburg
6. Free City of Nuremberg	Free City of Nuremberg	6. Free City of Nuremberg	Free City of Nuremberg
—		All other free cities abolished; votes transferred to new owners within the Princes' college and the four comital benches	
