= Lordship of Myllendonk =

German polity

Coordinates: 51°12′34″N 6°29′25″E

Lordship of Myllendonk Herrschaft Myllendonk (German)
- 1166–1794
- Coat of arms

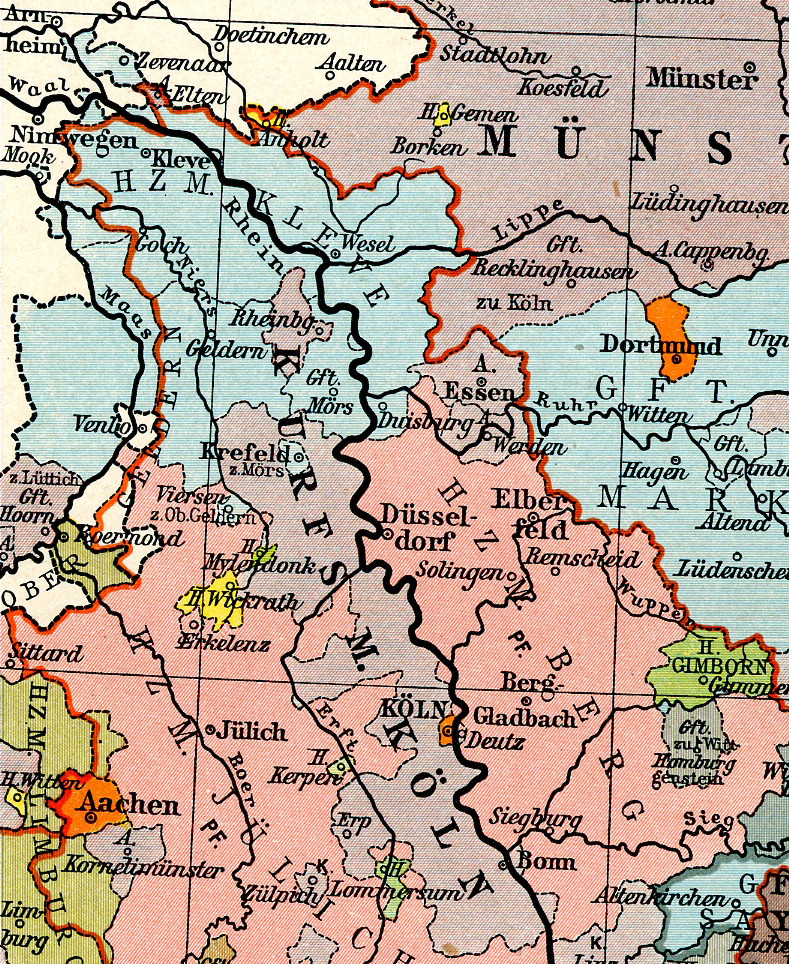
- Myllendonk is shown in green to the left of the centre, north-east of the yellow Lordship of Wickrath.
- Status: State of the Holy Roman Empire
- Religion: Roman Catholicism
- Government: Feudal Lordship
- Lord of Myllendonk
- History
  - Lord first mentioned: 1166
  - Gained imperial immediacy: 1700
  - Conquered by France: 1794
| Succeeded by |
| French First Republic |
- Today part of: North Rhine-Westphalia

The Lordship of Myllendonk (sometimes spelled "Millendonk") was an estate of the Holy Roman Empire, located in western North Rhine-Westphalia, Germany. It was bordered by the Duchy of Jülich to the west and north, the Lordship of Dyck to the south, and the Archbishopric of Cologne to the east and southeast. The lordship contained Korschenbroich and the Castle of Myllendonk. From 1700, Myllendonk was an Imperial Estate with a vote in the Bench of Counts of Westphalia.

== History ==
The Lords of Myllendonk are first mentioned in 1166 as belonging to one of the most important lines in the Lower Rhine. The Dukes of Guelders gained overlordship of the territory in 1268, and overlordship passed to the Archbishopric of Cologne in 1279. The line was annexed to the Pesch Myllendonk family in 1263, and in c. 1350 passed to the House of Mirlaer which renamed itself to Myllendonk-Mirlaer. Myllendonk was eventually inherited by Johann Jakob, Count of Bronckhorst and Anholt, the Dukes of Croÿ in 1682, the Countess of Berlepsch in 1694, and through the female inheritance to the Counts of Ostein in 1700. Myllendonk was also raised to the Bench of Counts of Westphalia in 1700 as an immediate Imperial Estate.

The Counts of Ostein ruled Myllendonk until 1794 when the French conquered the German territory on the western side of the Rhine River. The Counts of Ostein were compensated with the secularised Abbacy of Buchau in 1803. Myllendonk itself remained French until the Congress of Vienna awarded the territory to Prussia in 1814. The following year the Lordship was abolished and the territory was annexed into the newly created Province of Rhineland.
