= Salm-Reifferscheid-Hainsbach =

German statelet

County of Salm-Reifferscheid-Hainsbach Grafschaft Salm-Reifferscheid-Hainsbach
- 1734–1811
- Coat of arms
- Status: State of the Holy Roman Empire (until 1806)
- Capital: Hainsbach
- Government: Principality
- Historical era: Middle Ages
  - Partitioned from Salm-Reifferscheid-Bedburg: 1639 1734
  - Mediatised: 1811
Preceded by
Salm-Reifferscheid-Bedburg

Salm-Reifferscheid-Hainsbach was a German statelet, which was a partition of Salm-Reifferscheid-Bedbur.

From 1734 - 1811, Salm-Reifferscheid-Hainsbach was mediatised to Prussia and the branch became extinct in 1897.

== Counts of Salm-Reifferscheid-Hainsbach (1734–1811) ==
- Leopold Anthony (1734–1760)
- Francis Wenceslaus (1760–1811)
