= Prince-Bishopric of Regensburg =

Prince-Bishopric of Regensburg Fürstbistum/Hochstift Regensburg (German)
- 13th century–1803
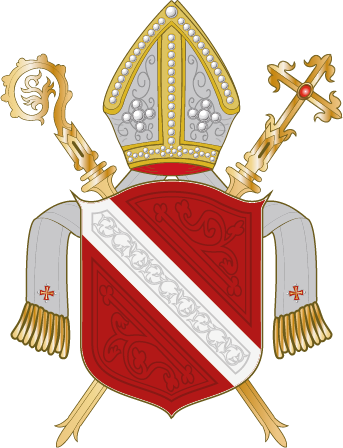
- Flag Coat of arms
- Status: Prince-Bishopric
- Capital: Regensburg Cathedral
- Government: Elective principality
- Historical era: Middle Ages
  - Founded by St Boniface: 739
  - Gained Reichsfreiheit: 13th century
  - Regensburg Reichsfrei as Imperial City: 1245
  - City annexed to Bavaria: 1486–1496
  - City adopted Reformation: 1542
  - City made permanent seat of Reichstag: 1663–1806
  - Mediatised to new Archbishopric¹: 1803
  - Ceded to Bavaria on Imperial collapse: January 6, 1806
Preceded by	Succeeded by
Duchy of Bavaria	Principality of Regensburg
- 1: The Bishopric, the Imperial City and all three Imperial Abbeys were mediatised simultaneously.

The Prince-Bishopric of Regensburg (German: Fürstbistum Regensburg; Hochstift Regensburg) was a small ecclesiastical principality of the Holy Roman Empire located near the Free Imperial City of Regensburg in Bavaria. It was elevated to the Archbishopric of Regensburg in 1803 after the dissolution of the Archbishopric of Mainz. The Prince-Bishopric of Regensburg must not be confused with the Diocese of Regensburg, which was considerably larger.

== History ==
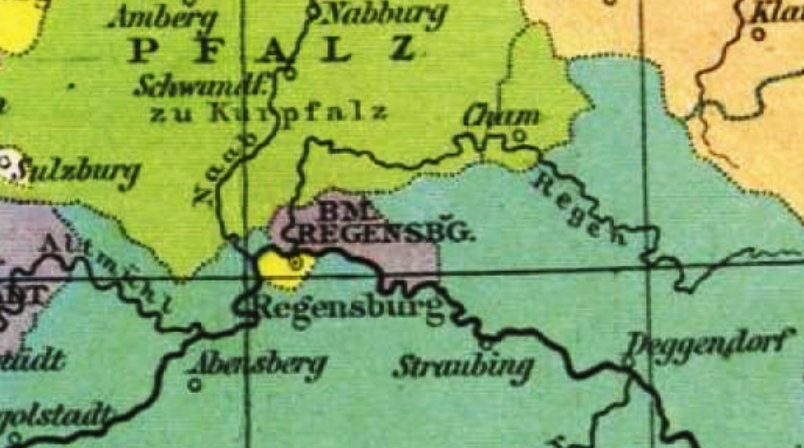
The Prince-Bishopric (purple) in the 18th century

The diocese was founded in 739 by Saint Boniface; it was originally subordinate to the archbishop of Salzburg. In the 13th century, the bishop of Regensburg became a prince of the Holy Roman Empire with a seat and vote at the Imperial Diet. As an enclave of the Duchy of Bavaria, the prince-bishopric was not able to expand territorially and remained one of the smallest of the Empire.

In the course of the German mediatization of 1803, the prince-bishopric was united with the Free Imperial city of Regensburg and other territories to form the Principality of Regensburg. Karl Theodor Anton Maria von Dalberg was the first prince-archbishop. In 1810, the principality became part of the Kingdom of Bavaria, although it retained archiepiscopal status. This followed the fall of the Holy Roman Empire in 1806 during the War of the Third Coalition.

The Bavarian Concordat of 1817 following Dalberg's death downgraded the Archdiocese of Regensburg into a suffragan diocese subordinate to the archbishop of Munich and Freising.

== Famous prince-bishops ==
- Saint Wolfgang (972–994)
- Saint Albertus Magnus (1260–1262)
- Joseph Clemens of Bavaria (1685–1716)
- Clemens August of Bavaria (1716–1719)

== See also ==
- Diocese of Regensburg
