= Bench of Counts of Westphalia =

The Bench of Counts of Westphalia, a historical title of nobility, was one of the four comital benches of the Reichstag in the Holy Roman Empire. Collectively, the Counts exercised one vote. Territories which belonged to the Bench before 1582 (the date from which admission to the Reichstag was administered by strict rules) are known as "Old Counts," and those added afterwards are known as "New Counts," in a manner exercised similarly by the College of Princes. A state could have the right to vote in the bench if they ruled an Imperial Estate with a right to vote in the Bench, or if they ruled a significant immediate territory which a right to vote in the Bench.

== List of Estates of Old Counts of Westphalia ==
- Duchy of Holstein-Gottorp-Oldenburg
- Lordship of Bretzenheim
- County of Rheineck
- County of Virneburg
- Lordship of Winneburg and Beilstein
- County of Moers (ext. 1702)
- County of Saarwerden and Lahr (ext. 1527)
- County of Oberstein (ext. 1682)
- County of Neuenahr (ext. 1600)
- County of Hoorn (ext. 1586)
- County of Sayn (ext. 1636)
- County of Sayn-Altenkirchen (1636)*
- County of Sayn-Hachenburg (1636)*
- Lordship of Plesse (ext. 1571)
- County of Wied and Runkel
- County of Wied-Neuwied (1698)*
- County of Frisia (ext. 1572)
- County of Lippe
- County of Hoya
- Principality of Waldeck (College of Princes: 1686–1692; ext. 1705)
- County of Diepholz
- County of Steinfurt
- County of Bentheim (ext. 1752)
- County of Bronchhorst (ext. 1719)
- County of Spiegelberg (1752)
- County of Tecklenburg
- County of Schaumburg and Gemen (ext. 1640)
- County of Schaumburg (1640)*
- Lordship of Gemen (1640)*
- Lordship of Wunstorf (ext. 1533)
- Lordship of Rietberg
- County of Bergen (ext. 1581)
- Principality of Salm (College of Princes: 1654)
- County of Manderscheid (ext. 1546)
- County of Kall (ext. 1752)
- Lordship of Blankenheim and Gerolstein
- County of Egmont and Iselstein (ext. 1548 (1707))
- County of Bergen and Walen (ext. 1567)
- County of Pyrmont
- Lordship of Saffenburg

* territory was created out of a prior state, therefore is not a New Count

== List of Estates of New Counts of Westphalia ==
- County of Reckheim (1623)
- Lordship of Gimborn-Neustadt (1631)
- County of Holzapfel (1641)
- Lordship of Anholt (1653)
- County of Bergen (1654, ext. 1712)
- Lordship of Reichenstein (1698)
- County of Hallermund (1707)
- Lordship of Wittem (1707)
- County of Schleiden (17..)
- Lordship of Kerpen-Lommersun (1712)
- County of Gronsfeld (1719)
- Lordship of Dyck (17..)
- Lordship of Wickrath (Wykradt) (1752)
- Lordship of Myllendonk (1752)
- County of Pyrmont (Pirmont) (1788)
- Lordship of Krautheim (1803)
