= Reichsdeputationshauptschluss =

1803 resolution of the Imperial Diet of the Holy Roman Empire

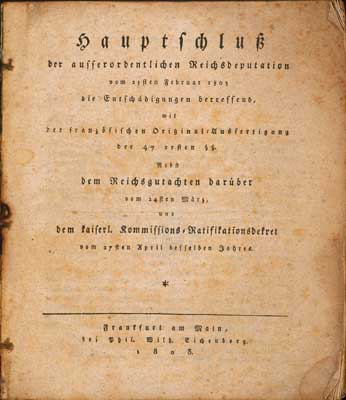
Reichsdeputationshauptschluss, printed edition, page 1

The Reichsdeputationshauptschluss (formally the Hauptschluss der außerordentlichen Reichsdeputation, or "Principal Conclusion of the Extraordinary Imperial Delegation"), sometimes referred to in English as the Final Recess or the Imperial Recess of 1803, was a resolution passed by the Reichstag (Imperial Diet) of the Holy Roman Empire on 24 February 1803. It was ratified by the Emperor Francis II and became law on 27 April. It proved to be the last significant law enacted by the Empire before its dissolution in 1806.

The resolution was approved by an Imperial Delegation (Reichsdeputation) on 25 February and submitted to the Reichstag for acceptance. It was based on a plan agreed in June 1802 between France and Russia, and broad principles outlined in the Treaty of Lunéville of 1801. The law secularized nearly 70 ecclesiastical states and abolished 45 imperial cities to compensate numerous German princes for territories to the west of the Rhine that had been annexed by France as a result of the French Revolutionary Wars.

== Secularization and mediatization ==
The secularized ecclesiastical states (prince-bishoprics, prince-priories, prince-abbeys and imperial abbeys) were generally annexed to neighbouring secular principalities, with several of the abbeys being given as secular fiefs to those small princes who had lost their estates west of the Rhine. Only three states retained their ecclesiastical character: the Archbishopric of Regensburg, which was raised from a bishopric with the incorporation of part of the Archbishopric of Mainz, and the lands of the Teutonic Knights and Knights of Saint John. Also of note is the former Prince-Archbishopric of Salzburg, which was secularized as a duchy with an increased territorial scope, and was also made an electorate.

In addition, all but a handful of the 51 imperial cities were abolished and annexed to neighboring states.

The Reichsdeputationshauptschluss was ratified unanimously by the Reichstag in March 1803, and was approved by the emperor, Francis II, the following month. However the emperor made a formal reservation in respect of the reallocation of votes within the Reichstag, as the balance between Protestant and Catholic states had been shifted heavily in the former's favour.

== Consequences ==
Following the Reichsdeputationshauptschluss, altogether 112 imperial estates, totaling 10,000 km^{2} (3,900 sq mi) in area, and a population of over three million people changed hands. A few states made significant territorial gains (most notably Baden, Württemberg, Bavaria, Saxony and Prussia), and Baden, Hesse-Kassel, and Württemberg gained status by being made electorates (to replace three that had been lost in the changes). Of the imperial cities, only Augsburg, Bremen, Frankfurt am Main, Hamburg, Lübeck, and Nuremberg survived as independent entities. The Transrhenanische Sustentationskommission was set up by the Imperial Diet to arrange the compensation of those princes whose territories had been ceded to France. It continued to operate down to at least 1820 (after the Empire's demise) and its archives are today kept in the German Federal Archives.

The principle that allies of Napoleon could expect to make gains in both territory and status was also established, and was to be repeated on a number of occasions, above all in 1806 when, at the time of the establishment of the Confederation of the Rhine, over 80 small and mid-size secular states (such as principalities and imperial counties) were mediatized and annexed to some of the member states of the new Confederation. These massive territorial and institutional upheavals were to bring about the dissolution of the Empire in the course of the same year.
