= Principality of Regensburg =

Former country

Coordinates: 49°1′N 12°5′E

Principality of Regensburg Fürstentum Regensburg (German)
- 1803–1810
- Flag Coat of arms

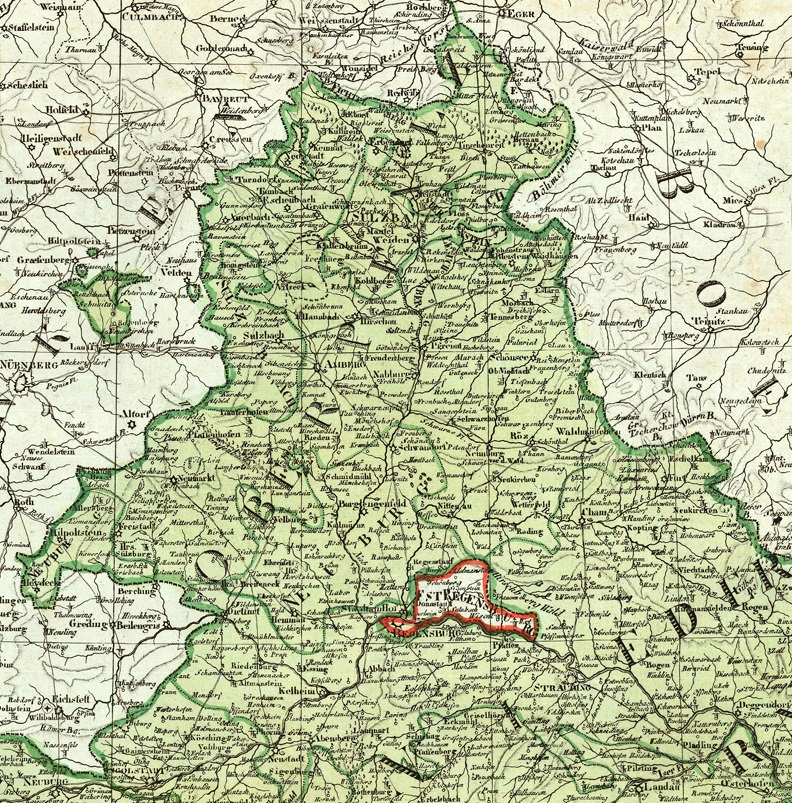
- 1807 map showing the Principality of Regensburg enclaved within Bavaria
- Capital: Regensburg
- Government: Ecclesiastical principality
- Prince-Archbishop
- Historical era: Napoleonic Wars
  - Created from all five Reichsfrei territories in Regensburg: 27 April 1803
  - Ceded to Bavaria: 6 January 1810
  - Formally incorporated into Bavaria: 22 May 1810
Preceded by
Imperial City of Regensburg
Prince-Bishopric of Regensburg
Saint Emmeram's Abbey
Niedermünster, Regensburg
Obermünster, Regensburg
Succeeded by
Kingdom of Bavaria

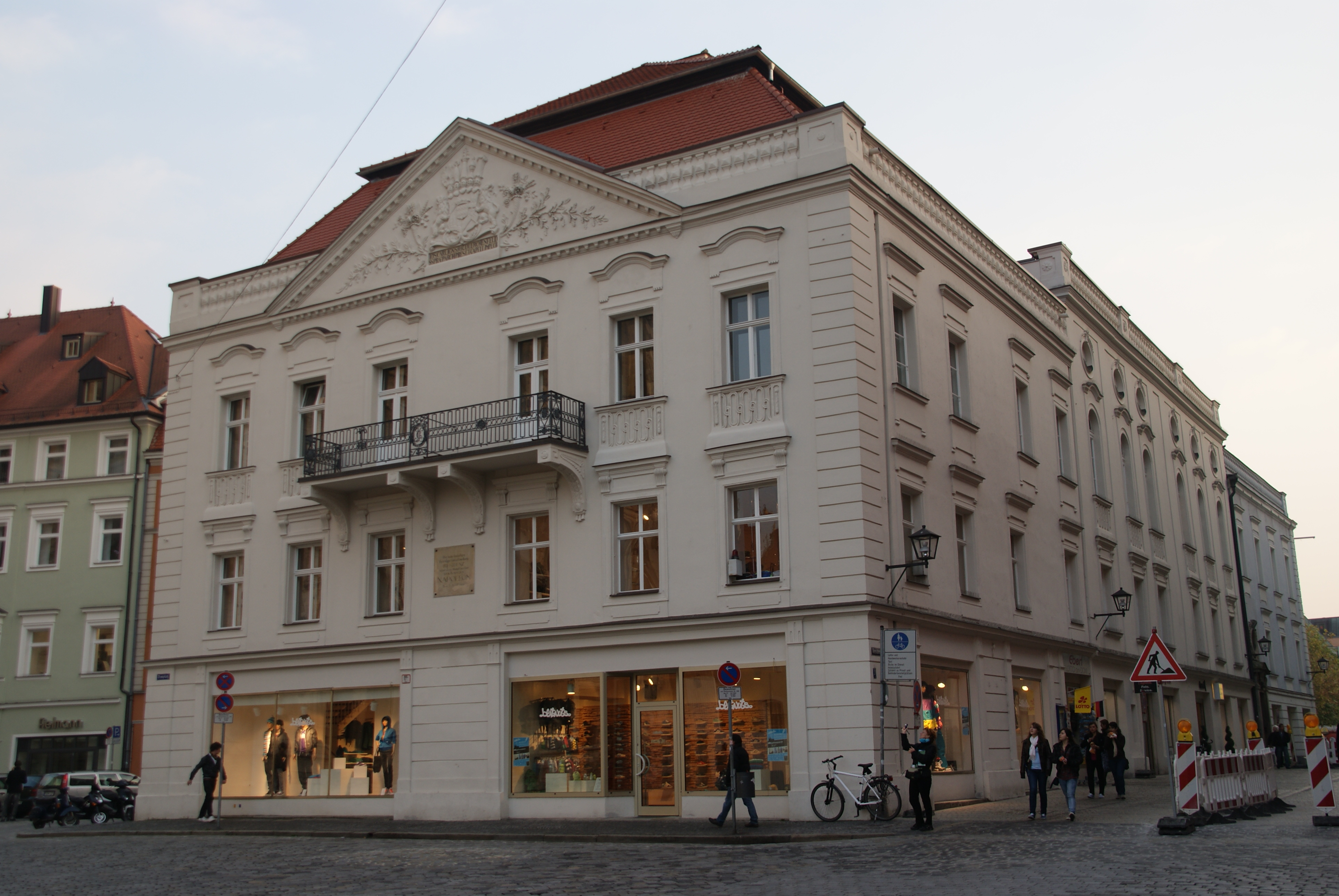
Residence of the Prince-Primate von Dalberg in Regensburg

The Principality of Regensburg (German: Fürstentum Regensburg) was a principality of the Holy Roman Empire that was created in 1803. Its capital was Regensburg. Following the dissolution of the Empire in 1806, the principality became a member state of the Confederation of the Rhine until 1810.

== History ==
The principality was initially created as an ecclesiastical electorate for Archbishop Karl Theodor von Dalberg, the Elector-Archchancellor of the Empire and the former Archbishop of Mainz, due to the annexation of Mainz itself by the French following the Treaty of Lunéville. Most of the new principality consisted of the territory of the former Prince-Bishopric of Regensburg. The principality also included the Lordships of Donaustauf, Wörth, and Hohenburg, the former free imperial city of Regensburg, St. Emmeram's Abbey, and the abbeys Obermünster and Niedermünster located within the city of Regensburg. Dalberg also acquired the newly created Principality of Aschaffenburg along the Main river.

Dalberg received the electoral dignity previously accorded to the Electorate of Mainz; his new principality has thus been known in German as Kurfürstentum Regensburg ("Electorate of Regensburg"). Because the archiepiscopal status of Mainz had also been transferred to the Regensburg diocese, the principality has also been known in English as the Archbishopric of Regensburg.

Because of Bavarian claims on Regensburg, Dalberg was not installed as archbishop until 1 February 1805. The principality lost its status as an electorate in 1806 with the dissolution of the Holy Roman Empire and became part of the Confederation of the Rhine later that year. The Napoleonic Code was introduced in 1809.

During the War of the Fifth Coalition, Austrian troops occupied Regensburg on 20 April 1809; it was shelled and stormed by French troops three days later. In the Treaty of Paris, Dalberg conceded Regensburg to the Kingdom of Bavaria, which formally incorporated the city on 22 May 1810. In return for conceding Regensburg, Dalberg was granted Hanau and Fulda, which he combined with the Principality of Aschaffenburg to create the Grand Duchy of Frankfurt. Although he had lost the Principality of Regensburg, Dalberg retained the title of Archbishop of Regensburg until his death in 1817, after which time the archbishopric was downgraded to a suffragan diocese of Munich and Freising after the Bavarian Concordat.

== Sources ==
- Köbler, Gerhard (1988). Historisches Lexikon der deutschen Länder (in German). Munich: Verlag C. H. Beck. p. 639. ISBN 3-406-33290-0.
