= Lordship of Wickrath =

Coordinates: 51°08′02″N 6°24′41″E

The arms of the Lords of Broichhausen who ruled Wickrath until 1488.

The arms of the Knights of Hompesch, who ruled Wickrath in 1488-1502.

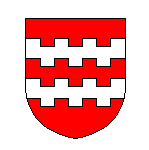
The arms of the Quadt-Wickrath, who ruled Wickrath in 1502-1794.

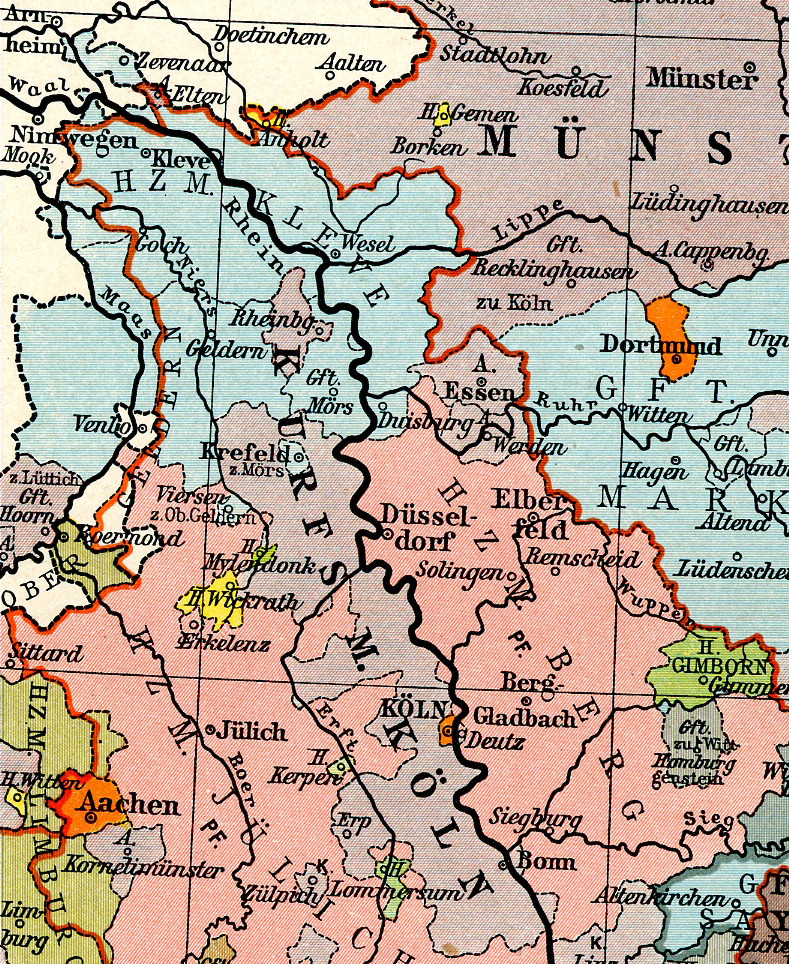
The Herrschaft of Wickrath is shown in yellow, to the left of the centre.

The Lordship of Wickrath (sometimes spelled "Wykradt") was a lordship of the Holy Roman Empire located in western North Rhine-Westphalia around the castle of Wickrath. The lordship was bordered by the Duchy of Jülich to the south, west and north, and the Archbishopric of Cologne to the east. Wickrath became an immediate lordship in 1488 after it passed to the Knights of Hompesch. It was located in the Lower Rhenish-Westphalian Circle, and from 1752 it was an Imperial Estate with a vote in the Bench of Counts of Westphalia.

== History ==
The first mention of Wickrath occurred in 971 where it was called "Wickenrodero Marca". Wickrath received its first church in 1200. It was ruled by the Lords of Broichhausen. In 1488 the Lordship of Wickrath was raised to an immediate lordship and was given to the Knights of Hompesch. It came to the Lords (later raised to Counts) of Quadt which renamed to Quadt-Wykradt in 1502. They were raised to an immediate state with a vote in the Bench of Counts of Westphalia in 1752. Wickrath, along with all German territory west of the Rhine River, was annexed to France in 1794 and the Counts of Quadt (later Princes, 1901) were later remunerated for their loss by gaining the City of Isny in modern Baden-Württemberg in 1803. The Congress of Vienna awarded Wickrath to the Kingdom of Prussia in 1814.
