= Febronianism =

18th-century movement within the Roman Catholic Church in Germany

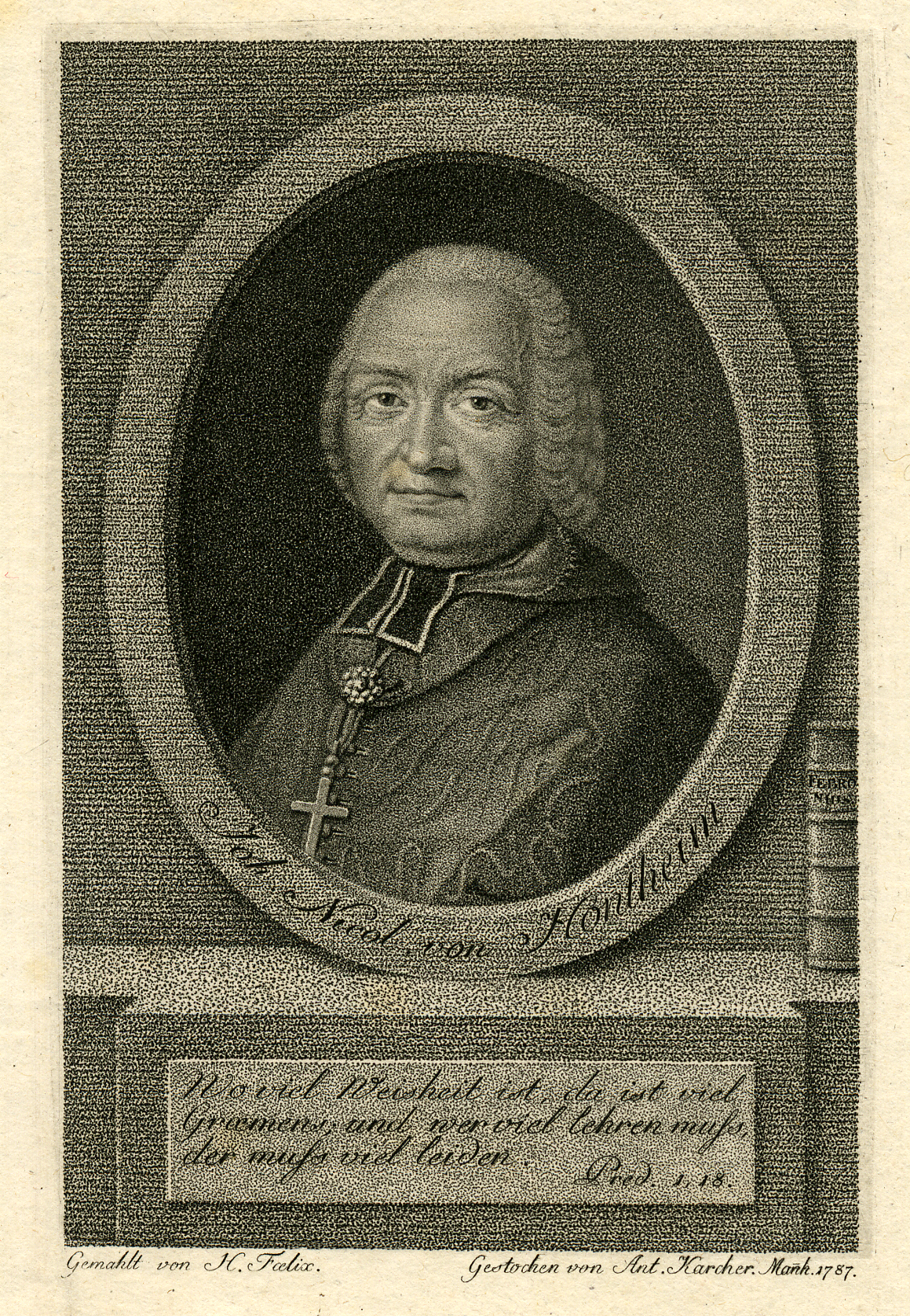
Johann Nikolaus von Hontheim, who used the pseudonym "Febronius", after which Febronianism is named

Febronianism was a powerful movement within the Catholic Church in Germany, in the latter part of the 18th century, directed towards nationalising Catholicism, restricting the power of the papacy in favour of the episcopate, and reunion of dissident churches with the Catholic Church. Its thrust broadly corresponded to that of Gallicanism in France. Friedrich Lauchert describes Febronianism, in the Catholic Encyclopedia, as a politico-ecclesiastical system, ostensibly purposed to facilitate reconciliation of Protestant entities with the Catholic Church by curbing the Holy See's power.

== Origin of name ==
The name is derived from the pseudonym Justinus Febronius adopted by Johann Nikolaus von Hontheim, coadjutor bishop of Trier, in publishing his book De statu ecclesiae et legitima potestae Romani pontificis. (Note: Justinus Febronius (pseud.) [Hontheim, Johann Nikolaus von] (1766) [First published 1763]. De statu Ecclesiae et legitima potestate Romani Pontificis liber singularis; ad reuniendos dissidentes in religione christianos compositus (in Latin). Bullioni: Evrardus. OCLC 15742817. Cited in Phillips 1911. Phillips notes that second and enlarged edition has new prefaces addressed to Pope Clement XIII, to Christian kings and princes, to the bishops of the Catholic Church, and to doctors of theology and canon law; three additional volumes, published in 1770, 1772 and 1774 in Frankfort, are devoted to vindications of the original work against the critics.) Using Gallican principles imbibed from the canonist Zeger Bernhard van Espen at the University of Louvain, Hontheim moved to a radicalism far outstripping traditional Gallicanism. His theory of ecclesiastical organisation aimed to negate within the Catholic Church the unique authority vested in the bishop of Rome's administration. In 1738 Hontheim went to Koblenz, as an official to the Archbishop-Elector of Trier. Archbishops of Trier were simultaneously princes and prince-electors of the Holy Roman Empire. According to Walter Alison Phillips, writing in the Encyclopædia Britannica, he thereby had ample opportunity to observe how the internal affairs of the Holy Roman Empire were subject to the Roman Curia's meddling. This, most notably, was in negotiations preceding the elections, at which Hontheim assisted, of Holy Roman Emperors Charles VII and Francis I. On these two occasions, it appears, what had prompted his critically reviewing papal pretensions was the Papal Nuncio; his extreme claims and interference in matters before the Holy Roman Empire's electoral college. Hontheim published the results under his pseudonym. The book aroused considerable excitement and controversy at the time.

== Overview ==
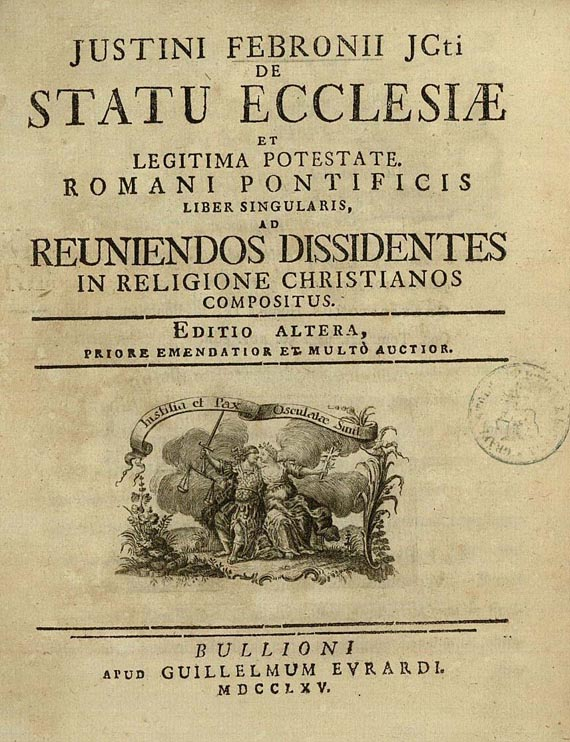
Febronius' treatise De Statu Ecclesiae

The main propositions defended by Febronius were as follows. The constitution of the Church is not, by Christ's institution, monarchical, and the pope, though entitled to a certain primacy, is subordinate to the universal Church. Though as the "centre of unity" he may be regarded as the guardian and champion of the ecclesiastical law, and though he may propose laws, and send legates on the affairs of his primacy, his sovereignty (principatus) over the Church is not one of jurisdiction, but of order and collaboration (ordinis et consociationis). The Roman (ultramontane) doctrine of papal infallibility is not accepted by the other Catholic Churches and, moreover, has no practical utility. The Church is based on the one episcopacy common to all bishops, the pope being only first among equals.

It follows that the pope is subject to general councils, in which the bishops are his colleagues (conjudices), not merely his consultors; nor has he the exclusive right to summon such councils. The decrees of general councils need not be confirmed by the pope nor can they be altered by him; on the other hand, appeal may be made from papal decisions to a general council. As for the rights of the popes in such matters as appeals, reservations, the confirmation, translation and deposition of bishops, these belong properly to the bishops in provincial synods, and were usurped by the papacy gradually as the result of a variety of causes, notably of the Pseudo-Isidorian Decretals. The Pseudo-Isidorean Decretals, also known as the False Decretals, are a set of false documents included in a collection of canon law, some concerning the relations of the political and ecclesiastical powers, composed about the middle of the ninth century by an author who used the pseudonym Isidore Mercator. Louis Saltet, in the Catholic Encyclopedia, wrote that the forgeries bear some of the blame for the distorted view of ecclesiastical antiquity in the Middle Ages, and they blurred the whole historical perspective.

For the health of the Church it is therefore necessary to restore matters to their condition before the Pseudo-Isidorian Decretals, and to give to the episcopate its due authority. The main obstacle to this is not the pope himself, but the Curia, and this must be fought by all possible means, especially by thorough popular education (primum adversus abususn ecclesiasticae potestatis remedium), and by the assembling of national and provincial synods, the neglect of which is the main cause of the Church's woes. If the pope will not move in the matter, the princes, and notably the emperor, must act in co-operation with the bishops, summon national councils even against the popes will, defy his excommunication, and in the last resort refuse obedience in those matters over which the papacy has usurped jurisdiction.

== Reception of Febronianism ==
The views of Febronius were not original. In the main they were those that predominated in the Council of Constance and the Council of Basel in the 15th century; but they were backed by Hontheim with such a wealth of learning, and they fit so well into the intellectual and political conditions of the time, that they found a widespread acceptance. The identity of Febronius was known in Rome almost as soon as it was published; but it was some years later, in 1778, that Hontheim was called to retract. Meanwhile, no steps were taken against Hontheim personally, who was well known in Rome.

Lauchert wrote that in three later volumes Hontheim defended his book, as Febronius and various other pseudonyms, against a series of attacks. In addition to Judicium academicum from the University of Cologne (1765), refutations appeared from a large number of Catholic authors, Lauchert lists titles by Pietro Ballerini, Tommaso Maria Mamachi, and Francesco Antonio Zaccaria. There were also refutations written from a Protestant standpoint, to repudiate the idea that a diminution of papal power was all that was necessary to bring the Protestants back into union with the Catholic Church, for instance Lauchert lists titles by Karl Friedrich Bahrdt, Johann Friedrich Bahrdt, and Karl Gottlob Hofmann.

The book was formally condemned, 27 February 1764, by Pope Clement XIII. By a 21 May 1764 brief, Pope Clement XIII commanded all the bishops of Germany to suppress the book. The papal condemnation met with a very mixed reception; in some dioceses the order to prohibit the book was ignored, in others action upon it was postponed pending an independent examination, in yet others (nine or ten prelates, among them the Elector of Trier) it was at once obeyed for political reasons, though even in these the forbidden book became the breviary of the governments. Lauchert wrote that despite the ban, the book, harmonizing as it did with the spirit of the times, was a tremendous success and was reprinted in German, French, Italian, Spanish, and Portuguese.

The first measures against Hontheim were taken by Pope Pius VI, who urged Prince Clemens Wenceslaus of Saxony, Elector of Trier, to induce Hontheim to recall the book; Wenceslaus threatened to deprive not only Hontheim but all his relatives of their offices. His initial recantation was rejected by the Holy See. Hontheim, after prolonged effort, much wavering and correspondence, signed a recantation; Wenceslaus forwarded Hontheim's corrected and revised, 15 November 1778, recantation to the Holy See. Lauchert wrote Hontheim's recantation was not sincere as evident from his subsequent actions; his Commentarius in Suam Retractationem Pio VI. Pont. Max. Kalendis Nov. anni 1778 submissam, written to justify his recantation to the public, shows Hontheim had not relinquished his ideas. (Note: Justinus Febronius (pseud.) [Hontheim, Johann Nikolaus von] (1781). Commentarius in Suam Retractationem Pio VI. Pont. Max. Kalendis Nov. anni 1778 submissam (in Latin). Frankfort. Cited in Lauchert (1909). Catholic Encyclopedia.) This book was purported to be a proof that his submission had been made of his own free will; it carefully avoided all the most burning questions, rather tended to show — as his correspondence proves — that Hontheim had not essentially shifted his standpoint; but Rome, from that time forward, left him in peace and removal of the censure followed that year.

The Febronian doctrine, in fact, exactly fitted the views of the German bishops, which were by no means disinterested. The German bishops were at this time great secular princes rather than Catholic prelates; with rare exceptions, they made no pretense of carrying out their spiritual duties; they shared to the full in the somewhat shallow Enlightenment of the age. As princes of the Empire they had asserted their practical independence of the emperor; they were irked by what they considered the unjustifiable interference of the Curia with their sovereign prerogatives, and wished to establish their independence of the pope also. In the ranks of the hierarchy, then, selfish motives combined with others more respectable to secure the acceptance of the Febronian position.

Among secular rulers the welcome given to it was even less equivocal. Even so devout a sovereign as Maria Theresa of Austria refused to allow Febronius to be forbidden in the Habsburg dominions; her son, Joseph II, Holy Roman Emperor, applied the Febronian principles with remorseless thoroughness. In Venice, in Tuscany, in Naples, in Portugal, they inspired the vigorous efforts of enlightened despots to reform the Church from above; and they gave a fresh impetus to the movement against the Jesuits, which, under pressure of the secular governments, culminated in the Suppression of the Society of Jesus by Pope Clement XIV in 1773.

According to Lauchert, the first attempt to give Febronian principles a practical application was made in Germany at the Koblenz Conference of 1769, where the three ecclesiastic prince-electors (Emmerich Joseph von Breidbach zu Bürresheim, Clemens Wenceslaus of Saxony, Maximilian Friedrich von Königsegg-Rothenfels), through their delegates, and under the directions of Hontheim, compiled a list of thirty grievances against the Curia, in consonance with the principles of the "Febronius"; (Note: le Bret, Johann F, ed. (1783). "Gravamina trium Archiepiscoporum-Electorum, Moguntinensis, Trevirensis et Coloniensis contra Curiam Apostolicam anno 1769. ad Cæsarem delata". Magazin zum Gebrauch der Staaten und Kirchengeschichte, Vornehmlich des Staatsrechts Catholoscher Regenten in Ansehung Ihrer Geistlichkeit (in Latin) (8). Ulm: auf Kosten der Stettinischen Buchhandlung: 1–21. OCLC 225242437. Cited in Lauchert (1909). Catholic Encyclopedia.) and after submitting them to Joseph II, had forwarded them to the new pope, Clement XIV. These articles, though Febronius was prohibited in the archdioceses, were wholly Febronian in tone; and, indeed, Hontheim himself took an active part in the diplomatic negotiations which were their outcome.

An attempt was made to realize the principles of the "Febronius" on a large scale in Austria, where under Joseph II a national Church was established according to the plan outlined. Joseph's brother, Leopold II, Grand Duke of Tuscany, made efforts in the same direction in the Grand Duchy of Tuscany. Lauchert wrote that it was Austrian canonists who contributed most towards the compilation of a new law code regulating the relations of Church and State, which was used under Joseph II; especially noteworthy were the textbooks on canon law prescribed for the Austrian universities, and compiled by Paul Joseph von Riegger, by Josef Johann Nepomuk Pehem, and by Johann Valentin Eybel.

Febronius inspired the proceedings of two ecclesiastical assemblies, both held in the year 1786: the resolutions adopted along these lines at the reforming Synod of Pistoia, under Bishop Scipione de' Ricci were repudiated by the majority of the bishops of the country; more significant was the Congress of Ems, at which the three ecclesiastic prince-electors — of Cologne, of Mainz and of Trier — and the prince-archbishop of Salzburg, in conformity with the basic principles of the "Febronius", made a fresh attempt to readjust the relations of the German Church with Rome, with a view to securing for the former a greater measure of independence; they also had their representatives draw up twenty-three articles of the celebrated Punctation of Ems, subsequently ratified and issued by the archbishops. This document was the outcome of several years of controversy between the archbishops and the Papal Nuncios, aroused by what was considered the unjustifiable interference of the latter in the affairs of the German dioceses.

In drawing up the Punctation of Ems he took no active part, but it was wholly inspired by his principles. It consisted of twenty-three articles, which may be summarized as follows. Bishops have, in virtue of their God-given powers, full authority within their dioceses in all matters of dispensation, patronage and the like; papal bulls, briefs, etc., and the decrees of the Roman Congregations are only of binding force in each diocese when sanctioned by the bishop; nunciatures, as hitherto conceived, are to cease; the oath of allegiance to the pope demanded of bishops since Pope Gregory VII's time is to be altered so as to bring it into conformity with episcopal rights; annates and the fees payable for the pallium and confirmation are to be lowered and, in the event of the pallium or confirmation being refused, German archbishops and bishops are to be free to exercise their office under the protection of the emperor; with the Church tribunals of first and second instance (episcopal and metropolitan) the Apostolic Nuncio to Cologne is not to interfere, and, though appeal to Rome is allowed under certain national safe-guards, the opinion is expressed that it would be better to set up in each archdiocese a final court of appeal representing the provincial synod; finally the emperor is prayed to use his influence with the pope to secure the assembly of a national council in order to remove the grievances left unredressed by the Council of Trent.

The Punctation of Ems, however, achieved no practical results.

Whether these manifestos would have led to a reconstitution of the Catholic Church on permanently Febronian lines must for ever remain doubtful. The French Revolution intervened; the German Church went down in the storm; and in 1803 the secularizations carried out by order of the First Consul put an end to the temporal ambitions of its prelates. Febronianism indeed, survived. Karl Theodor Anton Maria von Dalberg, prince primate of the Confederation of the Rhine, upheld its principles throughout the Napoleonic epoch and hoped to establish them in the new Germany to be created by the Congress of Vienna. He sent to this assembly, as representative of the German Church, Bishop Ignaz Heinrich von Wessenberg, who in his Bishopric of Constance had not hesitated to apply Febronian principles in reforming, on his own authority, the services and discipline of the Church. But the times were not favourable for such experiments. The tide of reaction after the Revolutionary turmoil was setting strongly in the direction of traditional authority, in religion as in politics; and that ultramontane movement which, before the century was ended, was to dominate the Church, was already showing signs of vigorous life. Moreover, the great national German Church of which Dalberg had a vision — with himself as primate — did not appeal to the German princes, tenacious of their newly acquired status as European powers. One by one these entered into concordats with Rome, and Febronianism from an aggressive policy subsided into a speculative opinion. As such it survived strongly, especially in the universities (Bonn especially had been, from its foundation in 1774, very Febronian), and it reasserted itself vigorously in the attitude of many of the most learned German prelates and professors towards the question of the definition of the Catholic dogma of Papal infallibility in 1870. It was, in fact, against the Febronian position that the decrees of the First Vatican Council were deliberately directed, and their promulgation marked the triumph of the ultramontane view. In Germany, indeed, the struggle against the papal monarchy was carried on for a while by the governments on the Kulturkampf, the Old Catholics representing militant Febronianism. The latter, however, since Otto von Bismarck "went to Canossa," have sunk into a respectable but comparatively obscure sect, and Febronianism, though it still has some hold on opinion within the Church in the chapters and universities of the Rhine provinces, is practically extinct in Germany. Its revival under the guise of Modernism drew from Pope Pius X in 1908 the scathing condemnation embodied in the encyclical Pascendi dominici gregis.

== See also ==
- Anticurialism
- First Vatican Council
- Gallicanism
- Jacob Anton Zallinger zum Thurn
- Josephinism
- Old University of Leuven
- Ultramontanism
