= Congress of Ems =

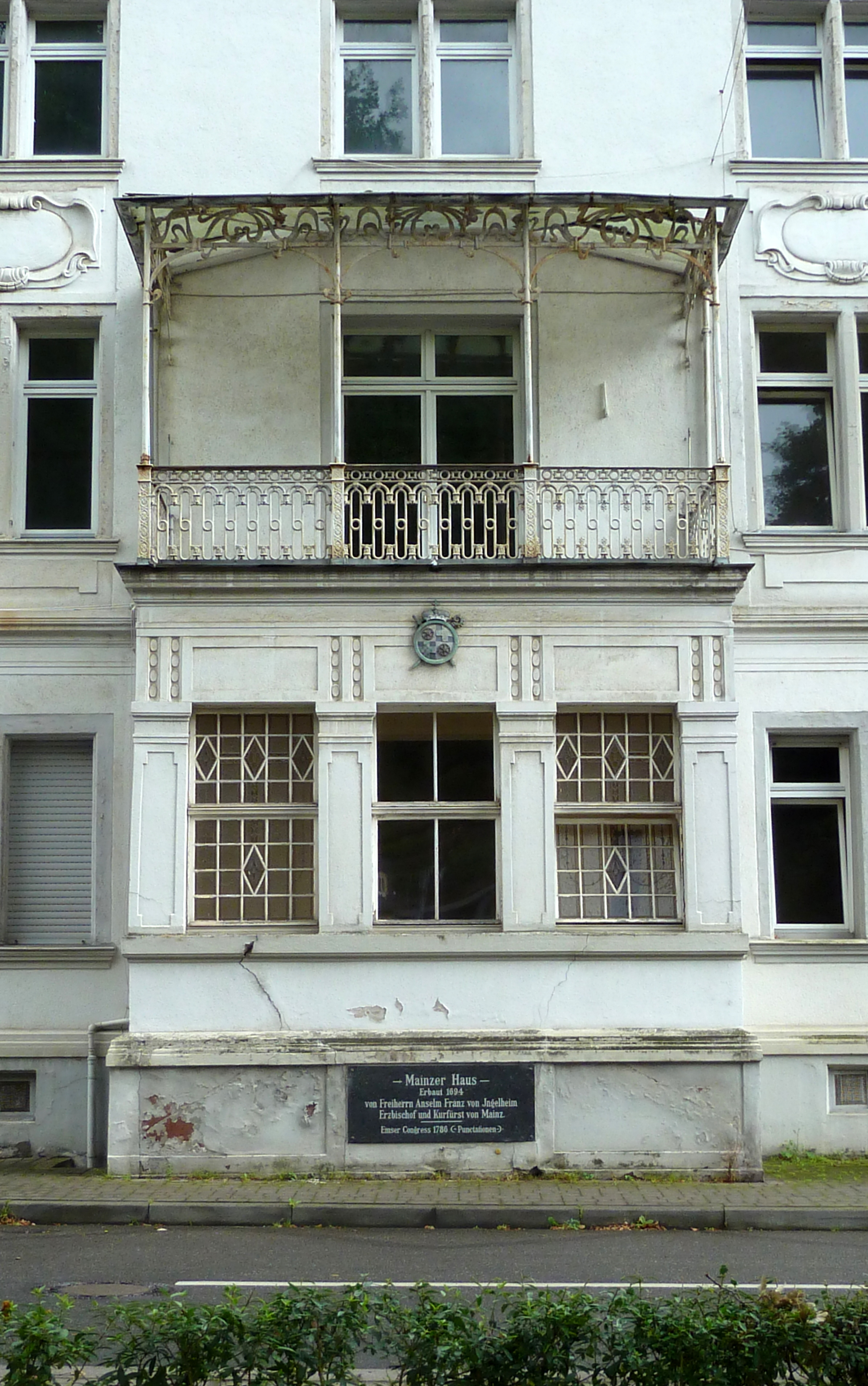
The Building in Bad Ems, Mainzer Straße

The Congress of Ems was a meeting set up by the four prince-archbishops of the Holy Roman Empire, and held in August 1786 at Bad Ems in the Electorate of Trier. Its object was to protest against papal interference in the exercise of episcopal powers, and to fix the future relations between the participating archbishops and the pope. Representatives of the three elector-archbishops: Friedrich Karl von Erthal of Mainz, Maximilian Franz of Cologne, Clemens Wenceslaus of Trier, as well as of Prince-Archbishop Hieronymus von Colloredo of Salzburg took part.

== Background ==
In 1763, Johann Nicolaus von Hontheim, auxiliary bishop of Trier, under the pseudonym Justinus Febronius, wrote about Gallicanism in De statu ecclesiae et legitima potestate Romani Pontificis. Von Hontheim's ideas became known as Febronianism. His ideas were shared by some influential archbishops of Germany, who were encouraged and supported by Joseph II, Holy Roman Emperor, who arrogated to himself both temporal and spiritual jurisdiction. As early as 1769, representatives of von Erthal, Maximilian Franz, and Clemens Wenceslaus met in Koblenz and wrote a list of thirty-one articles mostly directed against the Roman Curia.

In February 1785, Pope Pius VI erected the Apostolic Nunciature to Bavaria in Munich to represent the Holy See in the territories of Charles Theodore, Elector of Bavaria, which then comprised the Electorate of Bavaria, the Rhine Palatinate, the Duchy of Jülich and the Duchy of Berg. Archbishop Giulio Cesare Zoglio was appointed as nuncio with jurisdiction in those territories.

Pius VI erected this nunciature on the request of Charles Theodore, who was loath to have parts of his territory under the spiritual jurisdiction of bishops who, being electors like himself, were his equals than his subordinates. He had previously suggested to the Elector-Archbishops of Mainz, Cologne, and Trier to appoint special vicars-general for their districts in his territory. Upon their refusal he requested Pius VI to erect separate dioceses for his territory, but in deference to the wishes of the three elector-archbishops, the pope also refused. Finally the Elector of Bavaria asked for the above-mentioned nunciature, and despite the protests of the archbishops his wish was granted.

Meanwhile, Cardinal Carlo Bellisomi, the Apostolic Nuncio to Cologne, was transferred to Lisbon, and Archbishop Bartolomeo Pacca was appointed to succeed Bellisomi as nuncio. Archbishop Maximilian Franz, a brother of Joseph II, refused to see Pacca, and none of the three elector-archbishops honoured Pacca's credentials. Despite protests, both Pacca and Zoglio began to exercise their powers as nuncios.

== The Punctation of Ems ==
Relying on the support which Joseph II had promised, the three elector-archbishops and the Archbishop of Salzburg planned concerted action against Rome and sent their representatives to Ems to hold a congress. Von Erthal, was represented by his auxiliary bishop, Johann Valentin Heimes; Franz, by his privy councillor Heinrich von Tautphäus; Clemens Wenceslaus, by his privy councillor and official representative in temporal matters, Joseph Ludwig Beck; Colloredo, by his consistorial councillor, Johann Michael Bönicke. On 25 August 1786, these representatives signed the Punctation of Ems, consisting of twenty-three articles which aimed to make the archbishops within the Holy Roman Empire practically independent of the Holy See. (Note: For the text of the articles see Münch, Ernst H., ed. (1831). Vollständige Sammlung aller älteren und neueren Konkordate. Vol. 1. Leipzig. pp. 404–423.)

The Punctation maintains that all prerogatives and reservations which were not actually connected with the primacy during the first three centuries owe their origin to the pseudo-Isidorian Decretals, universally acknowledged as false, and, hence, that the bishops must look upon all interference of the Roman Curia with the exercise of their episcopal functions in their own dioceses as encroachments on their rights. Upon these principles the four archbishops requested that:

- direct appeals to Rome must be discontinued
- exempt monasteries must become subjects of the bishops in whose diocese those monasteries are located
- monasteries in the Holy Roman Empire must have generals, provincials, or other superiors who reside in the Holy Roman Empire
- diocesan bishops do not need delegated quinquennial faculties granted by the Holy See, because by virtue of their office they can dispense from abstinence, from matrimonial impediments, including the second degree of consanguinity and the second and first degrees of affinity, from solemn religious vows and the obligations resulting from Holy Orders
- Papal Bulls and ordinances of the Roman Curia are binding in each diocese only after the assent of the respective diocesan bishop
- all Apostolic Nunciatures must be abolished
- the manner of conferring benefices and the procedure in ecclesiastical trials must favor bishops
- the episcopal oath must not appear to be an oath of a vassal

The articles advocated for independence of the archbishops from the pope; the four archbishops ratified the articles and sent them to Joseph II for his support.

== Aftermath ==
Joseph II was pleased with the articles but, on the advice of his council and especially Wenzel Anton, Prince of Kaunitz-Rietberg, did not unconditionally support the articles for political reasons. In November 1786, Joseph II made his support dependent on the condition that the archbishops gain the consent of their suffragan bishops, the superiors of the exempt monasteries, and the imperial estates into whose territories their spiritual jurisdiction extends. The suffragan bishops, especially the prince-bishops August Philip of Limburg Stirum of Speyer and Franz Ludwig von Erthal of Würzburg-Bamberg (brother of Friedrich Karl von Erthal), protested against the articles and saw the anti-papal procedure of the four archbishops as an attempt to increase their own power. The Elector of Bavaria likewise remained a defender of the pope and his nuncio at Munich, and even the Protestant King Frederick II of Prussia was an opponent of the Punctation and favoured Pacca.

Still the four archbishops insisted on their demands. When Pacca granted a matrimonial dispensation from the second degree of consanguinity to Prince von Hohenlohe-Bartenstein and Countess Blankenheim, Maximilian Franz forbid Pacca from exercising any jurisdiction in the Archdiocese of Cologne. The archbishops themselves now began to grant dispensations from such degrees of relationship as were not contained in their ordinary quinquennial faculties, just as if the Punctation was in full force.

When Pacca, by order of the pope, informed the pastors that all marriages contracted without Holy See dispensations were invalid, the four archbishops ordered their pastors to return the circular to the nuncio and to obtain all future dispensations directly from their ordinaries, the archbishops. The Church in Germany was now near to a schism. At that time, von Erthal of Mainz needed the services of Rome. He desired Karl Theodor von Dalberg as coadjutor, and, to obtain the consent of Rome, he withdrew, at least apparently, from the Punctation and obtained a renewal of his quinquennial faculties from Rome on 9 August 1787. Similarly the Archbishop of Trier asked for quinquennial faculties as Bishop of Augsburg, but not as Archbishop of Trier.

Von Erthal's submission to Rome was only a pretended one. He continued his opposition and on 2 June 1788, requested Joseph II, in the name of himself and the three other archbishops, to bring the affair concerning both nuncios before a Diet. The archbishops discovered that all the imperial estates were opposed to the Punctation and that a diet would rather retard than accelerate the fulfilment of their wishes. For this reason they wrote to the Holy See, in December 1788, asking the pope to withdraw the faculties from both nuncios and send legates to the imperial estates with authorized to negotiate an agreement with the archbishops.

Pius VI replied to the Punctation in 1789. Pius VI refuted all the arguments of the archbishops against papal nunciatures, argued it was wrong for the archbishops to rebel against papal authority, explained that the pope cannot send representatives to states who have no right to pass judgment on ecclesiastical affairs, and admonished the archbishops to give up their untenable position towards the Holy See.

Clemens Wenceslaus, desired an amicable settlement of the affair, publicly withdrew from the Punctation on 20 February 1790, and admonished his colleagues to follow his example. They, however, continued their opposition and on occasion of the imperial capitulation of Emperor Leopold II (1790) and that of Emperor Franz II (1792) obtained the promise that their complaints concerning the nunciatures would be attended to as soon as possible by a decree of the Diet. The threatening progress of the French Revolution finally changed the attitude of the Archbishops of Cologne and Salzburg, but the Archbishop of Mainz clung to the Punctation until the victorious French army invaded his electorate, and he was deprived of all his possessions west of the Rhine, at the Peace of Campo Formio, in 1797.
