= Friedrich Karl Joseph von Erthal =

Elector of Mainz from 1774 to 1802

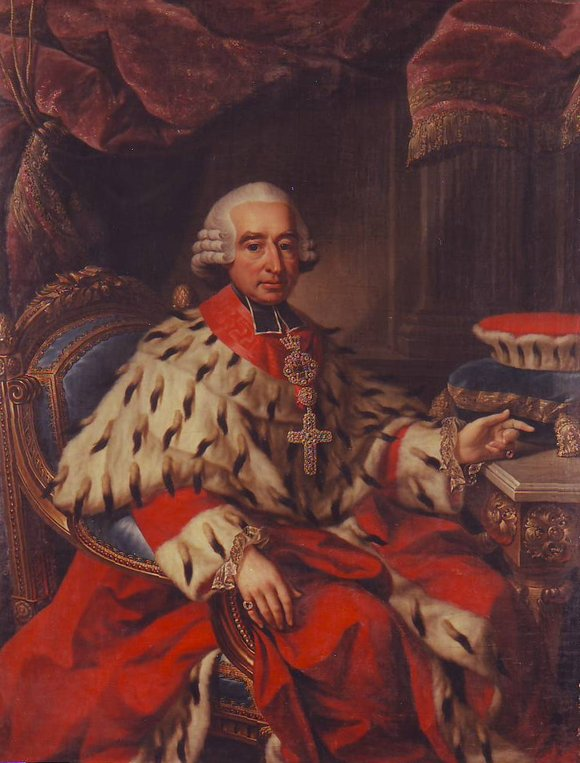
- Portrait by Georg Anton Abraham Urlaub, 1786

Elector of Mainz
- Reign: 18 July 1774 – 4 July 1802
- Predecessor: Emmerich Joseph von Breidbach zu Bürresheim
- Successor: Karl Theodor von Dalberg
- Born: 3 January 1719; Lohr am Main
- Died: 25 July 1802 (aged 83); Aschaffenburg
- Burial: St. Peter und Alexander
- Archbishop of Mainz
- Church: Catholic Church
- Archdiocese: Mainz
- In office: 18 July 1774 – 4 July 1802
- Predecessor: Emmerich Joseph von Breidbach zu Bürresheim
- Successor: Karl Theodor von Dalberg

Friedrich Karl Joseph Reichsfreiherr von Erthal (3 January 1719 – 25 July 1802) was prince-elector and archbishop of Mainz from 18 July 1774 to 4 July 1802, shortly before the end of the archbishopric in the Reichsdeputationshauptschluss.

== Family ==
Born in Lohr am Main on 3 January 1719, into the House of Erthal, an ancient Franconian noble family, Friedrich Karl Joseph was the son of Baron Philipp Christoph von und zu Erthal (1689-1748), Lord Marshal and Vice-President of the Chamber of Electorate of Mainz, and his wife, Baroness Maria Eva von Bettendorf (d. 1738). His younger brother, Franz Ludwig von Erthal, was the Prince-Bishop of Würzburg and Bamberg.

== Election ==
Erthal's predecessor, archbishop Emmerich Joseph von Breidbach zu Bürresheim, had introduced some ideas of the Enlightenment, and had been a popular figure. After his death, the Domkapitel was split in two fractions, one representing the openness to reform of the Enlightenment, the larger one advocating immediate restoration. Directly after the death of archbishop Emmerich Joseph, Friedrich von Erthal, then Domkustos, was charged with reducing the influence of the Enlightenment in the schools and monasteries of the archbishopric. After his election on 18 July 1774, and his election as Bishop of Worms, he assigned many opponents of the Enlightenment to important positions.

Both the papal nuncio and the emperor Joseph II had expected Erthal's election to improve relationships with the Archbishopric. However, Erthal, in his position as Archchancellor wanted to have an important role in the politics of the Holy Roman Empire himself, opposing the dynastical tendencies of the Emperor. In 1785, he even joined the Prussian-led mostly Protestant Fürstenbund, a coalition of princes organized to oppose Joseph's scheme to exchange Bavaria for Belgium.

== Relationship to the Enlightenment ==
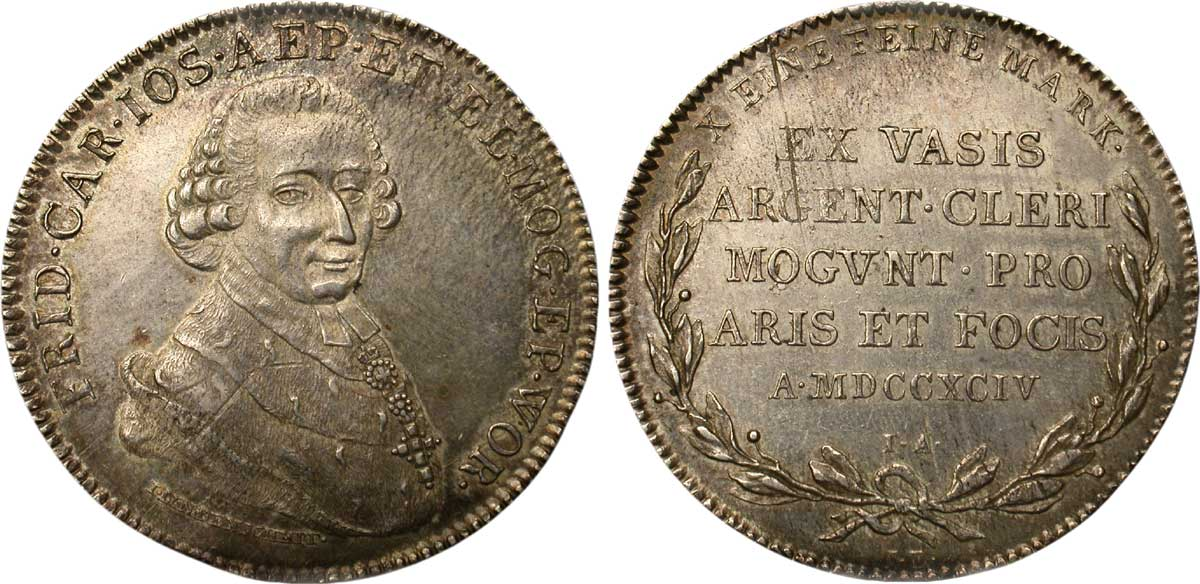
Friedrich Karl Joseph von Erthal, 1794

Erthal did not pursue his opposition to the enlightenment for very long, reinstating the modern government of his predecessor in 1777. After 1781, Erthal's politics were dominated by the Enlightenment. The universities of Mainz and Erfurt were reformed according to new ideas, and a hymnal in German language was published. He became one of the most notable supporters of free-thought in theology and of Febronianism in the government of the Church. Georg Forster, a Protestant, became his librarian and William Heinse, another Protestant, and author of the lascivious romance "Ardinghello", was his official reader. Erthal suppressed the Carthusian monastery and two nunneries at Mainz and used their revenues to meet the expenses of the university, in which he appointed numerous Protestants and free-thinkers as professors. Notorious unbelievers such as Felix Anthony Blau and others were invited to the university in 1784 to supplant the Jesuits in the faculty of theology.

== Theological position ==
As a spiritual ruler, Erthal was guided by the principles of Febronianism. In union with the Archbishops Max Franz of Cologne, Clemens Wenzeslaus of Trier, and Hieronymus Joseph of Salzburg he convoked the Congress of Ems at which twenty-three antipapal articles, known as the Punctation of Ems, were drawn up and signed by the plenipotentiaries of the four archbishops on 25 August 1786. The purpose of the punctation was to lower the papal dignity to a merely honorary primacy and to make the pope a primus inter pares, with practically no authority over the territories of the archbishops. In order to increase his political influence he joined (25 October 1785) the Confederation of Princes which was established by King Frederick the Great. In 1787, he apparently receded from the schismatic position of the Punctation of Ems and applied to Rome for a renewal of his quinquennial faculties and for the approbation of his new coadjutor, Karl Theodor von Dalberg. Somewhat later, however, he resumed his opposition to papal authority and continued to adhere to the punctation even after the other archbishops had rejected it.

== End of the archbishopric ==
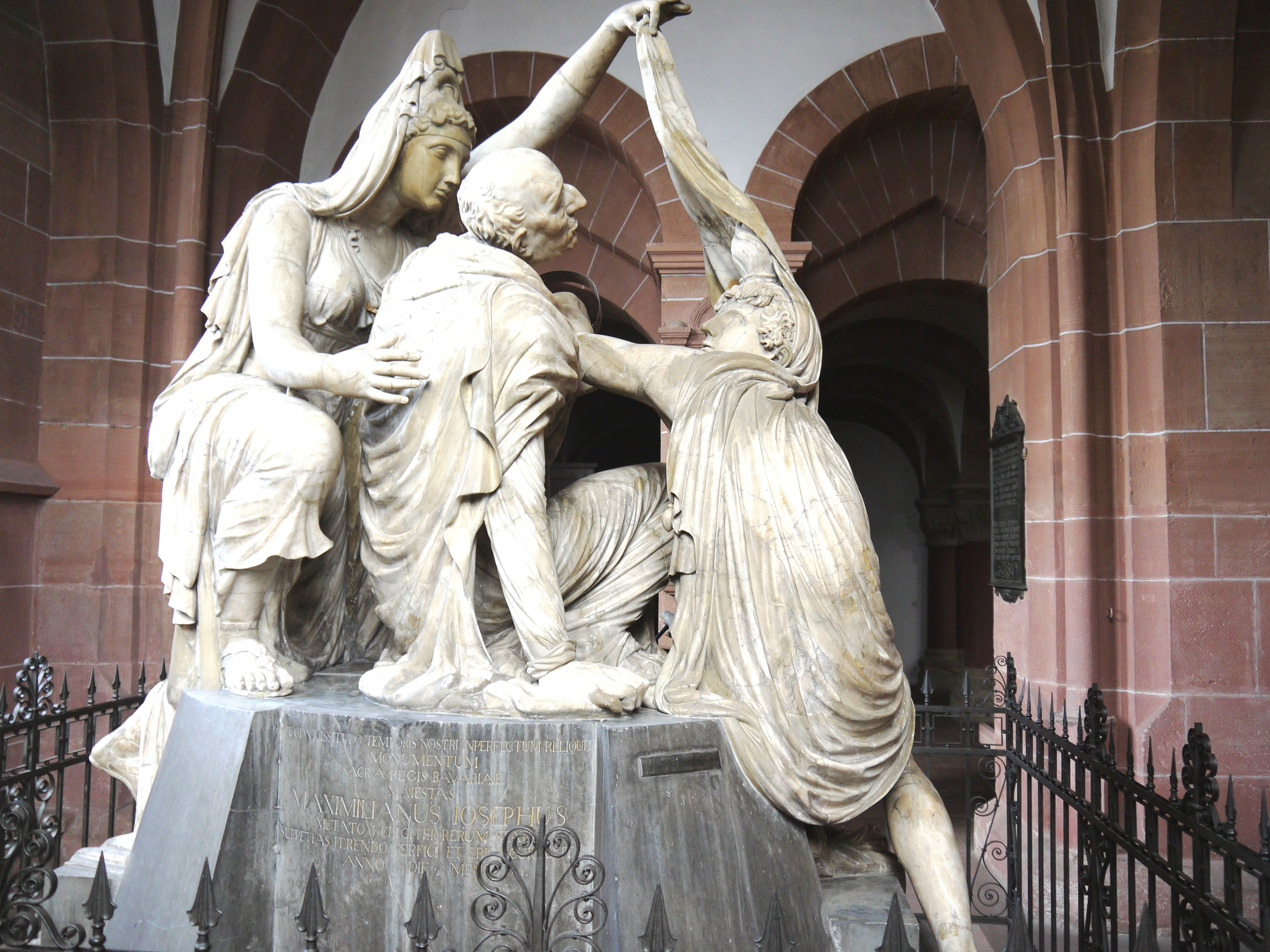
Neoclassical tomb of Friedrich Karl Joseph von Erthal at Aschaffenburg, showing him allegorically as a dying hero of antiquity

His opposition was made futile by the revolutionary wars: The troops of General Custine occupied Mainz on 21 October 1792; Mainz capitulated without a fight. Erthal fled to Aschaffenburg for the time of the republican government in Mainz.

By the treaty of Campo Formio in 1797 Erthal was deprived of his possessions west of the Rhine and by the Concordat of 1801 he lost also spiritual jurisdiction over that part of his diocese. The negotiations concerning the reimbursement of Erthal for the loss of his territory west of the Rhine were not yet completed when he died on 25 July 1802, and was succeeded as archbishop by Karl Theodor Anton Maria von Dalberg.

Erthal is buried in St. Peter und Alexander collegiate church at Aschaffenburg.

== Other ==
Near his secondary residence, Schloss Johannisburg in Aschaffenburg, he created the Schönbusch Palace with one of the first English landscape gardens of Germany. On the Rhine island of Petersaue, he constructed Schloss Petersaue.

Catholic Church titles
Preceded by Emmerich Joseph von Breidbach zu Bürresheim	Archbishop of Mainz; 1774–1802	Succeeded by Karl Theodor Anton Maria von Dalberg
Preceded by Emmerich Joseph von Breidbach zu Bürresheim	Prince-Bishop of Worms; 1774–1802	Succeeded by Karl Theodor Anton Maria von Dalberg
