= Montquintin Castle =

Castle in Wallonia, Belgium

Coordinates: 49.545°N 5.472°E

- Belgium
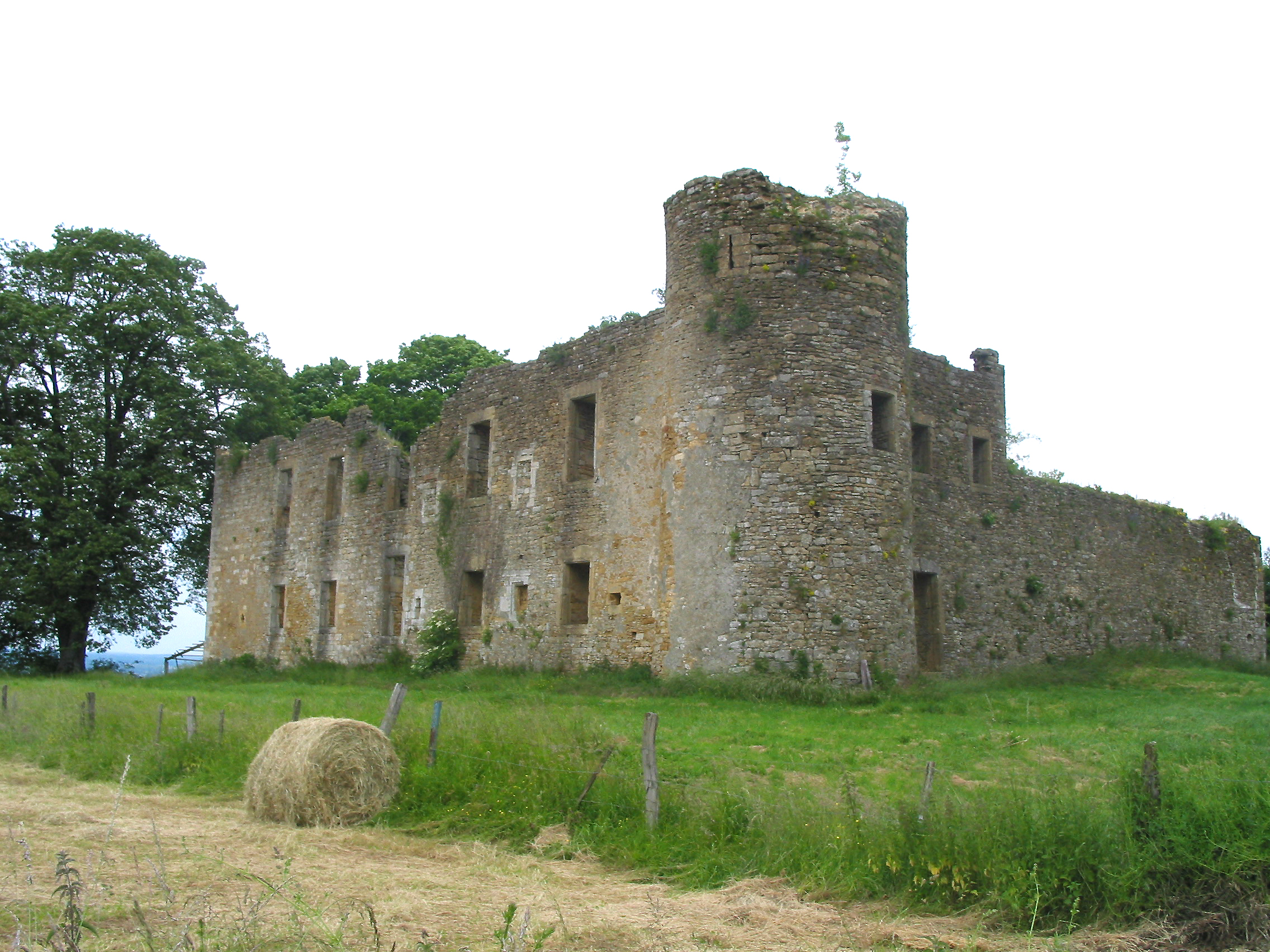

Site information
- Type: Castle

Montquintin Castle is an ancient feudal castle, now in ruins, situated on a ridge overlooking the valley of Ton, to Montquintin (municipality of Rouvroy) in Gaume in the extreme south of the province of Luxembourg, Wallonia, Belgium.

== History ==
Originally the castle was probably only designed to defend the southern border of the counts of Chiny. It was built by order of Louis II, Count of Chiny.

In the Middle Age, Montquintin was part of Chiny County and its fortified castle was the stronghold of Latour.

After many vicissitudes, destruction and transformation, it became in 1760 the retirement of Bishop Jean-Nicolas de Hontheim, bishop suffragan of Trier, which purchased the Count de Baillet-Latour. Hontheim distinguished himself from 1763, under the pseudonym Justinus Febronius by his revolutionary theories called "Febronianism", on the authority of the Roman Curia and Pope Clement V. The deed of sale dated 20 November 1753, between the lord of Reumont and Count de Baillet, described as the castle had to find the Bishop of Hontheim seven years later: "That stately home applied to several homes, lower courtyard, high court, dovecote, all enclosed by ditches and high walls, with towers and turrets, drawbridge, surrounded by deep ditches heretofore to whitewater populated fish."

In 1869 a fire reduced the home to the ruins. They are being restored .

== Transformations ==
Over the centuries the castle has undergone many changes: The left wing: outbuildings where were the kitchens: bread oven is still there today. The right wing: the round cylindrical (steep side) is characteristic of the Middle Ages . Nevertheless, she was fitted given the evolution of armaments (piercing of an arquebusière multiple holes). The basement of this wing includes a vaulted cellar, which is very well preserved. The central part does not date from the Middle Ages but the eighteenth century . It was rebuilt by the Bishop of Hontheim, last owner.

== See also ==
- List of castles in Belgium
