= Jacob Anton Zallinger zum Thurn =

Italian philosopher and canonist (1735-1813)

Jacob Anton Zallinger zum Thurn (born in Bolzano, 26 July 1735 – died there, 11 January 1813) was a philosopher and canonist.

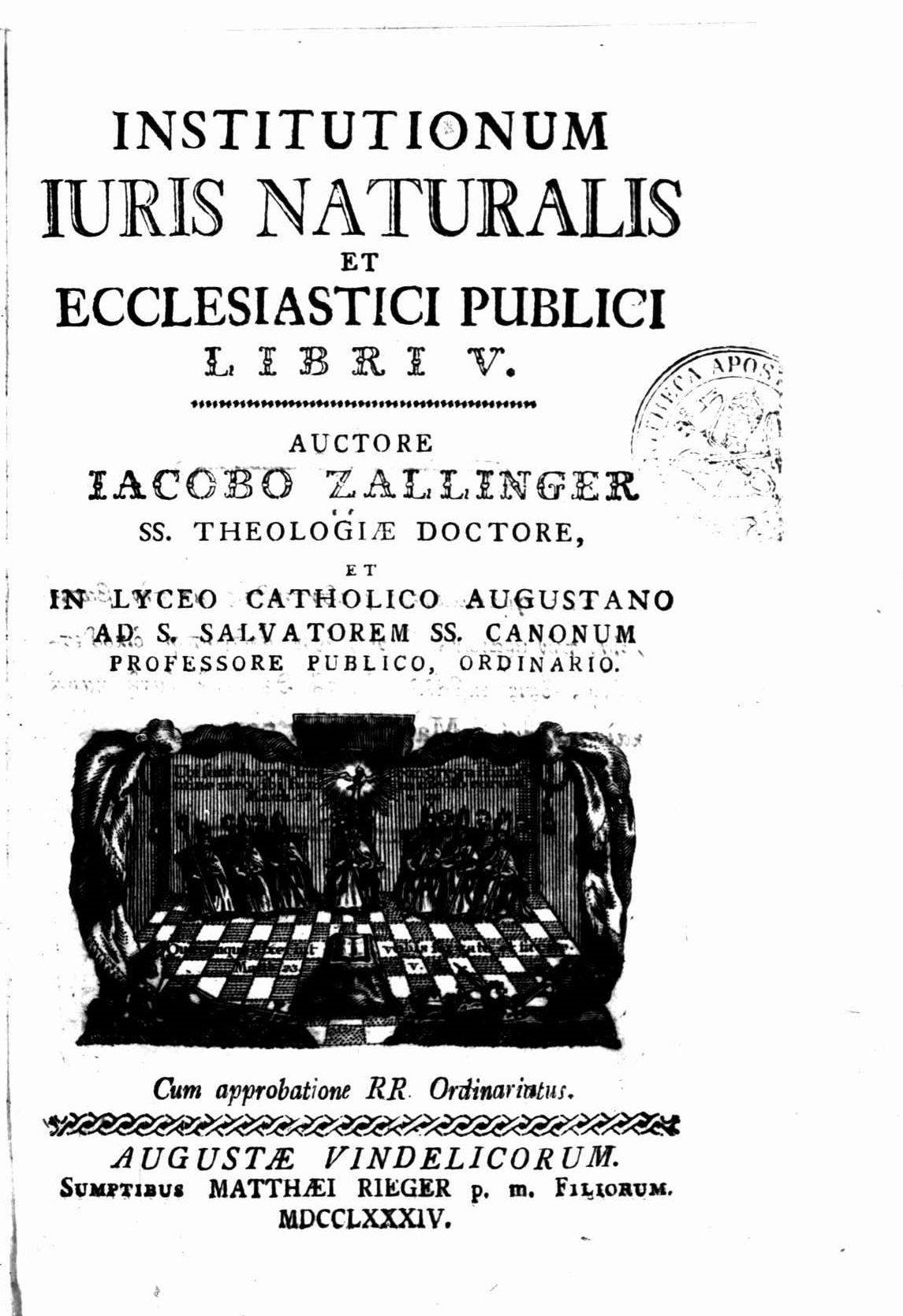
Institutiones iuris naturalis et ecclesiastici publici, 1784

== Biography ==
Zallinger studied at Innsbruck and Munich, and entered the Jesuit order at Landsberg am Lech on 9 October 1753. He taught philosophy at Munich from 1758 to 1761, before going to Ingolstadt to study theology. Zallinger was ordained priest on 1 June 1765.

After the suppression of the Jesuits in 1773, Zallinger taught philosophy in Dillingen, and then physics in Innsbruck in 1777 before going to Augsburg at the invitation of Prince-bishop Clemens Wenceslaus of Saxony, who engaged him as professor of canon law, at the College of St. Salvator. He held this position for thirty years (1777-1807). From 1797 to 1802, he also served as rector of the university.

In 1805, he spent four months as theologian at the papal nunciature at Ratisbon; followed by sixteen months, upon invitation of Pius VII spent in Rome as papal councillor in German affairs (1805-06). He also taught in Trento.

In 1807 his position at the college ended and he was released without a pension. He returned to Bolzano, where he lived with family members, devoting the rest of his life to literary labours. As a canonist he defended the papal rights again the Febronian tendencies in Germany, and as a philosopher he endeavoured to replace the scholastic method by the empiricism of Isaac Newton. "Zallinger zum Thurn was a recognized authority on Newton's theory of gravitation."

== Works ==
His best-known work is Interpretatio naturae, seu philosophia Newtoniana methodo exposita (3 vols., Augsburg, 1773), wherein he defends the Copernican account of the Solar System, and Newton's empiricism.

His chief canonical works are:

- Institutionum juris naturalis et ecclesiastici publici libri V (Augsburg, 1784; Ghent, 1823; Rome, 1832)
- De usu publici commentariolus (Augsburg, 1784; Ghent, 1823)
- Historische Bemerkungen über das sogenannte Resultat des Emser Congresses (Frankfort and Leipzig, 1787)
- Institutiones juris ecclesiastici, maxime privati, ordine Decretalium (5 vols., Augsburg, 1792–3; 3 vols., Rome, 1832)

His chief philosophical works are:

- Lex gravitatis universalis ac mutuae cum theoria de sectione coni (Munich, 1769)
- Disquisitiones philosophiae Kantianae (2 vols., Augsburg, 1799)
