= Protector of the Confederation of the Rhine =

Title held by Napoleon, Emperor of the French

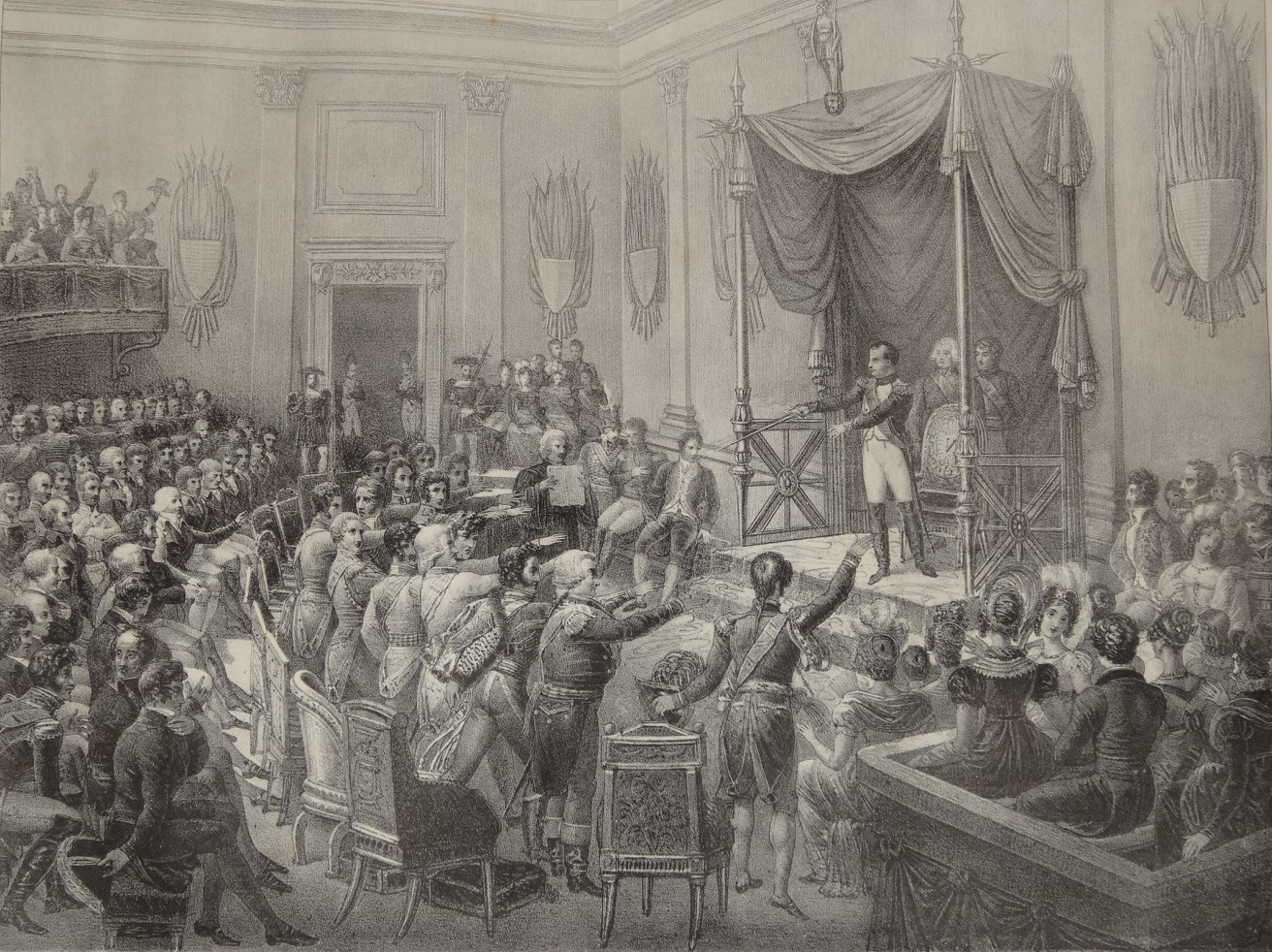
The German princes render homage to the protector Napoleon, shortly after the ratification of the Confederation Treaty. This lithograph by Charles Motte was possibly made in the 1820s. The depiction should not be read literally; some princes were represented by envoys.

Chart for the confederation as projected in the treaty of 1806

Protector of the Confederation of the Rhine was the title held by Napoleon, Emperor of the French, in his function as leader of the Confederation of the Rhine (1806–1813). The term in French was Protecteur de la Confédération, in German Protector des rheinischen Bundes. The title was created by the Treaty of the Confederation of the Rhine, which was an international treaty between the emperor and some German princes. The treaty text mentions the emperor only once explicitly:

Art. 12. His Majesty the Emperor of the French will be called Protector of the Rhenish Confederation, and in this virtue the same will appoint the successor of the prince-primate after every departure.

The prince-primate was the chair of the Federal Assembly, the unrealised convention of the member states. The treaty remains silent about the function of the federal protector. For example, the treaty does not say that the protector guarantees the territorial integrity of the member states, although the treaty adjusts a number of territorial changes.

For Napoleon, the Confederation of the Rhine was an instrument to secure the military support of the Rhenish states when necessary. The power balance was one-sided; France alone decided when to mobilise (Art .36). France and the Rhenish states were allowed to negotiate international treaties, including with states outside of the Confederation. The protector usually did not consult with his allies at the important peace settlements of the time.

The treaty says that the Rhenish states had to be independent from foreign powers. They were allowed to decline their sovereignty in total or partially only to other Rhenish states (Art. 7, Art. 8). In 1810 and 1811, the member states Westphalia and Berg ceded territory to France. As France was not a member of the Confederation, they violated Art. 8.

== See also ==
- Emperor of the French
- List of French client states
- Sister republic
- Duchy of Warsaw
- Kingdom of Holland
- Kingdom of Italy (Napoleonic)
- Austria under Napoleon
- Prussia under Napoleon
- Spain under Joseph Bonaparte
