= Friedrich Lauchert =

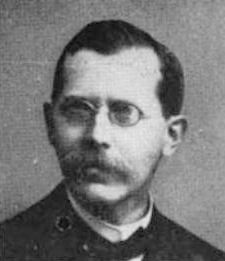
Friedrich Lauchert

Friedrich Lauchert (1 September 1863 – 18 April 1944) was a German Old Catholic and later Roman Catholic church historian.

As well as his research interests in patristics and 16th and 19th century theological history, he was mainly interested in Martin Luther's literary opponents such as Thomas Murner.

== Life ==
Born in Meßkirch, he studied philosophy and Catholic theology at the Ludwig-Maximilians-Universität München, the University of Strasbourg, and the University of Vienna, and gained his doctorate at the Ludwig-Maximilians-Universität München in 1886 with a thesis entitled Herder's Greek and oriental anthology and his translations of Jakob Balde considered by comparison with the originals. From 1888 to 1890 and again from 1893 to 1895, he was a research assistant at the University and State Library in Strasbourg, where in 1889 he also passed the state exam in philology in 1889.

Two years later, he gained a licentiate in theology at the University of Bern and worked there from 1893 onwards as a private lecturer in patristics and the history of Christian literature. He was a professor at the Old Catholic Faculty of the University of Bonn from 1895 to 1899, but then resigned that post and converted to Roman Catholicism. After three years as a private tutor in Munich, he was appointed to the City Library in Aachen in 1901, becoming the city librarian thirteen years later. He held this position until retiring in 1928 and died in Siersdorf in 1944.

== Selected works ==
- Geschichte des Physiologus. K. J. Trübner, Straßburg 1889
- G. Chr. Lichtenberg’s schriftstellerische Thätigkeit in chronologischer Uebersicht dargestellt. Dietrich’sche Verlagsbuchhandlung, Göttingen 1893
- Die Lehre des heiligen Athanasius des Grossen. Fock, Leipzig 1895
- Studien zu Thomas Murner. In:
  - Alemannia. Vol. 18, 1890, p. 139–172 and (dictionary, part 1) p. 283–288
  - Alemannia. Vol. 19, 1892, p. 1–18 (dictionary, part 2).
- Franz Anton Staudenmaier (1800–1856) in seinem Leben und Wirken dargestellt. Herder, Freiburg i. Br. 1901
- Die italienischen literarischen Gegner Luthers. Herder, Freiburg i. Br. 1912
- Die Kanones der wichtigsten altkirchlichen Concilien nebst den apostolischen Kanones. P. Siebecki, Freiburg i. Br. 1896
- over 180 entries in the Allgemeine Deutsche Biographie

== Bibliography (in German) ==
- Remigius Bäumer: Lauchert, Friedrich. In: Walter Kasper (ed.): Lexikon für Theologie und Kirche. 3. Auflage. Volume 6. Herder, Freiburg im Breisgau 1997, Sp. 679.
- Remigius Bäumer (1982). "Lauchert, Friedrich". Neue Deutsche Biographie (in German). Vol. 13. Berlin: Duncker & Humblot. pp. 698–698. (full text online).
