= Johann Nikolaus von Hontheim =

German historian and theologian (1701–1790)

- Born: January 27, 1701; Trier, Electorate of Trier
- Died: September 2, 1790 (aged 89); Montquintin Castle,Habsburg Netherlands

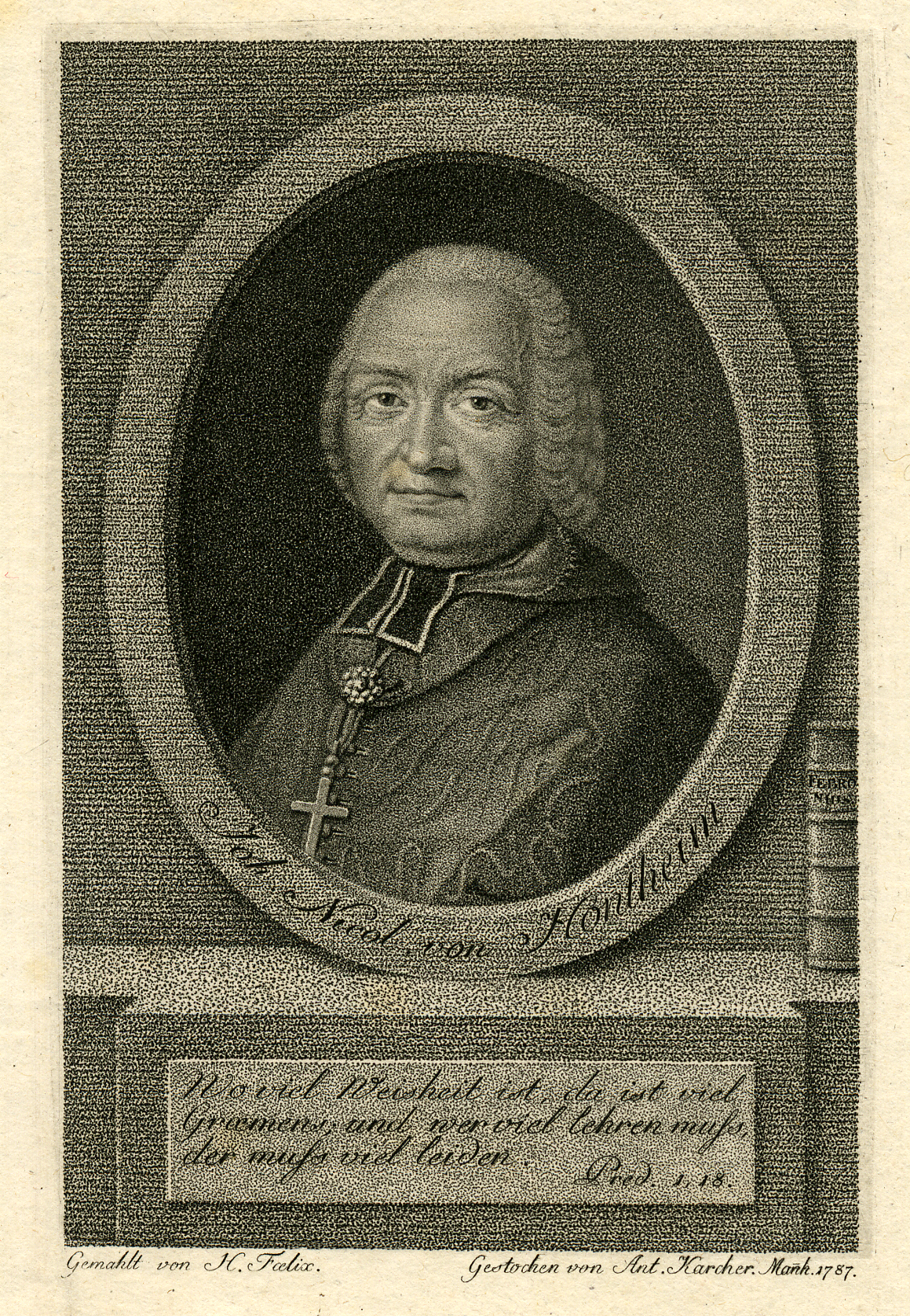
Febronius

Johann Nikolaus von Hontheim (27 January 1701 – 2 September 1790) was a German Catholic priest and coadjutor bishop of Trier, and a historian/theologian. He is remembered as Febronius, the pseudonym under which he wrote his 1763 treatise On the State of the Church and the Legitimate Power of the Roman Pontiff and which gave rise to Febronianism.

== Biography ==
Born in Trier on 27 January 1701, he belonged to a noble family which had been for many generations connected with the court and government of the Electors of Trier, his father, Kaspar von Hontheim, was receiver-general of the Electorate. At the age of twelve, young Hontheim was given by his maternal uncle, Hugo Frederick von Anethan, canon of the collegiate church of St Simeon (which at that time still occupied the Roman Porta Nigra at Trier), a prebend in his church, and on 13 May 1713, he received the tonsure. He was educated by the Jesuits at Trier and at the universities of Trier, Leuven, and Leiden, taking his degree of doctor of laws at Trier in 1724. The works of the Louvain professor Zeger Bernhard van Espen and his Gallican doctrine had a great influence on Hontheim.

During the following years, he traveled in various European countries, spending some time at the German College in Rome; in 1728, he was ordained a priest, and, formally admitted to the chapter of St. Simeon in 1732, he became a professor of the Pandects at the University of Trier.

In 1738 he was sent on official duty by the Elector to Coblenz, where he discharged the duties of official and president of the Grand Séminaire of that city. In that capacity, he had plenty of opportunities to study the effect of the influence of the Roman Curia on the internal affairs of the Empire, notably in the negotiations that preceded the elections of the emperors Charles VII and Francis I, in which Hontheim took part as an assistant to the electoral ambassador. It appears that it was the claims of the papal nuncio on these occasions, and his interference in the affairs of the electoral college, that first suggested to Hontheim that a critical examination of the basis of the papal involvement was needed (the results of which he afterwards published to the world under the pseudonym of Febronius).

In 1747, broken down by overwork, he resigned his position as an official and retired to St. Simeon, of which he was elected dean in the following year. In May 1748 he was appointed by the archbishop-elector Francis George von Schönborn as his auxiliary bishop, being consecrated at Mainz, in February 1749, under the title of bishop of Myriophiri in partibus. Upon Hontheim as auxiliary bishop and vicar-general fell the whole spiritual administration of the diocese; this work, in addition to that of pro-chancellor of the university, he carried on single-handed until 1778, when Jean-Marie Cuchot d'Herbain was appointed his coadjutor. On 21 April 1779, he resigned the deanery of St. Simeon's on the grounds of old age.

He was a man of short stature, energetic, hard-working, pious, and generous. He died on 2 September 1790, at Château de Montquintin near Orval, an estate which he had purchased. He was buried at first in St. Simeon's; but the church was ruined by the French during the revolutionary wars and never restored, and in 1803 the body of Hontheim was transferred to that of St Gervasius.

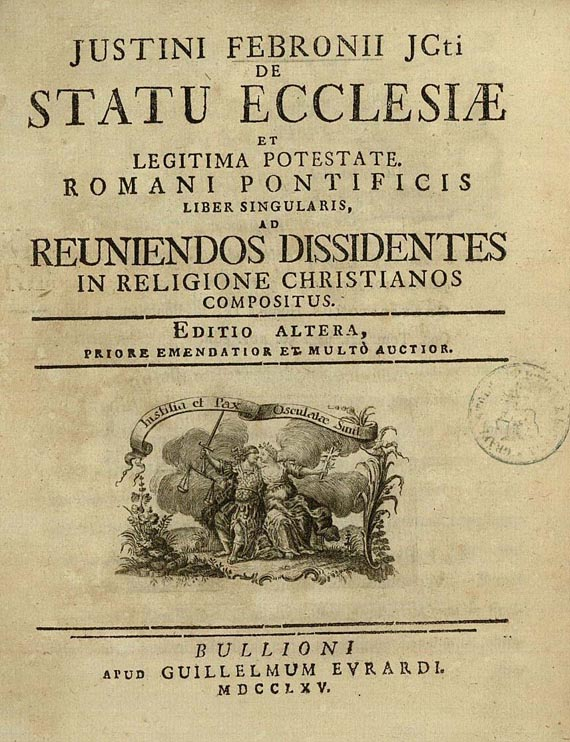
Febronius' treatise De Statu Ecclesiae

== Historian ==
As a historian, Hontheim's reputation rests on his contributions to the history of Trier. During the period of his activity as an official at Coblenz he found time to collect a vast mass of printed and manuscript material, which he afterwards embodied in three works on the history of Trier. Of these, the Historia Trevirensis diplomatica et pragmatica was published in 3 folio volumes in 1750, the Prodromus historiae Trevirensis in 2 volumes in 1757. Besides a history of Trier and its constitution, they give a large number of documents and references to published authorities. A third work, the Historiae scriptorum et monumentarum Trevirensis omptissima collectio, remains in manuscript in the city library of Trier. These books, the result of an enormous labor in collation and selection in very unfavorable circumstances, entitle Hontheim to the fame of a pioneer in modern historical methods.

It is, however, as Febronius that Hontheim is best remembered. His 1763 treatise "On the State of the Church and the Legitimate Power of the Roman Pontiff" offered Europe the "foremost formulation of the arguments against papal absolutism in Germany". The author of the book was known in Rome almost as soon as it was published, but it was not until some years afterwards (1778) that he was called on to retract. Threatened with excommunication and faced with the prospect of his relations losing their offices, Hontheim, after much vacillation and correspondence, signed a submission which was accepted in Rome as satisfactory. The removal of the censure followed (1781) when Hontheim published in Frankfurt what purported to be proof that his submission had been made of his own free will (Justini Febronii acti commentarius in suam retractationem, etc.). This book, however, which carefully avoided all the most burning questions, rather tended to show – as indeed his correspondence proves – that Hontheim had not essentially shifted his opinion.
