= Emmerich Joseph von Breidbach zu Bürresheim =

- Archbishop of Mainz
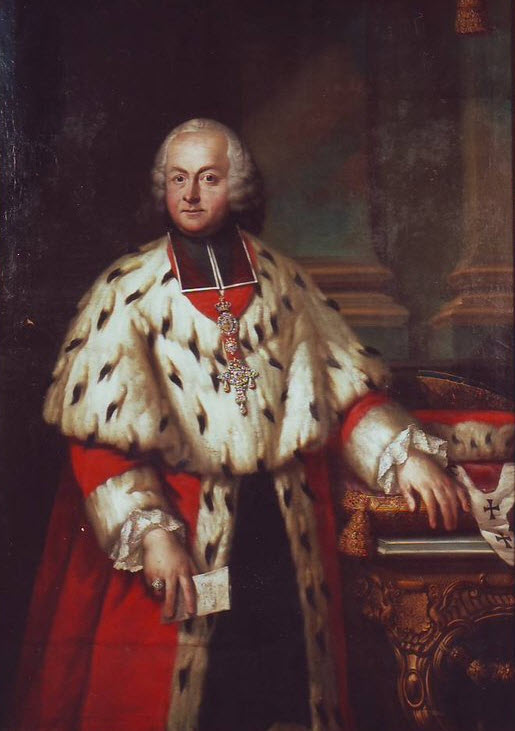
- Church: Catholic Church
- Diocese: Electorate of Mainz
- In office: 5 July 1763–11 June 1774

Personal details
- Born: 12 November 1707
- Died: 11 June 1774 (aged 66)

Emmerich Joseph von Breidbach zu Bürresheim (12 November 1707 – 11 June 1774) was the Archbishop-Elector of Mainz from 1763 to 1774 and Prince-Bishop of Worms from 1768 to 1774, in which capacities he was notable for introducing reforms inspired by the Enlightenment.

== Biography ==
A member of the noble house associated with Bürresheim Castle, Emmerich Joseph von Breidbach zu Bürresheim was born in Koblenz on 12 November 1707. From 1752 onward, he was associated with Anton Heinrich Friedrich von Stadion, the Grand Steward of the electoral court of Archbishop of Mainz Johann Friedrich Karl von Ostein. Anton Heinrich Friedrich von Stadion was associated with the introduction of Enlightenment-inspired reforms in the Archbishopric of Mainz.

Emmerich Joseph von Breidbach zu Bürresheim was ordained as a priest in Mainz on 5 October 1758, becoming the dean of Mainz Cathedral. Following the death of Johann Friedrich Karl von Ostein on 4 June 1763, the cathedral chapter of Mainz Cathedral elected Emmerich Joseph von Breidbach zu Bürresheim as Archbishop of Mainz on 5 July 1763. Pope Clement XIII confirmed his appointment on 22 October 1763. He was subsequently consecrated as a bishop by Christoph Nebel, Auxiliary Bishop of Mainz, on 13 November 1763. The cathedral chapter of Worms Cathedral elected him Bishop of Worms on 1 March 1768, with Clement XIII confirming this appointment on 16 May 1768.

Emmerich Joseph von Breidbach zu Bürresheim introduced several reforms during his time as Archbishop of Mainz. The number of holidays was reduced. Schools and monasteries in the archbishopric were modernized to reflect the latest in Enlightenment thinking. Education was removed from the care of the church, and an independent teacher's academy opened on 1 May 1771. In 1773, Pope Clement XIV issued the papal brief Dominus ac Redemptor, resulting in the Suppression of the Society of Jesus and as a result, the Society of Jesus, which had run Mainz's system of higher education, was expelled from the Archbishopric of Mainz.

Emmerich Joseph von Breidbach zu Bürresheim died in Mainz on 11 June 1774 and is buried in Mainz Cathedral.

Catholic Church titles
Preceded by Johann Friedrich Karl von Ostein	Archbishop-Elector of Mainz; 1763–1774	Succeeded by Friedrich Karl Joseph von Erthal
Preceded by Johann Philipp von Walderdorf	Prince-Bishop of Worms; 1768–1774	Succeeded by Friedrich Karl Joseph von Erthal
