= Acts of Roman Congregations =

The Acts of Roman Congregations is a term of the canon law of the Catholic Church, used to designate the documents (called also decrees) issued by the Roman Congregations, in virtue of powers conferred on them by the Roman Pontiff.

== Kinds ==
In virtue of their governing and executive powers, the Congregations grant privileges and dispensations from ecclesiastical laws, or issue ordinances to safeguard their observance; in virtue of their power of interpreting laws, they give authentic declarations; in virtue of their judicial power they give decisions between contending parties. All these powers, however, do not belong to each Congregation.

Again, their decrees are particular or universal, according as they are directed to individuals or to the whole Church. Particular decrees, containing simply an authentic interpretation of a universal law, are called equivalently universal. Finally, most decrees are disciplinary, dealing with positive ecclesiastical laws, which they explain, or enforce, or dispense from; but some are doctrinal, e.g., those that declare a doctrine untenable, or an act unlawful because it's contrary to a divine law.

== Authority ==
The authority of these decrees is in a certain sense supreme, inasmuch as they come from the highest ecclesiastical tribunals; but it is not absolutely supreme, for the Congregations are juridically distinct from the Pope and inferior to him; hence their acts are not, strictly speaking, acts of the Roman Pontiff. The Congregations do not always make use of all the authority they possess. Hence it is from the wording of the documents, and by applying the general rules of interpretation, that one must judge in each case of the legal force of their decrees, whether they contain, for instance, orders or instructions, authentic interpretations, or only practical directions.

Doctrinal decrees are not of themselves infallible; the prerogative of infallibility cannot be communicated to the Congregations by the Pope. On the other hand, owing to the teaching power delegated to the Congregations for safeguarding the purity of Christian doctrine, exterior compliance and interior assent are due to such decrees. However, solid proofs to the contrary may at times justify the learned in suspending their assent until the infallible authority of the Church intervenes.

Universal decrees bind either all the faithful, or such classes or persons as are directly concerned. Particular decrees affect, first of all, those to whom they are directed. A decree that grants a privilege or a dispensation affects others only by preventing them from disturbing the recipients. A particular decree containing a judicial sentence has not the force of a universal law, unless the same decision has been given repeatedly in similar cases, because such decisions rendered by courts that are supreme form a judicial custom, to which inferior judges must conform (1. 38. D. de legibus). Finally, when particular decrees are equivalently universal, canonists are divided as to the limits of their binding force.

Most authors distinguish between comprehensive and extensive interpretations. The latter are held to bind only persons to whom they are directed, unless promulgated to the Universal Church, because, being extensive, they enforce a sense not included in the law and are equivalent to a new law; the former are held to bind all without need of promulgation, because the sense explained in a comprehensive interpretation being already included in the law, such decrees are not new laws and do not need further promulgation. Many canonists follow an opposite view; without distinguishing between comprehensive and extensive interpretations, they maintain that any decree interpreting a law in itself obscure and doubtful binds only those to whom it is directed, unless promulgated to the Universal Church. They base their opinion upon the doctrine that, when a law is in itself doubtful and obscure an authentic interpretation, i.e., a declaration obliging people to put that law into practice in a certain definite sense, is equivalent to a new law; hence the necessity of its promulgation. These authors, however, admit that no promulgation is necessary, either when the same declaration has been repeatedly given, so as to have established what is termed the Stylus Curiae (a custom similar to that mentioned above in connection with the authority of judicial sentences), or when the declaration in question, though given only once, has been universally accepted, so as to have become the common practice of the Church.

== Post-1917 (Jus Codicis) ==
On 15 September 1917, by the motu proprio Cum Iuris Canonici, Pope Benedict XV made provision for a Pontifical Commission charged with interpreting the 1917 Code of Canon Law and making any necessary modifications as later legislation was issued. New laws would be appended to existing canons in new paragraphs or inserted between canons, repeating the number of the previous canon and adding bis, ter, etc. (e.g. "canon 1567bis" in the style of the civil law) so as not to subvert the ordering of the code, or the existing text of a canon would be completely supplanted. The numbering of the canons was not to be altered.

The Roman Congregations were forbidden to issue new general decrees, unless it was necessary, and then only after consulting the Pontifical Commission charged with amending the code. The congregations were instead to issue Instructions on the canons of the code, and to make it clear that they were elucidating particular canons of the code. This was done so as not to make the code obsolete soon after it was promulgated. The 1917 Code was very rarely amended, and then only slightly.

== Use ==
Their use is determined by their special character and value, according as they are sentences, or declarations and so forth. Moreover, besides settling the cases for which they are issued, they are often useful for professors of canon law and moral theology in discussing disputed questions, as well as for judges in the prudent administration of justice; on the other hand, all, especially clerics, may find, even in those that are not universal, safe directions in matters of religion and morality. This directive effect is all the more reasonable as these acts come from men of learning and experience, well qualified for their offices, who devote the most careful study to each case, according to its relative importance.

Decisions of lesser moment are given by the cardinal who is at the head of the Congregation, in a meeting (congresso) composed of the same cardinal, the secretary, and some other officials of the Congregation. More important matters are decided only by the general Congregation. Before the Congregation meets to take action in affairs of major importance, each cardinal has been fully informed of the question to be treated, by means of a paper in which the matter is thoroughly discussed, and all points of fact and law connected with it are presented, with reasons for both sides. The cardinals then discuss the matter in their meeting, and the decision is reached by voting. These decisions are brought to the Pope for his consideration or approbation in all cases in which custom or law prescribes such procedure. Ordinarily this approval is not legally of such a character as to make these decrees "pontifical acts"; they become such only by the special confirmation, termed by canonists in forma specificâ, which is seldom given. Finally, the act is drawn up in due form, and, having been sealed and signed by the Cardinal Prefect of the Congregation and the Secretary, is dispatched to its destination.

== Manner of preservation ==
All pending affairs are entered, under progressive numbers, in the register called Protocollo, with a short indication of the stage of the transaction. Suitable alphabetical indexes render easy the work of looking up details. All the documents relating to each case, from the first, containing the petition addressed to the Congregation, to the official copy of the final act, and forming what is technically called the posizione, are kept together, separate from all other documents, and are preserved in the archives of the Congregation, either permanently or for a definite period of time (ordinarily, ten years), when the documents are removed to the Vatican archives. This latter practice prevails in the Congregations of the Council, of Bishops and Regulars, and of Rites.

== Accessibility ==
The archives of the Congregations are not opened to the public. If one wishes to study the documents, he should ask permission from the authorities of the Congregations. Ordinarily it is sufficient to ask it of the secretary; in the Congregations of Propaganda and of the Index the petition should be addressed to the Cardinal Prefect, and in the Congregation of the Holy Office, to the Congregation itself; finally, in the Congregation of Extraordinary Ecclesiastical Affairs, the matter has to be referred to the Pope. When there are sufficient reasons, which should be more or less grave according to the quality of the matter, the petitioner either will be allowed to inspect the original documents or will be supplied with authentic copies.

== Collections ==
Many of the acts are accessible in the various collections, which several of the Congregations have permitted to be published. Some of these collections are also authentic, inasmuch as their genuineness and authenticity are vouched for by the authorities of the Congregations. Moreover, editors of periodicals on ecclesiastical subjects have been allowed for several years back to publish in their magazines the acts of the Congregations, and one of these periodicals, Acta Sanctae Sedis, received the privilege of being declared "authentic and official for publishing the acts of the Apostolic See" (S.C. de Prop. Fid., 23 May 1904). The following is a list of major collections:

- Collectanea S. Congr. de Propaganda Fide (Rome, 1893);
- Thesaurus Resolutionum S. Congr. Concilii (Rome, 1718);
- Zamboni, Collectio Declarationum S.C. Concilii (Arras, 1860);
- Pallottini, Collectio Conclusionum et Resolutionum S.C. Concilii (Rome, 1868–93);
- Lingen et Reuss, Causae Selectae, in S.C. Concilii Propositae (New York, 1871);
- Bizzarri, Collectanea S. Congr. Episcoporum et Regularium (Rome, 1885);
- Decreta authentica C. Sacrorum Rituum (Rome, 1898–1901);
- Decreta authentica S. Congr. Indulgentiis Sacrisque Reliquiis praepositae (New York, 1883);
- Schneider, Rescripta authentica S.C. Indulgentiis Sacrisque Reliquiis praepositae (Ratisbon, 1885);
- Ricci, Synopsis Decretorum et Resolutionum S. Congr. Immunitatis (Turin, 1719).

Among the Catholic periodicals that published regularly the acts of the Congregations were the following (the date after the title indicates the first year of publication):

- Archiv für Kathol. Kirchenrecht (1857);
- Analecta Juris Pontificii (Rome, 1855), since 1893, Analecta Ecclesiastica;
- Le Canoniste Contemporain (Paris, 1893);
- American Ecclesiastical Review (New York, 1889);
- Irish Ecclesiastical Record (Dublin, 1864);
- Nouvelle Revue Théologique (Tournay, 1869);
- Acta Sanctae Sedis (Rome, 1865);
- Monitore Ecclesiastico (Rome, 1876)
