= Ton (river) =

River in Belgium and France

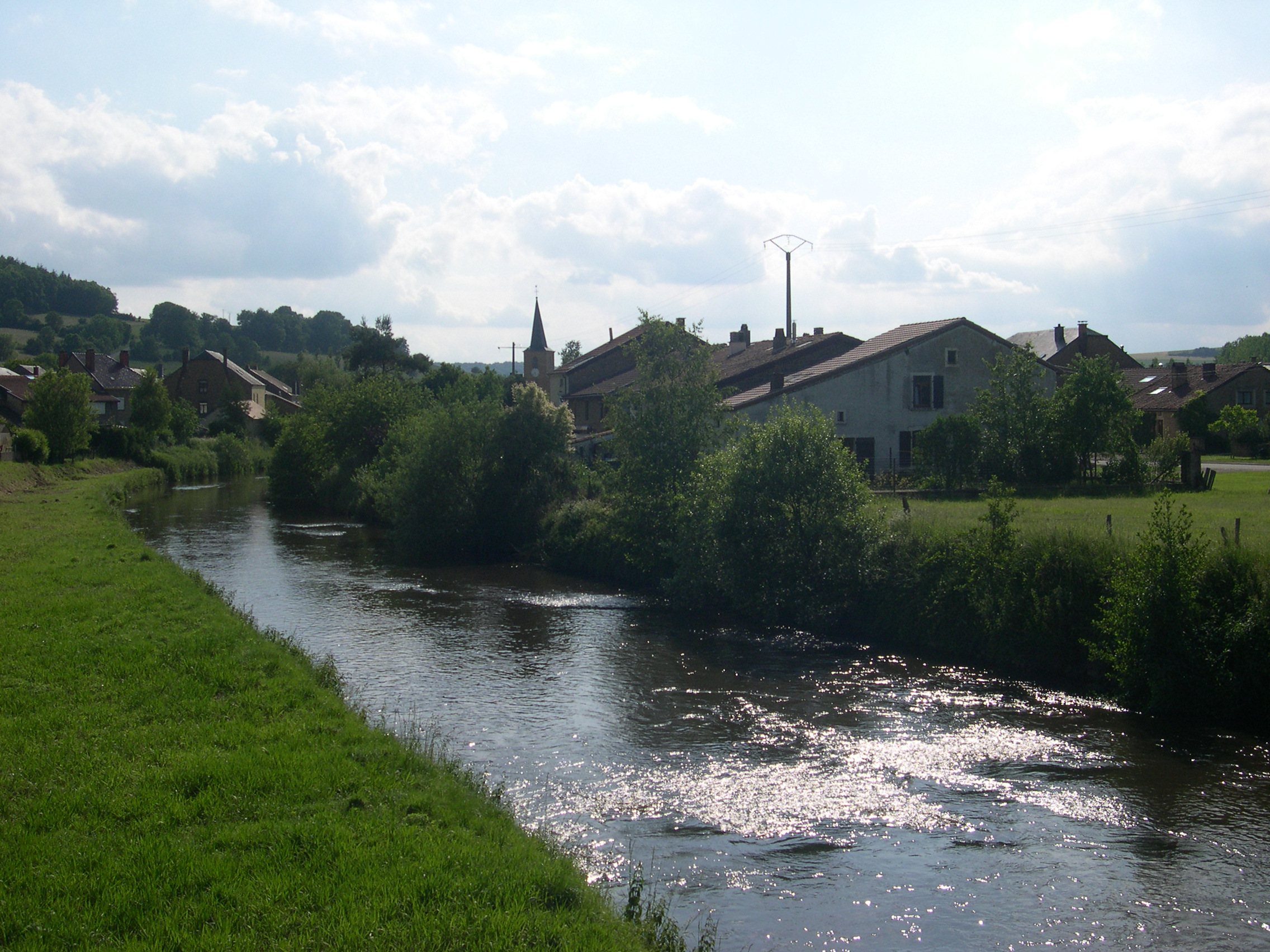
- Ton as seen from the bridge on Rue du Régnier in Lamorteau

- Location within Belgium

Location
- Country: Belgium, France

Physical characteristics
- Mouth
  - location: Chiers
  - coordinates: 49°31′04″N 5°26′50″E
- Length: 32 km (20 mi)

Basin features
- Progression: Chiers→ Meuse→ North Sea

The Ton (also: Thon) is a river in southern Belgium and northeastern France, a right tributary of Chiers. It flows through the town Virton, forms part of the Belgium–France border, and flows into the Chiers near Écouviez.
