= Confederation of the Rhine =

Napoleonic union of German client states

Coordinates: 50°6′54″N 8°40′48″E

Confederated States of the Rhine Rheinische Bundesstaaten (German) États confédérés du Rhin (French)
- 1806–1813
- The Confederation of the Rhine in 1812
- Status: Confederation of client states of the French Empire
- Capital: Free City of Frankfurt
- Official languages: German; French
- Common languages: Bavarian; Central German; Low German; Sinte Romani; Yiddish
- Religion: Catholicism; Protestantism; Judaism
- Demonym: Rhenish
- Protector of the Confederation of the Rhine
  - 1806–1813: Napoleon
- Prince-primate
  - 1806–1813: Karl Theodor Anton Maria von Dalberg
- Legislature: Diet
- Historical era: Napoleonic Wars
  - Treaty of the Confederation of the Rhine: 12 July 1806
  - Francis II, Holy Roman Emperor dissolves the Holy Roman Empire: 6 August 1806
  - Battle of Leipzig: 19 October 1813

Area
  - Total: 325.700 km^{2} (125.753 sq mi)
- Currency: Various, including: Conventionsthaler; North German thaler South German gulden French franc
Preceded by	Succeeded by
Holy Roman Empire	German Confederation
- Today part of: Germany; Liechtenstein; Austria

The Confederated States of the Rhine, (Note: German: Rheinische Bundesstaaten; French: États confédérés du Rhin) simply known as the Confederation of the Rhine (Note: German: Rheinbund; French: Confédération du Rhin) or Rhine Confederation, was a confederation of German client states established at the behest of Napoleon (like his later establishments like Westphalia and Warsaw) some months after he defeated the Austrians and the Russians at the Battle of Austerlitz. Its creation brought about the dissolution of the Holy Roman Empire shortly afterward. The Confederation of the Rhine lasted for only seven years, from 1806 to 1813, dissolving after Napoleon's defeat in the Battle of Leipzig.

The founding members of the confederation were German princes of the Holy Roman Empire. They were later joined by 19 others, altogether ruling over a total of over 14.5 to 15 million people. This granted a significant strategic advantage to the French Empire on its eastern frontier by providing a buffer between France and the two largest German states, Prussia and Austria (which also controlled substantial non-German lands).

== Background ==
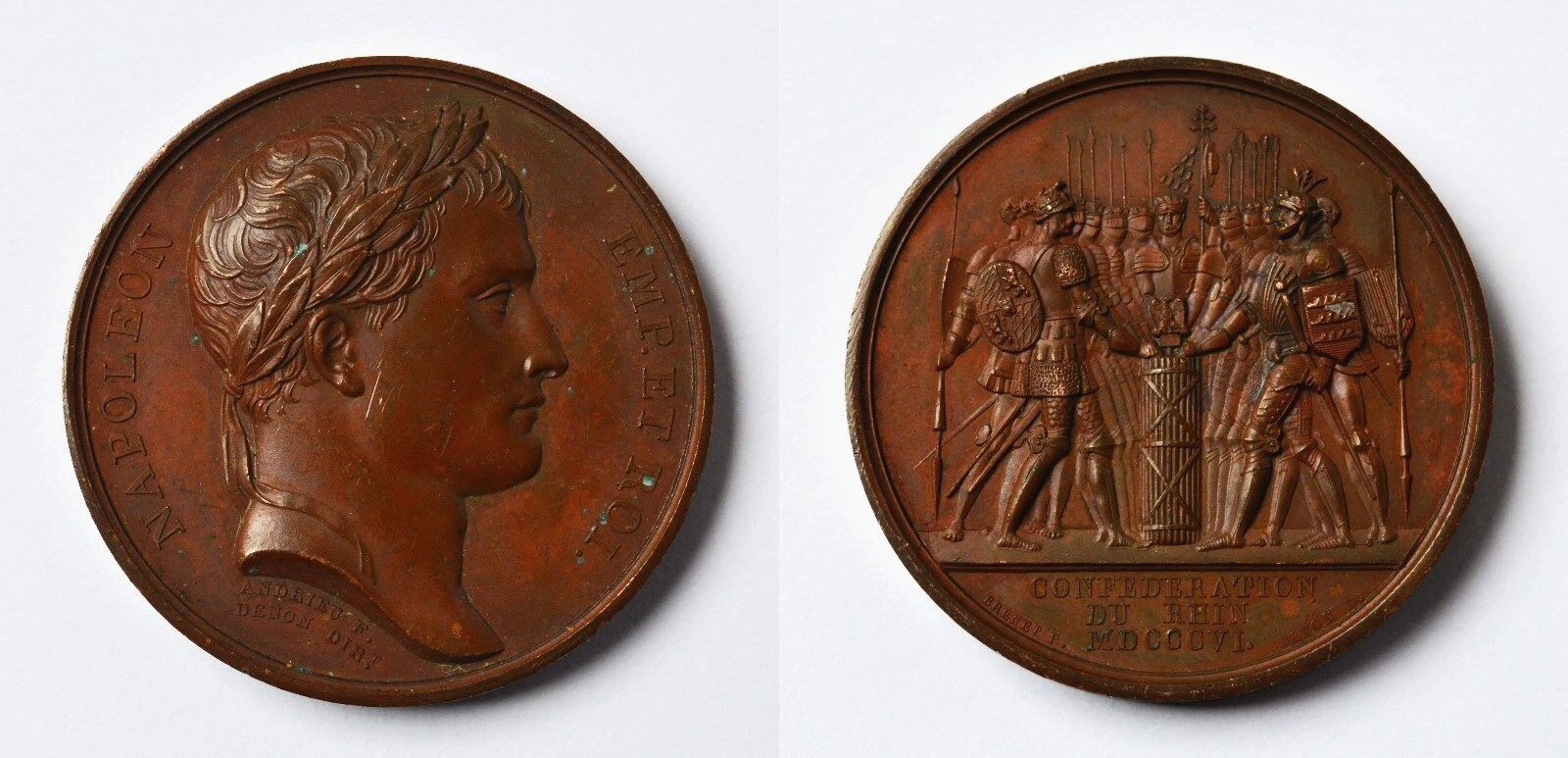
Medal celebrating the creation of the Confederation

After the Treaty of Lunéville, which saw the annexation of the German territories of the left bank of the Rhine occupied by France, a new order of Central European states was established. The Final Imperial Recess of 1803 led to a radical transformation within the Holy Roman Empire. Some 112 immediate territories east of the Rhine were absorbed by larger states. Over three million people were affected by this change. All ecclesiastical territories save one were secularised and most free imperial cities underwent mediatisation. Besides Prussia, the Electorate of Baden and the Electorate of Württemberg benefited the most from these changes. The disappearance of ecclesiastical territories meant the Holy Roman Emperor lost important political support. The end of the crippled Holy Roman Empire was foreseeable. Francis II, Holy Roman Emperor took the title of Emperor of Austria in 1804 to counter the loss of prestige. When the War of the Third Coalition broke out in 1805, with Russia, Austria and Great Britain on the one side and France on the other, Bavaria, Baden and Wurttemberg allied with Napoleon.

After the victory at Austerlitz and the resultant Peace of Pressburg in 1805, Napoleon could significantly reassert his position in the German states. Furthermore, Austria had to concede territory and Napoleon named his brothers Joseph and Louis kings of Naples and Holland, respectively, and his brother-in-law Joachim Murat, Grand Duke of Berg. He also worked toward establishing an alliance with Baden, Bavaria and Württemberg. Francis II had to assent to the elevation of both Bavaria and Württemberg to the rank of kingdom and Baden, Hesse-Darmstadt and Berg to that of grand duchy. With French encouragement, the vestiges of small Imperial estates in the region were annexed. This reorganisation of the right bank of the Rhine laid the groundwork for the Confederation of the Rhine.

== Formation ==
Chart for the structure of the Confederation as projected in 1806

The formation of the Confederation of the Rhine was not altogether a voluntary option for its future member states. Negotiations between France and the princes who had been selected by Napoleon to be members of the future alliance had been dragging on for the first six months of 1806, when Napoleon decided to rush things. On 12 July, the Paris envoys of the various princes were summoned to the Ministry of Foreign Affairs to find themselves instructed by Talleyrand to sign the treaty of the new alliance, whose terms had been decided between him and Napoleon. This caused consternation among the envoys, given that the terms were far more onerous for the princes than what had been expected. They all protested that they were not empowered to sign before their masters authorised them to do so, but Talleyrand compelled them to sign then and there and so they did under duress. King Maximilian I Joseph of Bavaria, who alone among the princes had been sent a copy of the proposed treaty, was aghast. Among other things, Bavaria would lose control of its foreign policy, which would now be in the hands of Napoleon, the "Protector of the Confederation". He hurriedly sent Baron Karl von Gravenreuth to Paris with instructions to reject a confederation which he said gave to the Protector a power "more extensive than the Emperor of Germany ever had". Von Gravenreuth was detained long enough at the French border so that when he finally arrived in Paris, all the other princes had signed. He therefore found it inadvisable to deliver the King's views on the matter. In the words of Enno E. Kraehe: "Only by such crude methods was Napoleon able at last to found the Confederation of the Rhine".

On signing the Treaty of the Confederation of the Rhine (German: Rheinbundakte), 16 German states joined in a loose Confederation of sovereign states (the treaty called it the États confédérés du Rhin). The "Protector of the Confederation" was a hereditary office of the Emperor of the French, Napoleon. On 1 August 1806, as the treaty compelled them to do, the members of the confederation formally seceded from the Holy Roman Empire, and on 6 August, following an ultimatum by Napoleon, Francis II, Holy Roman Emperor, who had already proclaimed himself Emperor of Austria in 1804, declared the Holy Roman Empire dissolved.

== System ==
According to the treaty, the confederation was to be run by common constitutional bodies, but the individual states (in particular the larger ones) wanted unlimited sovereignty. Instead of a monarchical head of state, as the Holy Roman Emperor had been, its highest office was held by Karl Theodor von Dalberg, the former Archchancellor, who now bore the title of a Prince-primate of the confederation. As such, he was President of the College of Kings and presided over the Diet of the Confederation, designed to be a parliament-like body although it never actually assembled. The President of the Council of the Princes was Frederick Augustus, Duke of Nassau.

In return for their support of Napoleon, some rulers were given higher statuses: Baden, Hesse, Cleves, and Berg were made into grand duchies, and Württemberg and Bavaria became kingdoms. Several member states were also enlarged with the absorption of the territories of Imperial counts and knights who were mediatised at that time. They had to pay a very high price for their new status, however. The Confederation was above all a military alliance; the member states had to maintain substantial armies for mutual defense and supply France with large numbers of military personnel. As events played out, the members of the confederation found themselves more subordinated to Napoleon than they had been to the Habsburgs when they were within the Holy Roman Empire. In order to add luster to his newly founded dynasty, the French Emperor pressed hard to arrange a marriage between his stepson Eugène de Beauharnais and Princess Augusta of Bavaria. Napoleon had already contemplated marrying Beauharnais to a Wittelsbach princess in 1804, but it was only in 1806, following his elevation to the status of king, that Max Joseph gave in to Napoleon's pressure. Other royal marriages were arranged between Stéphanie de Beauharnais and Charles, Grand Duke of Baden and Jérôme Bonaparte and Catharina of Württemberg.

After Prussia lost to France in 1806, Napoleon cajoled most of the secondary states of Germany into the Confederation of the Rhine. Eventually, an additional 23 German states joined the Confederation. It was at its largest in 1808, when it included 36 states — four kingdoms, five grand duchies, 13 duchies, seventeen principalities, and the Free Hansa towns of Hamburg, Lübeck, and Bremen. The west bank of the Rhine and the Principality of Erfurt had been annexed outright by the French Empire. Thus, as either emperor of the French or protector of the Confederation of the Rhine, Napoleon was now the overlord of all of Germany, including Tyrol, except Austria, Prussia, Danish Holstein, and Swedish Pomerania, plus previously independent Switzerland, which were not included in the Confederation.

In 1810, large parts of what is now northwest Germany were quickly annexed to France in order to better monitor the trade embargo with Great Britain, the Continental System.

The Confederation of the Rhine collapsed in 1813, in the aftermath of Napoleon's failed invasion of Russia. Many of its members changed sides after the Battle of Leipzig, when it became apparent Napoleon would lose the War of the Sixth Coalition.

== Types of states within the Confederation ==
Both French influence and internal autonomy varied greatly throughout the confederation's existence. There was also a great variation between the power and influence of the individual states. There are three basic types:

- The first group formed the "Model States", which were mostly ruled by relatives of Napoleon. These include the Kingdom of Westphalia under Jérôme Bonaparte. The Grand Duchy of Berg was first administered by Joachim Murat before he was appointed King of Naples in 1808, and then by Napoleon himself. The third model state was the Grand Duchy of Frankfurt, which was run by the house of Dalberg until 1813. Because of the collapse of the Napoleonic supremacy, this position could no longer justify its own existence. These new foundations were intended to serve as a model for the remaining Rhine federal states through their legal and social policies, such as the Napoleonic Code;
- The second group were the reform states of Bavaria, Württemberg, Baden, and Hesse-Darmstadt. These were not dependent areas but in many ways Napoleon's true allies. Although these states took inspiration from the French model, they also went their own way. The historian Lothar Gall suggested that the rulers of the Confederation of the Rhine were made revolutionaries by Napoleon himself. Opposition to the emperor would have been possible only by renouncing the power that he had given to them. "He had not made satellites which were politically incapable of action and forced to be obedient through use of force, but real allies who followed in his well-understood policy reasons of state";
- A third group formed the states that joined after 1806. These included the numerous smaller northern and central German territories, except for Saxony. In these, the internal changes were minimal. The reforms remained significantly limited in these states. However, there were also considerable differences among these states. In Mecklenburg and Saxony, the old structures remained almost unchanged. In the Duchy of Nassau, on the other hand, Minister Ernst Franz Ludwig Marschall von Bieberstein ensured moderate administrative modernisation and the introduction of religious tolerance.

== Member monarchies ==
The following table shows the members of the confederation, with their date of joining, as well as the number of troops provided, listed in parentheses.

Member states of the Confederation of the Rhine

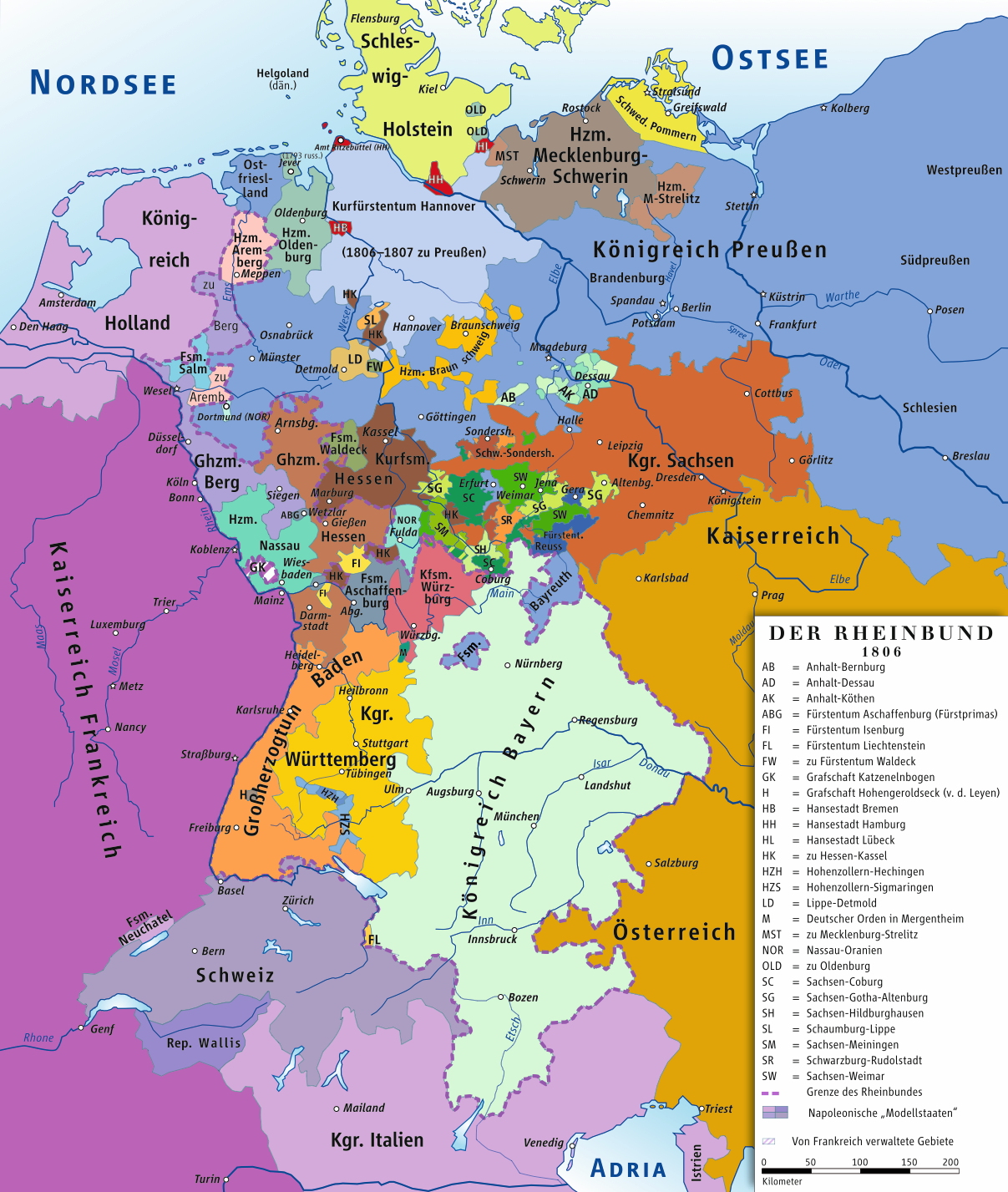
1806

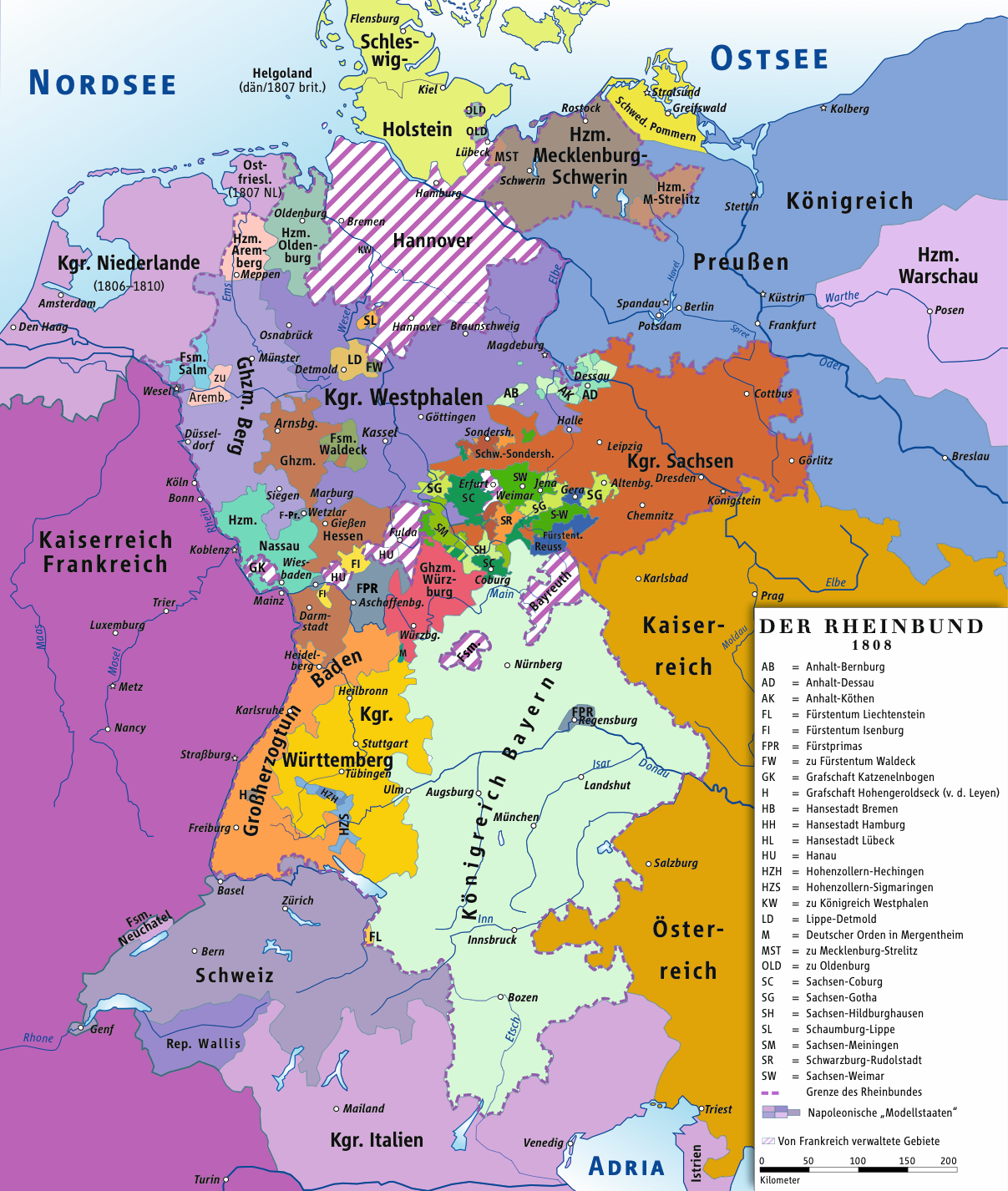
1808 (greatest extent)

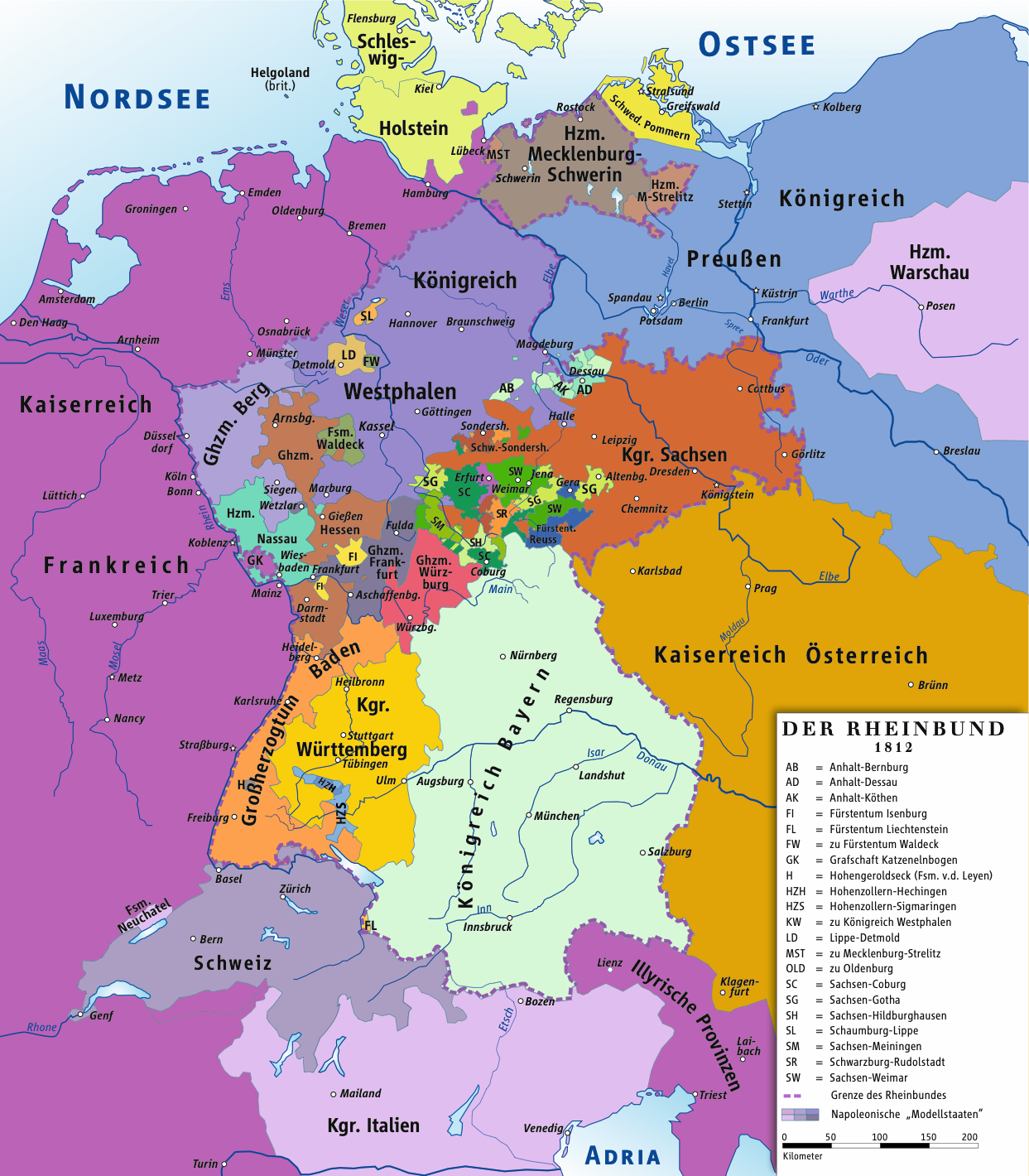
1812

=== College of Kings ===
Member monarchy	Year joined	Notes and troop count
Grand Duchy of Baden	12 Jul 1806	Co-founder; former margraviate-electorate (8,000)
Kingdom of Bavaria	12 Jul 1806	Co-founder; former duchy-electorate (30,000)
Grand Duchy of Berg	12 Jul 1806	Co-founder; absorbed Cleves, both formerly Duchies (5,000)
Grand Duchy of Hesse-Darmstadt	12 Jul 1806	Co-founder; former landgraviate (4,000)
Principality of Regensburg	12 Jul 1806	Co-founder; in personal union with Principality of Aschaffenburg; formerly Prince-Archbishopric and Electorate; after 1810 the Grand Duchy of Frankfurt (968)
Kingdom of Saxony	11 Dec 1806	Former duchy-electorate (20,000)
Kingdom of Westphalia	15 Nov 1807	Napoleonic creation (25,000)
Kingdom of Württemberg	12 Jul 1806	Co-founder; former duchy-electorate (12,000)
Grand Duchy of Würzburg	23 Sep 1806	Napoleonic creation for former Grand duke of Tuscany and Elector of Salzburg (2,000)

=== College of Princes ===
Member monarchy	Year joined	Notes and troop count
Duchy of Anhalt-Bernburg	11 Apr 1807	(240)
Duchy of Anhalt-Dessau	11 Apr 1807	(350)
Duchy of Anhalt-Köthen	11 Apr 1807	(210)
Duchy of Arenberg	12 Jul 1806	Co-founder; mediatised on 13 December 1810 (379)
Principality of Hohenzollern-Hechingen	12 Jul 1806	Co-founder (97)
Principality of Hohenzollern-Sigmaringen	12 Jul 1806	Co-founder (193)
Principality of Isenburg	12 Jul 1806	Co-founder (291)
Principality of Leyen	12 Jul 1806	Co-founder; former countship or graviate (29)
Principality of Liechtenstein	12 Jul 1806	Co-founder (40)
Principality of Lippe-Detmold	11 Apr 1807	(500)
Duchy of Mecklenburg-Schwerin	22 Mar 1808	(1,900)
Duchy of Mecklenburg-Strelitz	18 Feb 1808	(400)
Duchy of Nassau	12 Jul 1806*	Union of Nassau-Usingen and Nassau-Weilburg, both co-founders (1,680)
Duchy of Oldenburg	14 Oct 1808	Annexed by France on 13 December 1810 (800)
Principality of Pyrmont	18 Apr 1807	(400)
Principality of Reuss-Ebersdorf	11 Apr 1807	(100)
Principality of Reuss-Greiz	11 Apr 1807	(117)
Principality of Reuss-Lobenstein	11 Apr 1807	(108)
Principality of Reuss-Schleiz	11 Apr 1807	(125)
Principality of Salm	25 Jul 1806	Union of Salm-Salm and Salm-Kyrburg, both co-founders; annexed by France on 13 December 1810 (323)
Duchy of Saxe-Coburg	15 Dec 1806	(400)
Duchy of Saxe-Gotha	15 Dec 1806	(1,100)
Duchy of Saxe-Hildburghausen	15 Dec 1806	(200)
Duchy of Saxe-Meiningen	15 Dec 1806	(300)
Duchy of Saxe-Weimar	15 Dec 1806	(800)
Principality of Schaumburg-Lippe	11 Apr 1807	(150)
Principality of Schwarzburg-Rudolstadt	11 Apr 1807	(325)
Principality of Schwarzburg-Sondershausen	11 Apr 1807	(325)
Principality of Waldeck	18 Apr 1807	

== Aftermath ==
The allies opposing Napoleon dissolved the Confederation of the Rhine on 4 November 1813. After its demise, the only attempt at political coordination in Germany until the creation on 8 June 1815 of the German Confederation was a body called the Central Administration Council (German: Zentralverwaltungsrat); its president was Heinrich Friedrich Karl Reichsfreiherr vom und zum Stein (1757–1831). The German Confederation was later dissolved on 23 August 1866.

On 30 May 1814, the Treaty of Paris declared the German states independent.

In 1814–1815, the Congress of Vienna redrew the continent's political map. Napoleonic creations such as the huge Kingdom of Westphalia, the Grand Duchy of Berg and the Duchy of Würzburg were abolished; suppressed states, including Hanover, the Duchy of Brunswick, Hesse-Kassel and Oldenburg, were reinstated. On the other hand, most members of the Confederation of the Rhine located in central and southern Germany survived with minor border changes. They, along with the reinstated states, Prussia, and Austria, formed the German Confederation.

== See also ==
- History of Germany
- League of the Rhine
- List of French possessions and colonies
- List of German monarchs
- West Germany
