= Prince-primate =

Title held by individual (prince-)archbishops

Prince-primate (German: Fürstprimas, Hungarian: hercegprímás) is a rare princely title held by individual (prince-) archbishops of specific sees in a presiding capacity in an august assembly of mainly secular princes, notably the following:

== Germany - Confederation of the Rhine ==
The Rheinbund or 'Confederation of the Rhine' was founded in 1806, when several German states seceded from the Holy Roman Empire and allied themselves with Emperor Napoleon of France, who assumed the position of the Protector of the Confederation of the Rhine. Its highest office was held by Karl Theodor von Dalberg, first Archbishop of Mainz and then of Regensburg. He had been the first among the princes of the Holy Roman Empire and styled its Archchancellor, and as such was given the first rank among the princes of the new Confederation and the title of Fürstprimas, 'Prince Primate'. As such he presided over the College of Kings and the Diet of the Confederation, a senate-like assembly which never actually assembled.

During his term as prince-primate, Dalberg was Archbishop of Regensburg (in Bavaria) and at first Fürst (ruling prince) of Aschaffenburg. From September 19, 1806, his territories included the former Reichsstadt and on February 16, 1810, Dalberg was promoted to the strictly secular rank of Grand Duke of Frankfurt, in chief of another former Reichsstadt (on the lower Main, enclaved in the Electorate of Mainz, now in Hessen). At the same time, Napoleon appointed his stepson Eugène de Beauharnais — excluded from the French imperial succession — as heir to the Grand Duchy.

On the eve of the collapse of the First French Empire, Dalberg resigned his secular positions and Beauharnais succeeded him as Grand Duke, though this had no practical effect, as the dissolution of the Confederation (carved up into a revised set of monarchies) also rendered the position moot.

== Hungary ==
In virtue of his dignity as primate of the Habsburg dynasty's apostolic Kingdom of Hungary, the Archbishop of Esztergom enjoyed extraordinary privileges, resulting in his being titled prince primate.

The primate was entitled to hold national synods, was Legatus Natus of the Holy Roman Church, and therefore had the right, inside of his legation (territory where he represented the Pope), to have the cross carried before him, dealt directly with Rome and had the right of visitation in the episcopal sees and the religious houses in Hungary, except the exempt Archabbey of Pannonhalma (S. Martinus in Monte Pannoniæ).

Since 1715, the primate had also been a Reichsfürst, a ruling prince of the Holy Roman Empire, entitled Prince Primate. He was the chief and privy chancellor of the Hungarian kingdom, and thus keeper of the great seal. Formerly he was also a member of the supreme court, and still earlier governor, viceroy and főispán ('hereditary' lord-lieutenant) of Esztergom county. To the primate also belonged the right (delegated regalia) to superintend the royal mint at Kremnica (German: Kremnitz, Hungarian: Körmöcbánya), for which he received a significant sum from its seigniorage revenues, called jus piseti ('right of'). By ancient custom, he had the right to crown the King of Hungary and anoint the queen. By a gift of archiepiscopal property he was at one time able to confer nobility (Prädialadel), another rarely delegated princely prerogative (usually only knighting was allowed to non-sovereign nobility). Another privilege was his right to take an oath before a court of justice through his deputy, and not personally.

The primate was also chief priest and chancellor of the Hungarian national Order of St. Stephen, established in 1764. As first banneret (baro regni) of Hungary, he was a Magnate, i.e. member of the Upper House.

== Sources ==
- Westermann, Großer Atlas zur Weltgeschichte (in German)
- WorldStatesmen - here Frankfurt, see also other parties mentioned
