= Karl Theodor Anton Maria von Dalberg =

German archbishop of Mainz, later of Regensburg (1744–1817)

- Elector of Mainz; Arch-Chancellor of the Holy Roman Empire; Prince of Regensburg; Prince-Primate of the Confederation of the Rhine; Grand Duke of Frankfurt
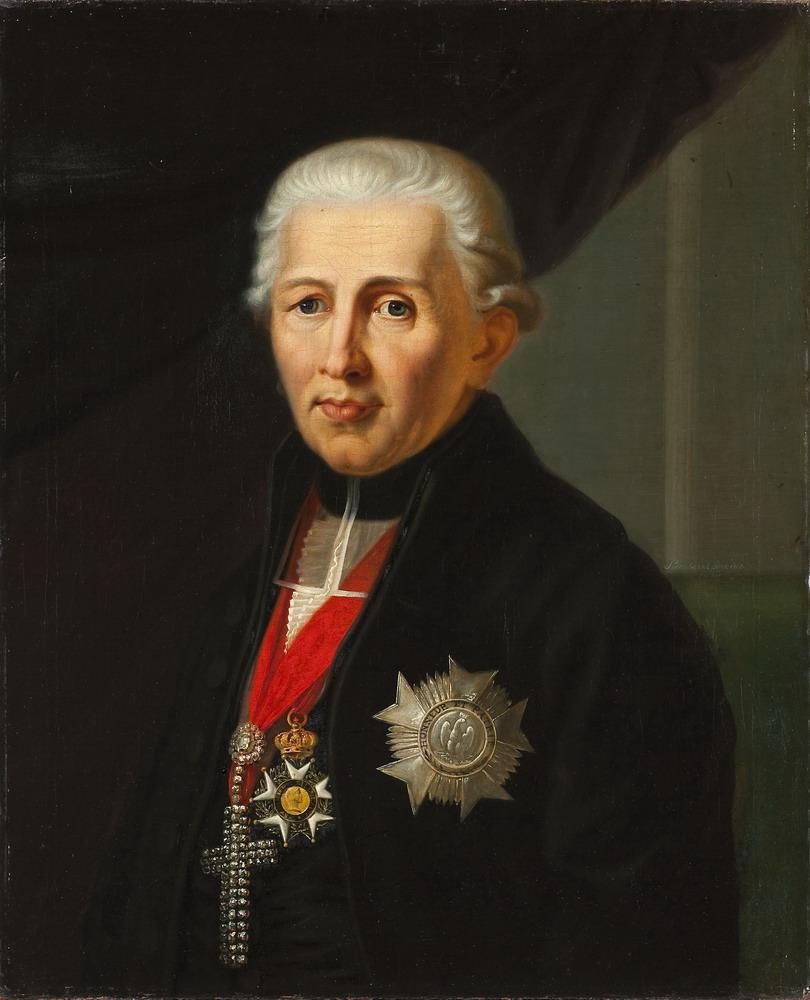
- Portrait of Karl Theodor von Dalberg by Franz Stirnbrand, 1812
- Other posts: Prince-Bishop of Worms (1787–1817); Bishop of Konstanz (1788–1817); Bishop of Regensburg (1805–1817)
- Previous post: Titular Archbishop of Tarsus (1788–1800)

Orders
- Ordination: 3 February 1788
- Consecration: 31 August 1788 by Friedrich Karl Joseph von Erthal

Personal details
- Born: 8 February 1744 Mannheim, Electoral Palatinate, Holy Roman Empire
- Died: 10 February 1817 (aged 73) Regensburg, Kingdom of Bavaria
- Denomination: Roman Catholic

- Coat of arms

Karl Theodor Anton Maria von Dalberg (8 February 1744 – 10 February 1817) was a Catholic German bishop and statesman. In various capacities, he served as Archbishop of Mainz, Prince of Regensburg, Arch-Chancellor of the Holy Roman Empire, Bishop of Constance and Worms, Prince-Primate of the Confederation of the Rhine and Grand Duke of Frankfurt. Dalberg was the last Archbishop-Elector of Mainz.

== Early life and career ==
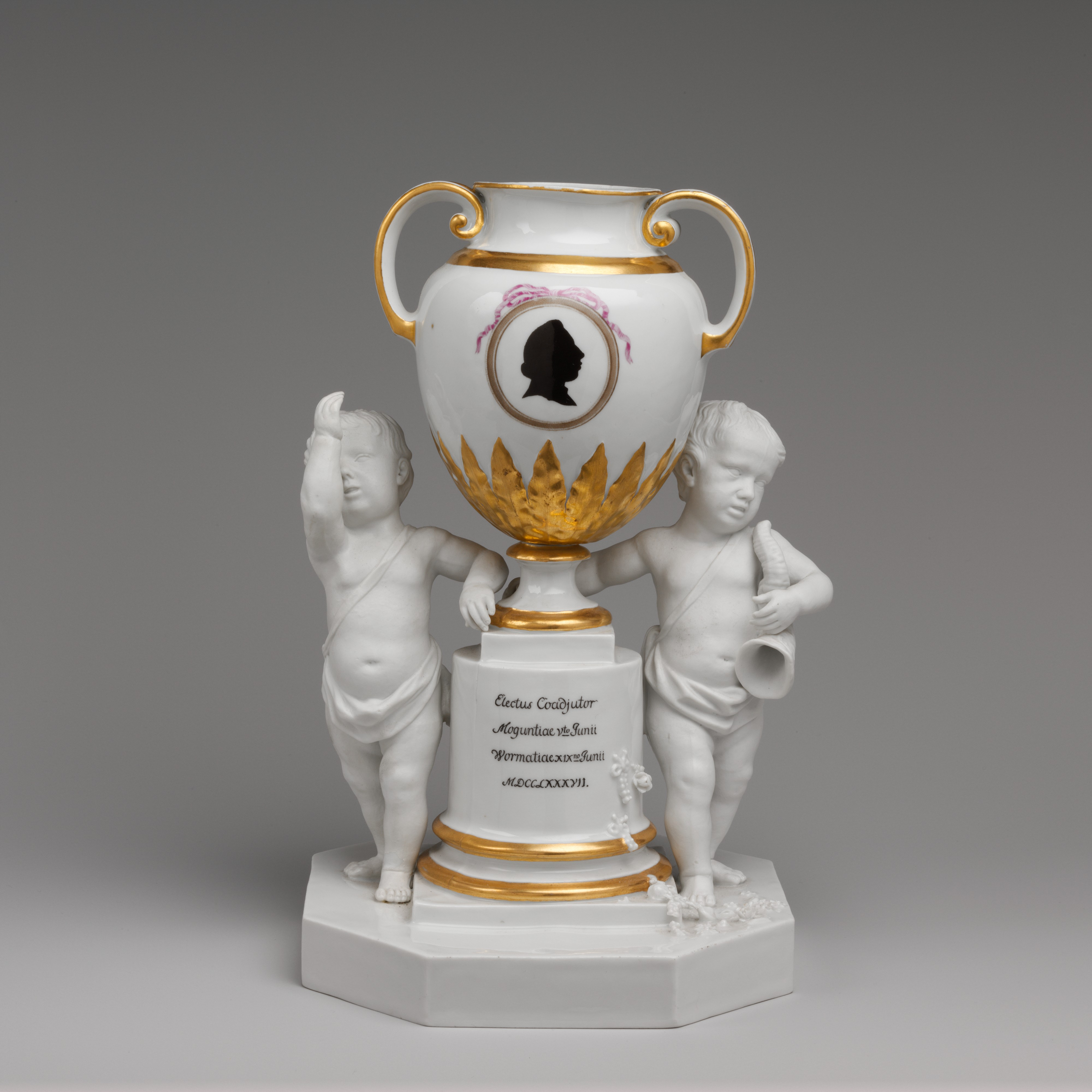
Fürstenberg vase commemorating Dalberg's election in 1787 as Coadjutor of Mainz and Worms (Collections of the Metropolitan Museum of Art)

Born in Mannheim, as a member of the House of Dalberg, he was the son of Franz Heinrich von Dalberg (1716–1776), administrator of Worms and one of the chief counsellors of the Prince-elector and Archbishop of Mainz, and his wife, Baroness Maria Sophie Anna von Eltz-Kempenich (1722–1763). Karl devoted himself to the study of canon law, and entered the church. At the beginning of 1765 he entered the administrative service of the ministry in Mainz.

Having been appointed in 1772 governor of Erfurt, he won further advancement by his successful administration. He was rector of the cathedral school in Würzburg in 1780.

In 1787 he was elected coadjutor cum iure successionis of the Archbishopric of Mainz and the Bishopric of Worms, and in 1788 of the Bishopric of Constance; at the same time, he became titular archbishop of Tarsus in Cilicia and was ordained priest (11/11/1787) and bishop (8/31/1788). After succeeding the respective bishops in Constance (1800) and Worms (1802), he also succeeded in Mainz as the last archbishop-elector, albeit temporally only in the electorate's left bank territories and also, de facto, in the pastoral ones as far as the right bank of the Rhine.

As statesman, Dalberg was distinguished by his patriotic attitude, whether in ecclesiastical matters, in which he leaned to the Febronian view of a German national church, or in his efforts to galvanize the atrophied machinery of the Holy Roman Empire into some sort of effective central government of Germany. Failing in this, he turned to the rising star of Napoleon, believing that he had found in him the only force strong enough to save Germany from dissolution.

By the Treaty of Lunéville in 1801, in which all territories on the left bank of the River Rhine were ceded to France, Dalberg's predecessor had to surrender Mainz and Worms; the Concordat of 1801 had reduced Mainz to a simple diocese in the province of Mechelen that conscribed the French department of Mont-Tonnerre (including the city of Worms). For Mainz, Joseph Ludwig Colmar was soon appointed as bishop. (Worms, though it had lost its city, remained an extant diocese on the right bank of the Rhine, so Dalberg could succeed there.)

In the Final Recess of the Extraordinary Imperial Deputation of 1803, it was decided to compensate German princes for their losses to France by distributing the church land among them, so Dalberg lost a couple of territories there (among other things, Constance), though (due to his prominent position of the Arch-Chancellor of the Empire, and perhaps also due to his personality and skilled diplomacy), he would be the only spiritual prince to retain at least some territory for temporal government: the Mainzian lands around Aschaffenburg, the Reichsstadt (Free Imperial City) of Wetzlar (with the rank of a Countship) and the Principality of Regensburg containing the Imperial City, the prince-bishopric, and some independent monasteries. (Regensburg was also where the Imperial Deputation had taken place.) In addition, he was designated Archbishop of the (former Salzburg suffragan) Regensburg, to which (spiritually now) the former Mainz lands on the right bank of the Rhine, and the former Mainzian suffragans were attached.

This was, of course, the decision of a state authority which, in its spiritual part, could not take effect until ratified by the Pope; in any case, Regensburg's bishop, Josef Conrad of Schroffenberg-Mös, was still alive at the time. So, Dalberg did not exercise spiritual authority in the older part of the Regensburg diocese until Bishop Schroffenberg died, at which point he made himself elected vicar capitular of the diocese; finally, on 1 February 1805, he received the papal assent and was Archbishop of Regensburg.

== Prince-Primate of the Confederation of the Rhine ==
After the dissolution of the Holy Roman Empire in 1806, Dalberg together with other princes joined the Confederation of the Rhine. He formally resigned the office of Arch-Chancellor in a letter to Emperor Francis II, and was appointed prince-primate of the Confederation of the Rhine by Napoleon. At that point, the Reichsstadt of Frankfurt was included among his territories. Not long after, Dalberg appointed Napoleon's uncle, Cardinal Fesch, coadjutor in his archdiocese (an action for which he had no canonical rights).

After the Treaty of Schönbrunn (1810), he was elevated by the French to the rank of Grand Duke of Frankfurt. This greatly augmented Dalberg's territories, although he had to cede Regensburg to the Kingdom of Bavaria. As Grand Duke of Frankfurt he ordered all restrictions on the Jews of Frankfurt lifted. This was opposed by the Lutheran town council, until 1811, when Dalberg issued a proclamation ending the requirement that Jews live in the ghetto or pay special taxes.

On 14 January 1806 he performed the wedding of Eugène de Beauharnais, Napoleon's stepson, and the Bavarian Princess Augusta of Bavaria. In 1813 he ceded all his temporal offices (about to be overrun by the Sixth Coalition) to Beauharnais.

== Death and legacy ==
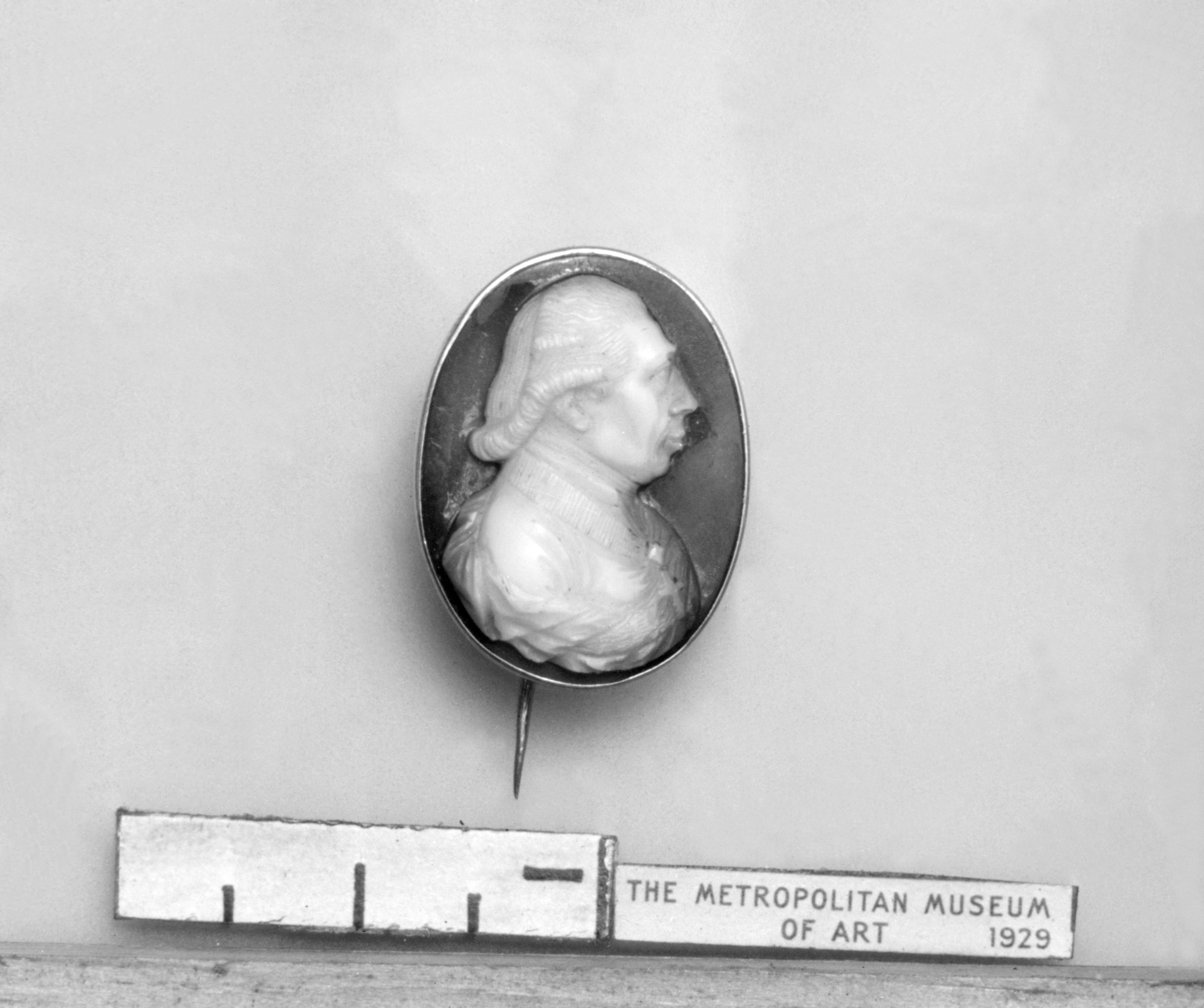
Cameo portrait

Dalberg died in 1817 in Regensburg. Although his political subservience to Napoleon was resented by a later generation in Germany, as a man and prelate he is remembered as amiable, conscientious and large-hearted. Himself a scholar and author, Dalberg was a notable patron of letters, and was the friend of Goethe, Schiller and Wieland.

== Notes ==
Catholic Church titles
Preceded by Maximilian Christof von Rodt as Prince-Bishop	Bishop of Constance; Prince-Bishop until 1803; 1799–1817	Bishopric dissolved^{1}
Preceded by Friedrich Karl Joseph von Erthal	Elector of Mainz, then Regensburg; Arch-Chancellor of Germany; 1802–1806	Holy Roman Empire dissolved, territories mediatised
Preceded by Friedrich Karl Joseph von Erthal	Bishop of Worms; Prince-Bishop until 1803; 1802–1817	Prince-Bishopric secularised, spiritually returned to Mainz
Preceded by Joseph Konrad von Schroffenberg-Mös	Archbishop of Regensburg; Prince-Archbishop until 1810; 1803/05–1817	Vacant Sede vacante Title next held by Johann Nepomuk von Wolf as Bishop of Regensburg
Political offices
Unknown	Kurmainzischer Governor of Erfurt; 1772–1787?	Unknown
Unknown	Coadjutor of Mainz and Worms; 1787–?	Unknown
Unknown	Coadjutor of Constance; 1788–?	Unknown
New creation	Prince-Primate of the Confederation of the Rhine; 1806–1813	Succeeded by Eugène de Beauharnais
New office	Grand Duke of Frankfurt; 1810–1813	Succeeded by Eugène de Beauharnais
Notes and references
1. The Bishopric of Constance was dissolved by Pope Pius VII in 1821, without recognising Ignaz Heinrich von Wessenberg, who had been elected in 1817.
