= List of state leaders in the 19th-century Holy Roman Empire =

This is a list of state leaders in the 19th century from the Holy Roman Empire up to the time of German mediatisation (1801–1806) AD.

== Main ==
- Holy Roman Empire, Kingdom of Germany (complete list, complete list) –

- Francis II, Emperor Elect, King (1792–1806)

== Austria ==
- Archduchy/ Austrian Empire (complete list) –

- Archduke/Emperors (complete list) –

- Francis II, Archduke (1792–1804), Emperor (1804–1835)

- Kingdom of Hungary (complete list) –

- Francis II, King (1792–1835)

- Principality of Auersperg (complete list) –

- Wilhelm I, Prince (1800–1806)

- Prince-Bishopric of Brixen (complete list) –

- Karl Franz Lodron, Prince-bishop (1791–1803)

- Prince-Bishopric of Chur (complete list) –

- Karl Rudolf Graf von Buol-Schauenstein, Prince-bishop (1794–1803)

- Fürstenberg-Fürstenberg (complete list) –

- Charles Joachim, Prince (1796–1804)

- Principality of Heitersheim (complete list) –

- Ignaz Balthasar Rinck von Baldenstein, Prince-prior (1796–1806)

- Liechtenstein (complete list) –

- Aloys I, Prince (1781–1805)
- Johann I Josef, Prince (1805–1836)

- Duchy of Teschen (Cieszyn) (complete list) –

- Albert Casimir, Duke (1766–1822)

- Prince-Bishopric of Trent (complete list) –

- Emmanuel Maria Graf von Thun und Hohenstein, Prince-bishop (1800–1802), Prince (1802–1803)

== Bavarian ==
- Electorate/ Kingdom of Bavaria (complete list) –

- Maximillian IV, Elector (1799–1805), King (1805–1825)

- Berchtesgaden Prince-Provostry (complete list) –

- Joseph Konrad von Schroffenberg-Mös, Prince-provost (1780–1803)

- Saint Emmeram's Abbey (complete list) –

- Coelestin II Steiglehner, Prince-Abbot (1791–1803)

- Prince-Bishopric of Freising (complete list) –

- Joseph Conrad Freiherr von Schroffenberg , Prince-bishop (1790–1802)

- Prince-Abbey of Niedermünster (complete list) –

- Maria Violanta von Lerchenfeld-Premberg, Abbess (1793–1801)
- Maria Helena von Freien-Seiboltsdorf, Abbess (1801–1803)

- Prince-Abbey of Obermünster (complete list) –

- Maria Josepha von Neuenstein-Hubacker, Abbess (1775–1803)

- Imperial County of Ortenburg (complete list) –

- Joseph Charles Leopold, Count (1787–1805)

- Pappenheim (complete list) –

- Charles Theodore Frederick Eugene Francis, Count (1792–1806)

- Prince-Bishopric of Passau (complete list) –

- Leopold Leonard, Prince-Bishop (1796–1803)

- Prince-Bishopric of Regensburg (complete list) –

- Joseph Konrad von Schroffenberg, Prince-bishop (1790–1803)

- Prince-Archbishopric of Salzburg (complete list) –

- Hieronymus von Colloredo, Prince-archbishop (1772–1803)

== Bohemian ==
- Kingdom of Bohemia (complete list) –

- Francis II, King (1792–1835)

== Franconian ==
- Prince-Bishopric of Bamberg (complete list) –

- Christoph Franz von Buseck, Prince-bishop (1795–1802)

- Prince-Bishopric of Eichstätt (complete list, de) –

- Joseph Graf von Stubenberg, Prince-bishop (1790–1802)

- Hohenlohe-Bartenstein (complete list) –

- Louis Aloysius, Prince (1799–1806)
- Karl August, Prince (1806)

- Hohenlohe-Ingelfingen (complete list) –

- Frederick Louis, Prince (1796–1806)
- August, Prince (1806)

- Hohenlohe-Jagstberg (complete list) –

- Karl Joseph, Prince (1798–1806)

- Hohenlohe-Kirchberg (complete list) –

- Christian Friedrich Karl zu Hohenlohe-Kirchberg, Prince (1767–1806)

- Hohenlohe-Langenburg (complete list) –

- Karl Ludwig, Prince (1789–1806)

- Hohenlohe-Oehringen –

- Ludwig Friedrich Karl (Hohenlohe-Neuenstein-Öhringen), Prince (1765–1805)

inherited by Frederick Louis of Hohenlohe-Ingelfingen

- Hohenlohe-Waldenburg-Schillingsfürst (complete list) –

- Charles Albert III, Prince (1796–1806)

- Schönborn-Heusenstamm (complete list) –

- Anselm Posthumous, Count (1726–1801)

- Schönborn-Wiesentheid (complete list) –

- Damian Hugo Erwin, Count (1772–1806)

- Prince-Bishopric of Würzburg (complete list) –

- Georg Karl Ignaz von Fechenbach zu Laudenbach, Prince-bishop (1795–1803)

== Electoral Rhenish ==
- Arenberg (complete list) –

- Louis Engelbert, Duke (1778–1803)
- Prosper Louis, Duke (1803–1810)

- Elector-Archbishopric of Cologne (complete list) –

- Maximilian Franz of Austria, Archbishop-elector (1784–1801)
- Anton Viktor of Austria, Archbishop-elector (1801–1803)

- Elector-Bishopric of Mainz (complete list) –

- Friedrich Karl Joseph von Erthal, Archbishop-elector (1774–1802)
- Karl Theodor Anton Maria von Dalberg, Archbishop-elector (1802–1803)

- Electoral Palatinate (complete list) –

- Maximilian I Joseph, Count Palatine of Zweibrücken (1795–1799), Elector of Palatinate and of Bavaria (1799–1803)

- Thurn und Taxis (complete list) –

- Karl Anselm, Prince (1773–1805)
- Karl Alexander, Prince (1805–1806)

- Elector-Bishopric of Trier (complete list) –

- Clemens Wenzel of Saxony, Archbishop-elector (1768–1801)

== Lower Rhenish–Westphalian ==
- Bentheim-Bentheim (complete list) –

- Frederick Charles, Count (1731–1803)
- Louis of Bentheim-Steinfurt, Count (1803–1806)

- Bentheim-Steinfurt (complete list) –

- Louis, Count (1780–1803)

- Bentheim-Tecklenburg-Rheda (complete list) –

- Moritz Kasimir II, Count (1768–1805)
- Emil Friedrich I, Count (1805–1808)

- Princely Abbey of Corvey (de:complete list) –

- Ferdinand von Lüninck, Prince-bishop (1794–1802)

- Essen Abbey (complete list) –

- Maria Kunigunde of Saxony, Princess-Abbess (1776–1802)

- Herford Abbey (complete list) –

- Frederica Charlotte, Abbess (1764–1802)

- Limburg-Styrum-Borkelö (complete list) –

- Otto Ernest Gelder, Count (1776–1806)

- Limburg-Styrum-Bronchhorst (complete list) –

- Frederick Theodore Ernest, Count (1766–1806)

- Limburg-Styrum-Styrum (complete list) –

- Ernst Maria von Limburg-Styrum, Countess (1794–1806)

- Principality of Lippe (complete list) –

- Leopold I, Count (1782–1789), Prince (1789–1802)
- Leopold II, Prince (1802–1851)

- Lippe-Biesterfeld (complete list) –

- Karl, Count (1781–1810)

- Prince-Bishopric of Münster (complete list) –

- Maximilian Franz, Prince-bishop (1784–1801)
- Anton Victor, Prince-bishop (1801–1802)

- Principality of Orange-Nassau –

- William V (1751–1806)
- William I (1806, 1813–1815)

- Principality of Nassau-Orange-Fulda –

- William I, Prince (1803–1806)

- Duchy of Oldenburg (complete list) –

- Wilhelm I, Duke (1785–1810), Grand Duke (1815–1823)

- Principality of Orange-Nassau (complete list) –

- William V, Prince (1751–1806)
- William VI, Prince (1806)

- Prince-Bishopric of Osnabrück (complete list) –

- Frederick of York and Albany, Prince-bishop (1764–1802)

- Prince-Bishopric of Paderborn (complete list) –

- Franz Egon von Fürstenberg, Prince-bishop (1789–1825)

- Wied-Neuwied (complete list) –

- Frederick Charles, Prince (1791–1802)
- John Augustus, Prince (1802–1806)

- Wied-Runkel (complete list) –

- Karl Ludwig Friedrich Alexander, Prince (1791–1806)

== Upper Rhenish ==
- Prince-Bishopric of Basel (complete list) –

- Franz Xaver von Neveu, Prince-bishop (1794–1803)

- Free City of Frankfurt (de:complete list) –

- Senior Mayors (de:complete list) –

- Anton Ulrich von Holzhausen, Senior Mayor (1800–1801)
- Adolph Carl von Humbracht, Senior Mayor (1801–1802)
- Johann Nicolaus Olenschlager von Olenstein, Senior Mayor (1802–1803)
- Johann Friedrich von Riese, Senior Mayor (1803–1804)
- Johann Nicolaus Olenschlager von Olenstein, Senior Mayor (1804–1805)
- Friedrich August von Wiesenhütten, Senior Mayor (1805–1806)
- Anton Ulrich Carl von Holzhausen, Senior Mayor (1806)

- Stadtschultheißens (de:complete list) –

- Johann Friedrich Maximilian von Stalburg, Stadtschultheißen (1788–1802)
- Wilhelm Carl Ludwig Moors, Stadtschultheißen (1788–1806)
- Friedrich Carl Schweitzer, Stadtschultheißen (1806)

- Princely Abbey of Fulda (complete list) –

- Adalbert von Harstall, Prince-bishop (1789–1802)

- Hesse-Darmstadt (complete list) –

- Louis X, Landgrave of Hesse-Darmstadt (1790–1806), Grand Duke of Hesse (1806–1830)

- Grand Duchy of Hesse and by Rhine (complete list) –

- Louis I, Landgrave of Hesse-Darmstadt (1790–1806), Grand Duke of Hesse (1806–1830)

- Hesse-Homburg (complete list) –

- Frederick V, Landgrave (1751–1820)

- Hesse-Kassel (complete list) –

- William XIII, Landgrave of Hesse-Kassel (1785–1803), Elector of Hesse (1803–1807, 1813–1821)

- Electorate of Hesse (complete list) –

- William I, Landgrave of Hesse-Kassel (1785–1803), Elector of Hesse (1803–1807, 1813–1821)

- Hesse-Philippsthal (complete list) –

- William, Landgrave (1770–1806)

- Hesse-Philippsthal-Barchfeld (complete list) –

- Adolph, Landgrave (1777–1803)
- Charles, Landgrave (1803–1854)

- Hesse-Rotenburg (complete list) –

- Charles Emmanuel, Landgrave (1778–1812)

- Isenburg-Birstein (complete list) –

- Wolfgang Ernest II, Prince (1754–1803)
- Charles of Isenburg, Prince of Isenburg (1803–1806)

- Isenburg-Büdingen (complete list) –

- Ernst Casimir II. von Isenburg und Büdingen, Count (1775–1801)
- Ernest Casimir, Count (1801–1840), Prince (1840–1848)

- Isenburg-Büdingen-Birstein (complete list) –

- Wolfgang Ernest II, Prince (1754–1803)
- Karl, Prince (1803–1820)

- Isenburg-Meerholz (complete list) –

- John Frederick William, Count (1774–1802)
- Charles Louis William, Count (1802–1806)

- Isenburg-Philippseich (complete list) –

- Henry Ferdinand, Count (1779–1806)

- Isenburg-Wächtersbach –

- Louis Maximilian I, Count (1798–1805)
- Louis Maximilian II, Count (1805–1806)

- Principality of Isenburg (complete list) –

- Charles of Isenburg, Prince of Isenburg (1803–1806)

- Leiningen-Dagsburg-Falkenburg –

- Maria Louise Albertine, Countess (1766–c.1803)

- Leiningen-Westerburg-Altleiningen (de:complete list) –

- Christian Karl, Count (1770–1806)

- Leiningen-Westerburg-Neuleiningen (de:complete list) –

- Ferdinand Karl III, Count (1798–1806)

- Principality of Leiningen (de:complete list) –

- Carl Friedrich Wilhelm, Count (1756–1779), Prince (1779–1807)

- Nassau-Usingen (complete list) –:*Charles William, Prince (1775–1803)

- Frederick Augustus, Prince of Nassau-Usingen (1803–1806), Duke of Nassau (1806–1816)

- Nassau-Weilburg (complete list) –

- Frederick William, Princely count (1788–1806), Prince (1806–1816)

- Salm-Horstmar (complete list) –

- Frederick Charles Augustus, Count (1803–1813)

- Salm-Kyrburg (complete list) –

- Frederick IV, Prince (1794–1813)

- Salm-Reifferscheid-Bedburg (complete list) –

- Francis William, Altgrave (1798–1804), Prince (1804–1806)

- Salm-Reifferscheid-Dyck (complete list) –

- Francis William, Count (1798–1804), Prince (1804–1806)

- Salm-Reifferscheid-Hainsbach (complete list) –

- Francis Wenceslaus, Altgrave (1769–1811)

- Salm-Reifferscheid-Krautheim (complete list) –

- Francis William, Altgrave (1798–1804), Prince (1804–1806)

- Salm-Reifferscheid-Raitz (complete list) –

- Charles Joseph, Altgrave (1769–1790), Prince (1790–1811)

- Salm-Salm (complete list) –

- Konstantin Alexander, Prince (1778–1813)

- Sayn-Wittgenstein-Berleburg (complete list) –

- Albrecht, Prince (1800–1806)

- Sayn-Wittgenstein-Hohenstein (complete list) –

- Friedrich II, Count (1796–1801), Prince (1801–1806)

- Prince-Bishopric of Sion (complete list) –

- Joseph Anton Blatter, Prince-Bishop (1790–1807)

- Solms-Braunfels (complete list) –

- Wilhelm Christian Karl, Prince (1783–1806)

- Prince-Bishopric of Strasbourg (complete list) –

- Louis René Édouard de Rohan-Guéméné, Prince-Bishop (1779–1801)
- Jean Pierre Saurine, Prince-Bishop (1802–1803)

- Prince-Bishopric of Speyer (complete list) –

- Philipp Franz Wilderich of Walderdorf, Prince-bishop (1801–1802)

- Principality of Waldeck and Pyrmont (complete list) –

- Friedrich Karl August, Prince (1763–1812)

- Prince-Bishopric of Worms (complete list) –

- Friedrich Karl Josef von Erthal, Prince-bishop (1774–1802)

== Lower Saxon ==
- Bremen-Verden (complete list) –

- George III, Duke (1760–1807, 1813–1820)

- Principality of Brunswick-Wolfenbüttel/ Principality of Wolfenbüttel (complete list) –

- Charles William Ferdinand, Prince (1780–1806)
- Frederick William, Prince of Brunswick-Wolfenbüttel (1806–1807), Duke of Brunswick (1813–1815)

conquered by the French Kingdom of Westphalia, 1807–1813; in 1814 reformed as the: Duchy of Brunswick

- Duchy of Brunswick (complete list) –

- Frederick William, Prince of Brunswick-Wolfenbüttel (1806–1807), Duke of Brunswick (1813–1815)

- Gandersheim Abbey (complete list) –

- Augusta Dorothea, Princess-Abbess (1778–1810)

- Electorate/ Kingdom of Hanover (complete list) –

- George III, Elector (1760–1806), King (1814–1820)

- Free City of Hamburg (complete list) –

- Franz Anton Wagener, Mayor (1790–1801)
- Peter Hinrich Widow, Mayor (1800–1802)
- Friedrich von Graffen, Mayor (1801–1810)
- Wilhelm Amsinck, Mayor (1802)
- Johann Arnold Heise, Mayor (1807)

- Prince-Bishopric of Hildesheim (complete list) –

- Franz Egon von Fürstenberg, Prince-bishop (1789–1803)

- Duchy of Holstein

- Dukes (complete list) –

- Christian VII, Duke of Holstein-Glückstadt (1766–1773), of Holstein (1773–1808)

- Statholders (complete list) –

- Charles of Hesse-Kassel, Statholder (1768–1836)

- Prince-bishopric of Lübeck (complete list) –

- Peter Frederick Louis, Prince-bishop (1785–1803)

- Free City of Lübeck (complete list) –

- Johann Philipp Plessing, Mayor (1804)
- Johann Caspar Lindenberg, Mayor (1805)
- Mattheus Rodde, Mayor (1806)
- Johann Matthaeus Tesdorpf, Mayor (1806)

- Duchy/ Grand Duchy of Mecklenburg-Schwerin (complete list) –

- Frederick Francis I, Duke (1785–1815), Grand Duke (1815–1837)

- Duchy/ Grand Duchy of Mecklenburg-Strelitz (complete list) –

- Charles II, Duke (1794–1815), Grand Duke (1815–1816)

- Duchy/ Grand Duchy of Oldenburg (complete list) –

- Wilhelm, Duke (1784/85–1810, 1813–1815), Grand Duke (1815–1823)

== Upper Saxon ==
- Electorate/ Kingdom of Saxony (complete list) –

- Frederick Augustus the Just, Elector (1763–1806), King (1806–1827)

- Electorate of Brandenburg, Kingdom of Prussia (complete list, complete list) –

- Frederick William III, Elector (1797–1806), King (1797–1840)

- Anhalt-Bernburg (complete list) –

- Alexius Frederick Christian, Prince (1796–1807), Duke (1807–1834)

- Anhalt-Bernburg-Schaumburg-Hoym (complete list) –

- Karl Louis, Prince (1772–1806)

- Anhalt-Dessau (complete list) –

- Leopold III, Prince (1751–1758), Duke (1758–1817), Regent of Anhalt-Köthen (1812–1817)

- Reuss-Ebersdorf (complete list) –

- Heinrich LI, Count (1779–1806), Prince (1806–1822)

- Anhalt-Köthen (complete list) –

- Augustus Christian Frederick, Prince (1789–1806), Duke (1806–1812)

- Reuss-Greiz (complete list) –

- Heinrich XIII, Prince (1800–1817)

- Reuss-Lobenstein (complete list) –

- Heinrich XXXV, Count (1782–1790), Prince (1790–1805)
- Heinrich LIV, Prince (1805–1824)

- Reuss-Schleiz (complete list) –

- Heinrich XLII, Count (1784–1806), Prince (1806–1818)

- Saxe-Coburg-Saalfeld (complete list) –

- Francis, Duke (1800–1806)

- Saxe-Gotha-Altenburg (complete list) –

- Ernest II, Duke (1772–1804)
- Augustus, Duke (1804–1822)

- Saxe-Altenburg, Saxe-Hildburghausen (complete list) –

- Frederick, Duke of Saxe-Hildburghausen (1780–1826), of Saxe-Altenburg (1826–1834)

- Saxe-Meiningen (complete list) –

- Georg I, Duke (1782–1803)
- Louise Eleonore of Hohenlohe-Langenburg, Regent (1803–1821)

- Saxe-Weimar-Eisenach (complete list) –

- Karl August, Duke (1758–1815), Grand Duke (1815–1828)

- Schwarzburg-Rudolstadt (complete list) –

- Louis Frederick II, Prince (1793–1807)

- Schwarzburg-Sondershausen (complete list) –

- Günther Friedrich Carl I, Prince (1794–1835)

- Stolberg-Rossla (de:complete list) –

- Heinrich Friedrich Christian zu Stolberg-Roßla, Count (1768–1806)

- Stolberg-Stolberg (de:complete list) –

- Karl Ludwig zu Stolberg-Stolberg, Count (1765–1806)

- Stolberg-Wernigerode (complete list) –

- Christian Frederick, Count (1778–1807)

== Swabian ==
- Prince-Bishopric of Augsburg (complete list) –

- Clemens Wenceslaus of Saxony, Prince-bishop (1768–1803)

- Margraviate/ Electorate/ Grand Duchy of Baden (complete list, complete list) –

- Charles Frederick, Margrave of Baden-Durlach (1746–1771), of Baden (1771–1803), Elector (1803–1806), Grand Duke (1806–1811)

- Breisgau () –
- Prince-Bishopric of Constance (complete list) –

- Karl Theodor von Dahlberg, Prince-bishop (1799–1803)

- Prince-Provostry of Ellwangen (complete list) –

- Clemens Wenceslaus, Prince-provost (1787–1803)

- Gutenzell Abbey (de:complete list) –

- Maria Justina von Erolzheim, Princess-abbess (1776–1803)

- Hohenzollern-Hechingen (complete list) –

- Hermann, Prince (1798–1810)

- Hohenzollern-Sigmaringen (complete list) –

- Anton Aloys, Prince (1785–1831)

- Princely Abbey of Kempten (complete list) –

- de:Castolus Reichlin von Meldegg, Prince-abbot (1793–1803)

- Königsegg-Aulendorf (complete list) –

- Ernest, Count (1786–1803)
- Francis, Count (1803–1806)

- Königsegg-Rothenfels (complete list) –

- Francis Fidelis Anthony, Count (1771–1804)

- Oettingen-Wallerstein (complete list) –

- Kraft Ernst, Count (1766–1774), Prince (1774–1802)
- Ludwig Kraft, Prince (1802–1806)

- Stadion-Thannhausen (complete list) –

- John George Joseph Nepomuk, Count (1785–1806)

- Stadion-Warthausen (complete list) –

- Johann Philipp, Count (1787–1806)

- Duchy/ Electorate/ *Kingdom of Württemberg (complete list) –

- Frederick I, Duke (1797–1803), Elector (1803–1805), King (1805–1816)

== Bibliography ==
- Phillips, Walter Alison; Atkinson, Charles Francis (1911). "Hohenlohe" . In Chisholm, Hugh (ed.). Encyclopædia Britannica. Vol. 13 (11th ed.). Cambridge University Press. pp. 572–575.
