= Alberweiler Castle =

- Germany
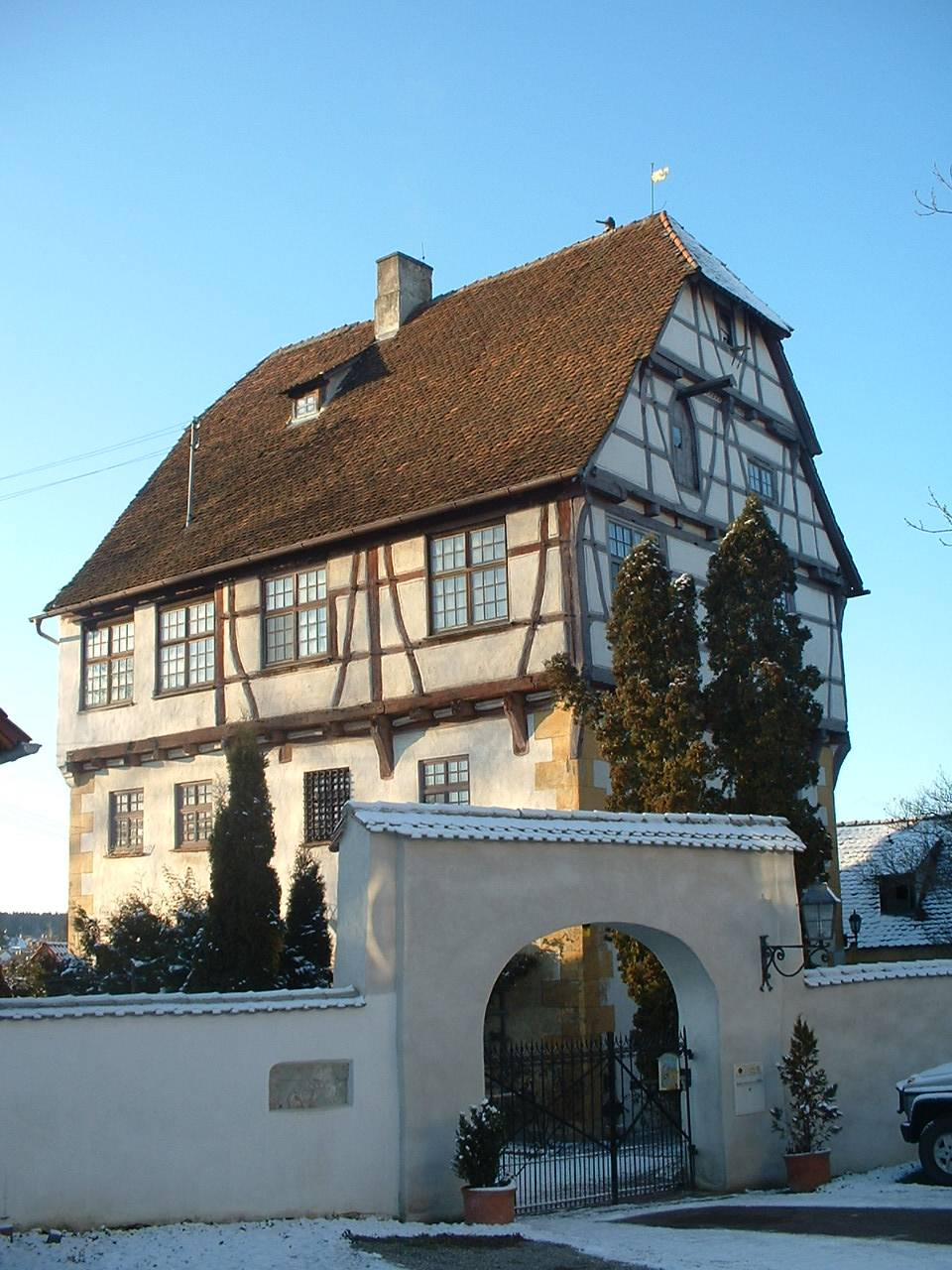

Site information
- Type: Castle

Location
- Coordinates: 48°9′29.88″N 9°45′57.66″E

Alberweiler Castle is a small castle-like structure in the village of Alberweiler, now part of the municipality of Schemmerhofen in the state of Baden-Württemberg, Germany. It is situated on a hillside in the centre of the village. The ground and the first floor of the castle are made of stone whereas the upper storeys consist of three projecting half-timbered floors.

== History ==
A castle is first mentioned in sources dating from the 11th century. It was occupied by knights in the service of the Counts of Berg-Wartstein. This early structure was destroyed in 1487 but soon after, towards the end of the 15th century, a new castle was erected at the behest of Bartholome of Warthausen. Some remains of the circular rampart are still visible. Following the extinction of the house of Warthausen zu Alberweiler in 1585, the castle was enfeoffed to the Counts of Stadion by Emperor Rudolf II. The castle was renovated in early-Baroque style in the 17th century. The gate was also constructed during these restoration works. At around 1700, the castle functioned as residence for the local reeve, the Counts of Stadion residing at Warthausen Castle, and subsequently went into private ownership during the course of the 18th century. In 1826, the Counts of Stadion sold all rights to the village and the castle to the Kingdom of Württemberg. Following alterations in 1880, the structure slowly began to fall into disrepair. The castle was extensively restored in the late 20th century and is privately owned today.

== See also ==
- List of castles in Baden-Württemberg
