= Schemmerhofen =

- Municipality
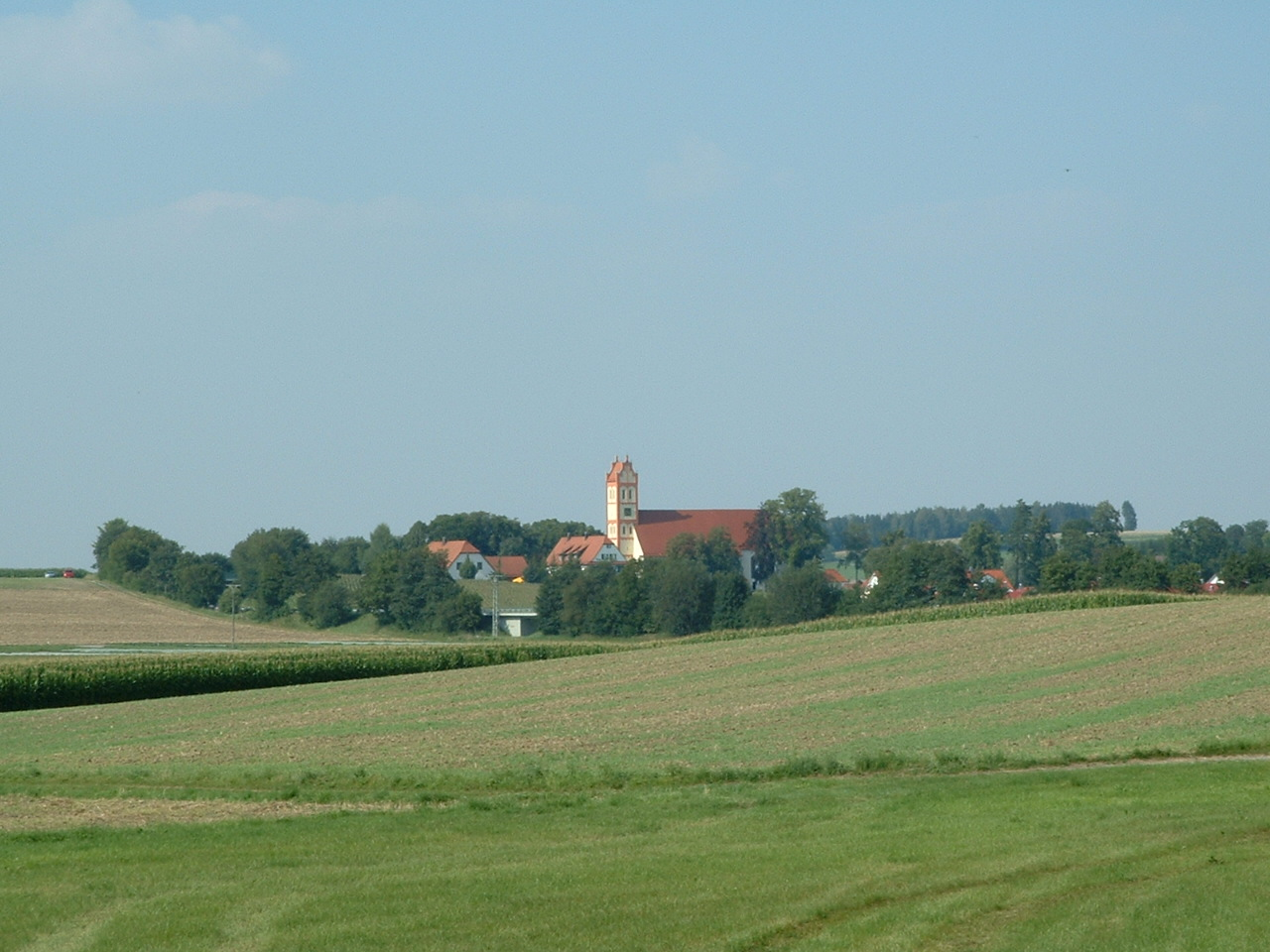

- Coat of arms

- Location of Schemmerhofen within Biberach district
- Interactive map of Schemmerhofen
- Location within Germany Location within Baden-Württemberg
- Coordinates: 48°10′N 9°47′E
- Country: Germany
- State: Baden-Württemberg
- Admin. region: Tübingen
- District: Biberach

Government
  - Mayor (2022–30): Klaus Wilhelm Tappeser

Area
  - Total: 50.21 km^{2} (19.39 sq mi)
- Elevation: 520 m (1,710 ft)

Population (2025-12-31)
  - Total: 8,868
  - Density: 176.6/km^{2} (457.4/sq mi)
- Time zone: UTC+01:00 (CET)
  - Summer (DST): UTC+02:00 (CEST)
- Postal codes: 88433
- Dialling codes: 07356
- Vehicle registration: BC
- Website: schemmerhofen.de

Schemmerhofen (German pronunciation: [ˈʃɛmɐhoːfn̩]) is a municipality ("Gemeinde") in the district ("Landkreis") of Biberach in Baden-Württemberg, Germany. Schemmerhofen is located in the Upper Swabia region ("Oberschwaben" or "Schwäbisches Oberland") of Baden-Württemberg.

== Geography ==
The municipality of Schemmerhofen is located 9 km (5.6 mi) north of the district town ("Kreisstadt") Biberach an der Riß. The municipality includes, in addition to the village of Schemmerhofen, the formerly autonomous villages of Schemmerberg, Ingerkingen, Altheim, Aßmannshardt and Alberweiler. The settlements ("Wohnplätze") Bachhof, Britschweiler, Brühlhof, Eichelsteig, Grafenwald, Mittenweiler, Öschhof and Ziegelei likewise fall under the municipality's jurisdiction.

The river Mühlbach flows through Aßmannshardt, Alberweiler and Schemmerhofen before emptying into the river Riß. The Riß in turn travels north through Schemmerberg before flowing into the Danube.

The municipality has a total population of 8,082.

== History ==
=== Schemmerhofen ===
It is impossible today to determine whether the term Scammara in a document in the year 851 referred to the village of Langenschemmern or Schemmerberg. Later references to ad Scammares in 1095, Schamern in 1127, Scammun in 1242 and Krutschemmern in 1319, indicate that no distinction was made during this period between the two towns. Only in 1361 is Landenschammar referenced for the first time.

From the end of the 14th century, a distinction was made between Oberschemmern and Unterschemmern (Upper and Lower Schemmern), even though the shortened name Schemmern, as well as the name used today, was also mentioned during this period. Schemmern is related to the word Schiene and refers to the reedbeds in the Riß River valley.

Originally, the hamlets of Aufhofen and Langenschemmern formed a single political entity. However, after the annexation by the newly formed Kingdom of Württemberg in 1806, the inhabitants of Aufhofen chose to secede from Langenschemmern. Since the properties of the inhabitants were spread over the territories of both villages, the separation was not completed until 1843.

As part of the territorial reform ("Gebietsreform") in Baden-Württemberg, Langenschemmern and Aufhofen reunited on 1 August 1972 to become the community of Schemmerhofen.

Schemmerhofen currently has a population of 2928.

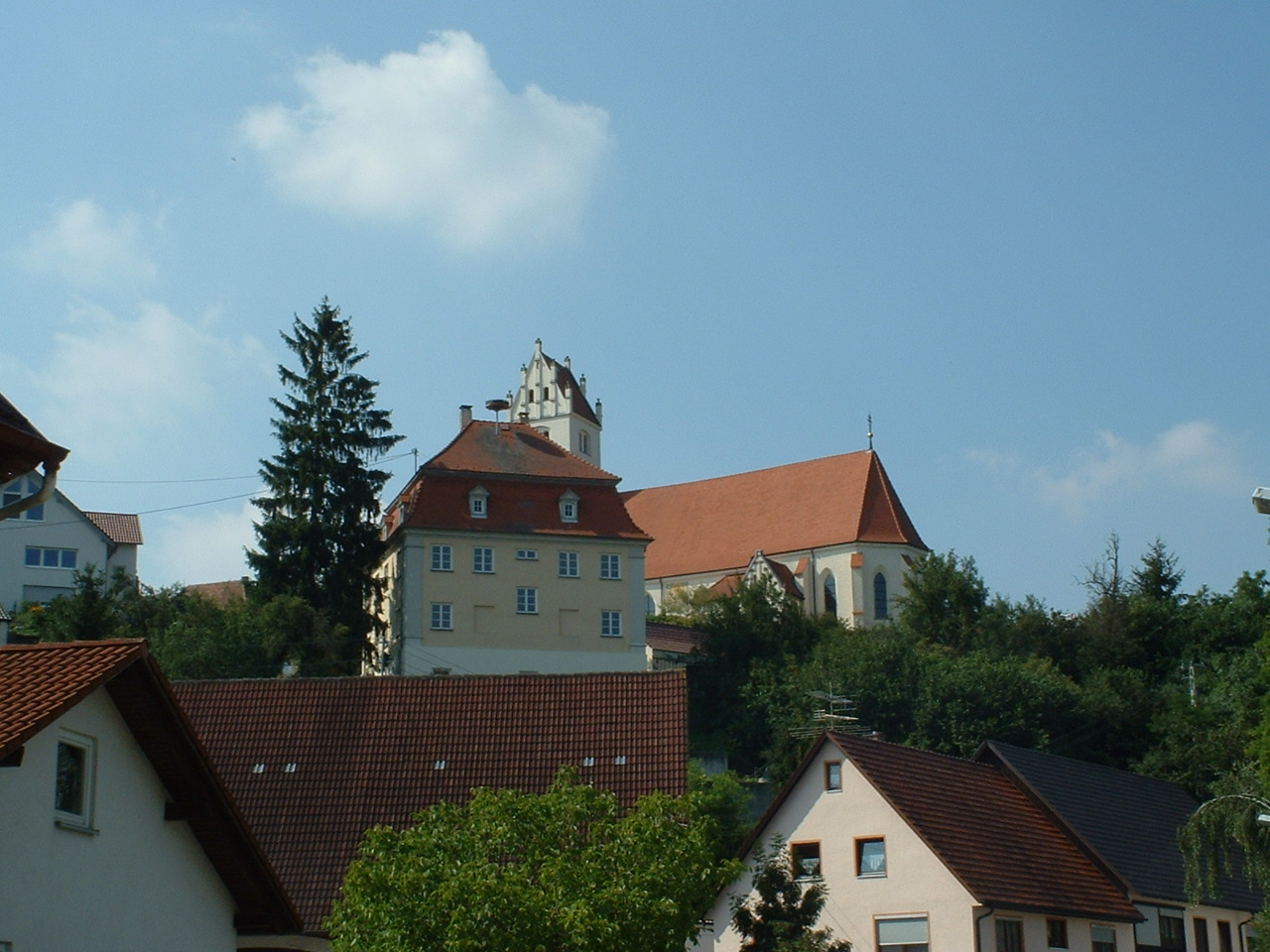
Schemmerberg

=== Schemmerberg ===
Schemmerberg has a population of 1220.

First mentioned in 1267 as Schamerberg, Schemmerberg has had its own parish church, dedicated to Saint Martin, since 1275. The origin of this church dates back to the earlier period of Christianization of Upper Swabia in the Early Middle Ages.

Originally belonging to the Herren of Schaemmern, Schemmerberg was divided in the late Middle Ages: one part belonging to the Counts of Wartstein and the other to the Herren of Sulmetingen. Both of these dominions held their land rights in Schemmerberg as vassals of the Austrian House of Habsburg.

The Counts of Wartstein sold their rights incrementally to the Imperial Abbey Salem during the 13th and 14th century. When Jakob and Sebastian von Sulmetingen also sold their possessions in Schemmerberg to the Imperial Abbey Salem in 1496, the entire village was owned by this abbey. As part of the Salem Abbey, Schemmerberg fell under the jurisdiction of the bailiffs of Upper Swabia, who resided in Altdorf. Due to the distance to Altdorf, King Maximilian I granted the Salem Abbey the right to establish a legal court in Schemmerberg in 1497.

During the German Peasants' War, the Baltringer Haufen looted and destroyed the Schemmerberg Castle on 26 March 1525, after the resident monks had fled to Biberach an der Riss. The castle was rebuilt in 1532 and eventually demolished in 1837.

In 1742, the Salem Abbey received the privilege to inflict high justice ("Blutgerichtsbarkeit" or "Blutgericht").

Following the Reichsdeputationshauptschluss, (the mediatisation and secularisation of numerous secular and ecclesiastical principalities within the former Holy Roman Empire) Schemmerberg became subject to the princely house of Thurn und Taxis. In 1806, Schemmerberg was annexed by the newly formed Kingdom of Württemberg.

On January 1, 1974, Schemmerberg was incorporated into the municipality of Schemmerhofen.

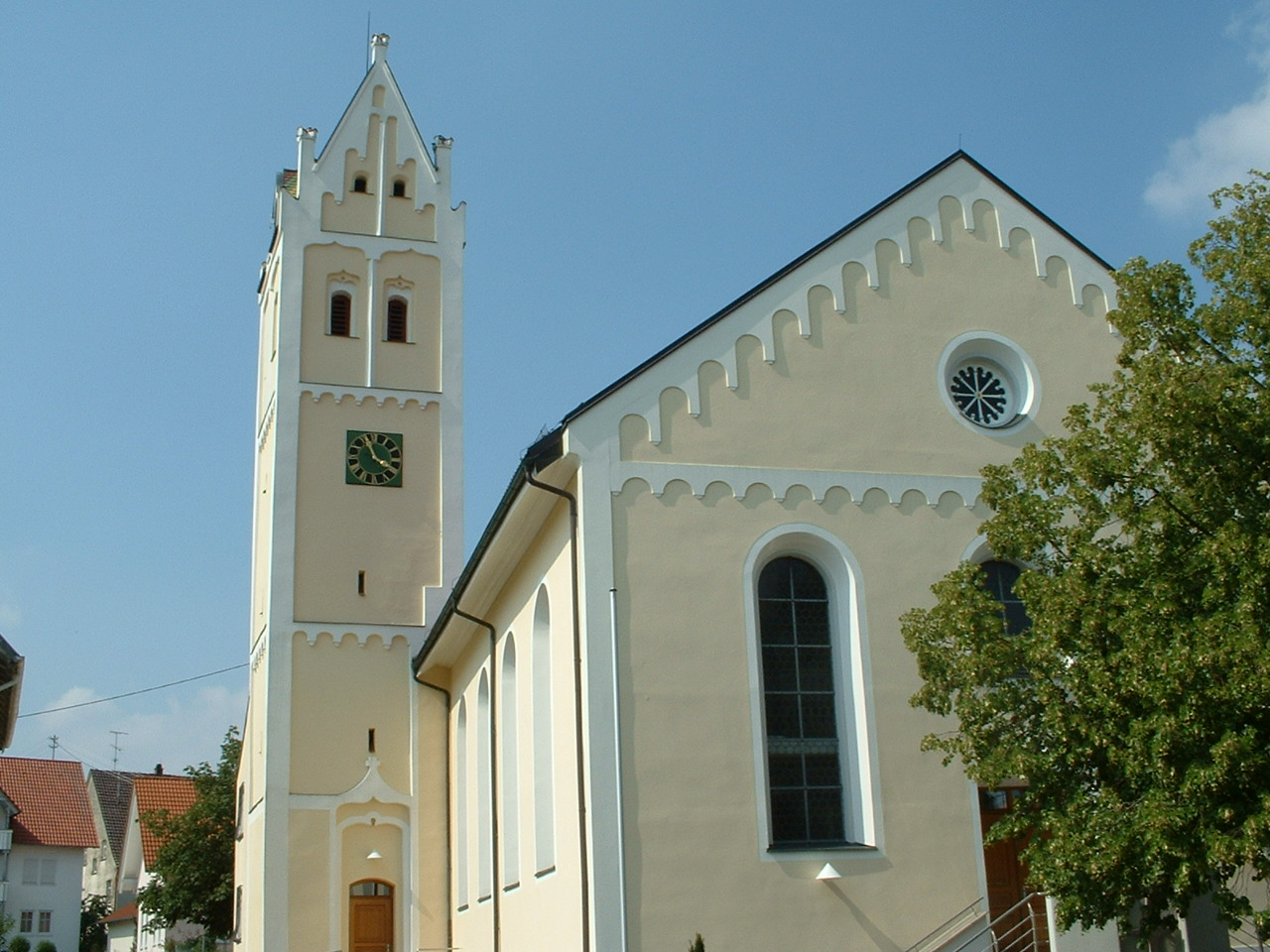
Ingerkingen, parish church St Ulrich

=== Ingerkingen ===
Ingerkingen has a population of 1194.

Ingerkingen is a village situated along the road connecting the former Free Imperial Cities Biberach and Ehingen. This road was of Roman origin.

The existence of a local aristocratic dynasty was first documented when, in 1246, Friedrich von Magenbuch transferred ownership of a demesne to the Imperial Abbey of Salem. In the course of this transaction, the brothers Konrad and Hermann von Ingerichingen renounced their rights to the demesne. Furthermore, several members of the local aristocracy appeared as witnesses in documents: in 1263 and 1286 a certain Konrad von Ingerichingen and in 1298 a certain Dietherus von Ingiringen. In 1314 Reinhard von Ingerichingen donated farms in the hamlet of Edenbachen to the Imperial Ochsenhausen Abbey.

Although Ingerkingen was under the jurisdiction of the Austrian house of Habsburg, the Imperial Knight of Stadion were enfeoffed with this right. When a royal decree on 10 December 1494 extended this jurisdiction to all inhabitants of Ingerkingen, a long-lasting conflict with the monastery of Buchau and the Imperial City of Biberach ensued, both of which feared this would infringe the rights they held in Ingerkingen. This was only resolved when Hans-Walter von Stadion sold the rights of low and high justice together with six farms of varying size to Biberach on 5 April 1526. The Imperial City of Biberach was to be the owner of Ingerkingen until 1801, when, as a result of the Treaty of Lunéville, the village fell to the Margrave of Baden, Charles Frederick, only to be annexed by the newly formed Kingdom of Württemberg in 1806.

On 1 January 1975, Ingerkingen was incorporated into the municipality of Schemmerhofen.

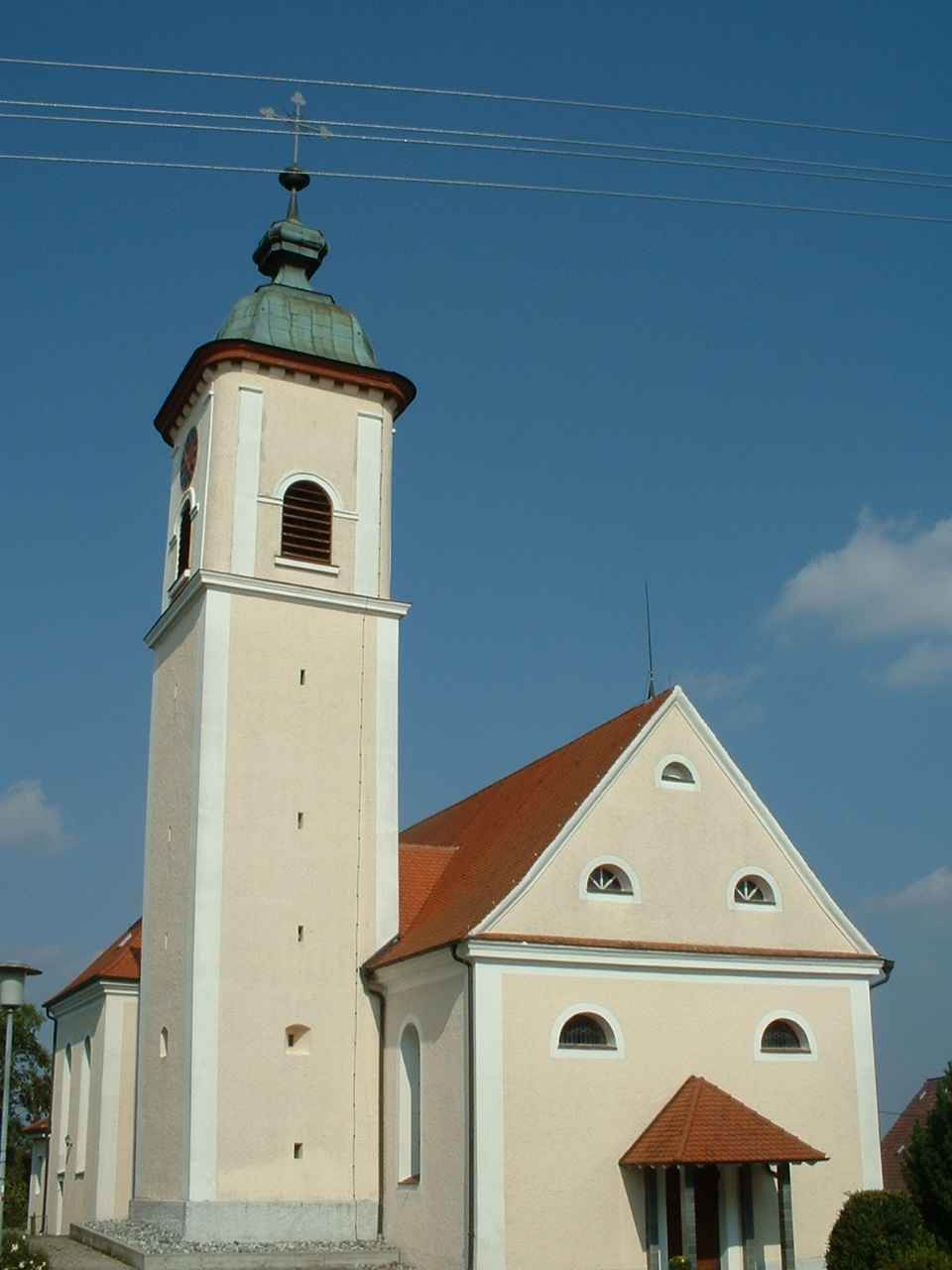
Altheim, parish church St Nicolas

=== Altheim ===
Altheim has a population of 686.

First mentioned in 851, Altheim is believed to be a Frankish foundation.

After having belonged to the territory of the Imperial Knight of Warthausen and their successors, the Counts of Wartenstein during the 13th and 14th centuries, the ownership of the village became divided between several entities. In 1304, parts of the village came into the ownership of the Imperial Abbey of Salem. The rest of the village belonged to the dynasty of the Imperial Knight of Stadion. This part was transferred into the possession of the Imperial Knight of Schienen zu Gammerschwang in 1505, who in turn transferred it to the Imperial Knight of Stauffenberg in 1591. On 12 November 1621, Hans Christoph Schenk von Stauffenberg sold half the village to the Imperial Abbey of Salem.

The development of the village was heavily influenced by these incessant partitions of rulership. In 1699, Altheim counted 12 houses belonging to the Imperial Abbey of Salem, 33 houses to the Imperial Knight of Stauffenberg and 2 houses to the monastery of Buchau.

Together with Schemmerberg, Altheim first fell to the princely house of Thurn and Taxis, following the Reichsdeputationshauptschluss, only to be annexed by the newly formed Kingdom Württemberg in 1806.

On 1 January 1975, Altheim was incorporated into the municipality of Schemmerhofen.

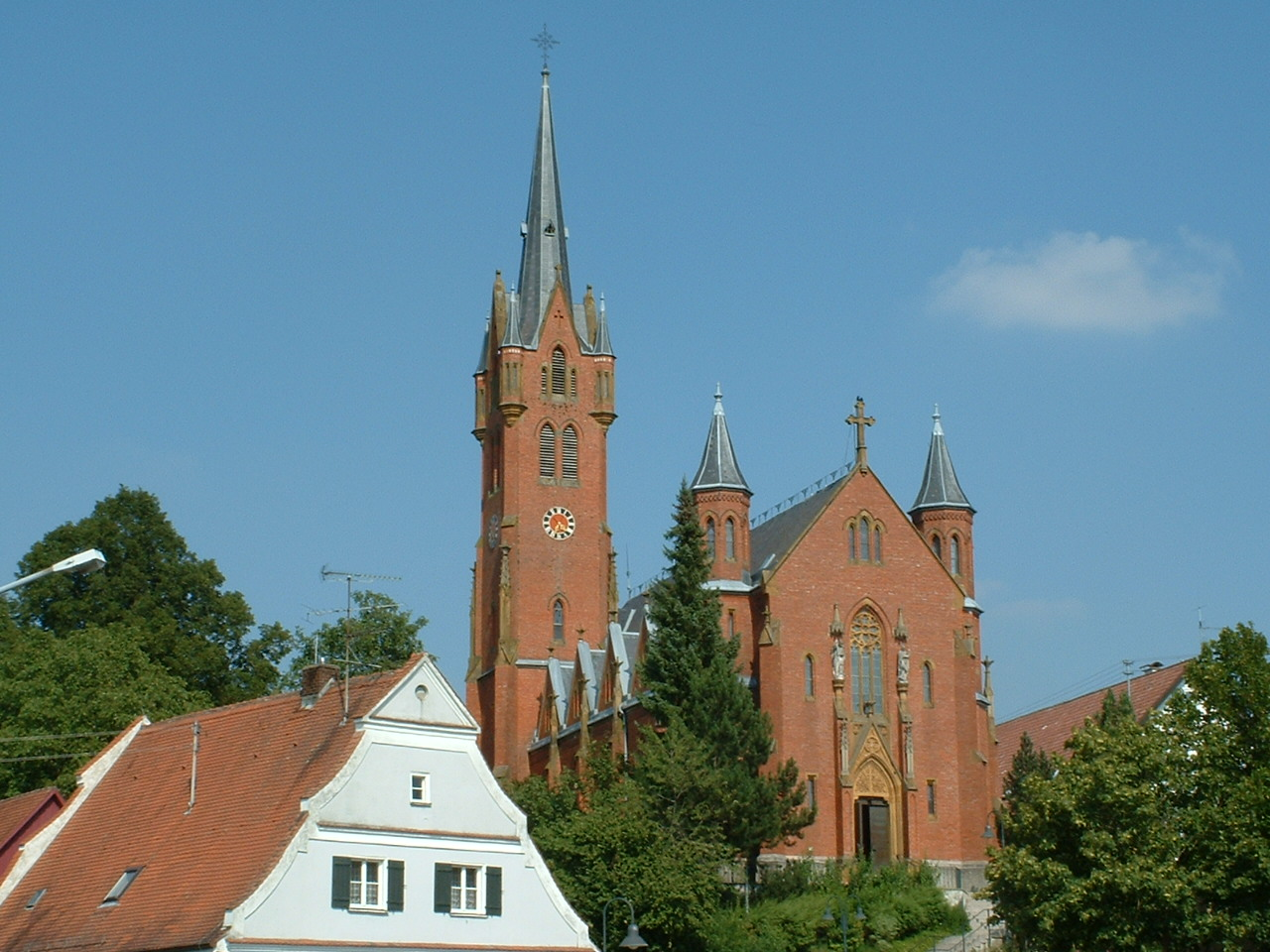
Aßmannshardt, parish church St Michael

=== Aßmannshardt ===
Aßmannshardt has a population of around 920.

Aßmannshardt was first mentioned as Aßmundeshart around 1180 in the Codex Hirsaugiensis, a book which systematically recorded all donations to Hirsau Abbey. Evidence of earlier settlement has been discovered in several tumuli which were dated to the Hallstadt culture. The name of the village contains the elements of a personal name Asmunt and the word hart which means forest or meadow.

toponymic evidence, such as Leithauser Wiesen, Lindacher-Weg-Ösch and Aufhofer Weiher, suggests that there were more settlements on the territory that now constitutes the village of Aßmannshardt. Another name of a village now lost is mentioned when during the late Middle Ages a conflict arose between the parish Aßmannshardt and Attenweiler regarding the rights held in Husshoven.

A local aristocratic dynasty was first recorded at the end of the 13th century when, in 1288, Konrad Schenk von Asmushard donated a meadow in Altheim. After 1300, the village was held by Seneschal Walter von Warthausen as a fief from Count Walter von Landau. Together with Warthausen, the village was sold to the house of Habsburg in 1331. It remained under the ultimate sovereignty of the house of Habsburg until 1806, being part of the barony of Warthausen. Warthausen, having been mortgaged several times, finally came into the possession of the Imperial City of Biberach in 1446 only to be released from Biberach's rule after the Protestant Reformation was introduced there. In 1529, Martin Schad of Mittelbiberach acquired the rights to Warthasuen and the village of Aßmannshardt. His family owned the village until they died out in the agnatic line in 1696, after which the Counts of Stadion were enfeoffed with Warthausen and thereby also Aßmannshardt.

During the Thirty Years War (1618–1648), Aßmannshardt was devastated. Most of the inhabitants died of war, plague and starvation. The village itself was burnt down. In order to repopulate the village, settlers from the Alps were introduced, mostly from Montafon and Vorarlberg. In 1662, there was not a single inhabitant who had either been born or brought up in the village.

The barony, which officially had been part of the Kingdom of Württemberg since 1806, was sold to the state on 16 January 1826 by Johann Philipp Eduard von Stadion, thereby relinquishing all seigneurial rights.

On 1 January 1975, Aßmannshardt was incorporated into the municipality of Schemmerhofen.

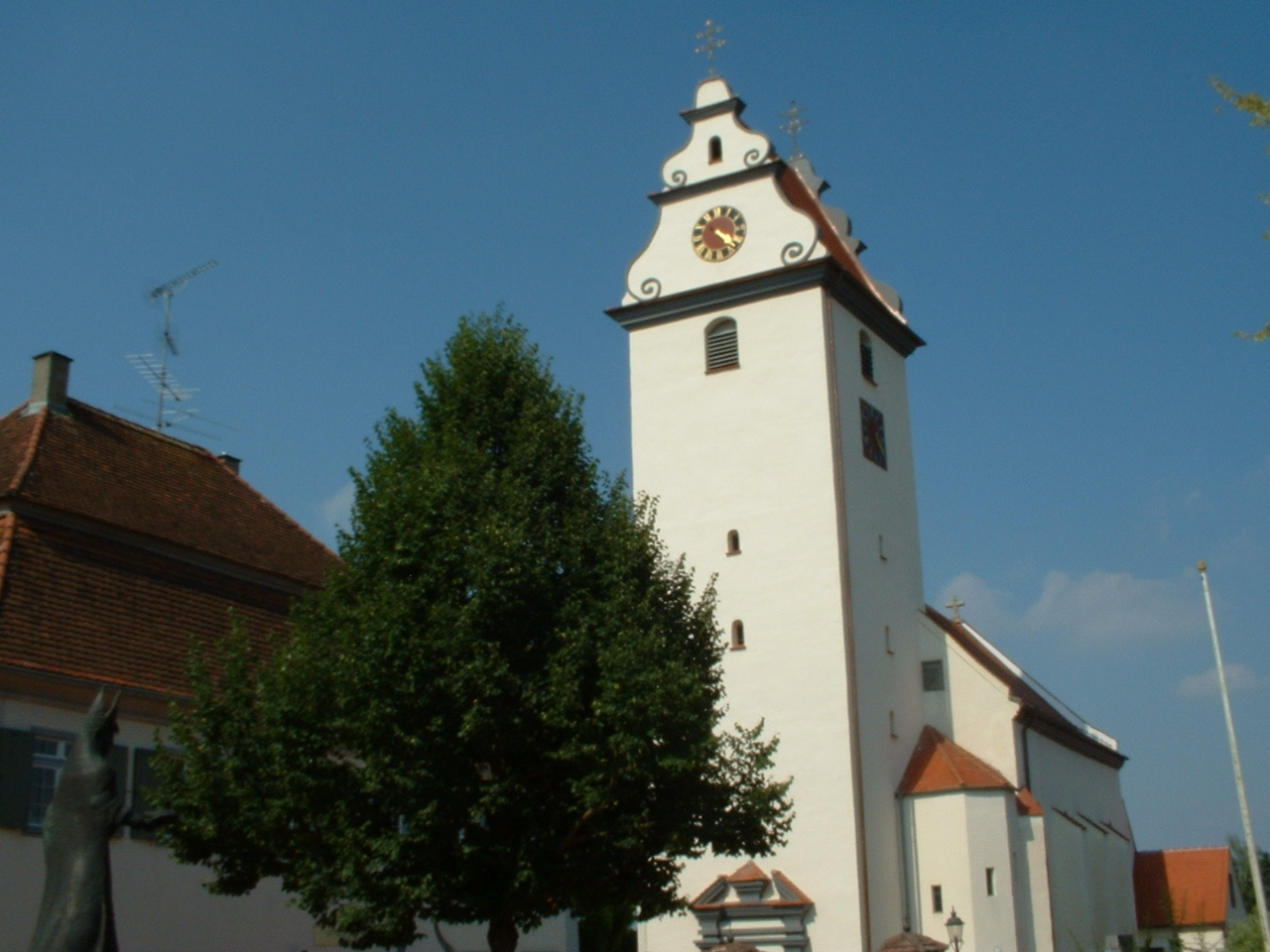
Alberweiler, parish church St Ulrich

=== Alberweiler ===
Alberweiler has a population of 753.

There is evidence to suggest that the village was founded in the 8th or 9th century. In the 11th century, Alberweiler consisted of seven fishermen's huts, a chapel and the local castle (Alberweiler Castle). In 1092 a parish church was mentioned.

Alberweiler was subject to the Counts of Warthausen, a collateral line of which had its residence there, until 1585, when it came into the possession of the Counts of Stadion.

The hamlet of Grafenwald belonged to Alberweiler. Originally owned by the Counts of Berg, the forest was cleared in 1581 and, following further clearing in 1683, was farmed by four tenants.

On 1 January 1975, Alberweiler was incorporated into the municipality of Schemmerhofen.

Historical Coat of Arms

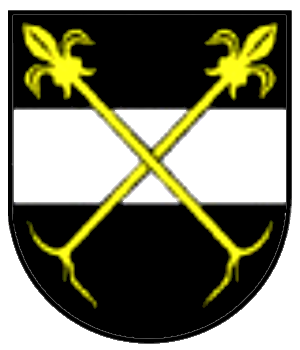
Alberweiler

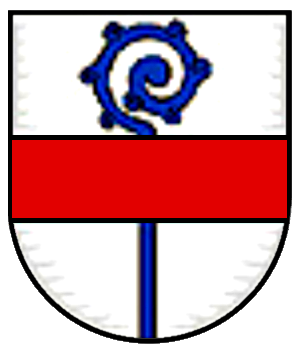
Altheim

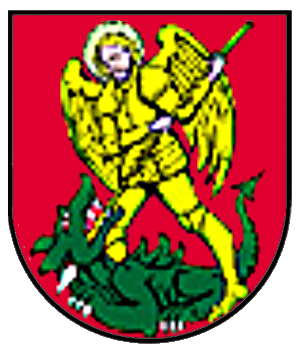
Aufhofen

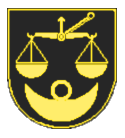
Aßmannshardt

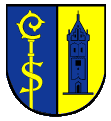
Ingerkingen

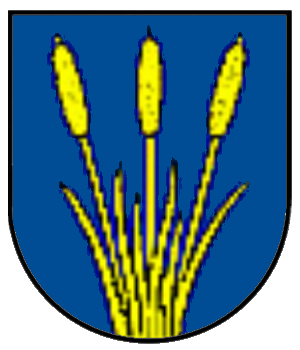
Langenschemmern

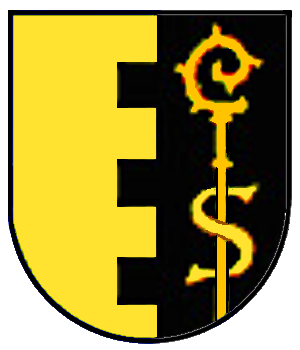
Schemmerberg

== Government and politics ==
=== Municipal council ===
The municipal council consists of 19 members, each representing the whole municipality. Each council member is elected for a five-year term. The council is chaired by the mayor.

Name	Representing
Hermann Ackermann	Alberweiler
Anton Bogenrieder	Altheim
Anton Hagel	Altheim
Florian Braun	Aßmannshardt
Frank Sauter	Aßmannshardt
Paul Haid	Ingerkingen
Jürgen Steinle	Ingerkingen
Jürgen Weber	Ingerkingen
Christian Engstler	Schemmerberg
Josef Hinsinger	Schemmerberg
Reiner Lebherz	Schemmerberg
Brigitte Bertsch	Schemmerhofen
Josef Bosshart	Schemmerhofen
Reinhold Brehm	Schemmerhofen
Christoph Glaser	Schemmerhofen
Christine Keller	Schemmerhofen
Jörg Rapp	Schemmerhofen
Josef Rapp	Schemmerhofen

=== International links ===
- Alberschwende, Austria
- Groslay, France
- Nofels, Austria

== Economy, industry and infrastructure ==
=== Industry ===
Schemmerhofen is a predominantly agricultural municipality. There is no large scale industry.

=== Traffic ===
Schemmerhofen is situated on the Bundesstraße 465 as well as on the Ulm-Friedrichshafen rail line. The closest passenger rail station is in Schemmerberg. The Langenschemmern station is only used by freight trains to transport sand and gravel.

=== Leisure ===
- Lake near Alberweiler

== Attractions ==
- Alberweiler Castle (Schlössle_Alberweiler)
- Alberweiler parish church Saint Ulrich
- Altheim parish church Saint Nikolaus
- Aßmannshardt parish church Saint Michael
- Aufhofen pilgrimage church, called Käppele (little chapel), in Schemmerhofen
- Ingerkingen parish church Saint Ulrich
- Langenschemmern parish church Saint Maurice, containing 14th century murals, in Schemmerhofen
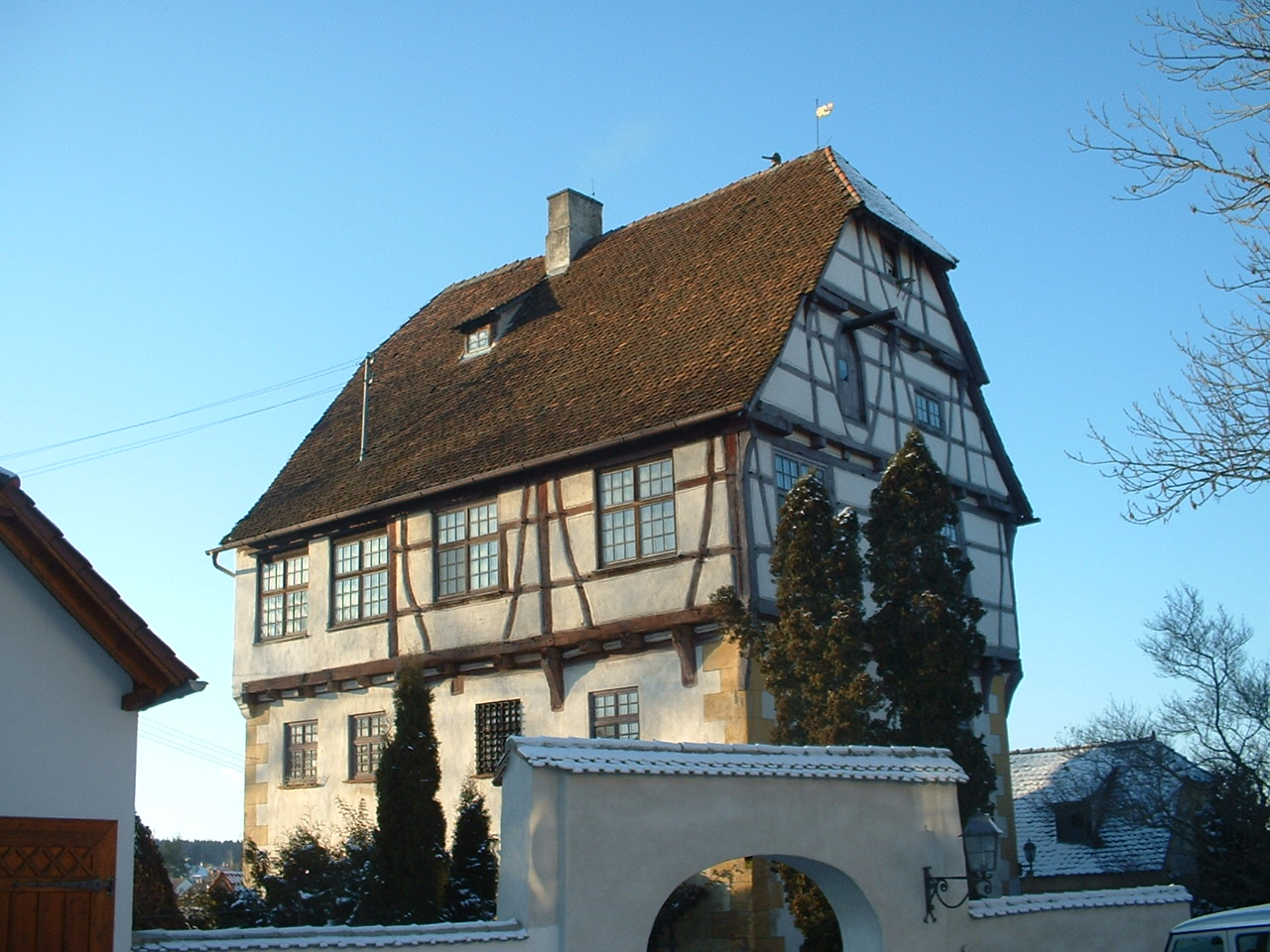
Alberweiler Castle

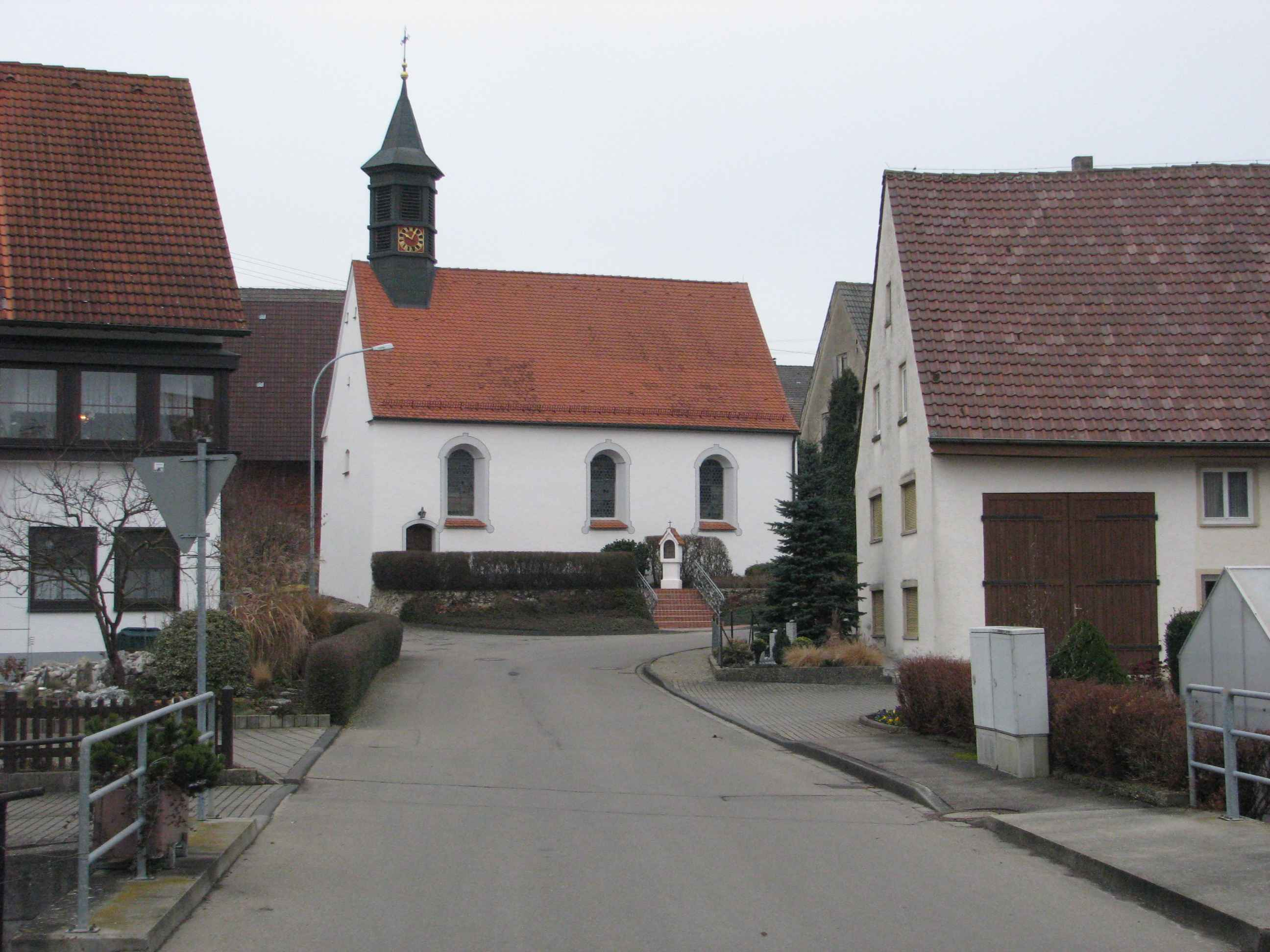
Langenschemmern, Pfarrkirche St. Maurice

== Notable people from Schemmerhofen ==
- Joseph Cades (1855–1943), church architect, was born in Altheim
- Karl Weller (1866–1943), historian, was born in Langenschemmern
- Anselm (Josef) Romer (1885–1951), Benedictine missionary, was born in Ingerkingen
- Prelate Franz Glaser (born 1938), canon in the Diocese of Rottenburg-Stuttgart, was born in Schemmerhofen
- Hansbert Bertsch (born 1941), headmaster at the Königin-Charlotte-Gymnasium Stuttgart (1984–2004), translator and linguist (Romance languages, Greek, Latin, Japanese)

== See also ==
- Upper Swabia
- Landkreis Biberach

== Sources ==
- Krezdorn, Siegfried & Schahl, Adolf, Schemmerhofen: Alberweiler, Altheim, Aßmannshardt, Aufhofen, Ingerkingen, Langenschemmern, Schemmerberg, Sigmaringen, 1980
- Steim, Karl Werner, 750 Jahre Alberweiler, Schemmerhofen, 2000
- Weiler, Fritz, 900 Jahre Aßmannshardt, 700 Jahre Pfarrei Sankt Michael. Rückblick und Gegenwartsaufnahme, Biberach an der Riss, 1980
