= Rhede (disambiguation) =

Rhede ia a municipality in the district of Borken in the state of North Rhine-Westphalia, Germany.

Rhede may also refer to:

- Rhede, Lower Saxony, a municipality in the Emsland district, Lower Saxony, Germany
- Bernhard Wilhelm von Rhede, Prince-Prior of the Principality of Heitersheim 1703–1721
- VfL Rhede, a German football team in the Oberliga Niederrhein, based in Rhede, North Rhine-Westphalia
