= Agenor Gołuchowski =

Agenor Gołuchowski is the name of:

- Agenor Romuald Gołuchowski (1812–1875), Polish-Austrian politician
- Agenor Maria Gołuchowski (1849–1921), Polish-Austrian politician and diplomat, son of Agenor Romuald
