= Franz Stadion, Count von Warthausen =

Franz Stadion, Graf von Warthausen
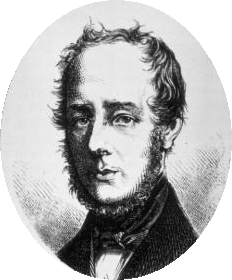

Interior Minister of the Austrian Empire
- In office 21 November 1848 – 28 July 1849
- Monarchs: Ferdinand I (1848); Francis Joseph I (1848–1849)
- Prime Minister: Prince Felix of Schwarzenberg
- Preceded by: Baron Anton von Doblhoff-Dier
- Succeeded by: Baron Alexander von Bach

Personal details
- Born: 27 July 1806 Vienna, Austrian Empire
- Died: 8 June 1853 (aged 46)

Franz Stadion, Graf von Warthausen (27 July 1806 – 8 June 1853), was an Austrian nobleman and a statesman, who served the Austrian Empire during the 1840s.

== Early life ==
Franz was born in Vienna, into the Stadion-Warthausen line of the House of Stadion, as a son of the Austrian diplomat Count Johann Philipp von Stadion-Warthausen and his wife and cousin, Countess Maria Anna von Stadion-Thannhausen (1777–1841).

== Biography ==
From 1841 he was Governor of the Austrian Littoral (with its capital at Trieste), from 1847 to 1848 Governor of Galicia (where he freed the peasants from labor duties), and from 1848 to 1849 he was Interior Minister and Minister of Education. He advocated constitutional government, decreed the Imposed March Constitution in March 1849 which was never enacted, and in 1849 promulgated the Gemeinde (municipality) legislation that granted governmental autonomy to all municipalities in the Austrian empire. Lewis Namier, in 1848: The Revolution of the Intellectuals (p. 18), calls him "one of the most enlightened and efficient Austrian administrators."

== Bibliography ==
- R. Hirsch, Franz Graf Stadion (Vienna, 1861).
- Rudolph Mattausch, "Franz Graf Stadion (1806–1853)" in Neue österreichische Biographie ab 1815: Grosse Österreicher, vol. XIV (Zurich-Leipzig-Vienna, 1960), pp. 62–73.

| Preceded by Baron Anton von Doblhoff-Dier | Interior Minister of the Austrian Empire; 1848–1849 | Succeeded by Baron Alexander von Bach |
| Preceded by Franz von Hochfelden (acting) | Governor of the Kingdom of Galicia and Lodomeria; 1847–1848 | Succeeded by Wilhelm von Hammerstein |
| Preceded by | Governor of the Austrian Littoral; 1841–1847 | Succeeded by |
