= Ignaz Balthasar Rinck von Baldenstein =

German nobility (1721–1807)

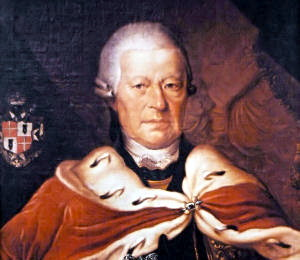
Ignaz Balthasar Rinck von Baldenstein

Ignaz Balthasar Willibald Rinck von Baldenstein (1721–1807), in French Ignace Balthasar Willibald Rinck de Baldenstein, was the last Grand Prior of the Maltese Grand Priory of Germany and the last prince of the Principality of Heitersheim.

== Biography ==
Von Baldenstein was born 4 August 1721 in Delémont, Switzerland to Josef Wilhelm Rinck von Baldenstein. In 1734 he became page to Grandmaster Manuel Pinto da Fonseca of the Order of Malta. On 30 May 1753 he was appointed Commander of Johanniter Coming Leuggern. On 10 December 1796 he was elected Grand Prior of the Maltese Grand Priory of Germany which made him an Imperial Prince of the Holy Roman Empire. He died on 30 June 1807 in Heitersheim.
