= Baron Alexander von Bach =

Austrian politician

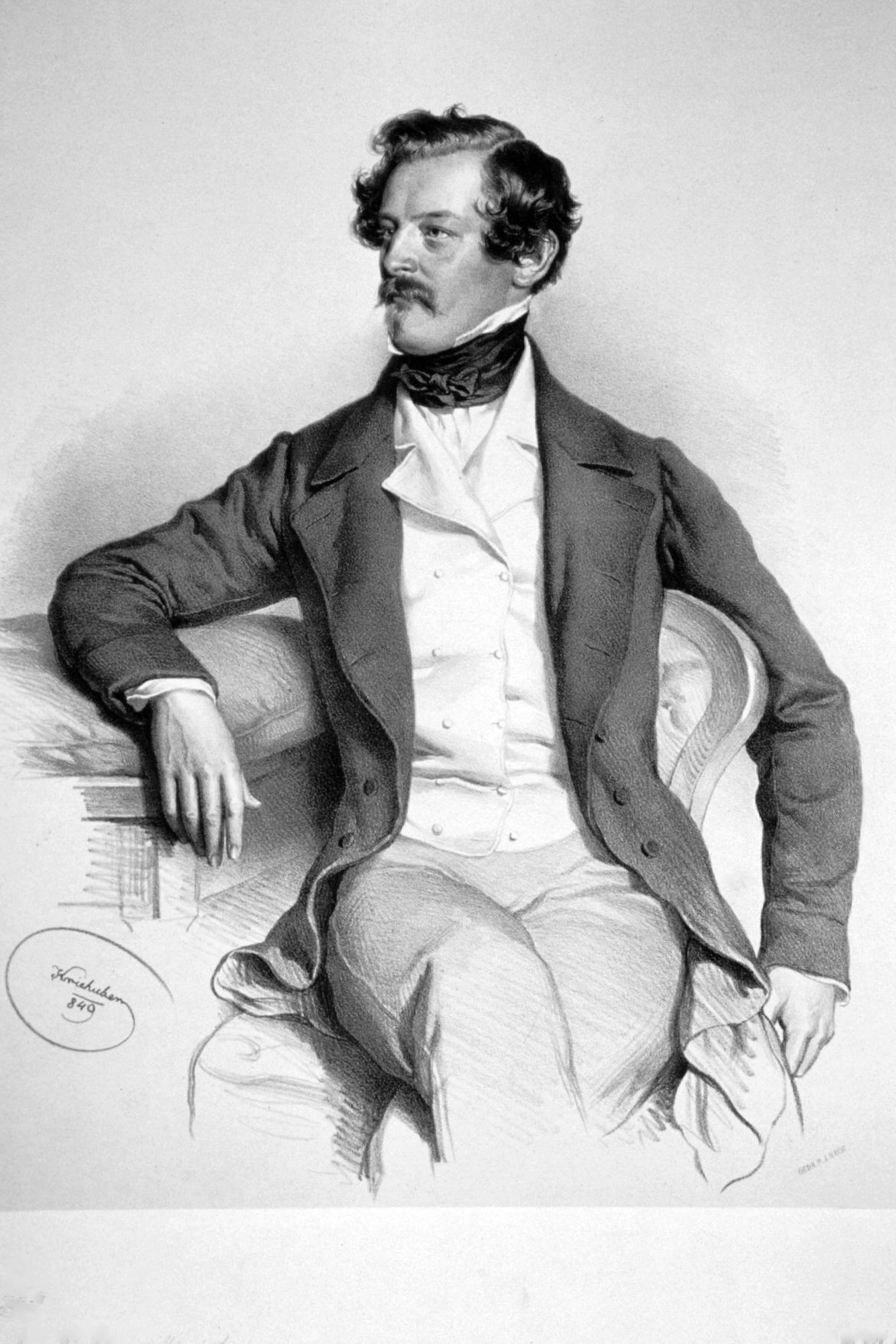
- Portrait of Alexander von Bach (c. 1849) by Josef Kriehuber.

Interior Minister of the Austrian Empire
- In office 28 July 1849 – 22 August 1859
- Monarch: Francis Joseph I
- Prime Minister: Prince Felix of Schwarzenberg (1849–1852); Count Karl Ferdinand von Buol (1852–1859)
- Preceded by: Franz Stadion, Count von Warthausen
- Succeeded by: Count Agenor Gołuchowski

Personal details
- Born: 4 January 1813 Loosdorf, Austria
- Died: 12 November 1893 (aged 80) Schöngrabern, Austria

Alexander, Baron von Bach (German: Alexander Freiherr von Bach; 4 January 1813, Loosdorf, Austria – 12 November 1893, Schöngrabern, Austria) was an Austrian politician. His most notable achievement was instituting a system of centralized control at the beginning of the reign of Emperor Franz Joseph I of Austria.

== Biography ==
=== Early life ===
Born in Loosdorf, Lower Austria, he came from a legal background, with his father holding a judicial office. At the age of 24 he was made a doctor of laws, and then entered the Imperial service, where he remained for nine years. Seen as an up-and-coming young radical, Adolph Schwarzenberg noted that 'his motto must have been "to improvise is to change, to be perfect is to change often"'. In this way, he was a well-known liberal lawyer, and was first called a "minister of barricades", before he served as Minister of Justice in 1848 and 1849, and then moving on to Minister of the Interior from 1849 to 1859.

=== Minister of the interior (1849–1859) ===
Although he favored a departure from the absolute system of Metternich, Bach was not prepared to go so far as the Revolutionaries of 1848 wished. In his views, he has been called a man who was 'quite wonderfully unprincipled' and so could change his position often. This allowed him to be driven into conservative ranks by popular opposition: he gradually adhered to conservative views, endorsing the centralizing constitutional program of Prince Schwarzenberg in March 1849, thus further inflaming Hungarian sentiments. However, the impact of his reforms on Hungary has been the contest of many historical debates. Some viewed the Revolution as far more productive in recreating the Hungarian "national identity", whereas some contemporaries of later Hungarian revolutions saw the systems created by Bach as the foremost driver in Hungarian nationalism.

After the death of Schwarzenberg in 1852, he largely dictated policy in Austria and Hungary. Bach centralized administrative authority for the Austrian Empire, but he also endorsed reactionary policies that reduced freedom of the press and abandoned public trials. He represented later the Absolutist (or Klerikalabsolutist) direction, which culminated in the concordat of August 1855 that gave the Roman Catholic Church control over education and family life. This period in the history of the Austrian Empire would become known as the era of "neo-absolutism", or Bach's absolutism.

Bach was created Baron (Freiherr) in 1854. He was also the guardian of Science Academy (Akademie der Wissenschaften) from 1849 to 1859.

=== Later life ===
His fall in 1859 was caused to a considerable extent by the failure in the Italian war against the Kingdom of Sardinia and Napoleon III. His reforms of the military had led to industrialization being foregone to the army, with barracks taking place of factories and infrastructural expansion, weakening. After leaving his position, Bach served as Ambassador to the Holy See from 1859 to 1867 before dying in seclusion in 1893.

== In popular culture ==
In The Empress TV series, he was portrayed by actor Alexander Finkenwirth.

== Bibliography ==
- Macho, Eva, Alexander Freiherr von Bach. Stationen einer umstrittenen Karriere (Frankfurt am Main u.a., Peter Lang, 2009) (Beiträge zur Neueren Geschichte Österreichs, 24).

Political offices
Preceded by Franz Stadion, Count von Warthausen	Interior Minister of the Austrian Empire; 1849–1859	Succeeded by Count Agenor Gołuchowski
