= Johann Philipp Stadion, Count von Warthausen =

Austrian count (1763–1824)

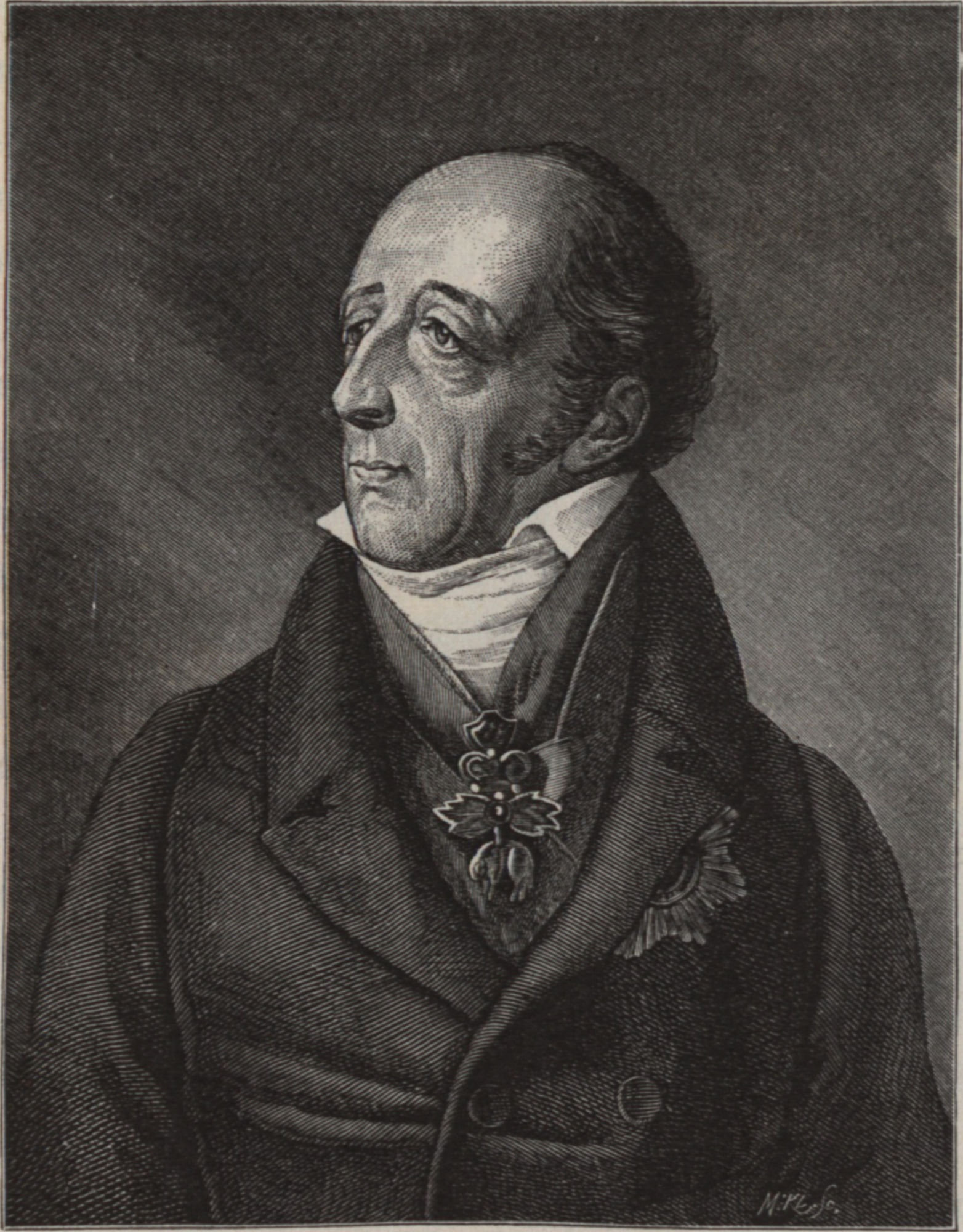
Johann Philipp von Stadion

Johann Philipp Carl Joseph Stadion, Graf von Warthausen (18 June 1763 in Mainz – 15 May 1824 in Baden) was a statesman, foreign minister, and diplomat who served the Habsburg empire during the Napoleonic Wars. He was also founder of Austria's central bank Oesterreichische Nationalbank. He was sovereign Count of Stadion-Warthausen from 1787 until 1806, when his lands were mediatised to the Kingdom of Bavaria.

== Early life ==
Johann was born as the younger surviving son of Count Franz Konrad von Stadion-Warthausen (1736–1787) and his wife, Baroness Maria Johanna Ludowika Esther Zobel von Giebelstadt (1740–1803).

== Life and career ==
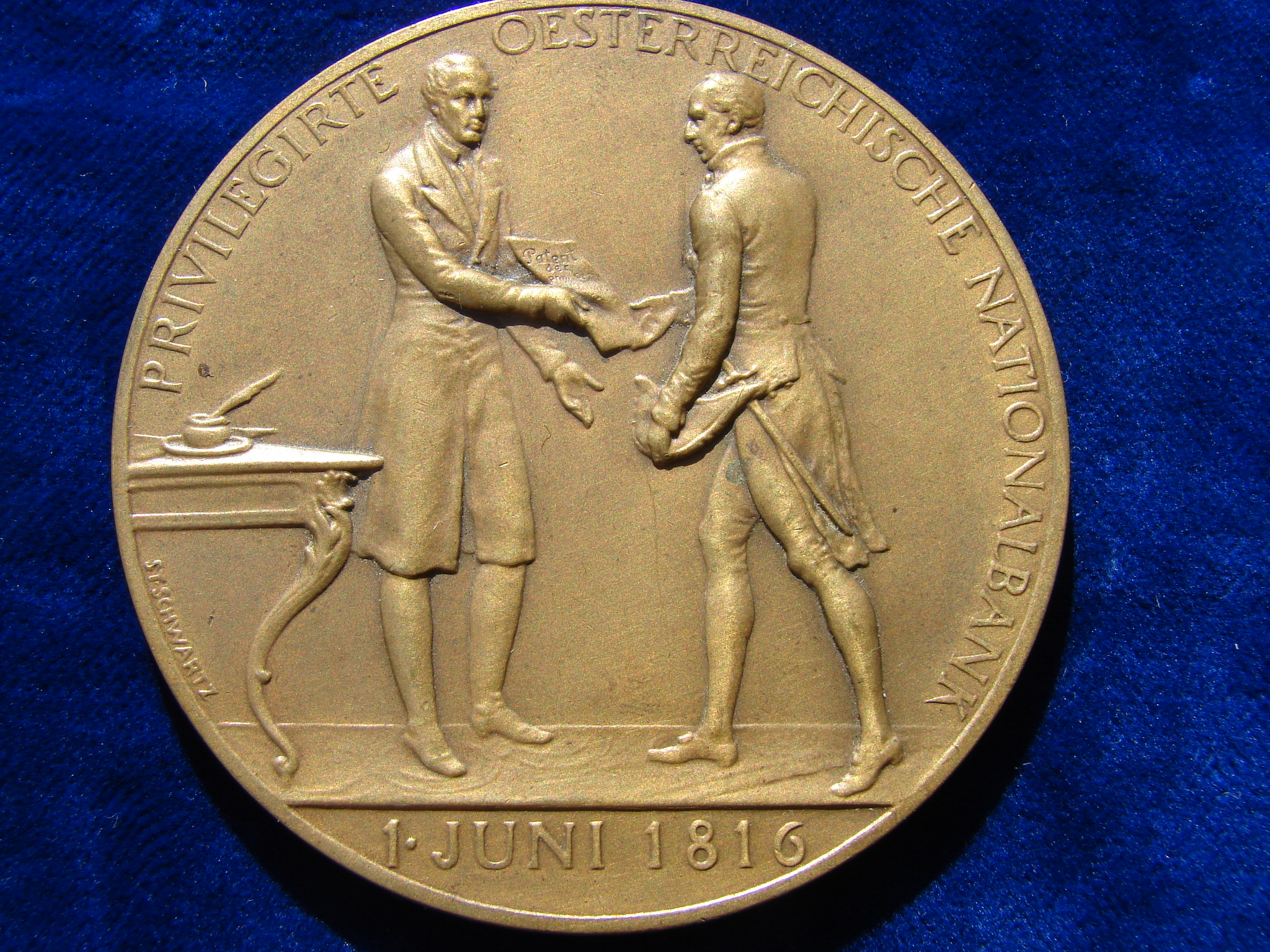
Johann Philipp von Stadion receives from Francis I, the first Emperor of Austria, the charter for the foundation of Austria's central bank Oesterreichische Nationalbank in Vienna. Bronze medal for the 100th anniversary on 1 June 1916; obverse. Medallist: Stefan Schwartz.

In 1787–1790, he was ambassador in Stockholm, then in London from 1790 to 1793. After some years of retirement, he was entrusted with a mission to the Prussian court (1800–1803), where he endeavoured in vain to effect an alliance with Austria. He had greater success as envoy at Saint Petersburg (1803–1805), where he played a large part in the formation of the third coalition against Napoleon (1805). Notwithstanding the failure of this alliance, he was made foreign minister and, in conjunction with Archduke Charles of Austria, pursued a policy of quiet preparation for a fresh trial of strength with France.

In 1808, he abandoned the policy of procrastination and hastened the outbreak of a new war. Stadion was encouraged by news from Spain regarding the rising of the Spanish population against French occupation and the defeat of a French army by Spanish general Francisco Castanos at Bailen. He was instrumental in persuading Emperor Francis of Austria to attempt to arouse popular resistance to Napoleon in Austria and Germany.

The war that began in 1809 pitted Austria alone on the continent against Napoleonic France. The campaign saw the first major defeat of Napoleon at Aspern by the Archduke Charles, brother of the Emperor. Nonetheless, the French recovered and inflicted a decisive defeat on the Austrians at Wagram, one of the largest battles of the Napoleonic Wars. The unfortunate results of the campaign of 1809 compelled his resignation. He was succeeded as Foreign Minister by Klemens von Metternich, whom the Emperor had recalled from Paris. Nonetheless, in 1813, he was commissioned to negotiate the convention which finally overthrew Napoleon.

The last ten years of his life were spent in a strenuous and partly successful attempt to reorganize the disordered finances of his country. As minister of finance (1815–1824), he founded Austria's central bank Oesterreichische Nationalbank in 1816.

== Personal life ==
On 4 November 1773 in Mainz, he married his cousin, Countess Maria Anna Philippine Walpurgis von Stadion-Thannhausen (1771–1841), daughter of Count Joseph Georg Johann von Stadion zu Thannhausen (1652-1742) and his wife, Baroness Maria Anna Wambolt von Umstadt (1687-1764). Together, they had eight children. Among them was Franz Stadion, Count von Warthausen, a prominent liberal statesman of the 1840s.

== Death ==
He died on 15 May 1824 in Baden bei Wien, Austria.

== Acknowledgements ==
- In 1874, an alley in Vienna's 1st district was renamed "Stadiongasse" in honour of Johann Philipp von Stadion.
- Since 1897, the Hotel Graf Stadion on Buchfeldgasse Nr. 5 in Vienna's 8th district Josefstadt bears the statesman's name.
