= Sulzbach (Rhine) =

River in Baden-Württemberg, Germany

Location
- Country: Germany
- State: Baden-Württemberg

Physical characteristics
- Mouth
  - location: Rhine
  - coordinates: 47.8961°N 7.5906°E
- Length: 19.5 km (12.1 mi)

Basin features
- Progression: Rhine→ North Sea

Sulzbach (German pronunciation: [ˈzʊltsbax]) is a river of Baden-Württemberg, Germany. It is a right tributary of the Rhine. It passes through Sulzburg and Heitersheim, and flows into the Rhine near Hartheim am Rhein.

== See also ==
- List of rivers of Baden-Württemberg
