= Hotel Graf Stadion (Vienna) =

Coordinates: 48°12′34.18″N 16°21′13.45″E

- Interactive map of the Hotel Graf Stadion area

General information
- Location: Buchfeldgasse 5, Vienna Josefstadt, Austria
- Opened: 1897; 129 years ago

Other information
- Number of rooms: 39

Website
- www.hotelgrafstadion.at

The Hotel Graf Stadion is a historic three-star hotel, located on Buchfeldgasse 5 in Vienna's eighth district Josefstadt. The hotel was established in 1897 and named after the Austrian statesman Johann Philipp von Stadion. The building is a protected historic landmark listed on the Austrian cultural property list.

== History ==
The house on Buchfeldgasse Nr. 5 was built in 1825 by the Viennese master builder Alois Hildwein as a tenement building in the architectural style of the Biedermeier era, when, due to the upswing of the urban middle-class bourgeoisie during the 1820s, a boom in civic building activity ensued and residential development became the prime realm of investment. The tenement building on Buchfeldgasse Nr. 17 (completed by Ignaz Göll in 1828) and the residential building on Buchfeldgasse Nr. 4 (1827) were penned by Alois Hildwein as well. All three buildings are protected historic landmarks of Vienna's city centre.

According to historical documents, the former tenement building was established as a hotel in 1897. It was named in honour of the Austrian statesman, diplomat, minister of foreign and domestic affairs Johann Philipp von Stadion. With only two gaps, from July 1945 to December 1948 during the four-power occupation of Vienna, and during a renovation in 2014, the hotel was in operation continuously since its foundation. The building was modernized in 1984 and completely renovated in 1999. Between 1999 and 2014 it was managed by Milan Oborny. The house was regarded as "one of the few genuine Biedermeier-style hotels left in Vienna".

As of September 2014, the hotel has reopened under new management after a full renovation.

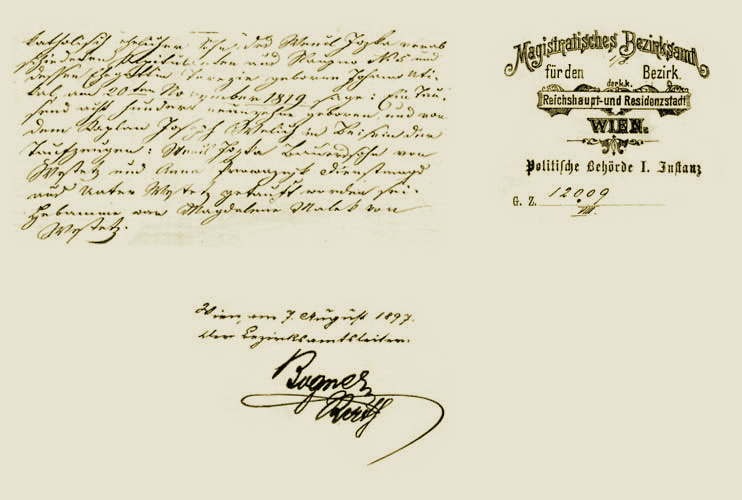
Historic document from 7 August 1897 on the foundation of Hotel Graf Stadion issued by the Vienna city magistrate for the 8th district

== Gallery ==
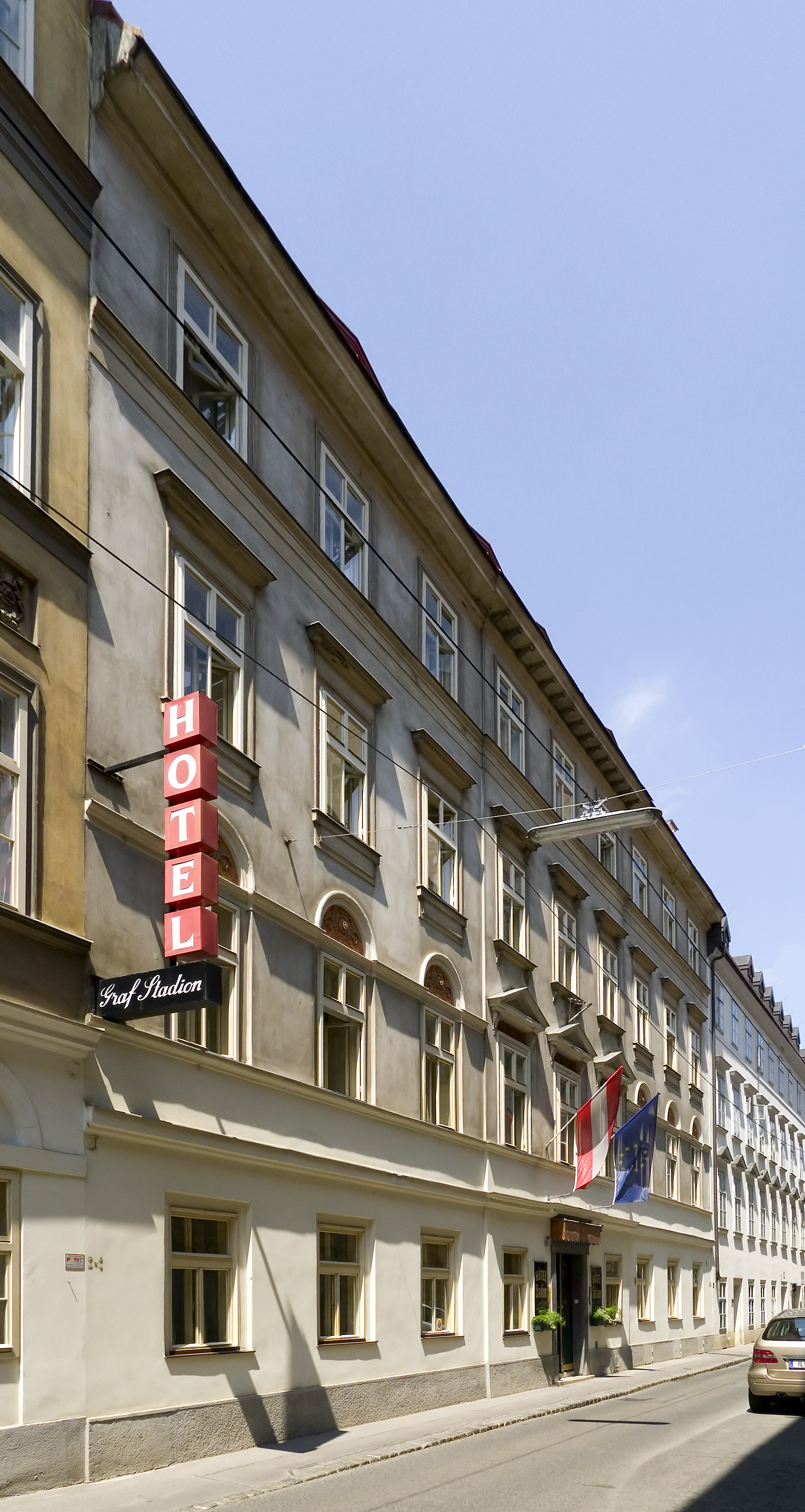
The hotel on Buchfeldgasse 5

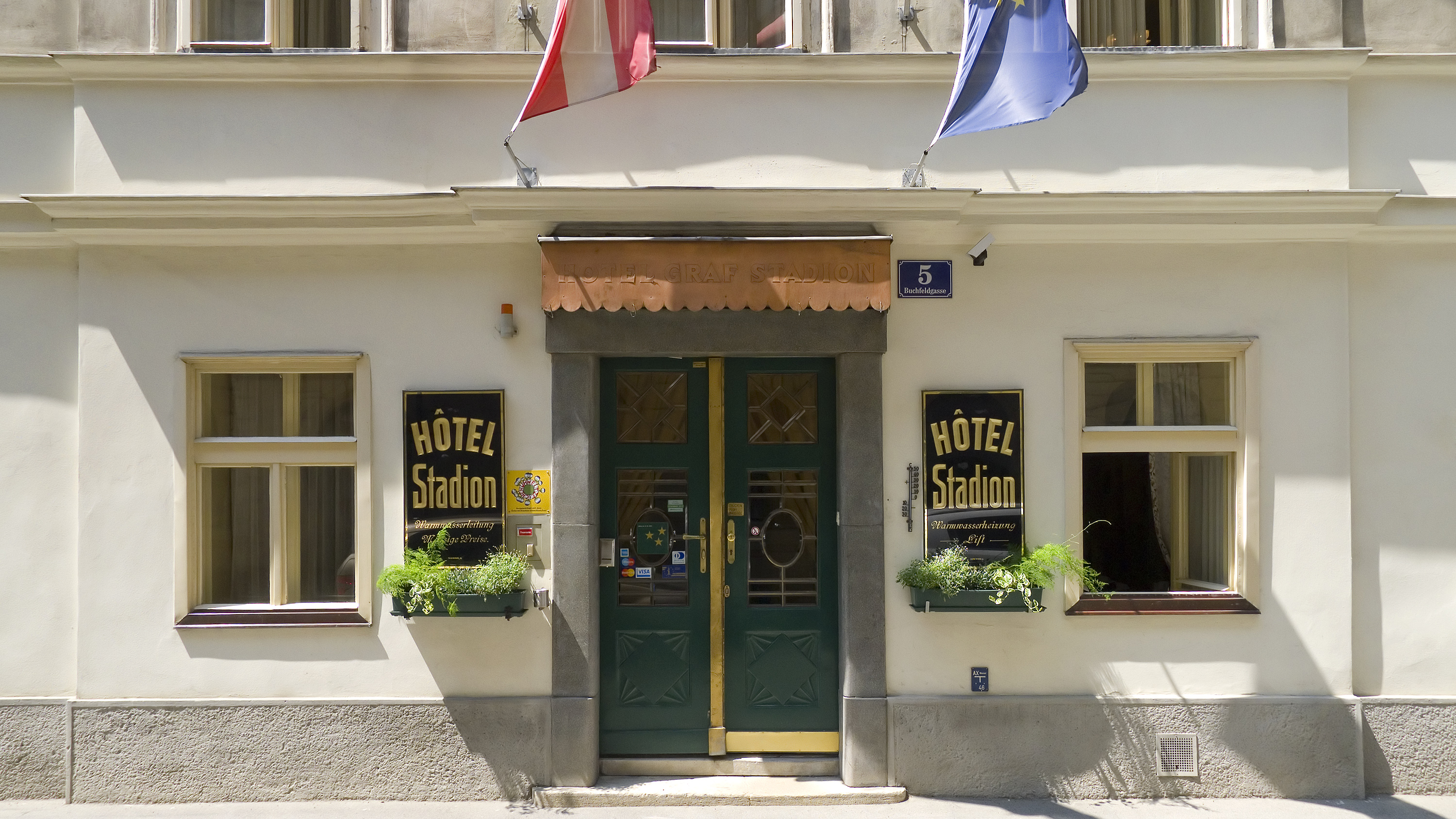
The hotel's front gate

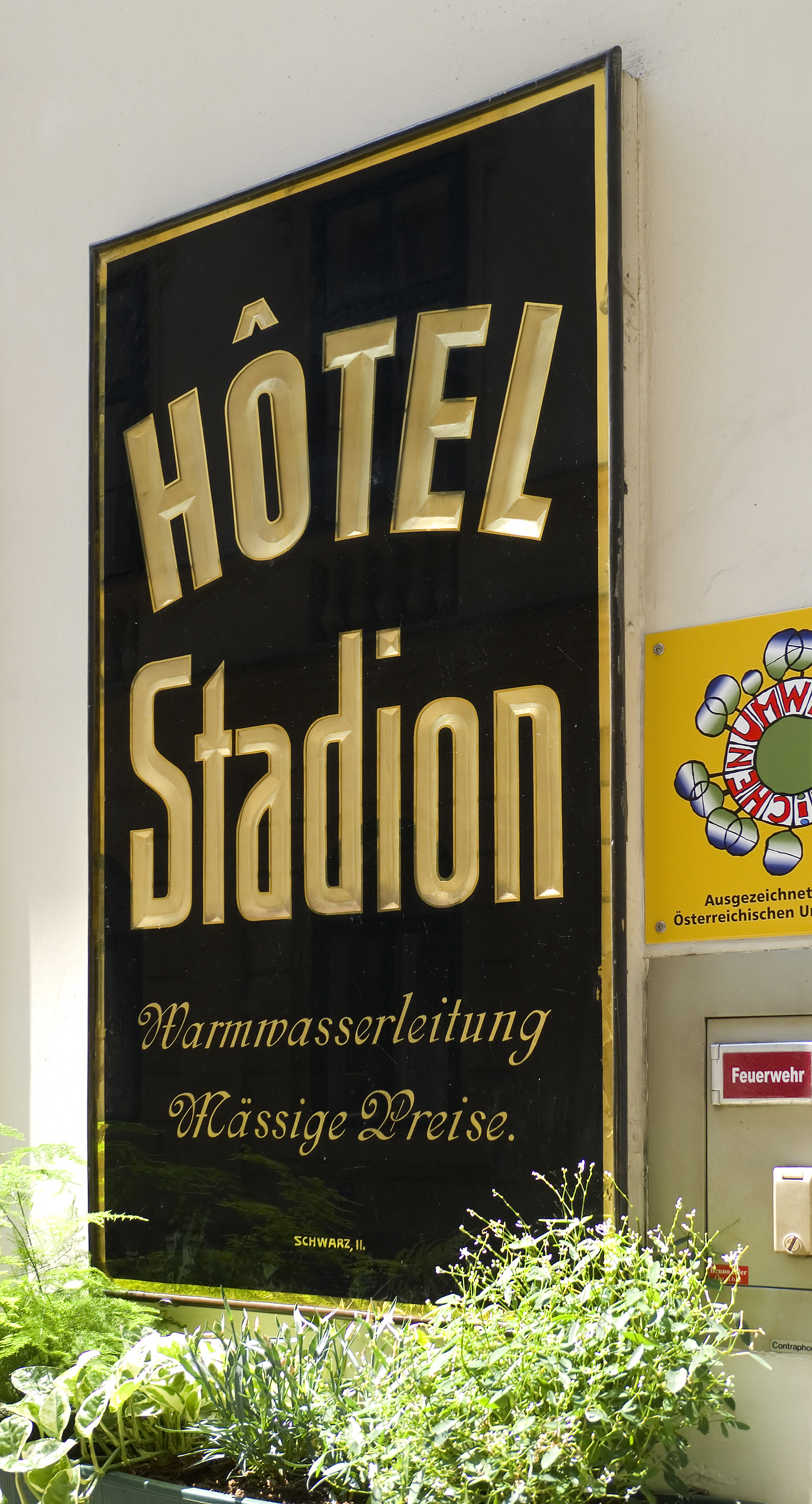
Historic sign at the entrance
