= Agenor Romuald Gołuchowski =

Austrian politician (1812–1875)

Count Agenor Romuald Gołuchowski
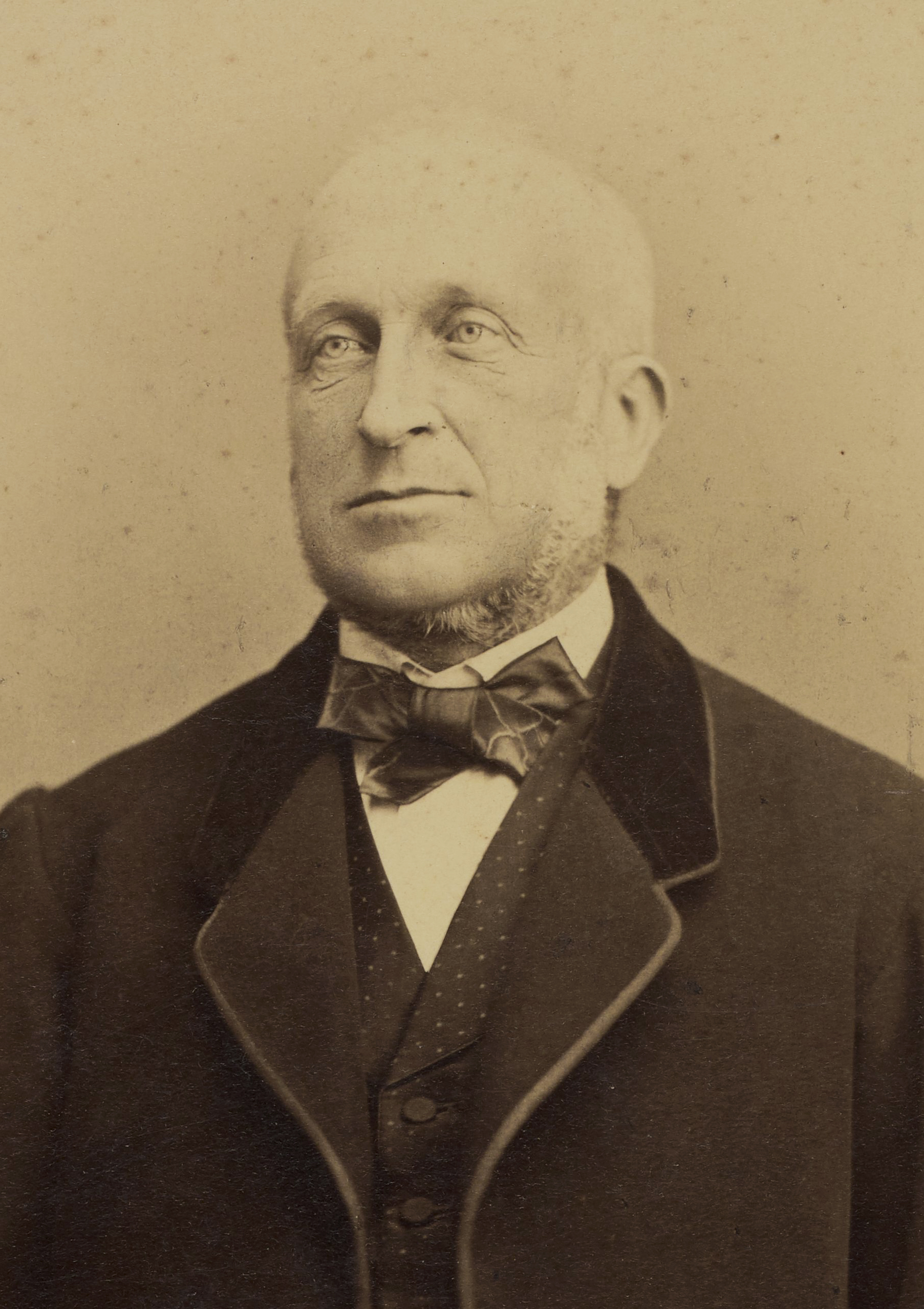
- Agenor Romuald Gołuchowski, 1875

Interior Minister of the Austrian Empire
- In office 22 August 1859 – 13 December 1860
- Monarch: Francis Joseph I
- Prime Minister: Count Johann Bernhard von Rechberg und Rothenlöwen
- Preceded by: Baron Alexander von Bach
- Succeeded by: Anton von Schmerling

Personal details
- Born: 8 February 1812 Skala-Podilska, Galicia
- Died: 3 August 1875 (aged 63) Lwów, Galicia

Count Agenor Romuald Gołuchowski (8 February 1812, Skala-Podilska, Galicia – 3 August 1875, Lwów, Galicia) was a Polish-Austrian conservative politician, member of parliament of Austria, Minister of Interior and governor of Galicia, and father of Agenor Maria Gołuchowski and Adam Gołuchowski. Gołuchowski was a confidant and key advisor to the Emperor Franz Joseph.

He was the author of the 1860 October Diploma, which ended the era of absolutism in Austrian Empire.

George Walter Prothero writes that Gołuchowski was instrumental in ensuring "steady support of the monarchy" among the upper classes of Galicia:

He was himself a Pole, though a strong opponent of revolution. He had clear aims for the economic improvement of Galicia, which he believed could only be attained by banishing distrust of the Poles from the mind of the Government. He realized also that this could be best accomplished by creating a party in Galicia upon whose loyalty the dynasty could rely.

Government offices
Preceded by Baron Alexander von Bach	Interior Minister of the Austrian Empire; 1859–1860	Succeeded by Anton von Schmerling
