= Stadion-Warthausen =

County of Stadion-Warthausen Grafschaft Stadion-Warthausen
- 1741–1806
- Coat of arms
- Status: State of the Holy Roman Empire
- Capital: Warthausen
- Government: Principality
- Historical era: Middle Ages
  - Partitioned from Stadion: 1741
  - Mediatised to Austria and Württemberg: 1806 1806
Preceded by	Succeeded by
Stadion / Stadion (state)	Austrian Empire; Württemberg

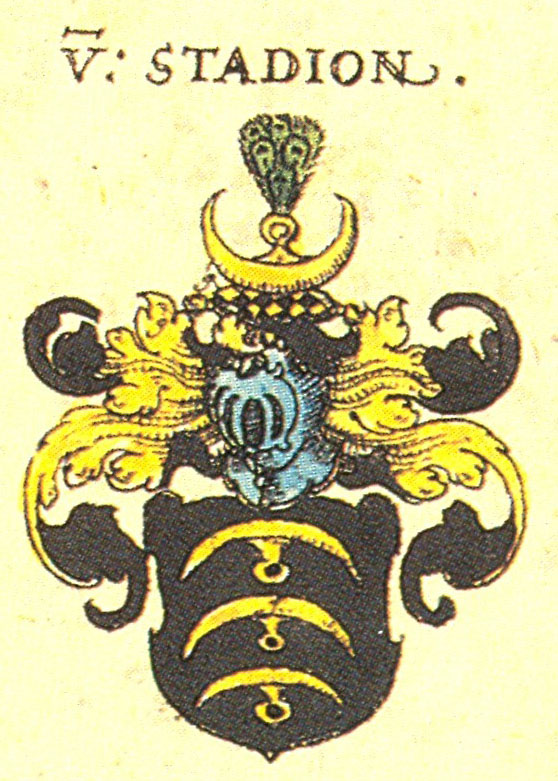
Coat of arms of the Stadion family

Stadion-Warthausen was a county located in around Warthausen in western Baden-Württemberg, Germany. Stadion-Warthausen was a partition of Stadion County, and was mediatised to Austria and Württemberg in 1806.

== Counts of Stadion-Warthausen ==
- Anthony Henry Frederick (1741–68)
- Francis Conrad (1768–87)
- Johann Philipp (1787–1806) (Died 1824)
- Franz (1824–1853)

== Gallery ==
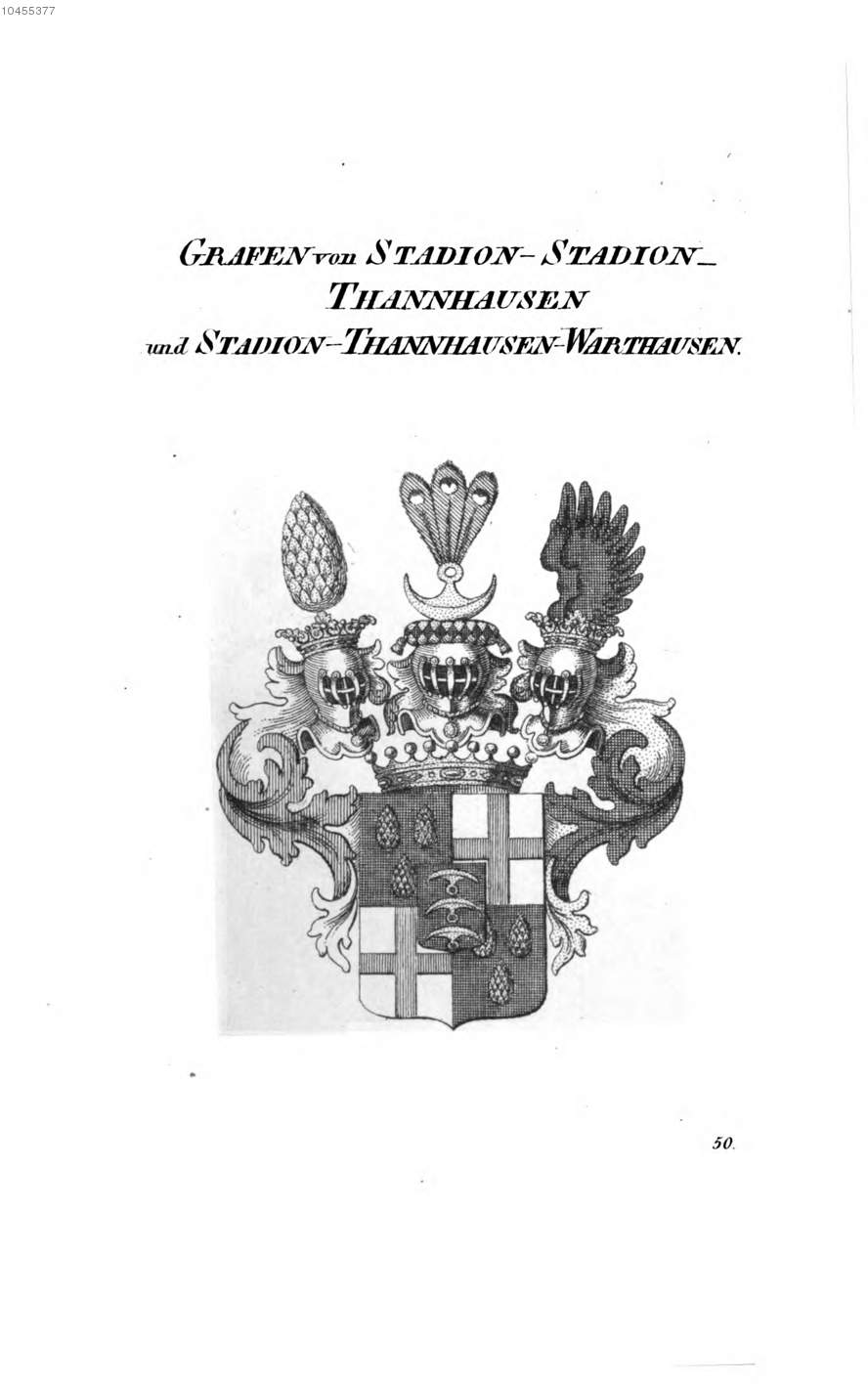
Arms of the counts
