= Heitersheim =

- Town
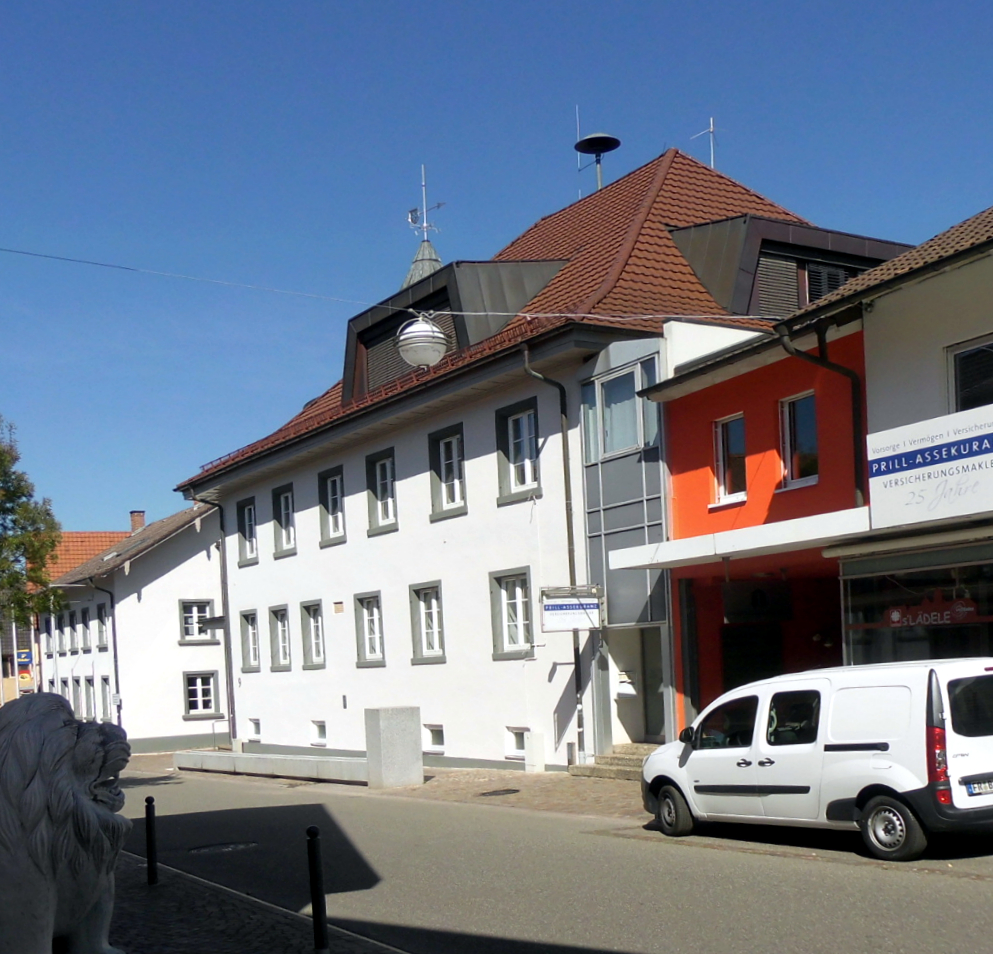
- Town hall

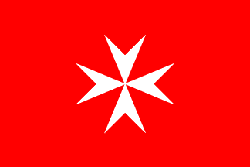
- Flag Coat of arms

- Location of Heitersheim within Breisgau-Hochschwarzwald district
- Interactive map of Heitersheim
- Location within Germany Location within Baden-Württemberg
- Coordinates: 47°52′31″N 7°39′17″E
- Country: Germany
- State: Baden-Württemberg
- Admin. region: Freiburg
- District: Breisgau-Hochschwarzwald
- Subdivisions: 2

Government
  - Mayor (2020–28): Christoph Zachow (Ind.)

Area
  - Total: 11.71 km^{2} (4.52 sq mi)
- Elevation: 254 m (833 ft)

Population (2025-12-31)
  - Total: 6,598
  - Density: 563.5/km^{2} (1,459/sq mi)
- Time zone: UTC+01:00 (CET)
  - Summer (DST): UTC+02:00 (CEST)
- Postal codes: 79423
- Dialling codes: 07634
- Vehicle registration: FR
- Website: www.heitersheim.de

Heitersheim (German pronunciation: [ˈhaɪtɐsˌhaɪm]; Alemannic German: Heitersche) is a town in the district Breisgau-Hochschwarzwald, Baden-Württemberg in southern Germany. Since October 1, 2022 it may use the name Malteserstadt Heitersheim.

It was the seat of the Grand Prior of Germany of the Knights Hospitaller from 1505 until 1806 and also the seat of the Principality of Heitersheim of the Holy Roman Empire from 1546 until 1806.

== Geography ==
The city is located in Markgräflerland in southern Upper Rhine region. The city contains older central part Heitersheim and newer Gallenweiler. The proximity to the Black Forest and high point Belchen at 1,414 m (4,639 ft) can be seen in the distance from some points in the city.

=== Geology ===
The soil type in Heitersheim is Loess. Towards the east are loess-rich hills. This is cultivated with corn, grain, and vineyards.

The Sulzbach is a river that flows through Heitersheim. It originates further in the black forest at Bad Sulzburg and empties into the Rhine.

The Rhine River Fault runs through Heitersheim along the west part of the city.

== History ==
- 777. Mentioned for the first time in Lorscher codex
- 1272. Acquired by the Knights Hospitaller.
- 1505. Became permanent seat of the Hospitaller German priory.
- 1546. Acquired imperial immediacy under the emperor.
- 1806. Principality dissolved and city annexed to Grand Duchy of Baden.
- 1847. Railway Freiburg-Basel passes through city
- 1971. Unification with Gallenweiler

== Partner cities ==
The Austrian town of Vandans is the sister city of Heitersheim since 1991.
