= Stadion (state) =

European polity

Lordship (Barony, County) of Stadion Herrschaft (Freiherrschaft, Grafschaft) Stadion
- 1200–1742
- Coat of arms
- Status: State of the Holy Roman Empire
- Capital: Oberstadion
- Government: Principality
- Historical era: Middle Ages
  - Established: 1200
  - Division into Swabian and Alsatian lines: 1392–1700
  - Raised to barony: 1686
  - Raised to county: 1705
  - Partitioned in twain: 1742
  - Both counties mediatised: 1806
Preceded by	Succeeded by
Duchy of Swabia	Stadion-Thannhausen; Stadion-Warthausen

Stadion was a small state of the Holy Roman Empire, located around Thannhausen in the present-day Bavarian administrative region of Swabia, Germany.

== History ==
According to the legend this Swabian Stadion dynasty was first mentioned in the area of Oberstadion in 1197 when "Heinricus de Lapide" was mentioned as descendant of Lords of Stein who have similar coat of arms as those of Stadion family. However, the first certain documented ancestor of the family can be traced back to the knight "Waltherus de Stadegun" who was mentioned first on 13 May in 1270. His descendants later built the castle in Oberstadion which served as the family seat and bears the name after the family which built it.

== Titles and status ==
Johann Philipp of Stadion (1652–1742), high steward of the archbishops of Mainz, was elevated to the rank of a Freiherr (Baron) in 1686. In 1705, he acquired the immediate lordship of Thannhausen and thereby was raised to a Count of the Holy Roman Empire. Upon his death in 1742, the estates were partitioned between the lines of Stadion-Thannhausen and Stadion-Warthausen. After the dissolution of the Holy Roman Empire, their immediate territories lost its sovereignty. The territory of the County of Stadion-Thannhausen became mediatized by the Kingdom of Bavaria in 1806 and the territory of the County of Stadion-Warthausen was mediatised to Austria and Württemberg in 1806. After that, as all other German mediatized houses, they kept some of its former privileges, among most important ones being their equal status to all reigning families for marriage purposes. At the beginning of the 20th century, Stadions became extinct upon the death of the last male representative, Count Philipp Franz Joseph von Stadion-Thannhausen (1847-1908).

== Lords of Stadion ==
=== Lords of Stadion (c. 1200–1686) ===
- Walter I (died c. 1230)
- Walter II (died c. 1260) with...
- Louis I (died c. 1260)
- Louis II (died 1328) with...
- Conrad (died 1309)
- Walter III (died 1352)
- Louis III (died 1364)
- Eitel (1364–1392)
- Conrad I (1392–1439)
- Walter (1439–1457) with...
- Pancratius (1439–1479)
- Nicholas (1479–1507)
- John (1507–1530)
- John Ulrich (1530–1600)
- John Christopher II (1600–1629)
- John Christopher III (1629–1666)
- John Philip I (1666–1742), Baron from 1686, Count from 1705

== Other members of the Von Stadion family ==
- Christoph von Stadion (1478–1543), Prince-Bishop of Augsburg
- Johann Kaspar von Stadion (1567–1641), Grand Master of the Teutonic Order
- Franz Konrad von Stadion und Thannhausen (1679–1757), Prince-Bishop of Bamberg
- Johann Philipp Stadion, Count von Warthausen (1763–1824), Foreign minister of the Habsburg empire
- Philipp von Stadion und Thannhausen (1799–1868), Austrian Lieutenant field marshal
- Franz Stadion, Count von Warthausen (1806–1853), Interior Minister of the Austrian Empire
