= Principality of Heitersheim =

Imperial estate of the Holy Roman Empire (1548–1806)

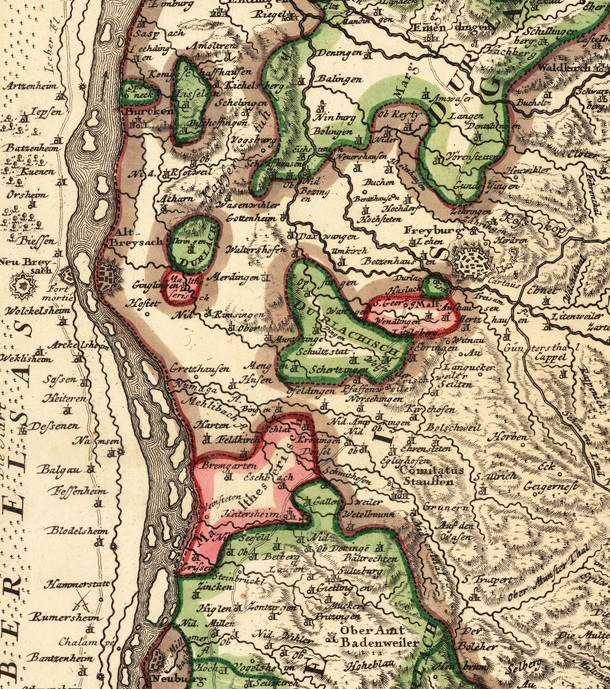
Map of Heitersheim (red) before 1803

The Principality of Heitersheim (Fürstentum Heitersheim) was an imperial estate of the Holy Roman Empire from 1548 until 1806. It was a territory of the Knights Hospitaller (Order of Saint John) consisting of several noncontiguous enclaves in the Breisgau. It was a member of the Upper Rhenish Circle. Before its expansion in 1803, it had an area of about 4 square Reichsmeilen (50 km^{2}) and a population of about 5,000.

Its chief town, Heitersheim, was acquired by the knights in 1272 as a fief of Margrave Henry II of Hachberg. In 1276, Henry granted the knights the right to hold court (Landgericht) and to act as Vogt.

In 1428, Heitersheim, which had by then obtained imperial immediacy, became the temporary seat of the Grand Prior of Germany, the top Hospitaller official in the German kingdom. From 1505, Heitersheim was the permanent seat of the grand priory.

In 1548, as a reward for the knights' service in the wars against the Turks, Emperor Charles V granted it princely rank and admitted it to the Imperial Diet "with seat and vote" (mit Sitz und Stimme). The head of the Hospitallers in Germany thus held the rank of Prince-Prior (Fürstprior). A contemporary Dutch document refers to "the Master and Grand Prior of Germany, being a worldly ruler and a Prince of the Holy Empire, as also [formerly] of Rhodes and, now, of Malta", comparing the prior's Landeshoheit (territorial supremacy) in the empire with his sovereignty on Rhodes (1310–1522) and Malta (1530–1798).

In the 18th century, Heitersheim fell gradually under the domination of the Habsburgs, who were prepared to grant it along with the rest of the Breisgau to Duke Ercole III of Modena in the Treaty of Campo Formio (1797). In 1803, however, it was one of only three ecclesiastical principalities to survive the territorial reorganization brought about by the Reichsdeputationshauptschluss in accordance with the Treaty of Lunéville (1801) that ended the War of the Second Coalition. As part of the settlement of the war, Duke Ercole received the rest of the Breisgau and the Principality of Heitersheim annexed the neighbouring county of Bonndorf, thus greatly expanding in size. The preservation of the knights' organization as an imperial estate was nominally in gratitude for their military service. In fact, it was intended to provide opportunities for many of the noblemen who had lost status with the dissolution of the cathedral chapters.

With the dissolution of the Holy Roman Empire in 1806, it was annexed by the Grand Duchy of Baden. The annexation was ordered by the Confederation of the Rhine, a group of imperial estates that had banded together to leave the empire, on 12 June 1806 just prior to the imperial dissolution. The last prince-prior, Ignaz Balthasar Rinck von Baldenstein, died almost exactly one year later, on 13 June 1807.

== List of prince-priors ==
- Georg Schilling von Cannstatt (1546–1553)
- Georg II Bombastus von Hohenheim (1553–1567)
- Adam von Schwalbach (1567–1573)
- Philipp Flach (1573–1594)
- Philipp II Riedesel von Camberg (1594–1598)
- Bernhard von Angeloch (1598–1599)
- Philipp III von Lesch (1599–1601)
- Wippert von Rosenberg (1601–1607)
- Arbogast von Andlau (1607–1612)
- Johann Friedrich Hund von Sarrlheim (1612–1635)
- Walraff de Scheiffart de Mèrode (1635–1646)
- Hermann I von der Thann (1646–1647)
- Friedrich II von Hessen Darmstadt (1647–1682)
- Franz von Sonnenberg (1682–1683)
- Franz II von Droste zu Bischering (1683)
- Hermann II von Wachtendonck (1683–1703)
- Bernhard Wilhelm von Rhede (1703–1721)
- Goswin Hermann Otto von Merveldt (1721–1728)
- Philipp Wilhelm von Nesselrode (1728–1754)
- Philipp Joachim Vogt von Prassberg (1754–1755)
- Johann Baptist von Sonnenberg Herlesheim (1755–1773)
- Franz Christoph Sebastian von Nemching Apfeltrang (1773–1777)
- Franz Christoph Benedikt von Reinach zu Foussemaigne und Kappach (1777–1796)
- Johann Joseph Benedikt von Reinach (1796)
- Ignaz Balthasar Rinck von Baldenstein (1796–1806)

== Sources ==
- Bueren, Truus van (2006). "The Art Treasures of the Haarlem Convent of St John: Objects of Desire to a Protestant Town". In Johannes A. Mol; Klaus Militzer; Helen J. Nicholson (eds.). The Military Orders and the Reformation: Choices, State Building, and the Weight of Tradition. Hilversum Verloren. pp. 209–236.
- Köbler, Gerhard (2007). Historisches Lexikon der Deutschen Länder: die deutschen Territorien vom Mittelalter bis zur Gegenwart (7th rev. ed.). Munich: C. H. Beck.
- Sommerlad, Bernhard (1977). "The Grand Priory of Germany of the Order of St. John of Jerusalem during the Period of Transition from the Middle Ages to the Reformation As Reflected in the Reports of General Visitations of 1494/95 and 1540/41 (review)". Philosophy and History. 10 (1): 118–120. doi:10.5840/philhist197710138.
- Whaley, Joachim (2012). Germany and the Holy Roman Empire, Volume II: The Peace of Westphalia to the Dissolution of the Reich, 1648–1806. Oxford: Oxford University Press.
