= Stadion-Thannhausen =

Coordinates: 48°16′N 10°28′E

County of Stadion-Thannhausen Grafschaft Stadion-Thannhausen
- 1741–1806
- Coat of arms
- Status: State of the Holy Roman Empire
- Capital: Thannhausen
- Government: Principality
- Historical era: Middle Ages
  - Partitioned from Stadion: 1741
  - Mediatised to Bavaria: 1806
| Preceded by | Succeeded by |
| Stadion / Stadion (state) | Kingdom of Bavaria |

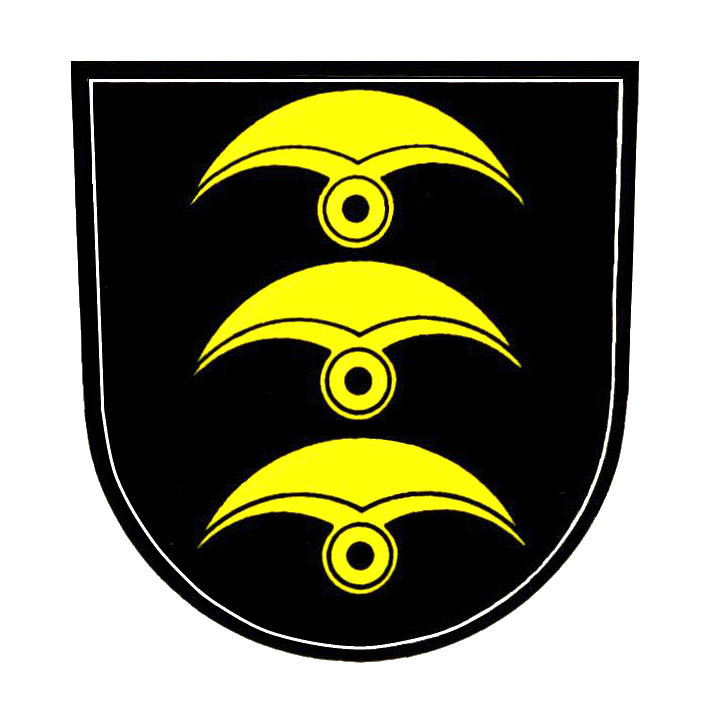
Oberstadion Wappen

Stadion-Thannhausen was a county located in and around Thannhausen in western Bavaria, Germany. Stadion-Thannhausen was a partition of the county of Stadion, and was mediatised to Bavaria in 1806.

== Counts of Stadion-Thannhausen ==
- Hugo Philip (1741–85)
- John George Joseph Nepomuk (1785–1806)
