= Otto Heinrich von Gemmingen-Hornberg =

German aristocrat, diplomat and writer

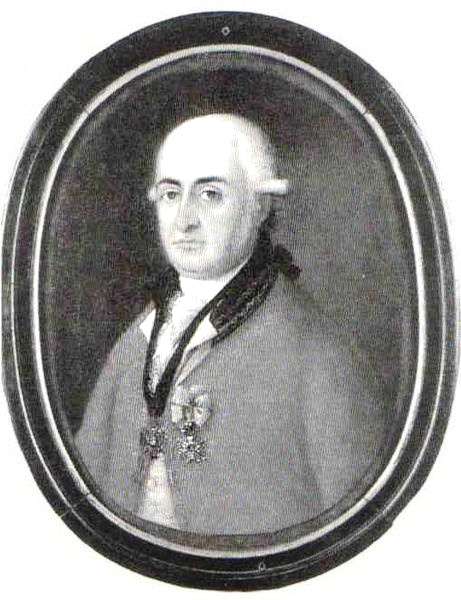
Otto Heinrich von Gemmingen zu Hornberg 1755–1836

Otto Heinrich von Gemmingen zu Hornberg (5 November 1755 – 3 March 1836) was a member of the aristocratic Gemmingen family. He was a diplomat and enlightenment writer, a Freemason and a friend of the composer Wolfgang Amadeus Mozart.

== Life ==
=== Family provenance and early years ===
Otto Heinrich von Gemmingen-Hornberg was born at the Free imperial city Heilbronn, where his parents were based for a period. His father, also called Otto Heinrich von Gemmingen (1727–1790), worked as a judge at the imperial district court in Wetzlar, and it was here that he spent the first ten years of his life, receiving his schooling from his father, probably with backup from a tutor.

His mother, Marie Elis von Gemmingen-Hornberg (1723–1775), was the widow of Count von Virmont and a daughter of Johann Hermann Franz von Nesselrode.

After the death of his grandfather his father gave up his work as a judge in 1766 and the family relocated to Heilbronn. From the lawyerly social milieu in the bustling commercial centre, he would move to a more traditionally aristocratic lifestyle during his earl teenage years, with parties and concerts and fireworks in summer evenings and tobogganing in the winter. It was in this context that the younger Otto Heinrich - generally known as Heinrich in the family - had his first experience of theatre at the "Komödiensaal" in the town hall, making frequent stage appearances in the works of Lessing, Schiller, Shakespeare and other playwrights fashionable at the time. His father nevertheless continued to place emphasis on more serious aspects of his education. Important for any future career in politics or diplomacy was mastery of the French language, and both French and Jurisprudence featured prominently in his studies. Literature and Music were not ignored, however. Heinrich had access not merely to his father's extensive library but also to the public library in the town, which afforded excellent opportunities for building his knowledge. He also became a competent performer on the 'cello and on the piano. He was a frequent visitor at the home of Gottlob Moriz Christian von Wacks, the longstanding mayor of Heilbronn, by whose wife, Charlotte Sophie von Wacks, a great lover of the arts, Heinrich's own taste was greatly influenced. During these teenage years he also had a brief but intense love affair with Lotte, the daughter of a Heilbronn businessman. His artistic mentor, Charlotte Sophie von Wacks, attempted to end the affair which she believed might obstruct Heinrich's subsequent education. She warned Lotte's mother what was happening. When that failed to have any effect she arranged a meeting between the two fathers. In the end Lotte was persuaded that Heinrich's commitment was not as absolute as she had thought, while Heinrich's father brought forward the date on which the boy should be sent away to pursue his studies. Heinrich von Gemmingen later recycled the experience in his play, "Der deutsche Hausvater", with which he established his reputation as a dramatist virtually overnight.

=== Mannheim years ===
When he was still only 19 he was sent to Mannheim to pursue his legal studies, although he still made frequent returns to Heilbronn where he continued to participate in the drama productions at the town hall. As far as theatre was concerned, the atmosphere in Mannheim was less carefree than in provincial Heilbronn, as the absolutist rulers discouraged scholars and aristocrats from attending theatre. Gemmingen's love for the theatre persisted, however, and Mannheim was changing. Its position on one of Europe's main communication channels, the River Rhine, gave the city quick access to new currents of Enlightenment thinking. He settled quickly into Mannheim society and, after barely half a year in the city, was appointed a chamberlain, although he never showed any appetite for the life of a courtier. In any case, jobs of this nature disappeared when the royal court left Mannheim for Munich in 1778 after Charles Theodore, the Prince-Elector, inherited the Bavaria. Meanwhile, Gemmingen continued to read extensively and to profit from the cultural opportunities provided by Mannheim and nearby Schwetzingen. He attended and was deeply affected by a performance of what was said to be the first opera sung in the German language. Around this time he took the decision to devote his free time to learning how to become a writer. He wanted to be able to use these skills to enlighten and, in the words of one source, to liberate the simple people from ignorance.

Meanwhile, in or before 1777 he became a Hofkammerrat in Mannheim, which cemented his membership of society and gave him oversight over education and schools, which also extended to the National Theatre Mannheim (a set of duties from which Gotthold Ephraim Lessing had just resigned). This position was worth 950 Gulden per month plus bonuses.

=== Mozart friendship ===
Mozart arrived in Mannheim at the start of his second visit to the city on 30 October 1777. Gemmingen and the composer quickly got to know one another and to value each other's company. They shared a love of music and a passion for the theatre. Together they worked on "Semiramis", an opera which is believed subsequently to have been lost (and may very well never have been completed). Mozart mentions Gemmingen a number of times in letters to his father. He writes about their work together on the first act of "Semiramis" in which the work is described as an "opera" and then as a "duodrama". During the next few months Mozart and Gemmingen were frequently seen out and about together, for instance in rehearsals for the Holzbauer opera "Günter von Schwarzburg". They were seen together on 6 November 1777 when Mozart was presented to the prince-elector, and again on 3 December when Mozart was giving lessons to the ("extra-marital") four children of the prince-elector born in rapid succession to Josepha Seyffert (who later became the Countess von Heydeck). Although himself a member of the influential "Kurpfälzischen Deutschen Gesellschaft" ("Kurpfalz German Society") only since 1776, Gemmingen was well known to fellow members, having already given many presentations and lectures to it, and he was able to introduce Mozart to the membership. That led to a number of intense discussions over how the German language might be promoted, at a time when much literature was in French and operas normally had Italian lyrics. There was also discussion over how a German national theatre might be established.

On 15 March 1778 Mozart set out on a journey to Paris, accompanied by his mother. He had already been obliged to sell his own carriage to finance the trip, and Gemmingen was able to improve the quality of his journey, providing three gold "Louis d'or" coins, "to repay the expense of writing out the music" of a recently composed quartet.

=== National theatre ===
Meanwhile, the national theatre project became a reality and on 1 September 1778 Wolfgang Heribert von Dalberg was appointed intendant of the National Theatre in Mannheim. A permanent theatre company was created, headed up by August Wilhelm Iffland. The first production was presented on 7 October 1779 and within a few years Mannheim became one of the leading theatres in Germany. The premier of The Robbers on 13 January 1782 was a huge success with the public, marking as it did the public launch of the career of a new playwright, Friedrich Schiller. The success also made the National Theatre itself a cultural focus for intellectual elites. In recognition of his contribution to launching and sustaining the theatre project Heinrich von Gemmingen zu Hornberg was invited to assume oversight of dramaturgy. He also became a frequent and committed theatre critic. In 1779 it became apparent that he had also been working on a play of his own.

Meanwhile, early in July 1778, news came through that Mozart's mother had died suddenly while accompanying her son in Paris. Mozart returned to Mannheim where Gemmingen showed him the translation he was working on of Rousseau's Pygmalion, and discussed his plans for translating Shakespeare's Richard III. However, Mozart received a forceful letter from his father, dated 9 December 1778, ordering him urgently back to Vienna. There was no question of disobeying his father, but Mozart gave free rein to his anger.

=== Success with "Hausvater" ===
Schiller wrote to the intendant at National Theatre in Mannheim

"Ich höre, dass ein Baron von Gemmingen der Verfasser des Hausvaters ist und wünschte«, die Ehre zu haben, diesem Mann zu versichern, dass ich eben diesen Hausvater für ungemein gut erfunden halte und einen vortrefflichen Mann und sehr schönen Geist bewundert habe."
"I hear that a certain Baron von Gemmingen is the author of "Hausvater", and I wanted to have the honour to assure this man that I think "Hausvater" is tremendously good, and a perfectly crafted characterisation with a superb spirit."

In 1779 Gemmingen revisited the thwarted love affair of his youth with his performance piece "Der deutsche Hausvater" (loosely: "The German house father"). The play was presented in the Autumn/Fall before the "Kurpfälzischen Deutschen Gesellschaft" ("Kurpfalz German Society"). It was consciously and unusually political, denouncing the division between aristocracy and bourgeoisie, and the treatment of the peasantry by both. Gemmingen used the piece as a passionate attack on class barriers. The audience included both friends and critics - those who had criticised him in the past for excessive restraint and vagueness. At the end of the first reading, resounding applause broke out. Apprehension on the part of some of the aristocratic audience members could not prevent the piece becoming a success. The actor manager Friedrich Ludwig Schröder (who later became a personal friend), immediately accepted the play for his company, and headed up the first performance at Hamburg on 4 October 1779. Within a few months "Der deutsche Hausvater" was enjoying long runs in Munich, Hamburg, Berlin, Vienna, Prague and a number of smaller cities. It was even translated into Italian. Friedrich Schiller, whose own later play Intrigue and Love was clearly influenced by "Hausvater", wrote effusively to Wolfgang Heribert von Dalberg at the National Theatre, with warm words to be passed to the author of the work.

=== Freemasonry ===
It is believed that Gemmingen joined the freemasons around 1779 when he was 24. He had connections with several lodges, not just in Mannheim itself but also in Heidelberg, Worms and Vienna. There are also indications that he introduced the young Mozart to freemasonry during the composer's time in Mannheim, although there is no firm evidence for this. It is probable that Gemmingen became a member of the Carl zur Eintracht lodge in Mannheim in 1779, some 23 years after its establishment, which came under the direction of the Grand Lodge of Prussia called Royal York for friendship. He appears already to have reached the degree of "Master" by 1782 when he relocated to Vienna where, between 1782 and 1787, he was regarded as one of the city's leading Freemasons.

=== Marriage ===
His court appointment involved working in the Schwetzingen Palace, and Gemmingen therefore took rooms in the palace "for reasons of economy" (as he wrote to his father). This meant regularly dining at the Prince-elector's table, and in the palace grounds he frequently met the Countess Palatine accompanied by her ladies in waiting. One of these was the Countess Charlotte von Sicklingen (1756–1826). Gemmingen and Charlotte married on 8 September 1779. Shortly afterwards the couple were temporarily separated when the Prince-elector acquired Bavaria and moved the court to Munich. Gemmingen moved with the court. The Prince-elector's wife, the Countess Palatine remained in Mannheim, however, together with her ladies in waiting.

In Munich Gemmingen oversaw the first Munich productions of "The Inheritance" and "The House-father", which had to be adapted for Bavarian conditions. However, in 1780 he was able to return to Mannheim for the birth of his first son.

=== Move to Vienna: enlightenment years ===
In 1781 oversight of schools was transferred from Gemmingen's remit to the Catholic Church, hampering Gemmingen's ambitions to implement Enlightenment values in Bavaria. Gemmingen resigned his position and moved to Vienna, where he hoped to be able to progress his goals under more favourable conditions. In November 1780 Emperor Joseph II had begun his sole rule and pursued Enlightenment ideals in the Habsburg monarchy, unencumbered by his mother's pragmatic conservatism. In Vienna Gemmingen received a friendly welcome: it is possible that his friend Mozart had prepared the ground for his arrival. He quickly gained access to the household of the Princess of Thun, who was exceptionally well connected in literary and musical circles. In her house he would have met members of the nobility, writers and musicians. The emperor himself, arriving incognito, was also a frequent visitor.

Friedrich Münter wrote that Gemmingen "was very influential in the background through his connections with Prince Kaunitz, Swieten and the Princess of Thun. Backed by other influential freemasons, Gemmingen tried to support Joseph II's policy of reform, using his contributions to the weekly political journals "Weltmann" and "Wahrheiten" for which, in 1783, he became editor. As editor, he continued to write many of the articles himself, using the pseudonym "O. H. Edler von Hoffenheim", a reference to the estate at Hoffenheim which his father had inherited in 1781. There were contributions from other freemasons, and some of the ideas of the "Illuminati" (of whom he evidently became one) also found a resonance in the journals. However, his publications attracted hostility in aristocratic and, more particularly, church circles. One article Gemmingen published appeared under the headline, "Dabei schaffe sich der Mensch zwischen sich und Gott Mittelwesen, wobei er über diese Gott vergisst" ("Thus mankind creates intermediaries, while forgetting about God"). Another was headed "Schutzpatrone, Heilige überhaupt und besonders Maria: Was sind dies anderes als Mittelwesen? … Noch ein allgemeiner Zug des Aberglaubens ist die übertriebene Verehrung des Priestertum." ("Protectors, saints in general and the Blessed Mary in particular: These are nothing more than intermediaries - one more piece of pressure to honour the priests excessively").

=== Freemasonry in Vienna and its divisions ===
During Gemmingen's time in Vienna, the city's energetic masonic community struggled with the appearance of the "Strict Observance" movement, which Gemmingen opposed because of the enhanced role it gave to "occult mysticism". Gemmingen supported the creation of a new lodge, respecting the older obligations and the differentiation between the difference degrees (ranks) of members, along with backing for Enlightenment values and support for the Emperor's reforms by word and deed. Gemmingen himself became Master of the new Lodge, which took its principles from an earlier group, the Lodge of true concord.

Soon afterwards he became the district lodge secretary for Vienna, with the mandate to draft up some constitutional statutes. It was under these statutes that on 22 April 1784 the Austrian Grand Lodge was set up under the leadership of Prince Dietrichstein. This was seen as a great achievement on Gemmingen's part. By the end of 1784 the "lodge of philanthropy" ("Loge Zur Wohltätigkeit") comprised around 40 members. A highlight was the recruitment of Mozart, after the composer became aware that Gemmingen was a member of the at that time secret organisation.

=== Setbacks ===
After he had been appointed editor in chief of "Wöchentlichen Wahrheiten für und über die Prediger in Wien" ("Weekly Truths for and about preachers in Vienna") in 1783 and, at about the same time, taken charge of "Der Weltmann", which was if anything less restrained in discussing church matters, Gemmingen found himself on the receiving end of attacks from Leopold Alois Hoffmann, founder of "Wöchentlichen Wahrheiten" and Gemmingen's predecessor as its editor in chief. Gemmingen's editorial appointments had been made in response to "orders from on high", which seems to refer to behind the scenes string pulling on the part of the Emperor himself. But now it was Hoffmann who complained that fees due to him had not been paid and promises had not been kept. In fact, Gemmingen had taken care to ensure that Hoffmann received a dispensation meaning that, despite his relative youth, he could become a member of the "lodge of good deeds" ("Loge Zur Wohltätigkeit"). He also employed Hoffmann as his secretary, and used his influence with his friend Swieten to see to it that Hoffmann received a post as a professor at the University of Pest. In later years Hoffmann acquired a reputation as a leading critic in the media of freemasonry. It is possible that even in 1784 his hostility to Gemmigen was conflated with a negative view of the movement. It is also possible that after publication of "Wöchentlichen Wahrheiten" ended on 10 June 1784, Gemmingen could no longer justify (or afford) retaining Hoffmann as his secretary, and Hoffmann's subsequent attacks were a form a "pay back".

Since 1783 or earlier Gemmingen had been thinking that the weekly political journals for which he was responsible, targeted on members of the upper classes, were too restricted in their appeal, and in 1784 he launched "Magazin für Wissenschaften und Literature" ("Magazine for Sciences and Literature"), intended to appeal to the growing ranks of Vienna's bourgeoisie. However, by 1785 this project was abandoned, having failed to interest its intended readership. One source speculates that it was pitched "at too high a level". In 1784 financial pressures drove Gemmingen to try and obtain a position at court, but in this he was not successful. Shortly afterwards, on 22 August 1784, he was placed under police surveillance, and his written work was subjected to censorship for the first time. He made one more attempt to launch a political journal with a more popular appeal, this time under the title "Vienna Ephemeris". This fared better than his earlier attempt, and was published till 1787, the year in which he left Vienna.

Gemmingen's departure from Vienna was sudden and largely unexplained. There are suggestions that he had made too many enemies in the city. He certainly faced financial challenges. These arose in connection with the indebtedness of his brother-in-law, Franz von Sickingen. Gemmingen's wife was certainly always very close to her brother whose approach to his finances seems to have been excessively "easy going".

=== Inheritance ===
Gemmingen's father died on 3 February 1790 and he moved with his family into the patrimonial estate at Hoffenheim, between Heidelberg and Heilbronn. Six weeks later, on 26 March 1790, he issued an "Ordinance" which reads like a cross between the constitution for a small state and a set of instructions to his tenants. The details in this prescriptive document are characterised by practical attention to detail worthy of a German product of the Enlightenment. Sources are silent over the implementation phase of the Hoffenheim Ordinance, but by the end of 1790 Gemmingen had sold the Hoffenheim estate to his younger brother, Sigmund, for 40,000 Gulden. On 11 May 1791 he purchased an estate at nearby Maudach, on the farther bank of the Rhine, for 36,000 Gulden. In an age before railroads and motorways the river was the principal transport artery for the region, and his new estate was less than an hour away from Mannheim, Heidelberg, Schwetzingen and Speyer. Gemmingen moved in with his family, spending a lot of time in Mannheim on the opposite bank. However, in 1795 the French Revolution came to his Maudach estate, the "revolutionary army" badly damaging the estate and destroying part of his book collection. With his brother-in-law Franz von Sickingen he now exchanged the Maudach property for an estate at Mühlbach near Karlstadt am Main which was in a slightly less exposed position with regard to marauding armies, and which he had inherited via his wife.

=== Back to Vienna ===
In 1799 Gemmingen was sent on a special mission to Vienna on behalf of the court. In Vienna his initial reception was cool. While enlightenment principals had lost their appeal in the light of the French Revolution and the Emperor Joseph had died in 1790, many in the political establishment still remembered Gemmingen from his time in Vienna during the 1780s. Gemmingen's diplomatic skills soon won him recognition at the court. The Margrave of Baden was more than pleased with his performance and appointed him a permanent plenipotentiary to the Court at Vienna, for which he received annual remuneration of 22,000 Gulden.

With Napoleon's decisive victory at Austerlitz, Baden benefitted substantially from the French empoeror's favour, its territory substantially enlarged as it became the Grand Duchy of Baden, a development in which Gemmingen played his part.

=== Final years ===
After 1806 Gemingen returned to Mühlbach with his family, spending the last three decades of his life away from public life and increasingly impoverished. His high level of indebtedness may have resulted from excessive cash transfers and guarantees on behalf of his impecunious brother in law. He then attempted to increase his income by increasing the charges on the tenant farmers on the estates. This met with particularly strong resistance at Hoffenheim where at one stage troops had to be called in and set on the tenants. His own financial difficulties led him to forget earlier backing for unjustly treated peasants. In 1817, the estate at Mühlbach had to be given up and he moved back, briefly, to Hoffenheim, and then to Heidelberg where, in 1819, he was obliged to file for bankruptcy. When the data were computed he was found to have debts in excess of 200,000 Gulden and the Mannheim High Court was obliged to intervene. His wife died in 1826, and he died ten years later, completely impoverished. He retained only a small collection of books. During his final years this once esteemed enlightenment writer and diplomat fell into a level of obscurity from which his reputation has not yet recovered.

== Output (selection) ==
- Ein erster Versuch sei Sidney und Silly gewesen, allerdings ist seine Urheberschaft nicht gesichert.
- 1778 Übersetzung des Pygmalion von J.J. Rousseau
- 1778 Übersetzung Richard III. von Shakespeare
- 1778 Gemeinsam mit Mozart das Duodrama Semiramis, heute verschollen
- 1778/79 Mannheimer Dramaturgie, Theaterjournal (Sturm und Drang) mit Theaterkritik und theatertheoretischen Beiträgen
- 1779 Die Erbschaft, Schauspiel
- 1779 Der deutsche Hausvater, Schauspiel (digitalised)
- 1780 gesammeltes Werk der Mannheimer Dramaturgie
- 1781 Übersetzung Allegro und Penseroso von J. Milton
- 1782 bringt Gemmingen die Wochenzeitschrift Der Weltmann heraus
- 1782 Richard II, ein Trauerspiel für die Deutsche Schaubühne
- 1782 Weltmann, Wochenzeitschrift, Wien, Herausgeber
- 1782 Die wöchentlichen Wahrheiten, Wochenzeitschrift, Wien ab 1783 Schriftleiter
- 1784 Magazin für Wissenschaft und Kultur, Wien
- 1785 Wiener Ephemeriden
