= Imperial County (disambiguation) =

Imperial County is a place in California.

Imperial County may also refer to:

- Imperial county, a fief held by an imperial count of the Holy Roman Empire
  - Imperial County of Bretzenheim, a minor principality in pre-Napoleonic Germany
  - Imperial County of Ortenburg, a state of the Holy Roman Empire
  - Imperial County of Rantzau, a state of the Holy Roman Empire
  - Imperial County of Reuss, several historical states in present-day Thuringia, Germany
