= Wilhelm Kandler =

German Bohemian painter

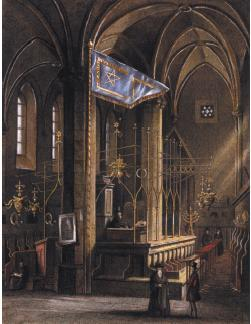
Interior of the Altneu Synagogue in Prague (1838)

Wilhelm Kandler (Czech: Vilém Kandler; 28 February 1816 in Chrastava – 18 May 1896 in Prague) was a German Bohemian painter, illustrator, engraver and amateur essayist.

== Biography ==
Kandler was the son of a gilder and painter who later fell ill during a period of employment in Poland and, afterward, could barely find enough work to support his large family. Following several moves, his father found work as a drawing teacher in Žatec. By that time, his parents realized that they could not provide him with a decent education in the arts, so they asked an old friend, the painter Joseph von Führich, to help get him enrolled at the Academy of Fine Arts, Prague. This was achieved, and the family moved there in 1830. Four years later, his father's health had deteriorated to the point that he could barely work, so Wilhelm had to leave the academy and find work as a fabric designer to provide support.

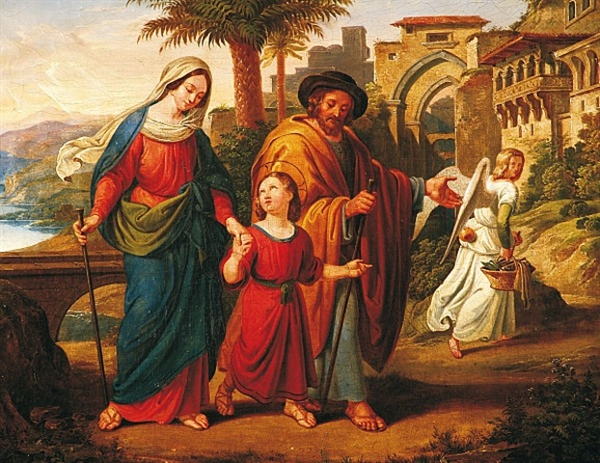
Pilgrims (c.1845–50)

Shortly after, a local priest who had heard of his talent hired him to paint images at the church in Kozly, which resulted in further commissions, generally done in conjunction with older artists, including panoramic views of Prague and commemorative drawings for the coronation of Ferdinand as King of Bohemia in 1836. This allowed him to continue his studies and, after his father's death in 1837, be sole support for his family. His career painting frescoes began when Eduard Gurk, the Habsburg's court painter, arranged for him and Antonín Lhota to paint the staircase of the grand tower at Karlštejn Castle. He was then selected for further training in fresco work by Johann Baptist Müller (1809–1869) and Josef Holzmaier.

In the 1840s, he made a lengthy trip to Italy, courtesy of a stipend from private sources. While in Rome, Ambassador Rudolph von Lützow allowed him to stay at the embassy. He also met with, and came under the influence of, Friedrich Overbeck and other members of the Nazarene movement. He remained in Italy, studying and working, until 1850, despite events related to the Revolutions of 1848 and his possible involvement as a citizen of the Austrian Empire.

Upon his return to Austria, he gave a small exhibition at Hofburg Palace of the works he had created in Italy. He remained in Vienna for several months, then went to Prague and held another exhibition at Wallenstein Palace, as part of a benefit for the military hospital in Karlovy Vary.

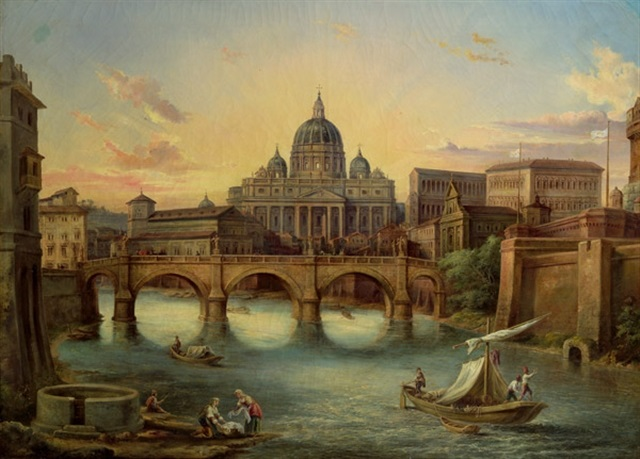
View of Rome with St. Peter's Basilica (1872, based on a painting from 1850)

Although his works were critically acclaimed, new orders were slow in coming, so he planned to go back to Rome. This changed after King Ferdinand saw some of his paintings and hired him to help restore the chapel at Reichstadt Castle in Zákupy. This encouraged further commissions for frescoes and paintings (mostly of a religious nature) so Kandler was able to remain in Prague until his death.

In addition to his paintings, he wrote a series of articles for the quarterly journal Libussa (published from 1842 to 1860), mostly dealing with his experiences in Italy and aspects of Italian culture. The journal's last few issues featured a series of his letters from Rome. He also illustrated several books; notably Das Böhmerland, a series of travel sketches by Siegfried Kapper.
