= Lindau Abbey =

Coordinates: 47°32′48″N 9°41′15″E

Imperial Abbey of Lindau Reichsstift Lindau
- 1466–1802
- Status: Imperial Abbey
- Capital: Lindau Abbey
- Government: Elective principality
- Historical era: Middle Ages
  - Founded: ca 822
  - Gained immediacy: 1466
  - Lindau accepted the Protestant Reformation: 1528
  - Secularised to Principality of Bretzenheim: 1802
  - Exchanged for territory in Bohemia and Hungary with Austria: 1804 1802
  - To Bavaria: 1805
Preceded by	Succeeded by
Lindau	County of Bretzenheim
- Today part of: Germany

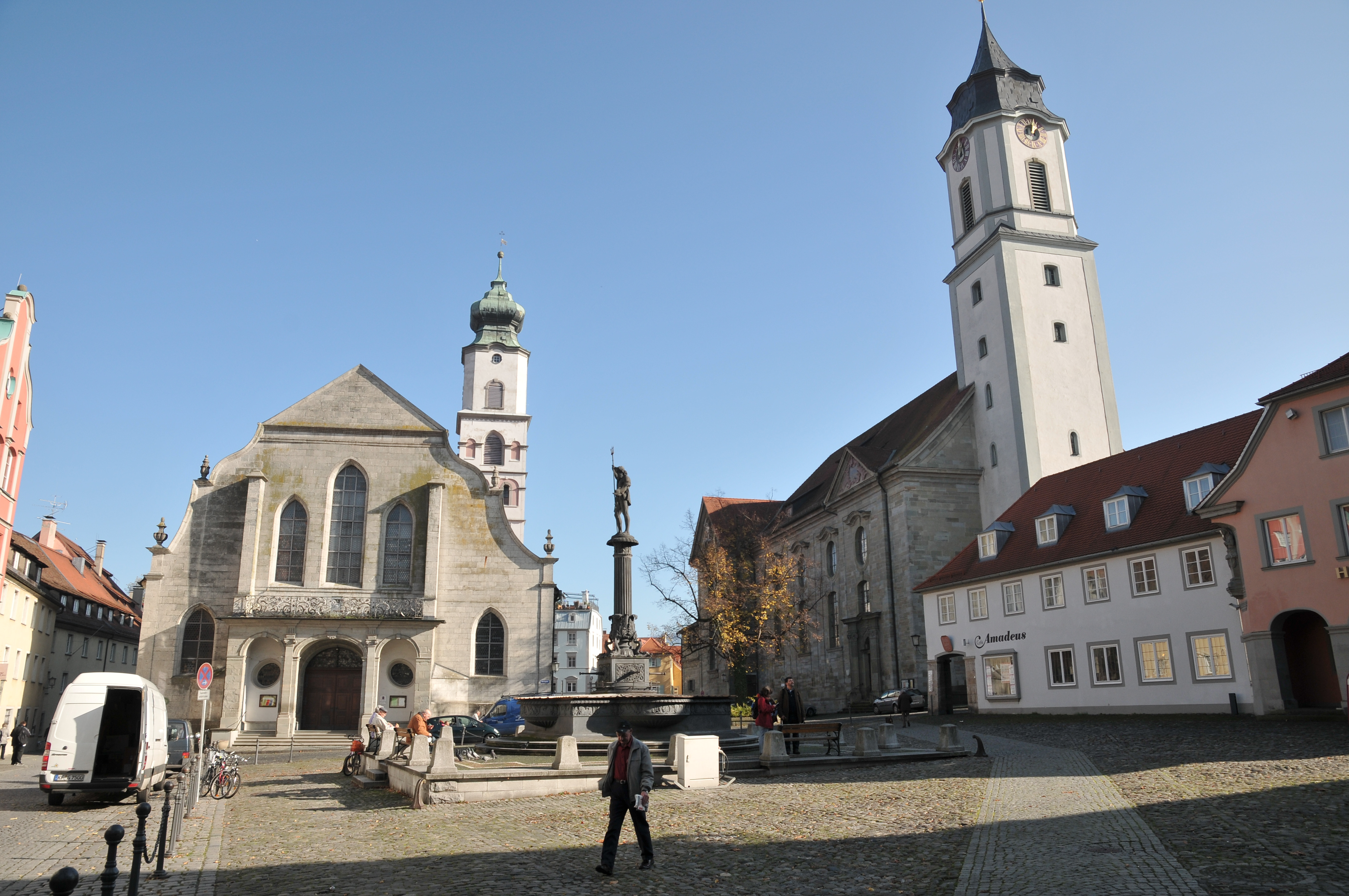
Lindau Abbey

Lindau Abbey (German: Reichsstift Lindau) was a house of secular canonesses in Lindau on the Bodensee in Bavaria, Germany, which stands on an island in the lake.

== History ==
The community, dedicated to the Blessed Virgin Mary, is traditionally held to have been founded by Count Adelbert of Raetia in about 822. The town of Lindau grew round the foundation.

The abbey was granted Imperial immediacy (German: Reichsfreiheit) in 1466.

During the Protestant Reformation on the mainland were the only places in this region to remain Catholic.

The community was dissolved in 1802 in the course of the secularisation of German Imperial Abbeys, and its assets taken over by the Prince of Bretzenheim (son of Elector of Bavaria Charles Theodore), who in 1804 exchanged Lindau for estates in Bohemia and Hungary. In 1806 the territory became part of the new Kingdom of Bavaria.

The residential and service buildings were used for local government offices.

The canonesses' church became the present Roman Catholic minster-church of the Blessed Virgin Mary on the market place in the Old Town of Lindau. The church building originated at the same time as the religious community, that is, in the early 9th century. After the fire of 1728 that destroyed most of the town the church was rebuilt in Baroque style by the master builder Giovanni Gaspare Bagnato, who also built Schloss Mainau and the "New Castle" at Meersburg. The interior has Baroque ceiling paintings and Rococo decorations.

== Other religious houses in Lindau ==
Lindau has also contained other religious houses.

=== Franciscans ===
There was a friary here of the Friars Minor or Minorites (founded 1224, dissolved 1528) and also a monastery of nuns of the Third Order of St. Francis (founded before 1238), which survived the Protestant Reformation by becoming Protestant and was secularised at the same time as Lindau Abbey. The church of the Minorites is still in existence as the Lindauer Stadttheater ("Lindau Town Theatre") but the cloister of the tertiary nuns were demolished in 1861. These premises were sometimes known as the Kloster am Steg ("monastery on the jetty").

=== Beguinage ===
There was also a house of the Beguines, founded in 1268. On 15 May 1525 it was dissolved and sold off. The buildings were bought in 1857 by the Sisters of Loreto, known locally as the "English Ladies" (Englische Fräulein), who founded here a "Private Higher School for Girls" (Private Höhere Töchterschule). Of its successor establishments, the Insel-Institut was closed in 1991, but the Maria-Ward-Realschule continues as a Realschule for girls within the educational programme of the Diocese of Augsburg.
