= Chrastava =

Town in the Czech Republic

- Town
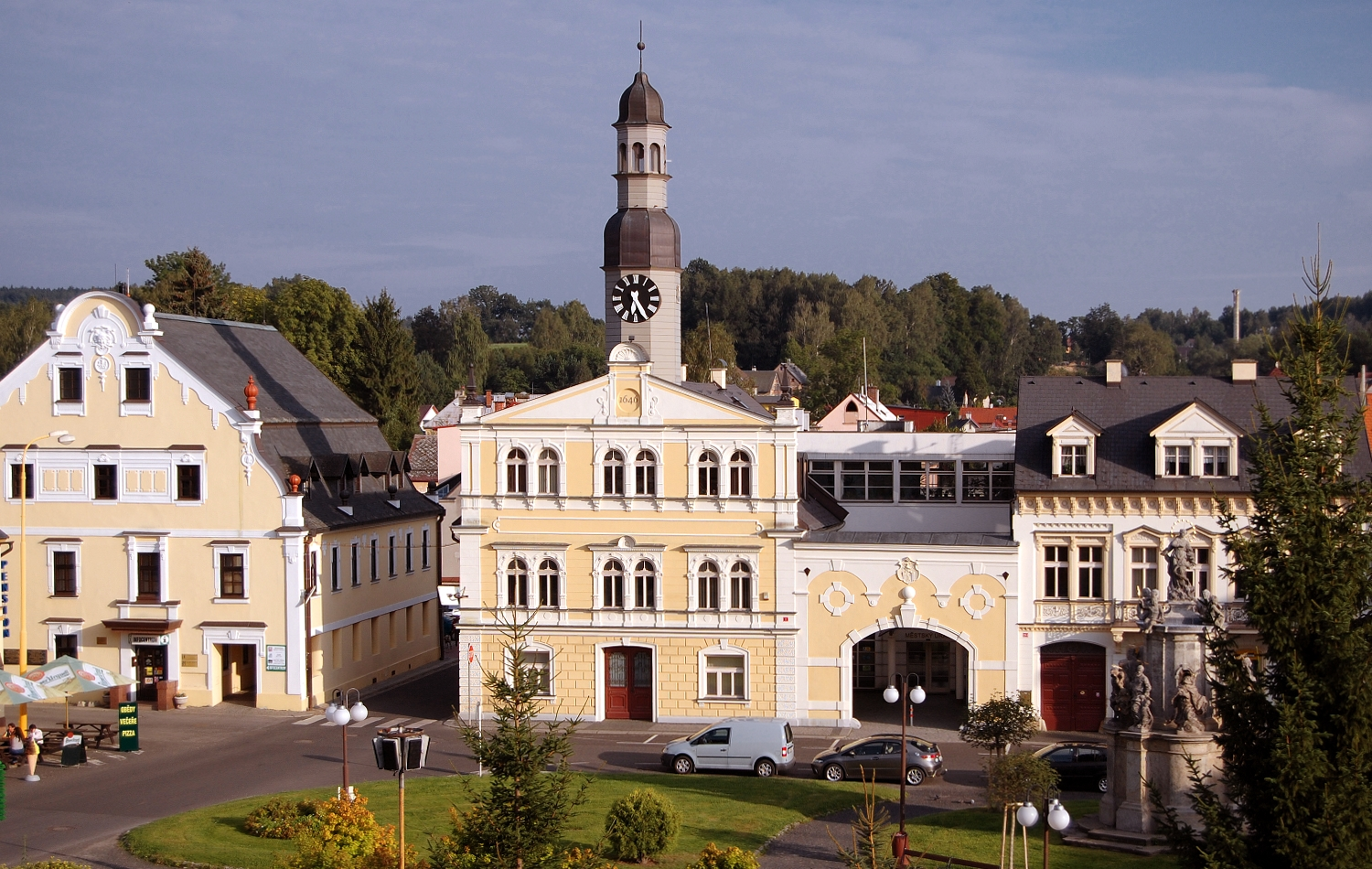
- Town hall on the square Náměstí 1. máje

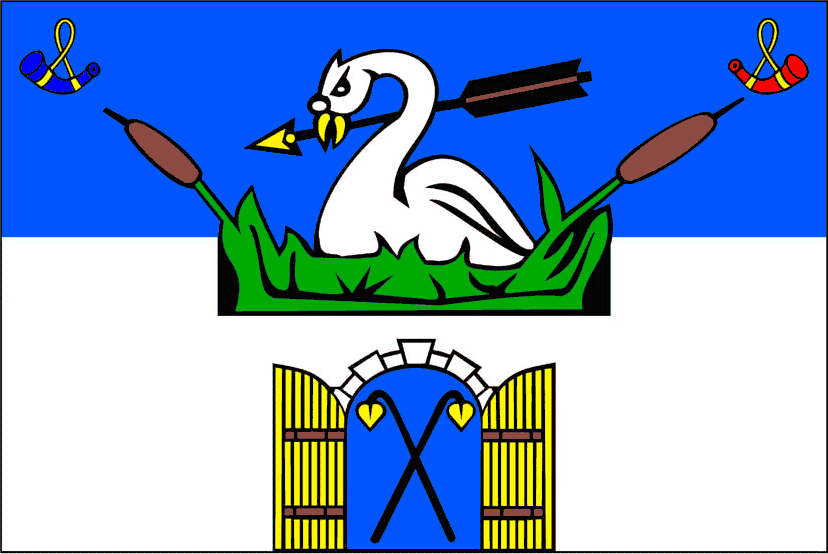
- Flag Coat of arms

- Location in the Czech Republic
- Coordinates: 50°49′1″N 14°58′8″E
- Country: Czech Republic
- Region: Liberec
- District: Liberec
- First mentioned: 1352

Government
  - Mayor: Michael Canov (SLK)

Area
  - Total: 27.46 km^{2} (10.60 sq mi)
- Elevation: 295 m (968 ft)

Population (2026-01-01)
  - Total: 6,349
  - Density: 231.2/km^{2} (598.8/sq mi)
- Time zone: UTC+1 (CET)
  - Summer (DST): UTC+2 (CEST)
- Postal code: 463 31
- Website: www.chrastava.eu

Chrastava (Czech pronunciation: [ˈxrastava]; German: Kratzau) is a town in Liberec District in the Liberec Region of the Czech Republic. It has about 6,300 inhabitants. Chrastava town is located at the confluence of the Lusatian Neisse and Jeřice rivers and is known as an industrial town.

== Administrative division ==
Chrastava consists of eight municipal parts (in brackets population according to the 2021 census):

- Chrastava (3,675)
- Dolní Chrastava (1,042)
- Horní Chrastava (524)
- Andělská Hora (353)
- Dolní Vítkov (278)
- Horní Vítkov (123)
- Víska (52)
- Vysoká (44)

== Etymology ==
The name is derived from the old words chrást (in Czech) and khróst (in Upper Sorbian), meaning 'brushwood' or 'shrubs'.

== Geography ==
Chrastava is located about 8 km (5 mi) northwest of Liberec. On the north, the municipal territory borders Germany. It lies mostly in the Zittau Basin, but it also extends into the Jizera Mountains on the north and into the Ještěd–Kozákov Ridge on the south. The highest point is the hill Dlouhá hora at 748 m (2,454 ft) above sea level. The town is situated at the confluence of the Lusatian Neisse and Jeřice rivers.

== History ==
Chrastava in the second half of the 18th century

Chrastava in c. 1900

The first written mention of Chrastava is from 1352 as Cratzauia, already referred to as quite big settlement. It was founded probably at the end of the 13th century by German settlers, having been invited by King Ottokar II. They came mainly from the town of Pirna in Saxony and began to mine metals in the vicinity of Chrastava, in particularly copper, tin, lead, iron and silver.

Chrastava, then known mostly by the German name Kratzau, was occupied by the Hussites who use the town as a base for expeditions into Lusatia during the Hussite Wars. In 1433, the local castle and the whole town was conquered and damaged. This caused general decline, departure of population and stagnation of trade, which lasted for several decades.

In the 16th and 17th centuries, ore mining in Chrastava declined, when most of the reserves had already been mined. The population therefore gradually reoriented to the textile industry. The first large textile factory was built in 1815. In 1859, the railway was built.

Chrastava became part of Czechoslovakia after the collapse of Austria-Hungary from World War I. The town was almost entirely ethnic German, however, and was ceded to Nazi Germany and administered as part of the Reichsgau Sudetenland after the Munich Agreement in 1938.

In 1943, during World War II, two forced labor camps were set up in the area by Organization Schmelt. These camps provided workers for the Tannwald Textile Works and an ammunition factory (Deutsche Industriewerke AG) that produced hand grenades and other military material for the armed forces of Germany. The camps became subcamps of Gross-Rosen in October 1944. Female prisoners were transported to Kratzau from Auschwitz, as well as from other Gross-Rosen subcamps that were being evacuated. By then the subcamps included Polish, Czech, French, Belgian, Dutch and Danish women.

As more women arrived from the evacuated Gross-Rosen subcamps, conditions at Kratzau worsened. Josef Mengele is known to have visited Kratzau three times between October 1944 and March 1945 to conduct a "selection"; after each of these visits the selected women were sent to a subcamp in Zittau.

After the German population was expelled in 1945–1947, Chrastava was resettled mainly by Czechs.

== Demographics ==
Historical population

| Year | Pop. | ±% |
|---|---|---|
| 1869 | 6,680 | — |
| 1880 | 6,814 | +2.0% |
| 1890 | 6,781 | −0.5% |
| 1900 | 6,983 | +3.0% |
| 1910 | 7,671 | +9.9% |

| Year | Pop. | ±% |
|---|---|---|
| 1921 | 6,996 | −8.8% |
| 1930 | 7,264 | +3.8% |
| 1950 | 4,654 | −35.9% |
| 1961 | 4,807 | +3.3% |
| 1970 | 4,900 | +1.9% |

| Year | Pop. | ±% |
|---|---|---|
| 1980 | 5,200 | +6.1% |
| 1991 | 5,597 | +7.6% |
| 2001 | 5,944 | +6.2% |
| 2011 | 6,013 | +1.2% |
| 2021 | 6,091 | +1.3% |

Source: Censuses

== Economy ==
The largest employed with its headquarters in the town is a branch of the Benteler International company, focused on the production of automotive parts. The factory was built in 1999 and employs about 600 people.

== Transport ==
The I/35 expressway (part of the European route E442) from Liberec to the Czech–German border runs through the town.

Chrastava is located on the railway line Liberec–Zittau–Varnsdorf.

== Sights ==
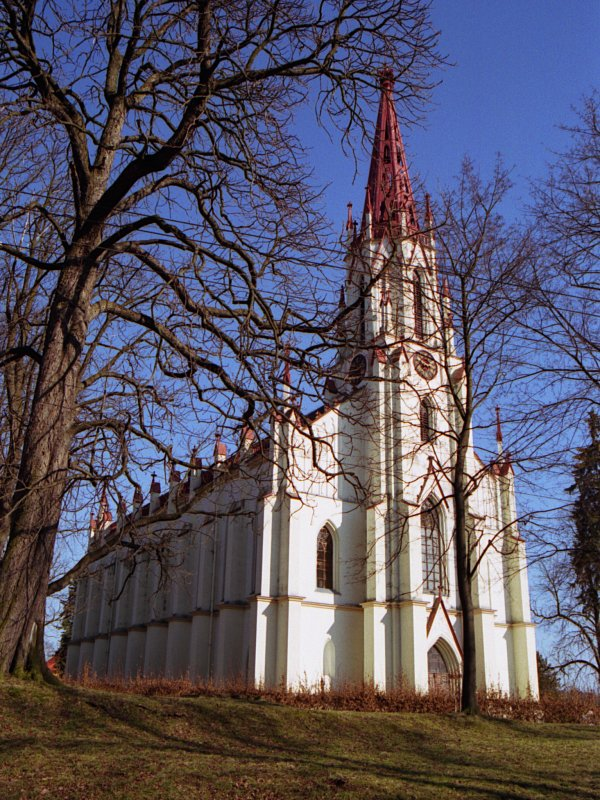
Church of Saint Lawrence

The main landmark of Chrastava is the Church of Saint Lawrence. It was originally a wooden church from the 14th century. A massive stone tower was added at the end of the 16th century. The church was rebuilt into its current pseudo-Gothic form in 1866–1868. The Baroque rectory next to the church dates from 1739.

The town hall was built in the second half of the 17th century, after the old town hall was destroyed by fires in 1621 and 1642. Its current appearance with Neoclassical elements dates from 1899.

The Church of the Visitation of the Virgin Mary is located in Horní Vítkov. It was built in the Baroque style in 1671.

The Church of Our Lady of the Snows is located in Andělská Hora. Its present Empire form dates from 1833.

== Notable people ==
- Leopold Alois Hoffmann (1760–1806), Austrian writer
- Joseph von Führich (1800–1876), Austrian painter
- Wilhelm Kandler (1816–1896), German Bohemian painter
- Theodor Körner (1873–1957), Austrian politician, President of Austria in 1951–1957; grew up here
- Willi Sitte (1921–2013), German painter

== Twin towns – sister cities ==
Chrastava is twinned with:

- Eichstätt, Germany
- Lwówek Śląski, Poland
