= Franz Gotthardi =

Austrian-Hungarian secret police officer

Franz Gotthardi (Hungarian: Gotthardi Ferenc; 1750 – 1795) was a Hungarian-born businessman who became a senior police officer and subsequently emerged as the head of the secret police for the Habsburg monarchy. He fell from favour and died in prison after Francis II came to power.

== Life ==
=== Beginnings and service to Joseph II ===
Franz Gotthardi was probably born in Pest. It was in Pest that he built his career as a businessman and opened a coffeehouse. One source identifies him as a "formerly bankrupt coffee trader". During the times of Joseph II Gotthardi emerged as a police officer, becoming a government advisor and, in 1787, head of the police service in Pest, creating a network of agents and informants.

=== Service to Leopold II ===
In 1790 Joseph II died and, according to at least one source, the "Josephine system" of surveillance collapsed. The emperor died childless and was therefore succeeded by his younger brother, Leopold II. The French Revolution, which had been unfolding since 1789, made the government intensely nervous. The well-publicised and intensifying difficulties of the emperor's youngest sister between 1789 and her execution by guillotine in 1793 made it personal. Meanwhile, Franz Gotthardi found himself having to relocate from Pest to Vienna, where he was installed by the new emperor as a director of the Court Theatre ("Burgtheater") at an annual salary of 2,100 florins. The theater directorship was a cover which may or may not have convinced observers. He became an imperial advisor. By the first part of 1791 Franz Gotthardi was installed as head of the Imperial Secret Police. Government policy was driven by a fear of secret organisations that might be conspiring to emulate the Storming of the Bastille and its ever more alarming aftermath in Vienna. For Gotthardi there was a focus on recruiting agents and informants, an activity in which he was presumably already well versed on account of his work during the 1780s in Pest. Principal targets included Freemasons, Jesuits and others identified as "Illuminati". Given the shadowy nature of the world in which Gotthardi operated, it is unsurprising that many details of his work remain undisclosed. One high-profile recruit known to posterity is the politician, and a leader of the so-called Hungarian Jacobin movement, Ignác Martinovics, who was reportedly an exceptionally productive intelligence agent. Another, known to posterity as much for his legacy as a dramatist as for his espionage work up to 1792, was Leopold Alois Hoffmann, Gotthardi's friend. The two men had originally met in Pest, where Hoffmann held an academic post between 1785 and 1790, and had together returned to Vienna in 1790 as the political weather further down the Danube became dangerously heated for members of the German-speaking minority with a significant public profile. By the time of his death in 1795 Franz Gotthardi had become something of a hate figure in certain quarters. He had quickly built up a network of agents whose professional duties included both reporting on "public opinion" and manipulating it. There are hostile references to his having diligently encouraged espionage and imposed a brutal police system, while clamping down on press freedom.

=== Reign of Francis II and fall from grace ===
Leopold II died unexpectedly on 1 March 1790, having served as emperor for slightly more than two years. The imperial crown passed on to a new generation. It is clear that Gotthardi never enjoyed the close working relationship with the young Emperor Francis that he had established with the emperor's late father. At some point between 1792 and 1795 the emperor dispensed with the services of his father's spy chief. During 1794/95 Gotthardi was caught up in a court process triggered by the recently uncovered Jacobin conspiracy (Note: There are indications that after 1789 the ruling class in Vienna applied the "Jacobin" epithet to any conspiratorial revolutionary movement, real or imagined (and some were undoubtedly real enough) that threatened the stability of the regime. It seems that during the early 1790s most of those identified as "Jacobin conspirators" were of Hungarian provenance, rather than Austrian.) His former top agent, Ignác Martinovics, was charged and convicted for setting up two republican secret clubs: one for aristocratic members, and one for members with a bourgeois background. Martinovics was found to have stirred up a revolt among the Hungarian serfs, and to have set up four regionally based directorates. Gotthardi, as the intelligence boss of Martinovics, fell under suspicion. On the night of 23/24 July 1795 both men were among those arrested in Vienna. Martinovics reportedly believed that the authorities must already know more than they did, and promptly made a full confusion in the hope of improving his situation.

=== Role in the Jacobin conspiracy and imprisonment ===
Gotthardi was clearly aware of the activities of the "Jacobin" conspirators organised by Martinovics, and though there is no indication that he ever conspired with them, it also appears that he never betrayed them to the regular security services. Of the 42 republican club members arrested and convicted, six were executed on 20 May 1795. Martinovics was one of them. Franz Gotthardi was not among those executed: instead he received a 35-year prison sentence.

== Death ==
According to at least one source, it was due to the conditions of his imprisonment that Franz Gotthardi died, probably during the final part of July 1795, less than six months after his sentencing.
