= Baden gulden =

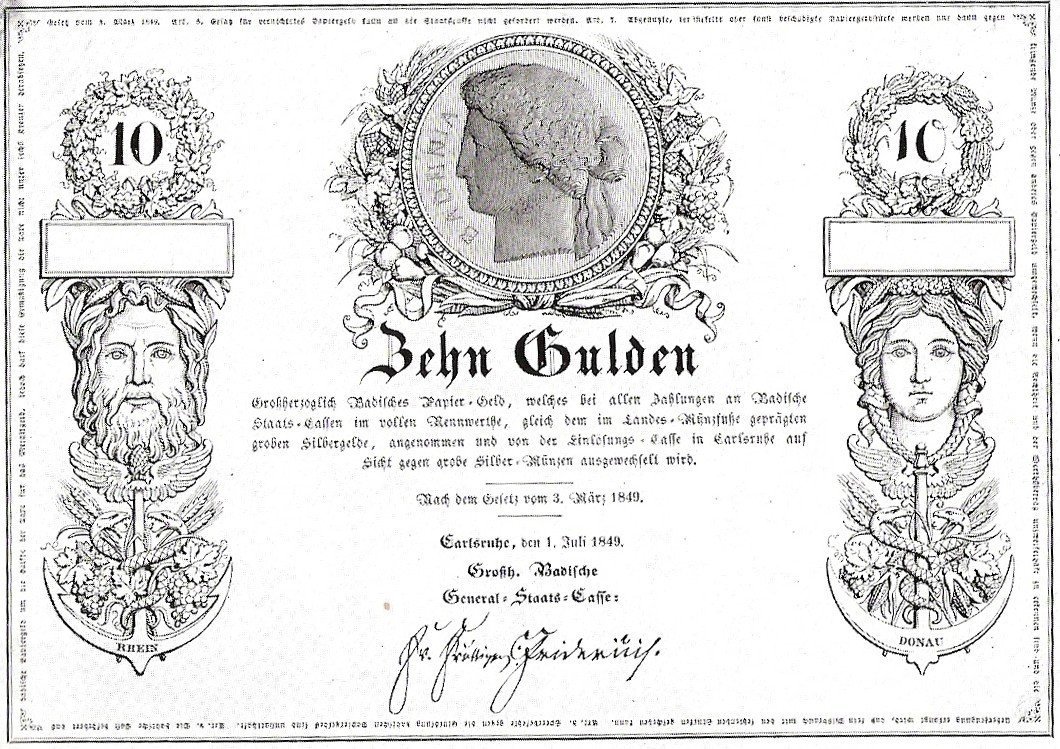
1849 note of the Bank of Baden, worth 10 gulden

Baden used the South German gulden as its currency from 1754 until 1873. Until 1821, the Gulden was a unit of account, worth 5/12 of a Conventionsthaler, used to denominate banknotes but not issued as a coin. It was subdivided into 50 Conventionskreuzer or 60 Kreuzer landmünze.

In 1821, the first Gulden coins were issued, equal to the previous Gulden and subdivided into 60 Kreuzer. Between 1829 and 1837, the Thaler was the currency of Baden, worth 100 Kreuzer.

In 1837, Baden joined the South German Monetary Union and readopted the Gulden as its currency, again worth 60 Kreuzer. The new Gulden was equal to the earlier Gulden and was worth four sevenths of a Prussian Thaler.

In 1857, the Vereinsthaler was introduced to Baden but the Gulden, worth four sevenths of a Vereinsthaler, continued to be the chief unit of currency until 1873, when the German Mark was introduced at a rate of 1 Mark = 35 Kreuzer. The introduction of the German mark in 1873 was the culmination of decades-long efforts to unify the various currencies used by the German Confederation.
