= Ambrosius Franz, Count of Virmont =

German nobleman (1682–1744)

Ambrosius Franz Friedrich Christian Adalbert von Virmont (also von Viermund; 15 December 1682 – 19 November 1744) was a German nobleman and Imperial Count of Virmont and Bretzenheim.

== Life ==
Ambrosius Franz was the only son of Ambrosius Adrian, Freiherr von Viermund zu Neersen (1640–1688), and Johanna Margaretha von Spee (died 1712). He baptised in December 1682. His family seat was Schloss Neersen in today's Willich in the Lower Rhine region. He was still a minor when his father died in 1688, and he inherited his father's titles and fiefs as Freiherr von Viermund and Lord of Neersen. He reached adulthood in 1699.

In 1705, he married Eleonore Magdalena Wilhelmina (1687–1727), daughter of Ernest William, Count of Bentheim-Tecklenburg-Steinfurt. This marriage gave him access to the higher ranks of the European nobility. In respect of the merits of his uncle General Damian Hugo von Virmont during the Great Turkish War, Emperor Joseph I on 8 September 1706 raised both him and his uncle to Imperial Counts. Following the fashion of the time his family name was altered from von Viermund to the frenchified von Virmont. His wife Eleonore died in 1727. Soon after his two children Maria Isabella Augusta Ernestine (1706–1728) and Joseph Damian Max (1707–1730) also died.

In 1731, he was appointed to be judge at the Imperial Chamber Court (Reichskammergericht) in Wetzlar and became one of the highest judges of the Holy Roman Empire. After Count Alexander IV. von Velen had died in 1733 the Archbishop and Prince-elector of Cologne Clemens August of Bavaria enfeoffed him with the Lordship of Bretzenheim. This Lordship was an Imperial Estate providing him a seat and vote both in the Upper Rhenish Circle and in the Bench of Counts of Westphalia. On 22 August 1738 he was even elected to be the catholic director of the Lower Rhenish-Westphalian Comital College. He furtheron styled himself as "Reichsgraf von und zu Virmont und Bretzenheim".

In 1741, he married his second wife Maria Elisabeth von Nesselrode, daughter of the Royal-Hungarian Field Marshal Johann Hermann Franz von Nesselrode (died 1751) and his cousin Maria Ludovica von Virmont. Maria Elisabeth had been handmaiden of dowager empress Wilhelmine Amalia and was considerably younger than Ambrosius Franz. During all his life Ambrosius Franz sought to regain the estates and possessions of his family in and around the town of Viermünden in Hesse. 1742 he applied to be enfeoffed with the Lordship of Viermünden at the court of landgrave Frederick I and after being repeatedly refused filed a lawsuit at the Aulic Council in Vienna in this matter. His death in 1744 forestalled a final decision.

On 19 November 1744, after a masked ball in Wetzlar Ambrosius Franz abruptly died. Since the children from his first marriage had all died early and the second marriage had remained childless, the House of Viermund became extinct with his death. On 21 November 1744, he was buried in Wetzlar Cathedral. After a long legal dispute, his widow finally in 1763 returned the Lordship of Neersen, including Schloss Neersen, to the Electorate of Cologne for a payment of 110,000 florins. The Lordhship of Bretzenheim was given by the Archbishop of Cologne to Ignaz Felix Freiherr von Roll zu Bernau.

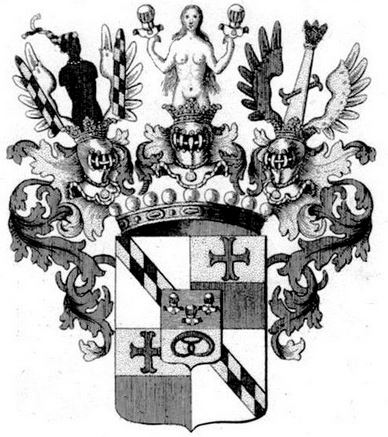
Coat of Arms of Ambrosius Franz, Count of Virmont

== Titles ==
By 1744, he held the following titles:

- Reichsgraf von und zu Virmont und Bretzenheim,
- Baron (Freiherr) of Neersen, Anrath, Donk, Zoppenbroich, Nordenbeck and Gündringen,
- Lord (Herr) of the free County of Schönau, of Hülsdonk, Bladenhorst, Dürrenhardt, Altenhof, Clörath, Kollenburg and Broichhausen,
- Heredary Bailiff (Erbvogt) of Uerdingen
- Imperial Privy Councillor (Geheimrat) and Judge of the Chamber Court,
- Director of the Lower Rhenish-Westphalian Comital College,
- Knight Grand Cross and Commander of the Order of Saint Michael.

== Notes ==
New creation	Count of Virmont; 1706–1744	Extinct
Preceded by Ambrosius Adrian von Viermund	Lord of Neersen; 1688–1744	Succeeded by Electorate of Cologne
Preceded by Alexander IV. von Velen	Lord of Bretzenheim; 1734–1744	Succeeded by Ignaz Felix von Roll zu Bernau
