= Josepha von Heydeck =

German royal mistress of Charles Theodore, Elector of Bavaria

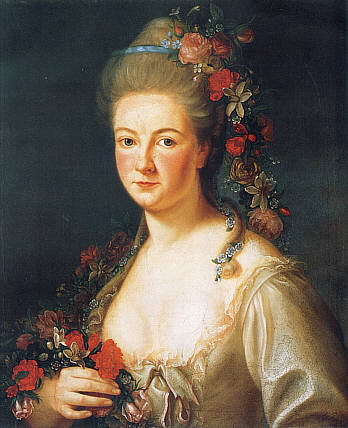
- Josepha Seyffert by Johann Peter Hoffmeister
- Born: Josepha Seyffert; 1748
- Died: 1771 (aged 22–23)

Josepha von Heydeck (1748–1771), was the royal mistress of Charles Theodore, Elector Palatine, from 1765 until 1771.

== Biography ==
Josepha Seyffert was the child of a palatinate governmental secretary Seyffert and Maria Franziska Reichard. In 1765, after the death of Françoise of Parckstein, the previous mistress of the elector, she attracted the attention of elector Charles Theodore at the opera in Mannheim and was made his mistress.

Josepha von Heydeck was described as pretty, sensible, merciful and kind. Upon the wish of the elector, she was discreet in her public appearances as Charles Theodore, though separated from his spouse electress Elizabeth Auguste, found it important that his spouse's position as electress should not be undermined. On 19 March 1767, she was given the fief of Heydeck, and at the birth of her daughter in 1768, Charles Theodore legitimized the child, and gave both mother and child the title Countess of Heydeck. On 24 October 1769, their son Karl August, later Sovereign Prince of Bretzenheim (1790-1795) and of Lindau (1802-1804, de facto 1805), was born.

She was given her own house in Mannheim. She died in childbirth in 1771.

== Figures ==
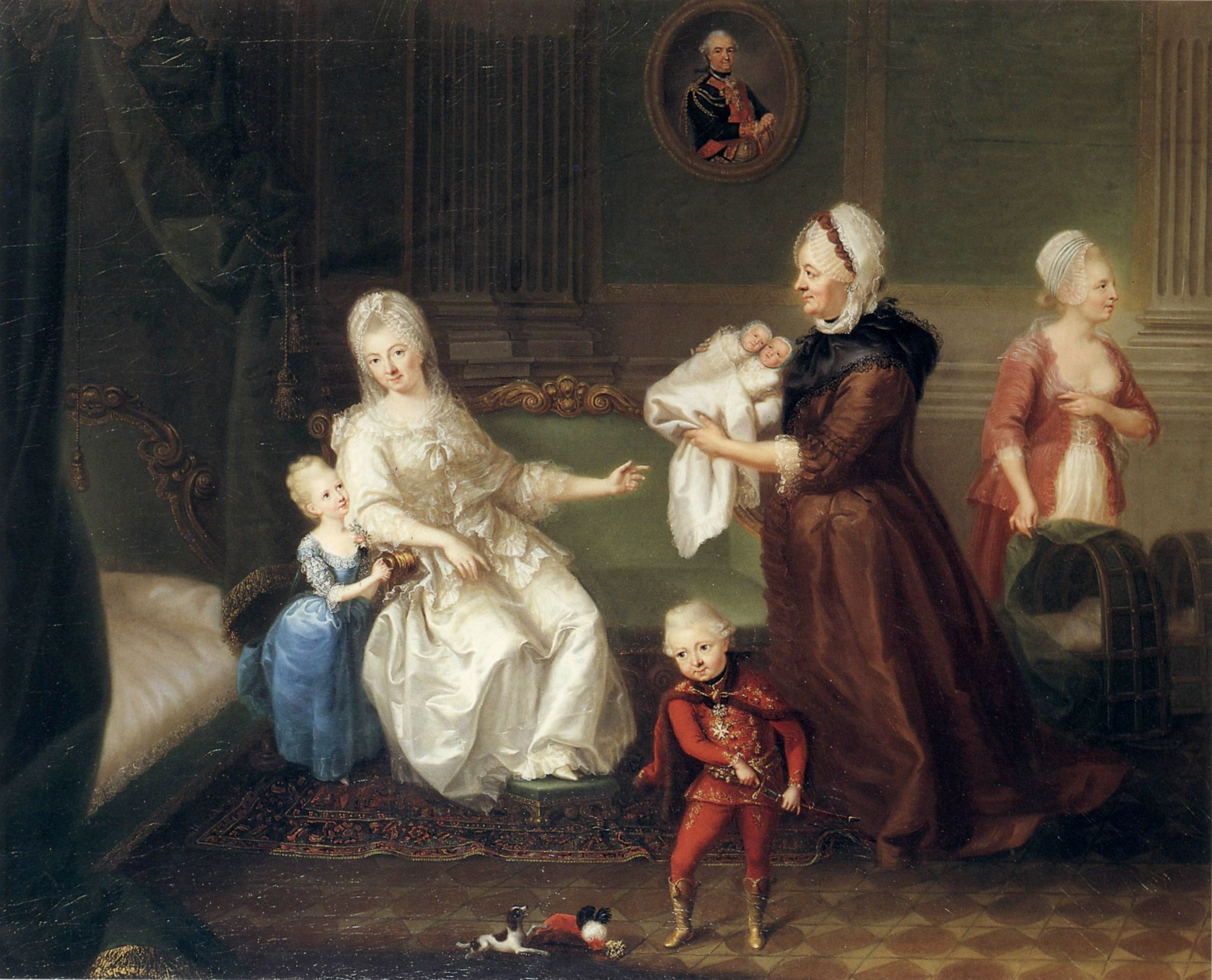
The Countess with her children. (The painting is historically inaccurate since the mother of the twins (born 1771) died shortly after their birth from puerperal fever.)

Several paintings by Josepha Seyffert, Countess von Heydeck, have been preserved. Two portraits are in the Kurpfälzisches Museum of the city of Heidelberg. In the portrait by the painter Johann Peter Hoffmeister (* 1740 in Heidelberg; † 1772 in Mannheim) from 1770, she can be seen as a 22-year-old woman in the role of the Roman goddess Flora. A flower garland of roses, carnations and forget-me-nots hangs from the attached hair as a symbol of the deity. In a painting by the painter Johann Wilhelm Hoffnas, Josepha von Heydeck sits at a harpsichord and holds sheet music in her hand. This suggests that she also had a musical education. On a history painting by the painter Heinrich Carl Brandt (1724–1787) from 1785, which is located in the Reiss Museum of the city of Mannheim, she is shown shortly before her death with her four children and two servants.
