= Leopold Alois Hoffmann =

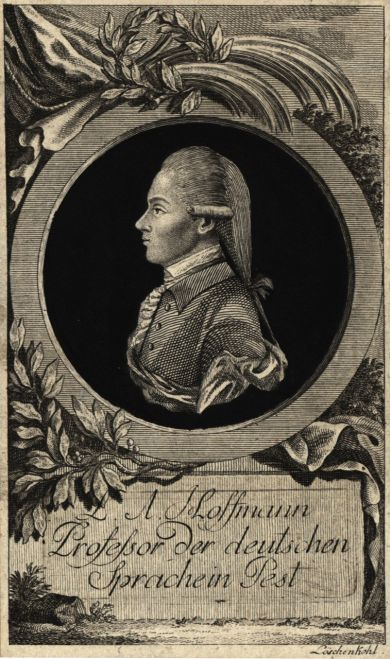
- Born: Franz Leopold Hoffmann; 29 January 1760; Dolní Vítkov, Bohemia, Habsburg monarchy
- Died: 2 September 1806 (aged 46); Wiener Neustadt, Austrian Empire
- Occupations: Journalist and pamphleteer Dramatist; University professor (Pest & Vienna); Police spy
- Spouse(s): 1. Maria Pfrigner; 2. Thekla _____
- Parent(s): Johann Friedrich (1720–1767); Maria Apollonia Arnolt (1718–?)

Leopold Alois Hoffmann (29 January 1760 – 2 September 1806) was an Austrian writer and dramatist. He was based for most of his career in Vienna.

As the "secret state" elements of the Habsburg empire evolved, especially in Vienna itself, during the government backlash against the reforms of Emperor Joseph II, a number of contemporary sources identify Hoffmann as a government spy.

== Life ==
Hoffmann was born in Niederwittig in northern Bohemia (today Dolní Vítkov, part of Chrastava in the Czech Republic). (Note: One nineteenth source indicates that he was probably born in Vienna, and this has found its way through to one or two derivative sources, but most sources prefer Niederwittig as his birth place.) His father, Johann Friedrich Hoffmann (1720–1767), was a successful shoe maker and tailor. He attended the prestigious Matthias-Gymnasium in Breslau (today Wrocław in Poland), a Jesuit establishment in neighbouring Prussia, studied briefly in Vienna and then, in 1777, settled in Prague where he launched himself as a writer – described by one influential source as a "spiritually careless writer" ("..aber gesinnungsmäßig leichtfertiger Schriftstelle"). His first substantial publication was a volume of religious-patriotic poems-ballads. These were enthusiastically endorsed by Michael Denis, then an important figure on the Vienna literary scene, and Hoffmann was thereby persuaded to follow it up with a series of light-hearted pieces for the popular stage.

In 1782 he moved to Vienna where he entered the service of the Schönfeld publishing business. The coming to power of a new emperor in 1780 had opened the way to a surge in "Enlightenment" thought. Writing either anonymously or under one of a large collection of pseudonyms Hoffmann produced a number of leaflets and contributed to various news-sheets. He would in 1783 become a freemason: much the political tone of his writing during this period was correspondingly radical. His most important platform between 1782 and 1784 was "Weekly Truths for and about Priests in Vienna" ("Wöchentlichen Wahrheiten für und über die Prediger in Wien"), which purported to assess the sermons preached in Vienna churches against the standards of the "Josephine enlightenment" being feverishly rolled out by the state authorities. He took a job as secretary to Lord von Gemmingen-Hornberg who in 1783 became leading writer on "Weekly Truths". It was through von Gemmingen that he came into contact with Vienna freemason and "Illuminati" circles. In April 1783 he was accepted as a member of the "For Good Actions" ("Zur Wohltätigkeit") freemason lodge which was newly established by von Gemmingen and of which, in November 1783, Hoffmann became secretary. Subsequently, there was a falling out between Hoffmann and von Gemmingen. The origins of their differences are not entirely clear. Hoffmann, as lodge secretary, alleged that von Gemmingham had failed to pay his "Honorarium" (membership subscription) and there was talk of broken promises. In 1785 Hoffmann moved away from Vienna, having used his friendship with the well connected diplomat-librarian Gottfried van Swieten, who was much involved in the emperor's education reforms, to obtain a professorship of the German language downriver at Pest University, where he remained till 1790.

In Pest Hoffmann got to know Franz Gotthardi, formerly a bankrupt coffee trader and now a police commissar with a growing proficiency in undercover work. The two became friends and Hoffmann was able to make himself useful as a spy and courier. German speakers were in the minority in Budapest, and those identified as government employees were increasingly unwelcome. As the political temperature rose for Hoffmann and Gotthardi, the two men returned together to Vienna in 1790. Back in Vienna there was another new emperor, and as the bloody aftermath of the French Revolution unfolded in the west, many of the "enlightenment reforms" of the 1780s were being hurriedly reversed, while the free masons and intellectuals who had banged the drum for them were now being denounced as "Jacobins". It was possibly thanks to his friendship with Gotthardi that in 1790 or 1791 Hoffmann received a full professorship for the "German language, Business and Practical Usage" ("Deutsche Sprache, den Geschäftsstil und die praktische Beredsamkeit") at Vienna University, an appointment which seems to have been in the emperor's personal gift. In 1790 Hoffmann had produced two pamphlets entitled "Babel" and "Ninive" opposing the rebellious Hungarians: these had failed to impress Emperor Leopold. "The fellow is an ass, I know," the emperor is reported as saying, "but he renders me excellent service as a spy". However, by the time Leopold died, in March 1792, Hoffmann's usefulness as a spy had evidently gained him the emperor's trust.

As the 1790s progressed Leopold Alois Hoffmann became increasingly shrill in his reactionary views, displaying the passion of the true convert. He fulminated robustly in his newly formed "Wiener Zeitschrift" ("Vienna News-sheet"), blaming the enlightenment for the French Revolution, while denouncing as "Jacobins" his former brother free masons and other enlightenment partisans to his new friends in the police. His eloquent hypocrisy did not go unchallenged. Another pamphleteer, Franz Xaver Huber, used his own news-sheet "The Political Sieve" ("Das politische Sieb") to attack Hoffmann in an article with the rhetorical title "Can a novelist such as Professor Hoffmann [be permitted to] have influence over the mood of the German people and over the thought patterns of Princes?" It is apparent from the title that, at least for some people, Hoffmann had become identified as some kind of "Éminence grise" behind the throne, able to whisper in the emperor's ear. Nor was Huber's the only attack. Alxinger's "Anti-Hoffmann" appeared in 1792 as did Knigge's anonymously published satire, "The sainted Mr Secretary of state Samuel Conrad of Schaafskopf's left behind papers" ("Des seligen Herrn Etatsraths Samuel Conrad von Schaafskopf hinterlassene Papiere"), followed in 1793 by a contribution from Dalberg.

However, it was not so much the polemical writing of opponents as the death of the emperor, in March 1792, that effectively ended Hoffmann's career. Under the new emperor an investigation was launched against Prof. Hoffmann whose suitability as a teacher had been called into doubt. Hoffmann was forced to close down his "Wiener Zeitschrift" and, at the end of the investigation, was retired on a relatively modest pension. Embittered, he relocated to Wiener Neustadt, a short distance outside Vienna on its south side, where he lived for the rest of his life, still publishing aggressive pieces which some contemporaries - especially in Hungary – interpreted as part of some masonic conspiracy.

Along with his poetry, Hoffmann published a number of plays, some of which enjoyed brief production runs at Vienna's Burgtheater ("Court Theatre"). Sources indicate that his overall output was not of great literary significance, however.

Hoffmann died at his Wiener Neustadt home on 2 September 1806. He was quickly forgotten. It was only when commentators and historians started to focus on the post war reaction and repression of the Metternich years that interest in Leopold Alois Hoffmann's life and works re-surfaced.
