= County of Bretzenheim =

Former territory of the Holy Roman Empire

Imperial County of Bretzenheim Reichsgrafschaft Bretzenheim*
- 1790–1804
- Coat of arms of Bretzenheim
- Status: County
- Capital: Bretzenheim
- Common languages: West Central German
- Historical era: Napoleonic Wars
  - Partitioned from the Electorate of the Palatinate: 1790 1790
  - Raised to princely county: 1789
  - Part-mediatised to Hesse-Darmstadt; granted County of Lindau am Bodensee: 1803
  - Mediatised to Austria: 1804
Preceded by	Succeeded by
Electorate of the Palatinate / Electorate of the Palatinate	Landgraviate of Hesse-Darmstadt; Archduchy of Austria
- * Later Reichsfürstentum Bretzenheim, Imperial princely county of Bretzenheim

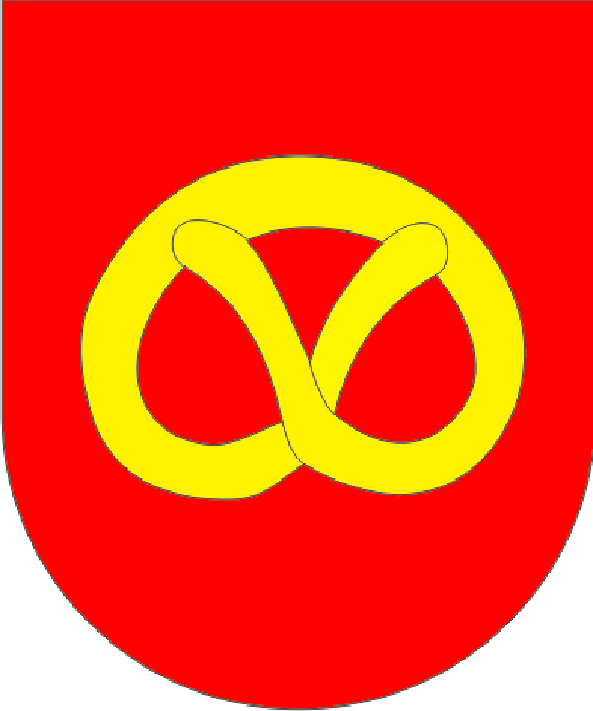
Coat of arms of Bretzenheim

Bretzenheim was the centre of a minor principality in pre-Napoleonic Germany. It was created in 1790 for Prince Charles Augustus (1769-1823) of the line of Wittelsbach-Bretzenheim, illegitimate son of Charles Theodore, Elector of Bavaria and Palatinate and Josepha von Heydeck.

== History ==
Its territory in central Germany was mediatised to Hesse-Darmstadt in 1803, and its territory north of Lake Constance (former imperial city of Lindau) was mediatised to Austria in 1804.

Before 1789-1790 it was an Imperial Lordship and it had some important rulers, including Ambrosius Franz, Count of Virmont. In 1772 the Elector of Palatinate bought the Lordship (Imperial County 1774) for his son.

== Prince of Bretzenheim ==
- Charles Augustus (1790–1804)
