= Worms Cathedral =

- St. Peter's Cathedral
- Wormser Dom
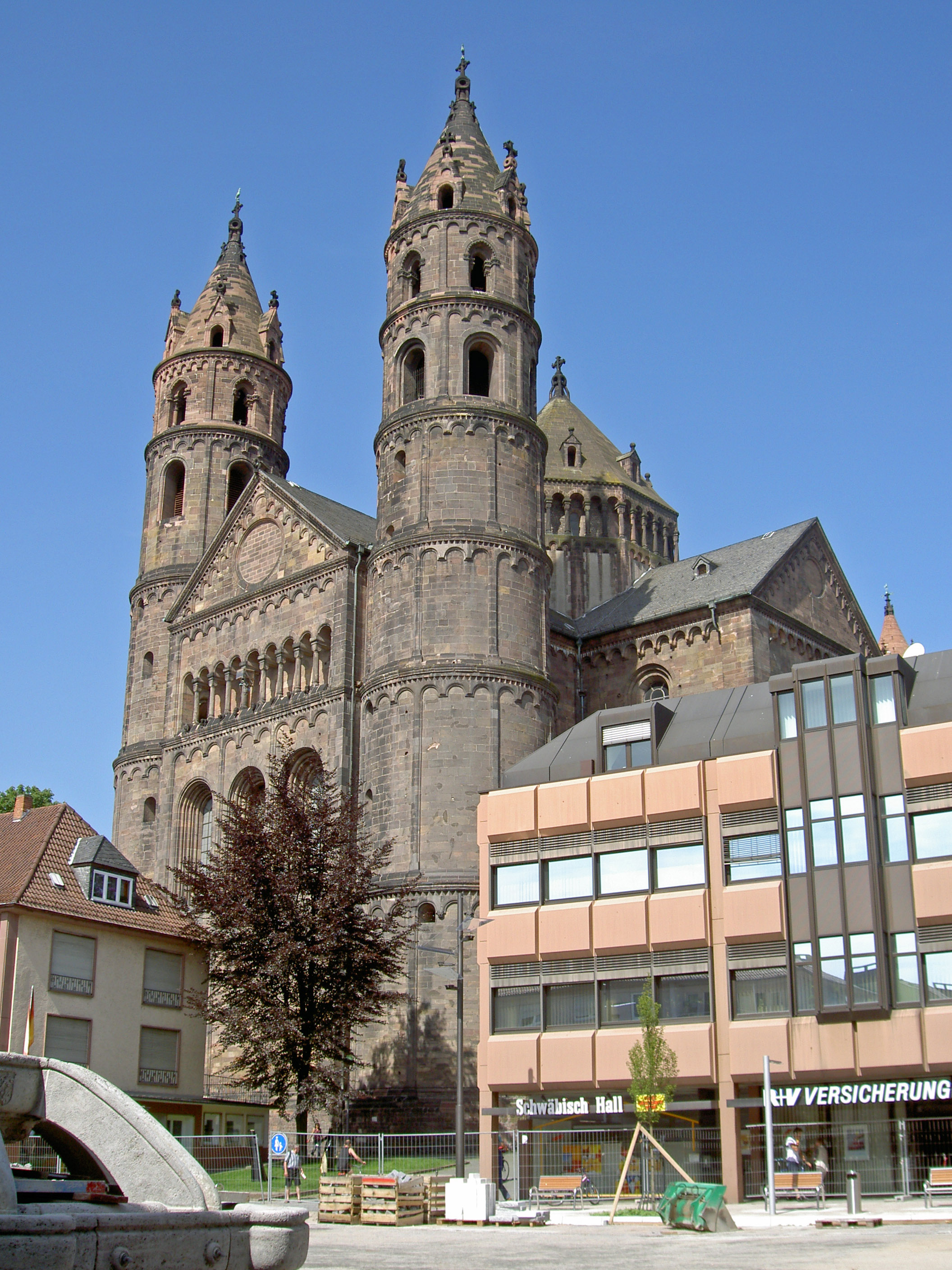
- The east end of the Cathedral.
- Worms Cathedral
- 49°37′49″N 8°21′35″E
- Location: Worms, Rhineland-Palatinate
- Country: Germany
- Denomination: Roman Catholic
- Website: pg-dom-st-peter-worms.bistummainz.de/index.html

History
- Former name: Cathedral Church of St. Peter of Worms
- Founder: Berthulf of Worms

Architecture
- Previous cathedrals: 2
- Architectural type: Romanesque
- Years built: 1130–1181, 13th century (vaulting), 14th century ( central dome rebuilt)

Administration
- Province: Freiburg
- Diocese: Mainz

Clergy
- Pastor: Max Wagner

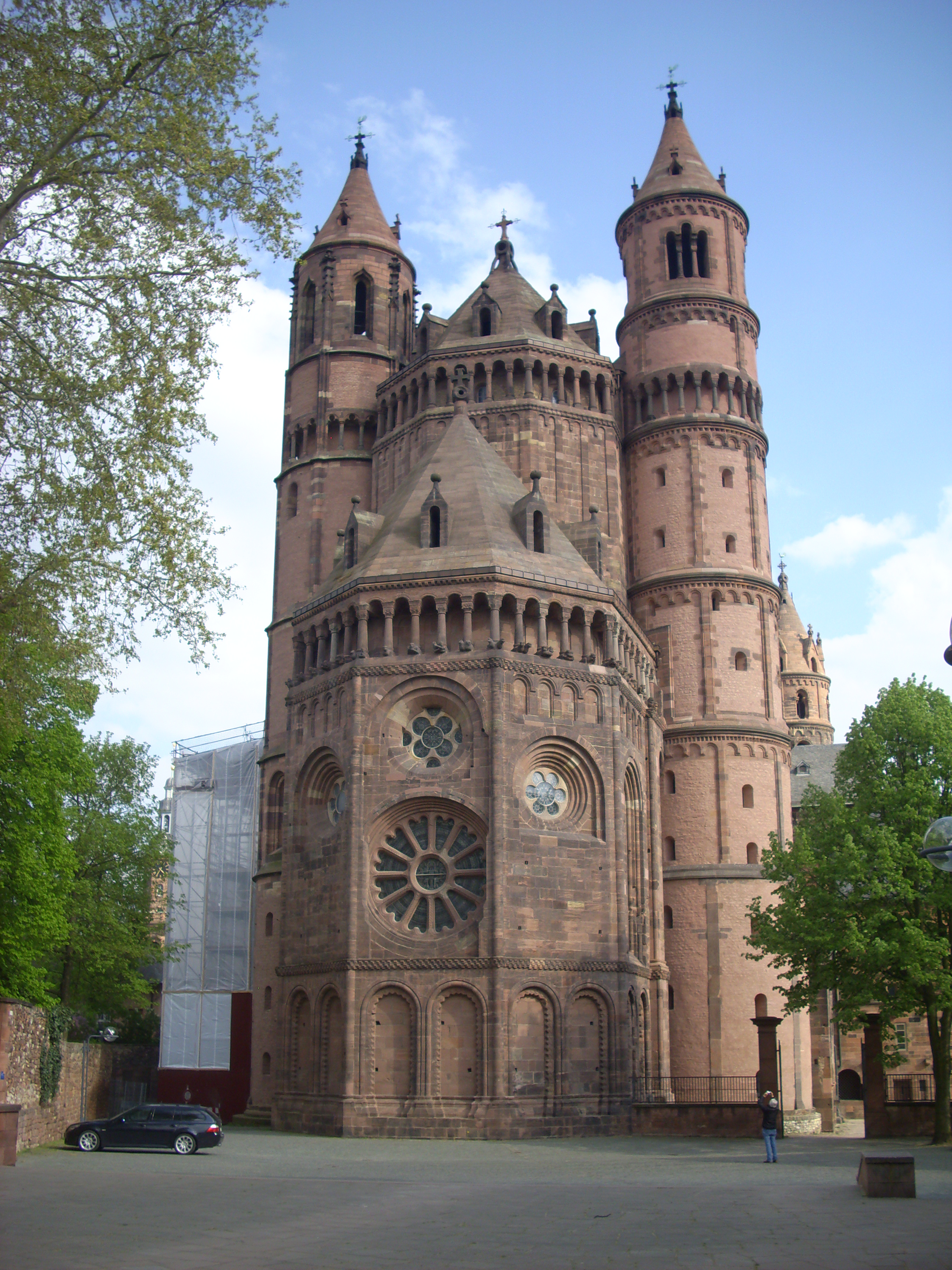
St Peter's Cathedral: West end

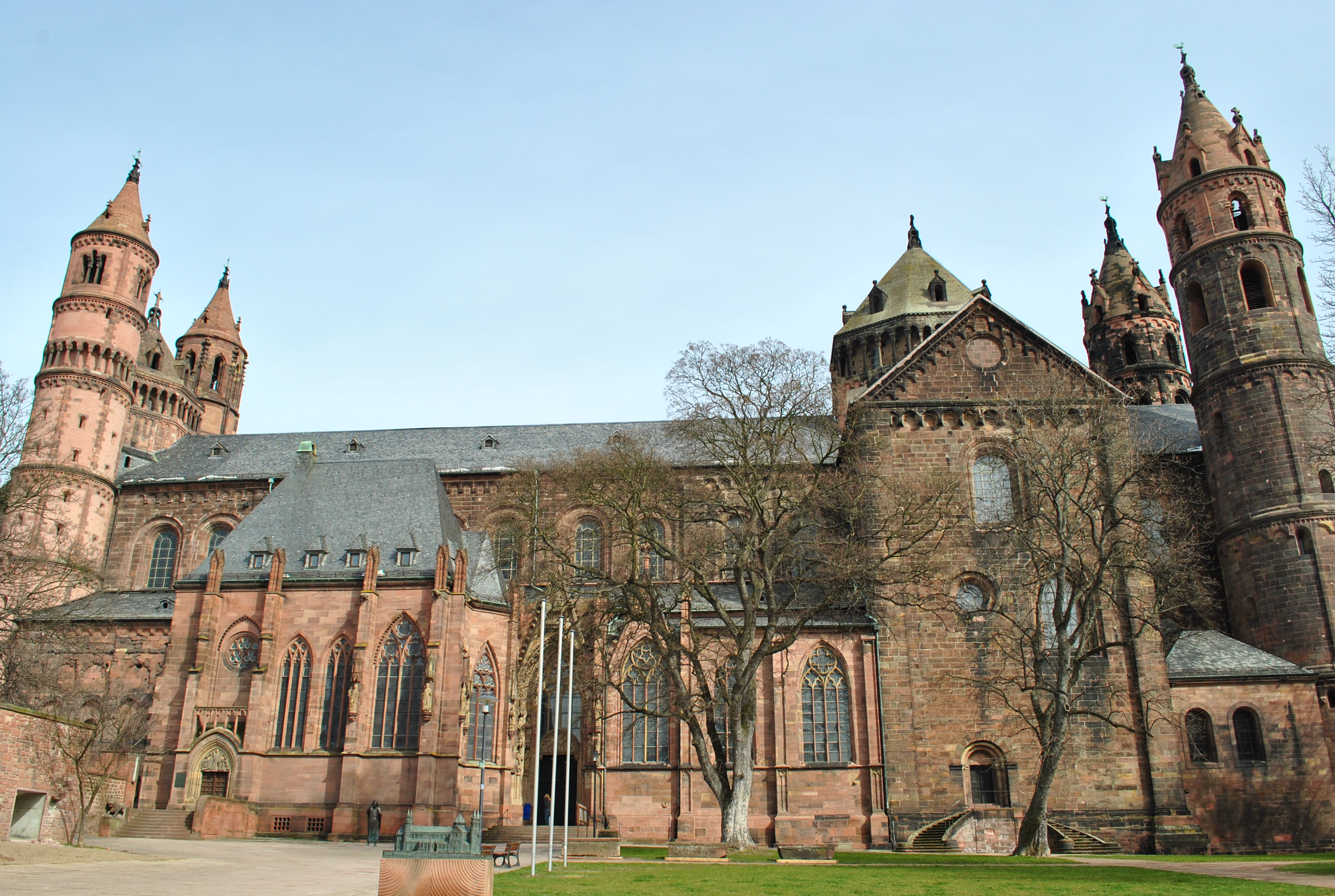
St Peter's Cathedral – South façade

St Peter's Cathedral (German: Wormser Dom) is a Roman Catholic church and former cathedral in Worms, southern Germany.

The cathedral is located on the highest point of the inner city of Worms and is the most important building of the Romanesque style in Worms. It is closely associated with Bishop Burchard and the high point of Worms' history in the 12th and 13th centuries. It was the seat of the Catholic Prince-Bishopric of Worms until its extinction in 1802, during German mediatisation, whose prince-bishops resided next door in the Bischofshof palace.

After the extinction of the bishopric, it was reduced in status to that of a parish church; however, it was bestowed the title of minor basilica in 1925 by Pope Pius XI.

Most of the cathedral was finished by 1181, however the west choir and the vaulting were built in the 13th century, the elaborate south portal was added in the 14th century, and the central dome has been rebuilt.

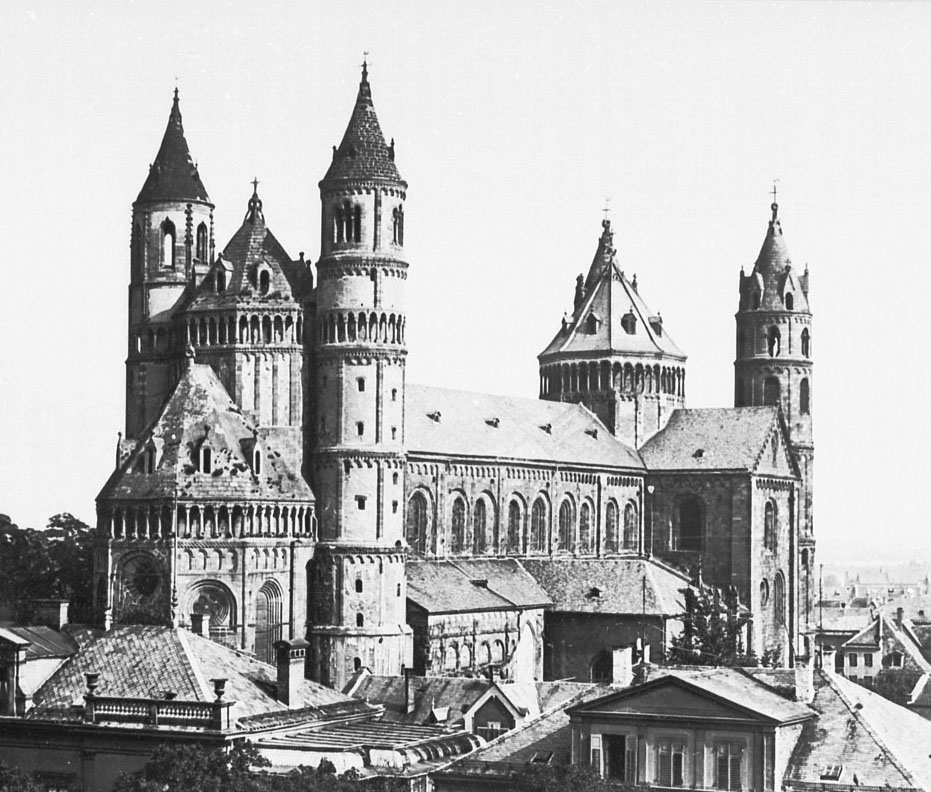
St Peter's Cathedral before 1901

Great events associated with the cathedral include the nomination of Leo IX as Pope in 1048, the Concordat of Worms which ended the Investiture controversy in 1122, the marriage of Emperor Frederick II to Isabella of England in 1235 and the Diet of Worms in 1521, during which Martin Luther was condemned as a heretic.

== History ==
=== Before the cathedral ===
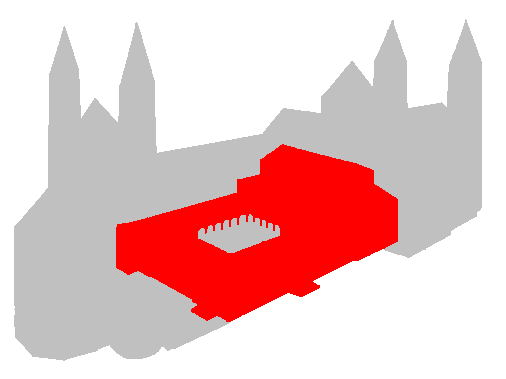
The current structure compared with the Roman forum

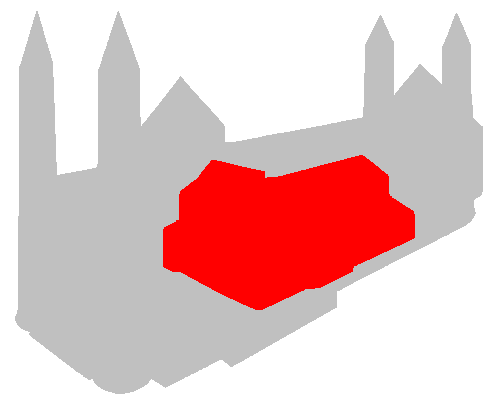
The current structure compared with the Merovingian basilica

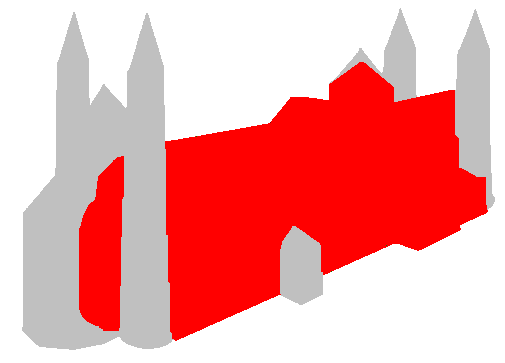
The current structure compared with the cathedral of Bishop Burchard of Worms

St Peter's Cathedral is located on the highest hill in the city. Since this hill was safe from flooding, it has been inhabited by people since the third millennium BC. Celtic inhabitants were succeeded by the Germanic tribe of the Vangiones, after whom the area around Worms received the name Wonnegau. They were conquered by the Romans who established a commercial centre and temple area on the hill. The decline of the Roman Empire led to the abandonment of the Roman garrison at Worms in 401. Twelve years later, the Burgundians took over Worms after they were settled within the empire by the Romans with the task of protecting the empire's borders. When they sought to shake off Roman overlordship in 435, they were defeated in battle by the Romans.

=== Church of Brunichildis ===
After the Battle of the Catalaunian Fields, the Franks came into the Rhine valley and took over Worms by force. At the same time they converted to Christianity. When the Frankish realm was divided into three parts under the Merovingians, Worms belonged to Austrasia. After the rulers of Austrasia and Neustria married each other's sisters, a war broke out, which led to the death of both rulers and one of the sisters. The widow of the Austrasian ruler, Brunichildis lived at Worms around 600 AD. She and her successor, Dagobert I had a church built on top of the foundations of the Roman forum, according to medieval sources. This church was a predecessor of the current building. There is no archaeological evidence for this church. Excavations carried out at the beginning of the twentieth century suggest a larger predecessor build which (given its size) was probably Carolingian. Whether this was an expansion of a Merowingian building or not, is unclear.

=== Cathedral of Bishop Burchard of Worms ===
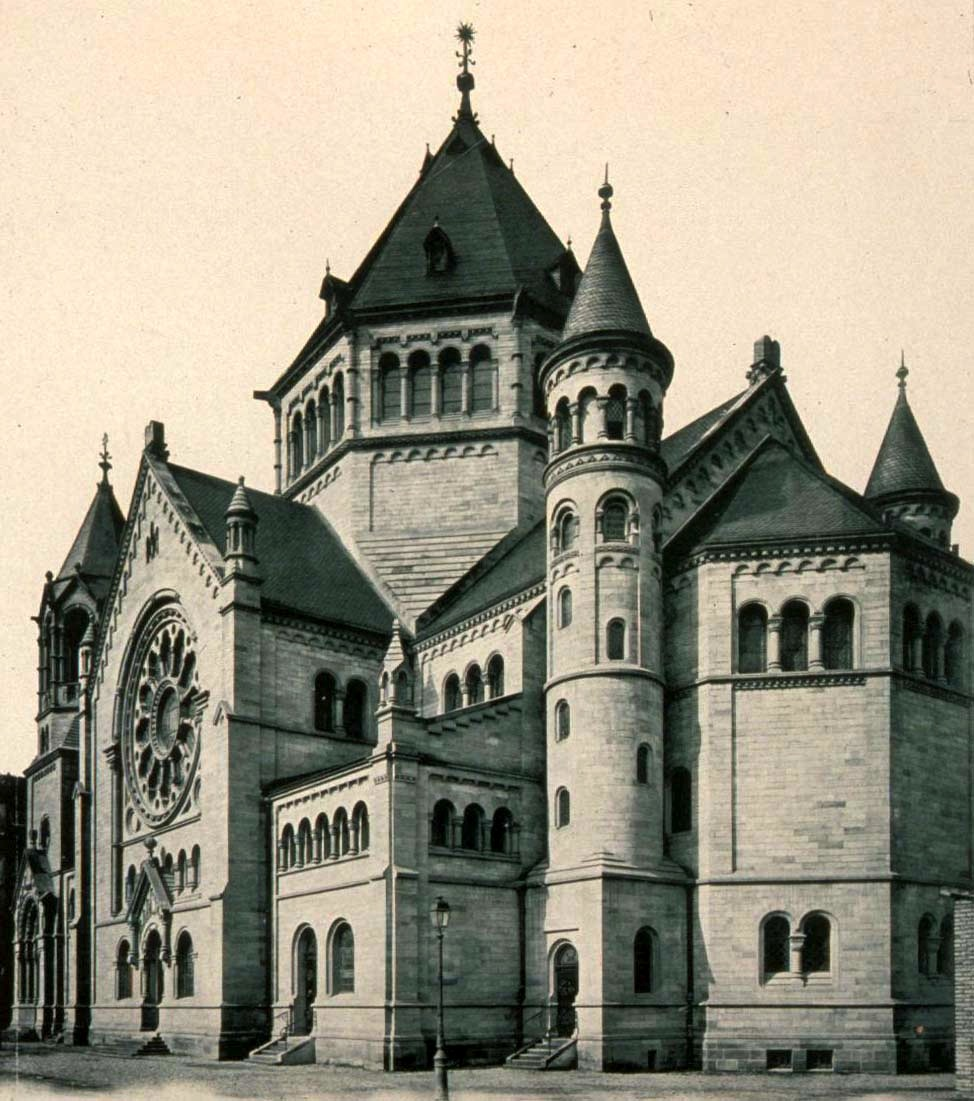
The Strasbourg synagogue modelled on Worms Cathedral.

Berthulf was the first known Bishop of Worms in 614. A new church was laid out, with the dimensions of the current building, under Bishop Burchard of Worms at the beginning of the 11th century. He succeeded in persuading the Salians to abandon their fort in the city, on which he erected the Paulus Stift from 1002/3. The old cathedral was demolished and the construction of the new one occurred simultaneously. It was a cross-shaped basilica with two semicircular choirs, built on an east–west orientation. In 1018, the cathedral was consecrated in the presence of the Emperor, but the western part of the building collapsed only two years later and had to be rebuilt. The church had a flat wooden roof. According to Burchard's biography, the cathedral was magnificently furnished in the 1030s and 1040s. Thus there is mention of columns with golden capitals (which cannot have been the church's main columns). Most likely, Burchard's cathedral was a pier-basilica, since no remains of columns (difficult to acquire in the 11th century anyway) have been found.

Only the foundations of the west towers and the treasury north of the choir, which was probably built at the end of the 11th century, survived subsequent rebuilding.

In 1110, the cathedral was consecrated for the second time. More damage had probably occurred, whose removal was followed by this renewed consecration.

=== Cathedral of Bishop Burchard II of Worms ===
The rebuilding in the 12th century resulted, essentially, in the current cathedral. Around 1130, probably because of further damage to the building, Bishop Burchard II began the demolition of the church build by his predecessor Burchard I and the construction of a new church. The eastern apse, crossing with cupola and transept with its towers (except of their upper storeys) were completed by him in the period up to c.1144. The nave and the western choir and towers were erected between 1160 and 1181 by his successors, Conrad I and Conrad II. The latter consecrated it on 2 May 1181. With this dating, the time of construction was identical with the first phase of Gothic style, called Primary Gothic. Pointed arch rib vaults were built in Worms Cathedral in time with the first Gothic rib vaults, but with simpler cross sections of the ribs. Besides the application of actual vaulting, the design of the church building was very conservative, even conservative in relation to Cluny III, which was more than forty years older. All gates and windows and the arcades and groined vaults of the aisles have hemicircular arches. This combination of innovative vaults of the tall room sections with Romanesque walls makes the cathedral a major example of Late Romanesque style.

The western choir is lit by a condensed group of four round windows, the largest of them a veritable rose window. The footplan of the western choir is polygonal, outside and inside, the first polygonal choir of a top class church. It even influenced French Gothic; until 1181, and thus throughout Primary Gothic, all apses, ambulatories and chapels of Gothic churches had had semicircular footplans, but since 1185, with the second choir of Pontigny Abbey, most Gothic churches were built with polygonal apses, ambulatories and chapels.

The top storeys of the towers were built after the consecration and show some Gothic details.

Several religious buildings of the area are modelled on the cathedral's decoration, such that one can speak of a "Worms Style." Additionally, the elevation resembles the imperial cathedrals in Speyer and Mainz. The gradual progress of the rebuild can be charted with dendrochronology. Lamps were donated for the west choir in 1172 and Bishop Conrad II was buried there in 1192.

=== Renovations of Johannes von Dalberg ===
About a hundred years after the third consecration, the construction of the Chapel of St Nicholas was begun. A new south portal was built, east of which two more chapels for St Anne and St George were built in the first quarter of the fourteenth century.

Northwestern tower (left); above and below the gallery, the walls are of brick.

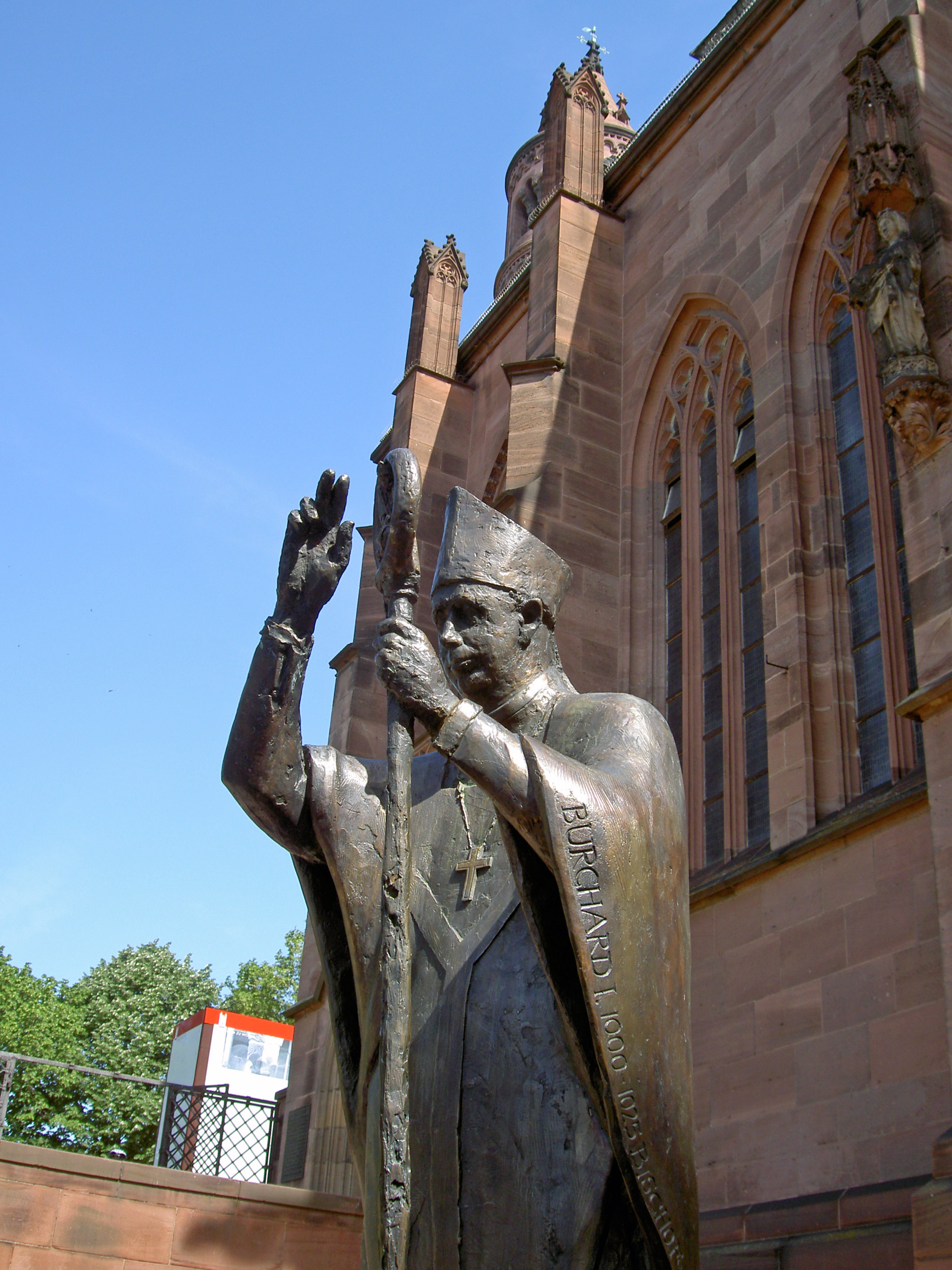
Bishop Burchard of Worms

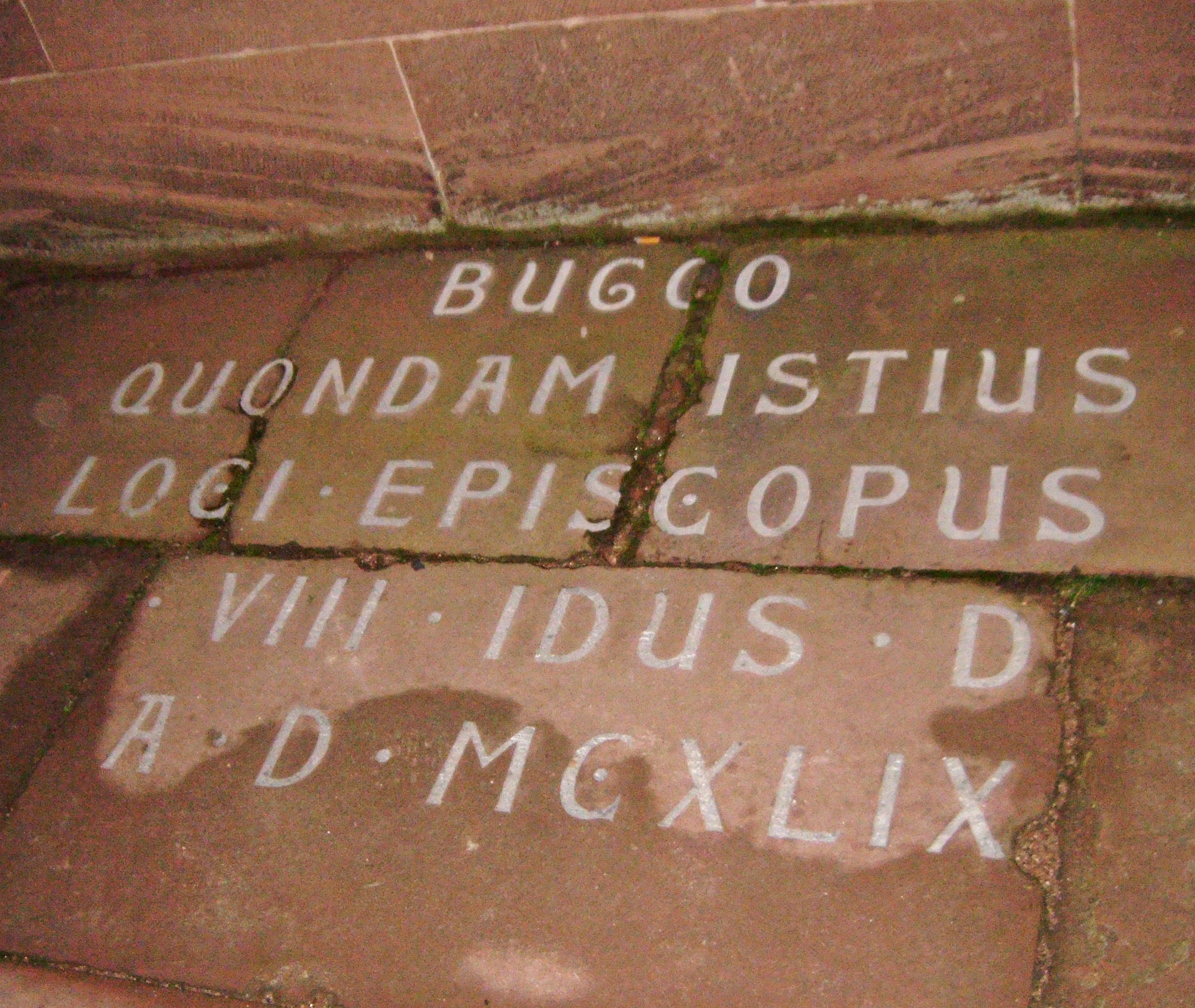
Tomb inscription of Burchard II, in the outer part of the Dom

In 1429, the northwestern tower scrolled due to an earthquake. It was rebuilt until 1472, with all Gothic details, but strictly in the shape of scrolled tower. Thus it is an extremely early example of conserving restoration. Nevertheless, there was a change of materials, nearly half of the outer walls were built of brick, in colour not very different from the reddish sandstone of the other walls of the cathedral.

The Aegidius chapel (St Giles chapel, nowadays St Mary chapel) was built adjacent to the eastern part of the north aisle, in 1480/1485.

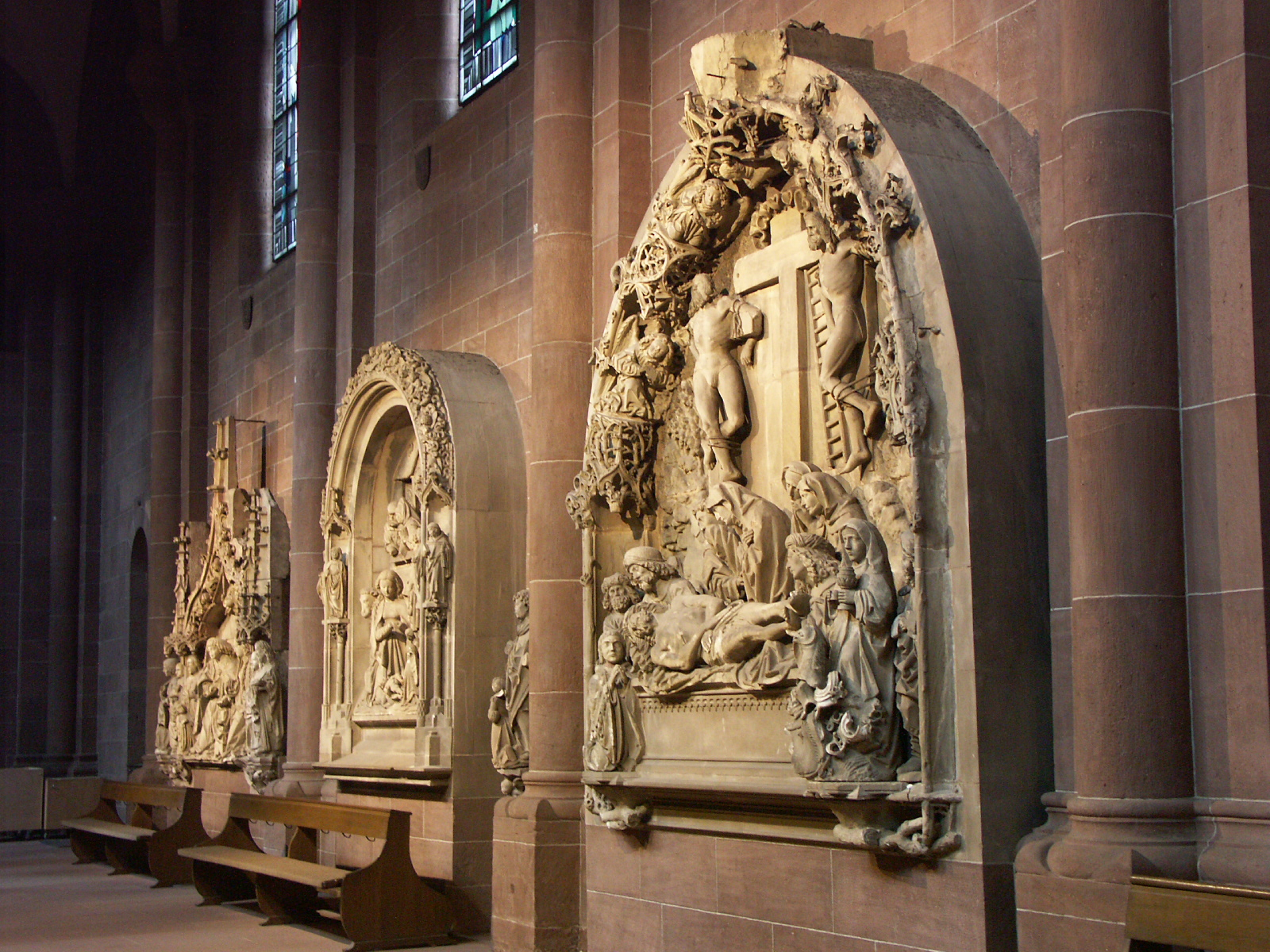
Gothic reliefs from the abandoned cloisters

Towards the end of the century, under Bishop Johann von Dalberg, the original Romanesque cloisters (west of the Chapel of St Nicholas) were renovated, resulting in five monumental late Gothic reliefs on the life of Jesus which are now located in the north side-aisle of the cathedral: Tree of Jesse (1488), Annunciation (1487), birth of Christ (1515), entombment (c.1490) and the resurrection (c.1490). A sixth relief depicting the crucifixion was probably lost in the destruction of 1689. In the Andreasstift (Worms) there are four large round keystones about 88 cm (35 in) in diameter decorated with coats of arms, which derive from the cloisters and were donated by Bishop Ruprecht of Regensberg, and Canons Philipp von Flersheim, Erpho von Gemmingen and Wilhelm von Stockheim. Another cloister keystone belonging to the Archbishop of Cologne and cathedral scholaster Hermann IV of Hesse is now located above the entrance of Neuburg Abbey Church in Heidelberg. The foundation stone of the cloisters from the year 1484, which had been thought lost, was found during cleaning in the Dom's lapidarium at the end of February 2014.

=== Protestant Reformation to French Revolution ===
The importance of the diocese and the cathedral at Worms derives from the Diet of Worms in 1521. Shortly after the diet, some Worms congregations converted to the teachings of Martin Luther. In 1556, all parishes in the Palatinate followed suit.

During the Thirty Years War, Swedish troops held the city from 1632 to 1635 and the cathedral was used for Protestant services.

In the Nine Years War, Heidelberg, Mannheim, Speyer and Worms were devastated at the command of King Louis XIV. Churches were plundered and, though the attempt to blow up the cathedral failed, it was heavily damaged by fire. Bishop Franz Ludwig von Pfalz-Neuberg had the cathedral restored in 1698. Some baroque elements date to this time, like the windows of the silver chamber and the high altar of Balthasar Neumann.

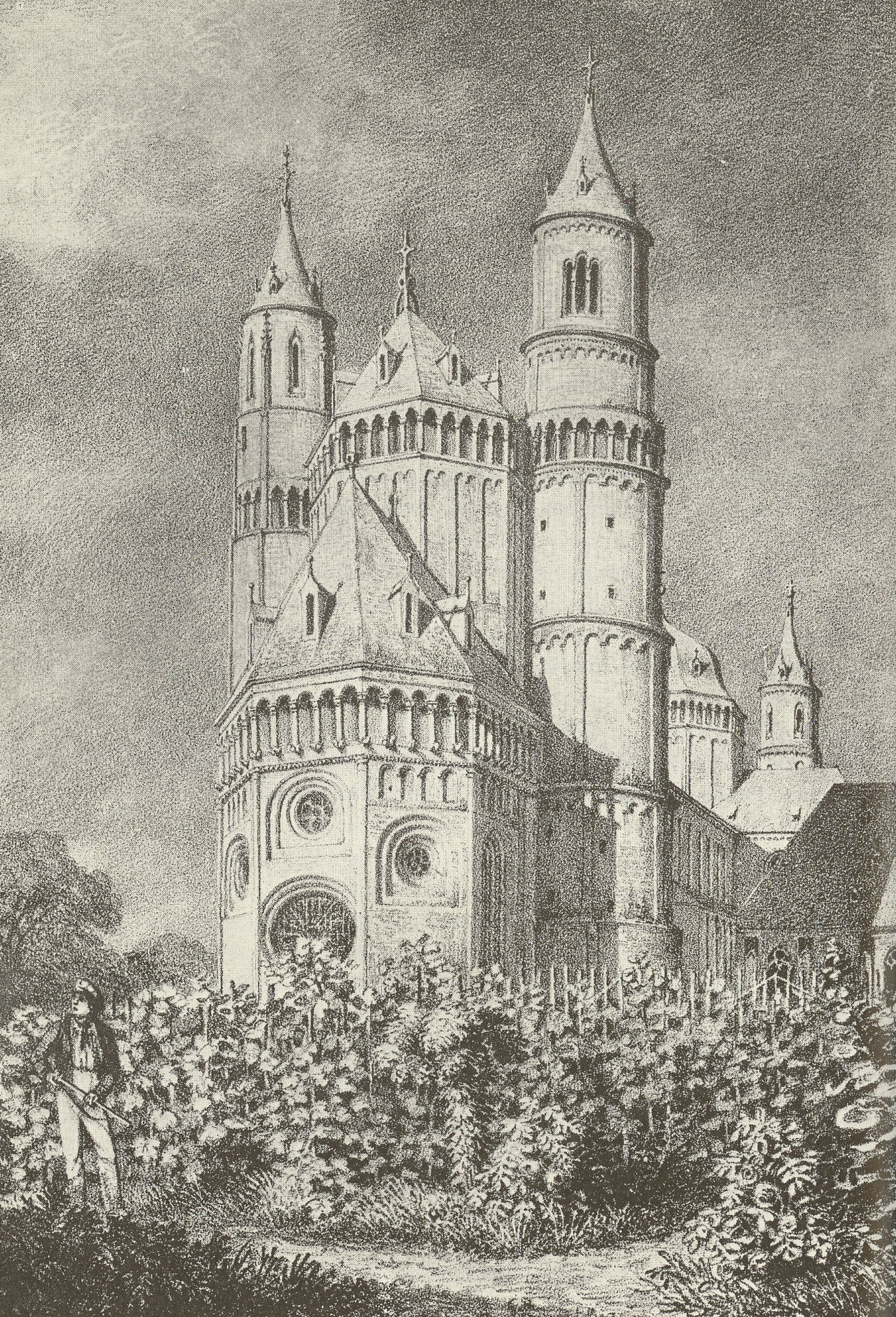
St Peter's Cathedral, 1824

The renovation of the cathedral was nullified by French Revolutionary troops. At the end of 1792, Speyer, Worms, Mainz and Frankfurt were sacked by revolutionary troops. It served as a stable and a tavern. Between 1818 and 1830 the cloisters were demolished and the stones from it were auctioned off.

=== Renovation 1886–1935 ===
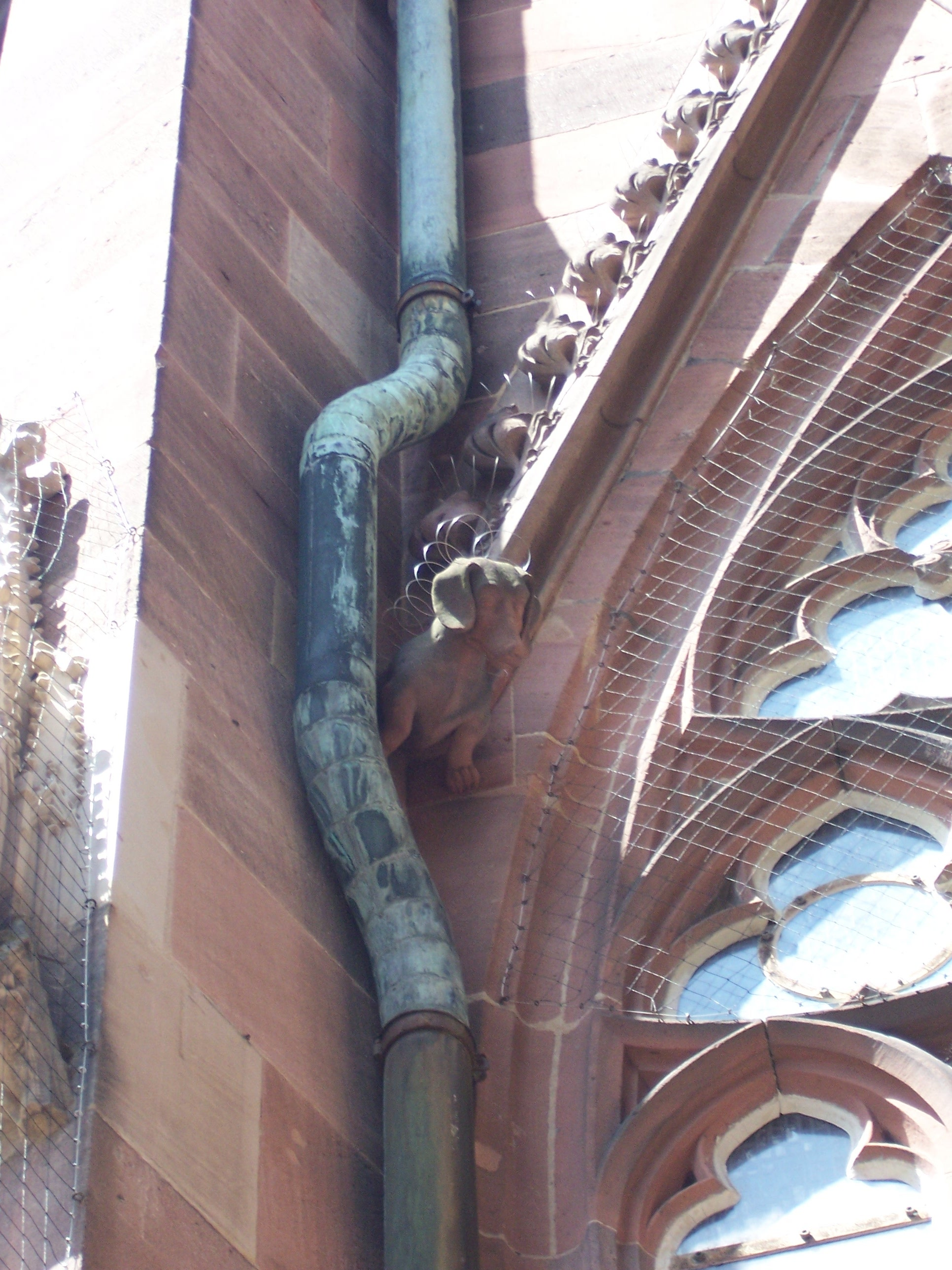
Dachshund statue on the south portal, 1920

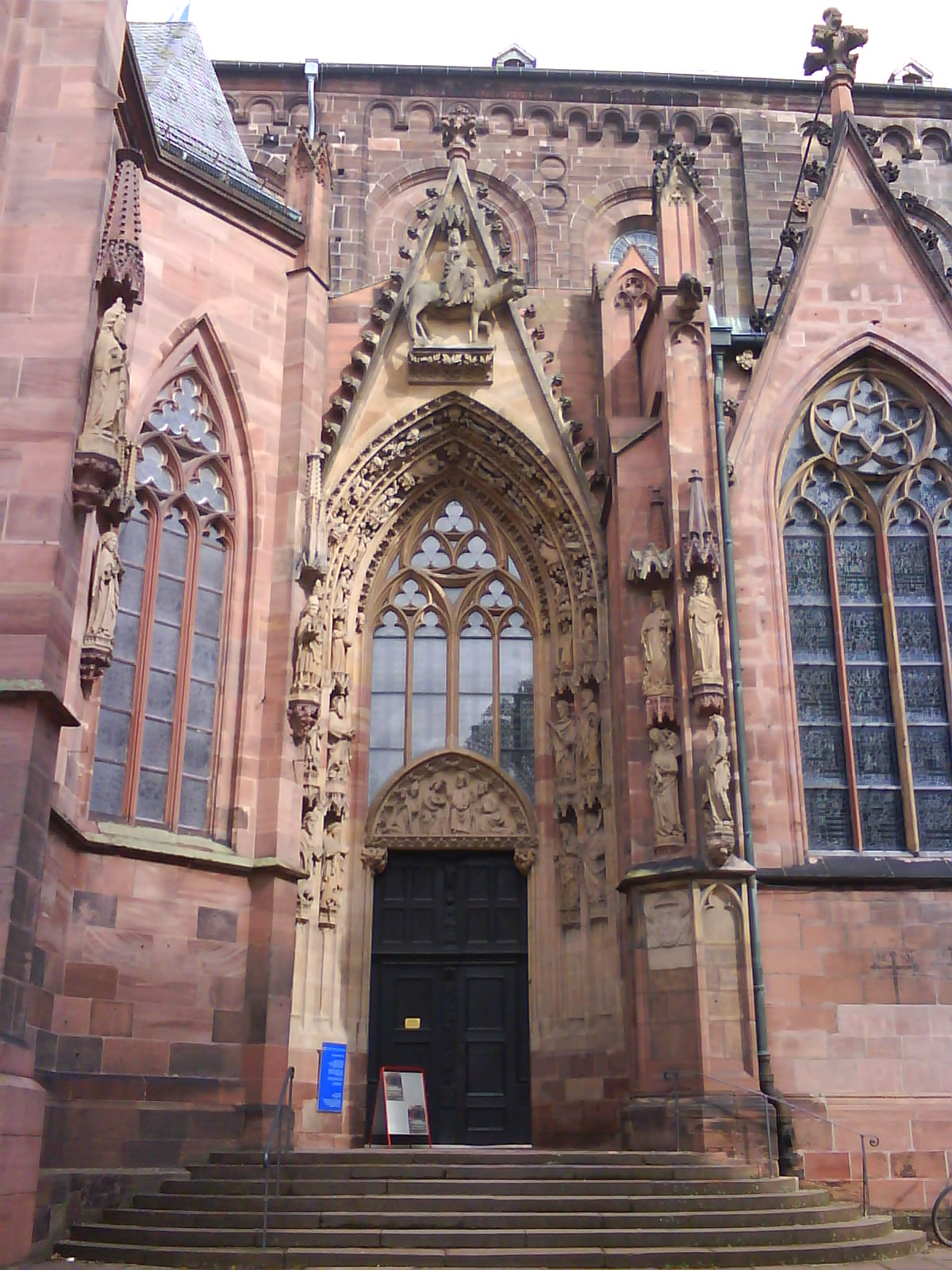
South portal

A full renovation of St Peter's Cathedral only began in 1886. Because of structural weaknesses and damage suffered in the fire of 1689, the west choir had to be completely rebuilt. Great importance was placed on reusing as much of the original stone as possible. In the outer wall this was taken so far that today all but a small portion of the old stones are in their original locations. On the inside wall, large flat stones had to be used and faithfully reconstructed. The sharply bent dosseret over the central rosette window was not rebuilt since it was blamed for the structural issues. Today the dosserets run perpendicular to the edge of the rosette and frame it clearly. The general renovations, which also included renovation of the chapel of St Nicholas, the reconstruction of the whole floor and the addition of an entirely new crypt for the tombs of the Salians under the high choir, were only completed in 1935.

In the course of the renovation work, in 1920 the head architect, Philipp Brand, was standing on the scaffolding when a dachshund attacked, and attempted to bite him on the leg. He stepped to the side and as a result escaped from a falling stone which had broken loose above him, killing the dog. In the upper left of the south portal, at the edge of the window in the left corner is a statue of the dachshund – Philipp Brand had this installed as a small memorial.

In the Allied bombing on 21 February and 18 March 1945, the cathedral was damaged by a bomb, which did not affect the interior. The roof burned but the vaults remained intact.

== Architecture ==
The cathedral is a pier-basilica with two choirs and a transept. A central tower is located on the crossing, another over the western choir. Both choirs are flanked by two round staircase towers. The nave is vaulted in various ways: the central aisle has rib vaulting, while the side aisles have groin vaults. The apse of the west choir takes the form of an octagon and is decorated with various rosette windows

=== Glass windows ===
As a result of the Oppau explosion on 21 September 1921, nothing remains of the Medieval glass windows.

The contemporary glass of the cathedral is quite varied. As well as simple clear or milky glass in the transepts, are complicated pictorial windows, especially in the chapels, like the coloured glass windows of Heinz Hindorf in the Chapel of Mary, which depict scenes from Mary's life and the Fourteen Holy Helpers (1986–1988), and the Geschichtsfenster (1992) in the Chapel of St George, which depict the history of the diocese of Worms in 20 scenes, from the first known bishop, Victor, in 345 to the destruction of the city in the Second World War. An unusual political statement is found in the depiction of the Biblis Nuclear Power Plant as the Tower of Babel in a series of examples of human sinfulness.

=== Burials ===
==== Sarcophagi in the Crypt ====
Four Salian princes were buried in the altar space of the Frankish church and were then built over. Another five followed by 1046. These are the ancestors and relatives of Emperor Conrad II:

Salian crypt

1. Conrad the Red, Duke of Lorraine (Great-grandfather) † 955,
2. Judith, Duchess of Carinthia (Grandmother) † 991,
3. Henry, Count of Wormsgau (Father) † 990/991,
4. Judith (Sister) † 998,
5. Conrad I, Duke of Carinthia (Uncle) † 1011
6. Matilda (wife of the preceding) † 1031/32,
7. Queen Matilda † 1034, consort of Henry I of France and daughter of Conrad II (transferred to Worms in 1046),
8. Conrad II, Duke of Carinthia (Cousin, son of Conrad I) † 1039,
9. Bishop Azecho, Successor of Bishop Burchard, † 1044.

These sarcophagi have been located in a specially built crypt since the beginning of the 20th century.

Since the floor level of the transept and the east choir is over six metres above ground level, one must assume that there was a crypt below it.

==== Graves ====
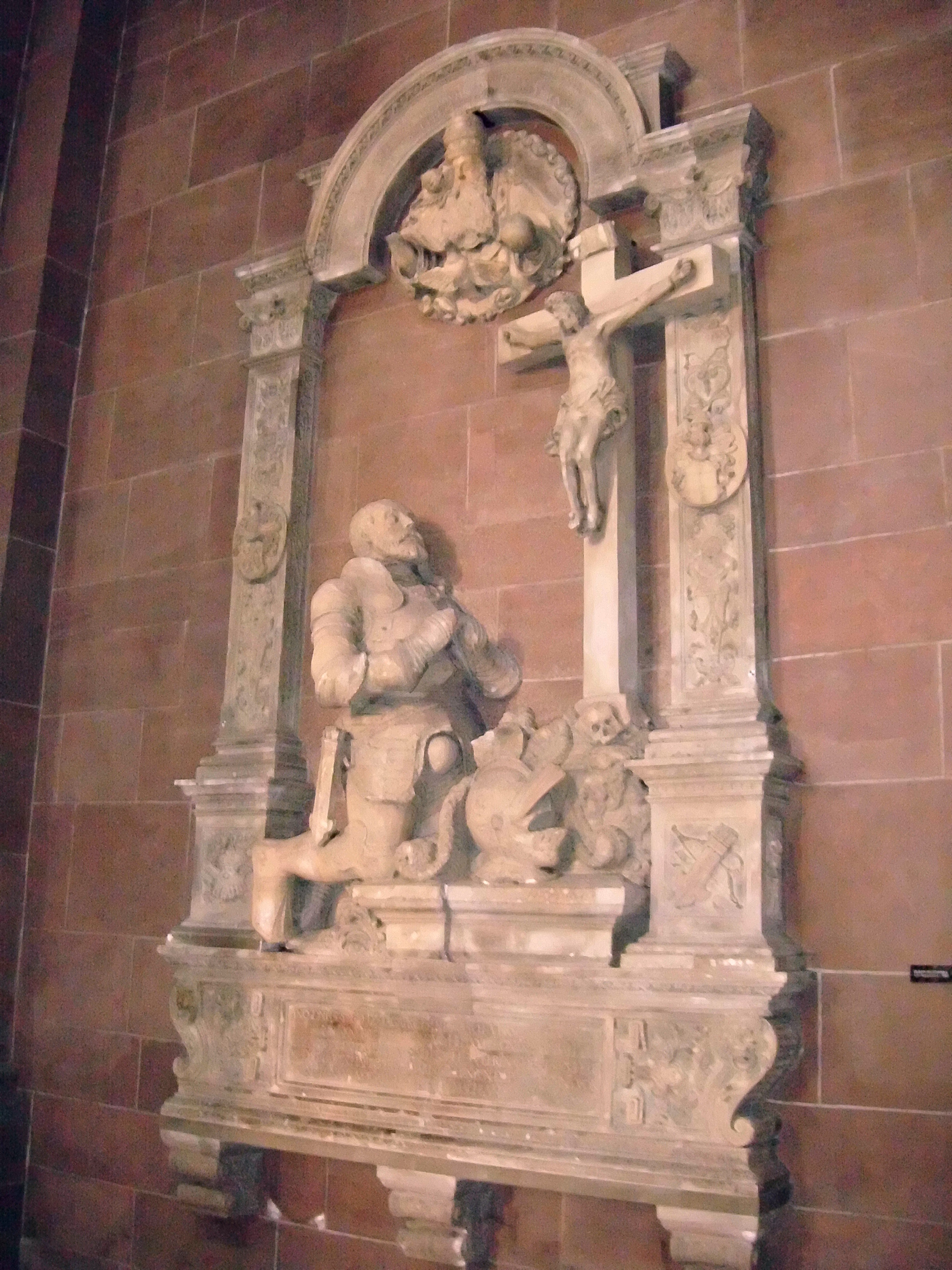
Funerary monument of Canon Eberhard of Heppenheim genannt vom Saal († 1559)

There are a number of grave monuments, gravestones and grave plates in the cathedral, including:

- Reinbold Beyer of Boppard († 1364), brother of Bishop Dietrich Bayer of Boppard († 1384)
- Dietrich of Bettendorf (1518–1580), Deacon and Bishop of Worms
- Wilhelm of Efferen (1563–1616), Bishop of Worms
- Eberhard of Heppenheim († 1559), Canon, nephew of Dom-deacon of Speyer
- Johannes of Heppenheim († 1555)
- Franz Rudolph of Hettersdorf (1675–1729), Canon and donor of the Nicholas altar
- Johann Adam of Hoheneck († 1731), Deacon of Worms
- Johann Franz Jakob Anton of Hoheneck (1686–1758), Canon of Worms, Deacon of Mainz
- Landolf of Hoheneck († 1247), Bishop of Worms, posthumous epitaph from 1756
- Franz Carl Friedrich of Hohenfeld (1696–1757), Deacon
- Christoph Jodok of Ketteler (1661–1735), Canon
- Philipp of Rodenstein (1564–1604), Bishop of Worms
- Georg of Schönenberg (1530–1595), Bishop of Worms, donated the George altar for his tomb

(outside in the former cloisters)

- Burchard II, also Bucco or Buggo († 1149), Bishop of Worms and builder of the Ostwerk of the Dom.

=== Chapel of St Nicholas ===
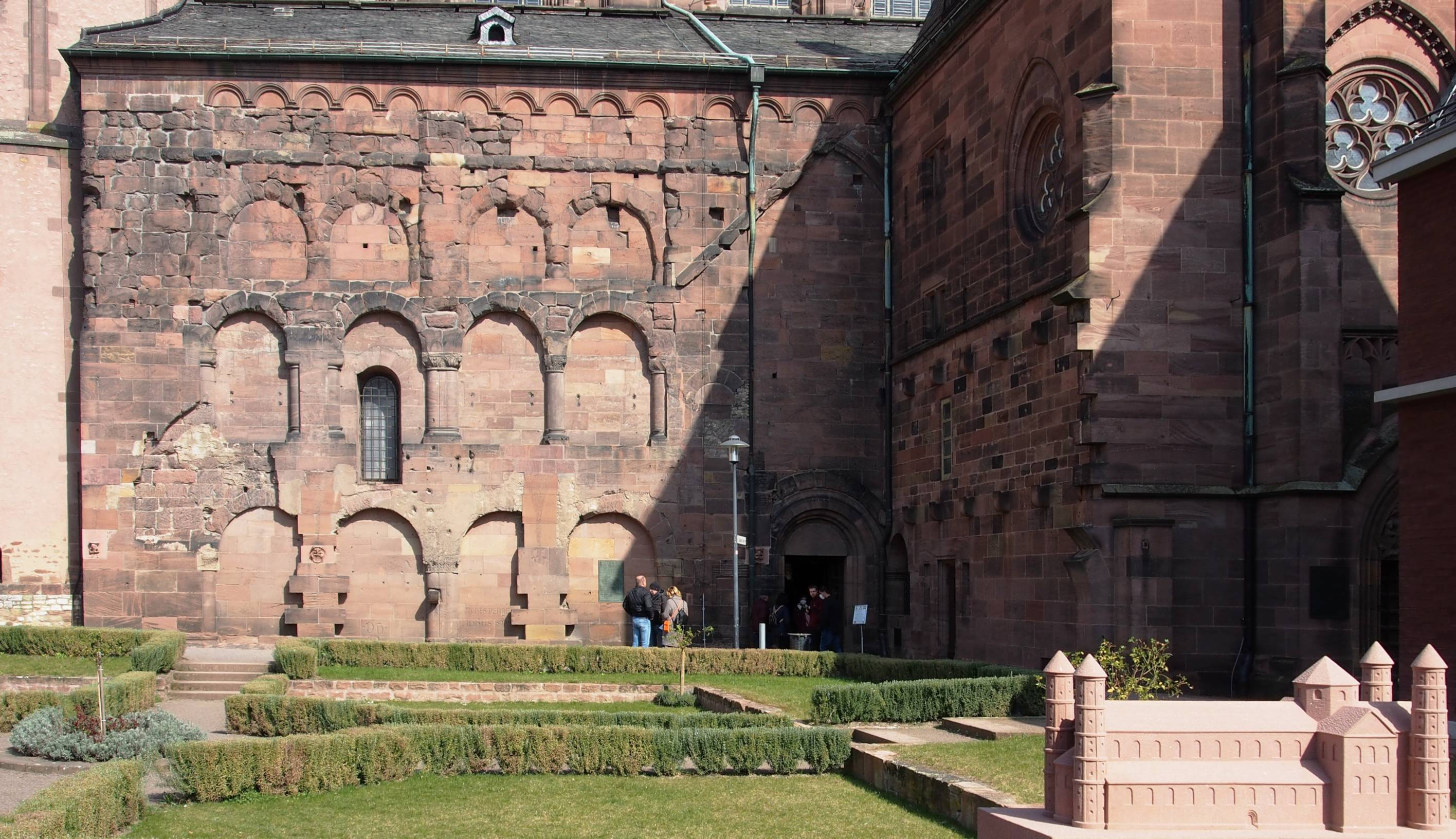
Relicts of the cloister

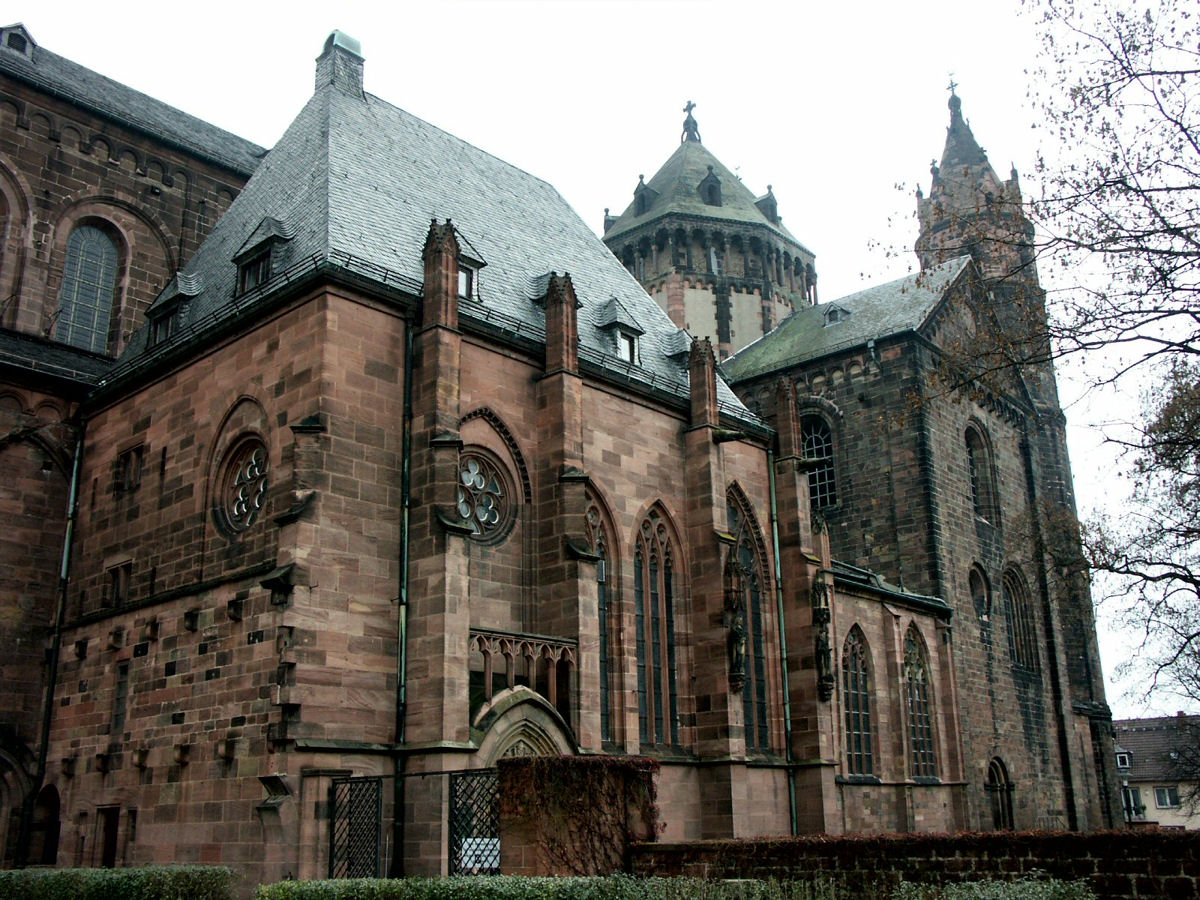
New Chapel of St Nicholas, exterior

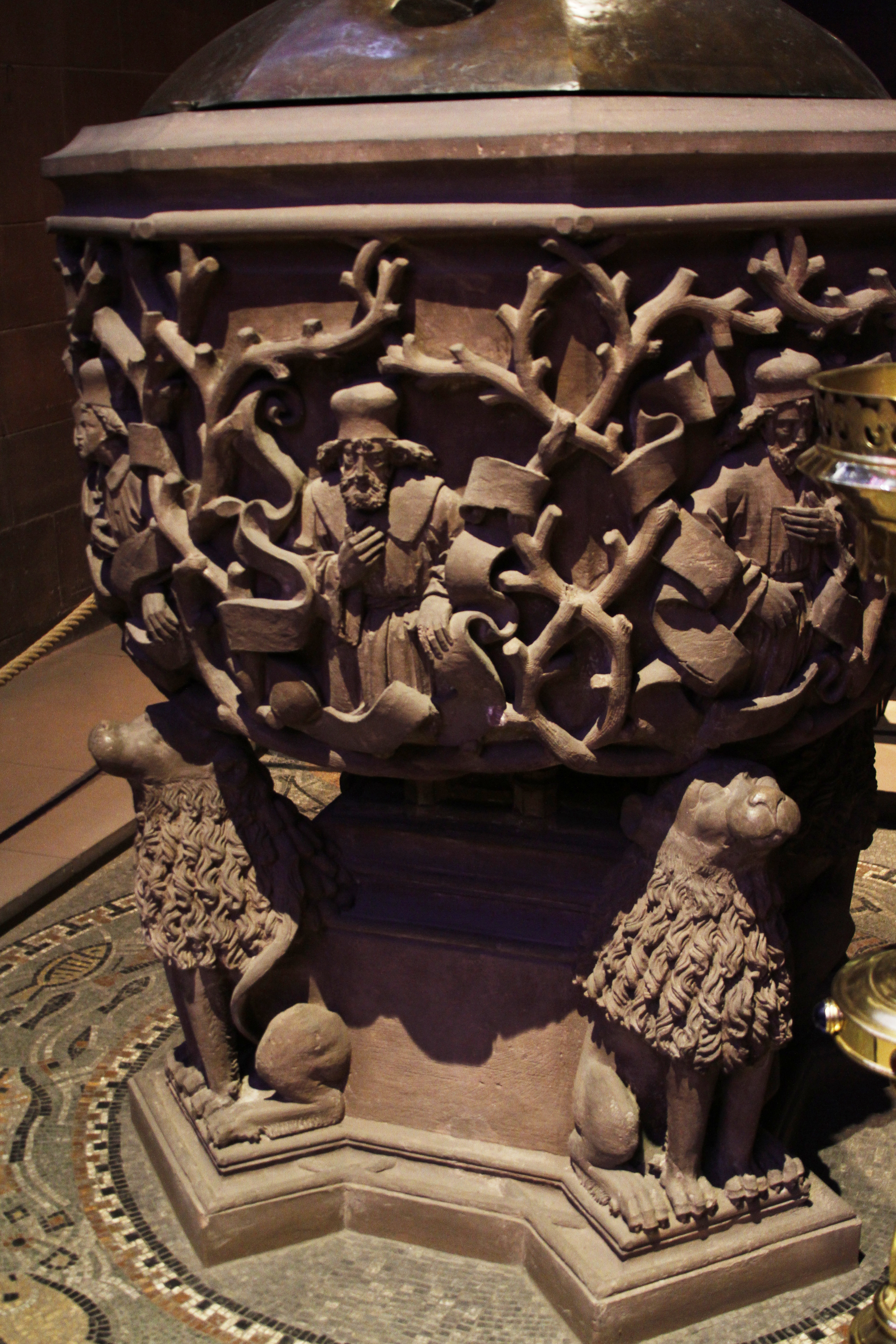
Stone font in the chapel of St Nicholas

In the course of the third period of construction, an early romanesque chapel in honour of St Nicholas of Myra was built, which was consecrated in 1058. Its consecration inscription and the tympanon of the former entrance to the cathedral, with one of the oldest known depictions of St Nicholas, are preserved. It was apparently used to store a relic of the Saint, which had been brought by Empress Theophanu from Byzantium, at the time of her marriage to Otto II in 972.

The current chapel of St Nicholas was built on the same location between 1280 and 1315 in the Gothic style, with two aisles, immediately west of the man portal on the south side aisle of the cathedral. At this time, when St Nicholas was still buried in Myra, his cult spread through the west and he was revered as patron of various groups and helper in many matters. This could explain the unusual size and sumptuousness of the chapel. The Jesuit and Bollandist, Daniel Papebroch (1628–1714) saw the original Worms relic of St Nicholas in 1660. He described it as a "finger bone" of the saint, which at that time was stored in the cathedral sacristry, but had previously been displayed in his own chapel. He states also that the Worms relic was always immersed in oil, just as the relic of St Nicholas in Bari is to this day. Papebroch also mentions a still-extant sumptuous consecration offering from Queen Constance of Sicily († 1198) to Saint Nicholas. The old relic o Nicholas was lost in the destruction during the Nine Years War. At the end of the twentieth century, a new one was acquired, which is kept once more in the chapel of Nicholas, in a modern reliquary.

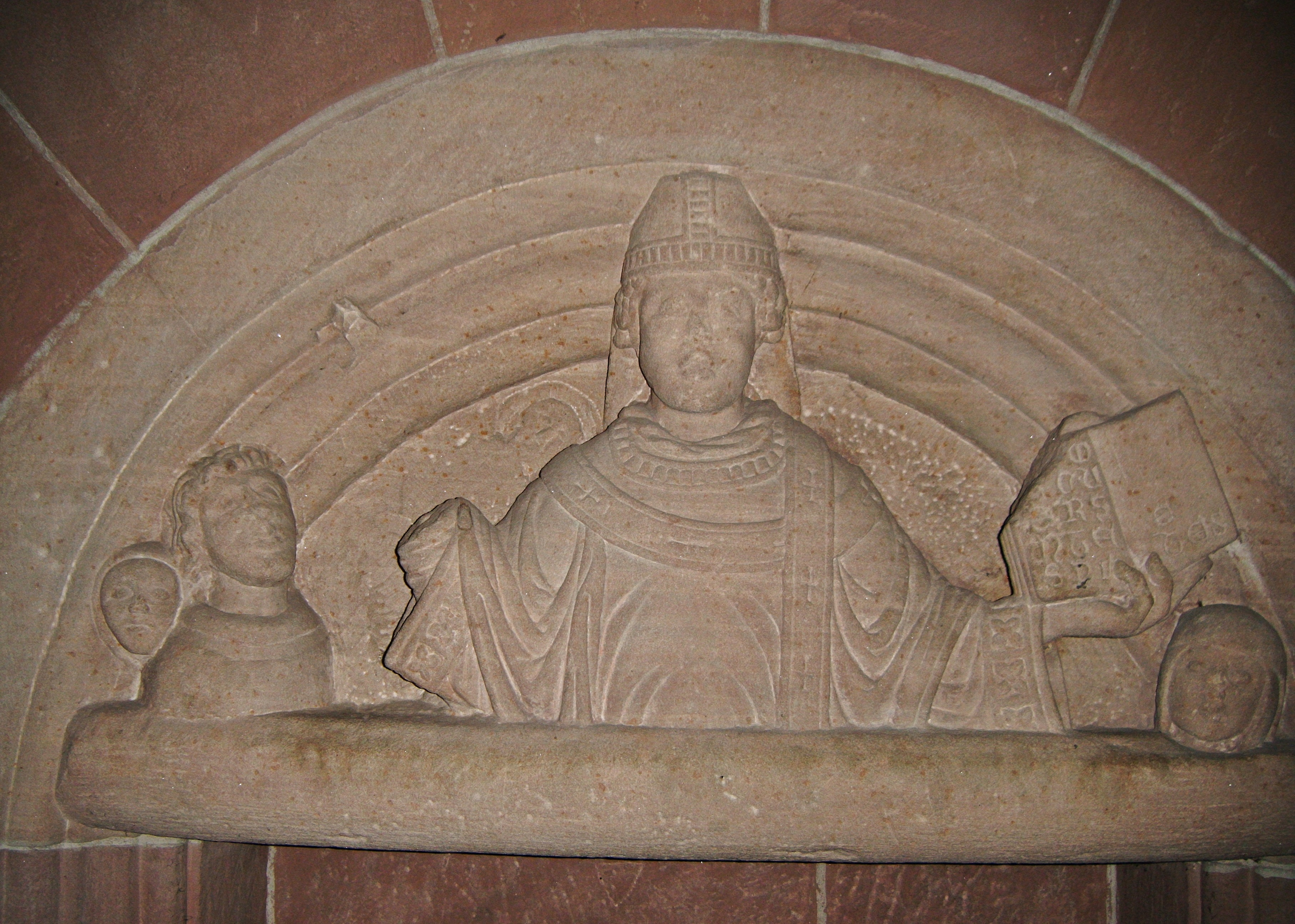
Romanesque tympanon of St Nicholas

The chapel was originally part of the cloisters which were located immediately to the west and was hidden by them for half its length. When the remains of the cloisters were finally cleared away in 1830, the structure of the chapel fell out of balance so that they finally had to completely dismantle it in 1920/27, like the west choir a few years earlier, install new foundations and rebuild it anew. On this same occasion, they also attempted to correct the proportions of the chapel which had become ungainly after the removal of the cloisters, by extending it to the west by a half vault. The current (southern) entranceway to the chapel derives from modern times, but its tympanon comes from the portal which formerly led from the cloisters into the chapel.

The furnishings of the chapel of St Nicholas consist today of pieces which were all originally intended for other contexts. The gothic carved altar comes from Southern Germany and was only acquired a few decades ago. The late Gothic Baptismal font was originally located in the Johanneskirche, which was demolished in the 19th century, the almost life size Gothic depiction of three young women was in a nearby abbey. The intense blue-red windows immerse the chapel in an almost mystic twilight. In the highly elevated roof of the chapel, the collection of architectural decorations and casts of them are housed, while the cellar houses the central heating of the cathedral. The chapel now serves as the baptismal chapel of the cathedral and is used for weekday services. Thus it has appropriated the functions of the old Johanneskirche.

=== High altar ===
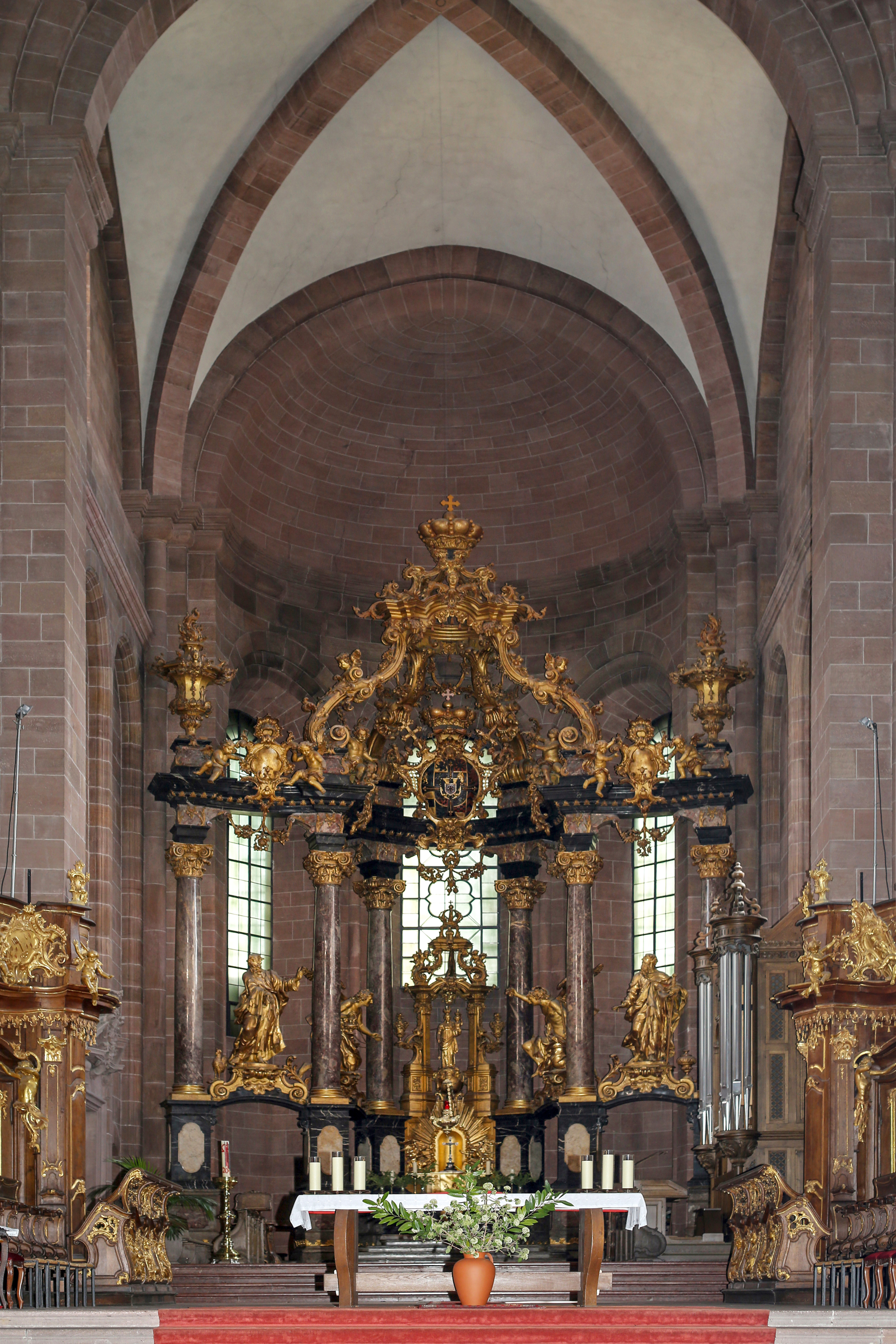
High altar of Johann Balthasar Neumann

Franz Ludwig of Pfalz-Neuburg, Prince-elector of Mainz and Prince-Bishop of Worms, left enough money in his will to have a new high altar built. His successor, Prince-Bishop Franz Georg of Schönborn, asked his brother Friedrich, the Bishop of Würzburg to provide the builder Johann Balthasar Neumann for the project. The latter produced the new high altar made of gilt wood and multicoloured marble.

== Organs ==
=== Main organ (Klais 1985) ===
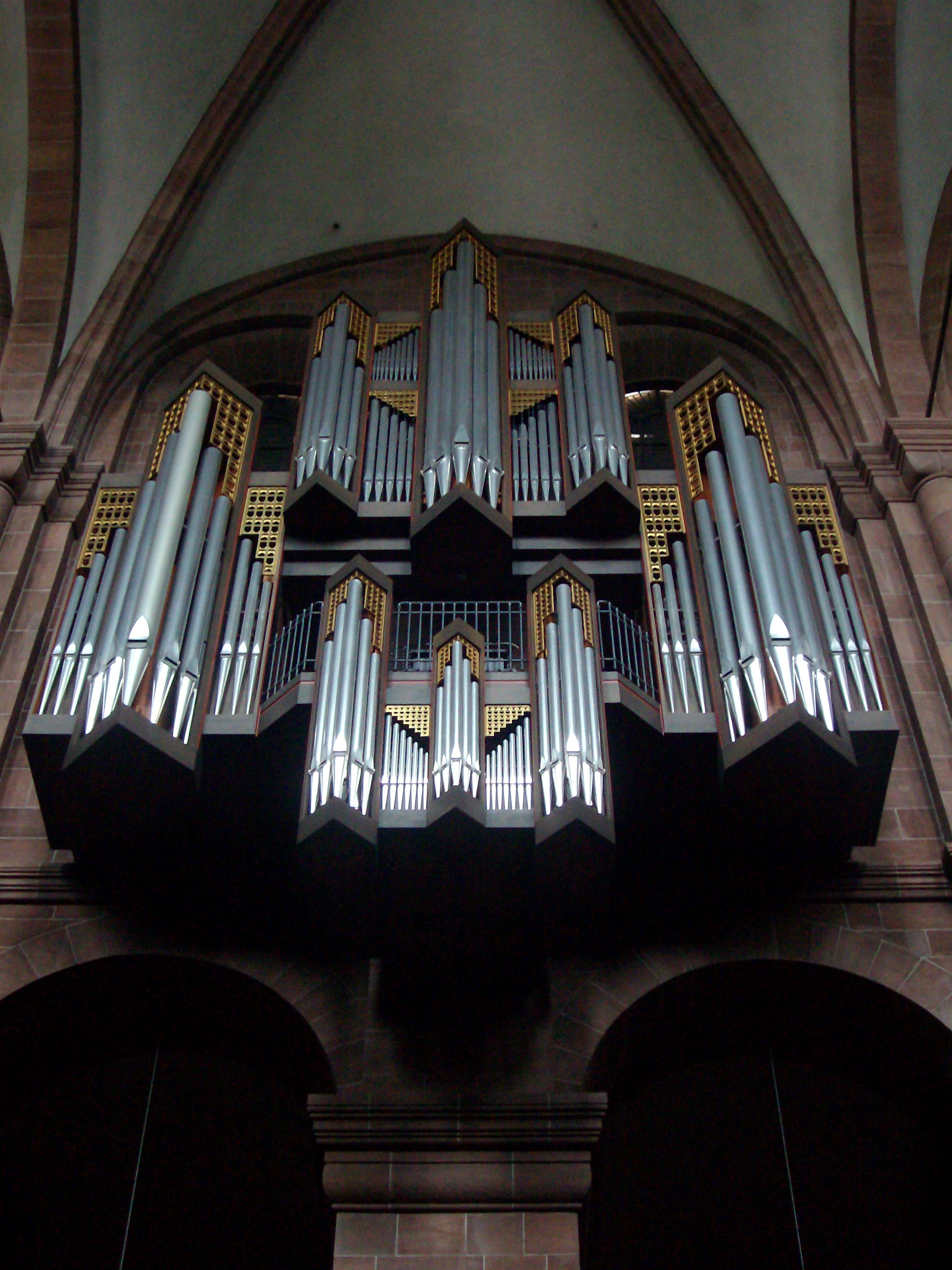
Swallow's nest organ by Klais

Klais Orgelbau built a swallow's nest organ with three manuals and 34 registers in 1985, which was slightly reorganised and re-toned in 2007. The machine has a mechanical playing action, the tracker action is electronic.

=== Choir organ (Oberlinger 1996) ===
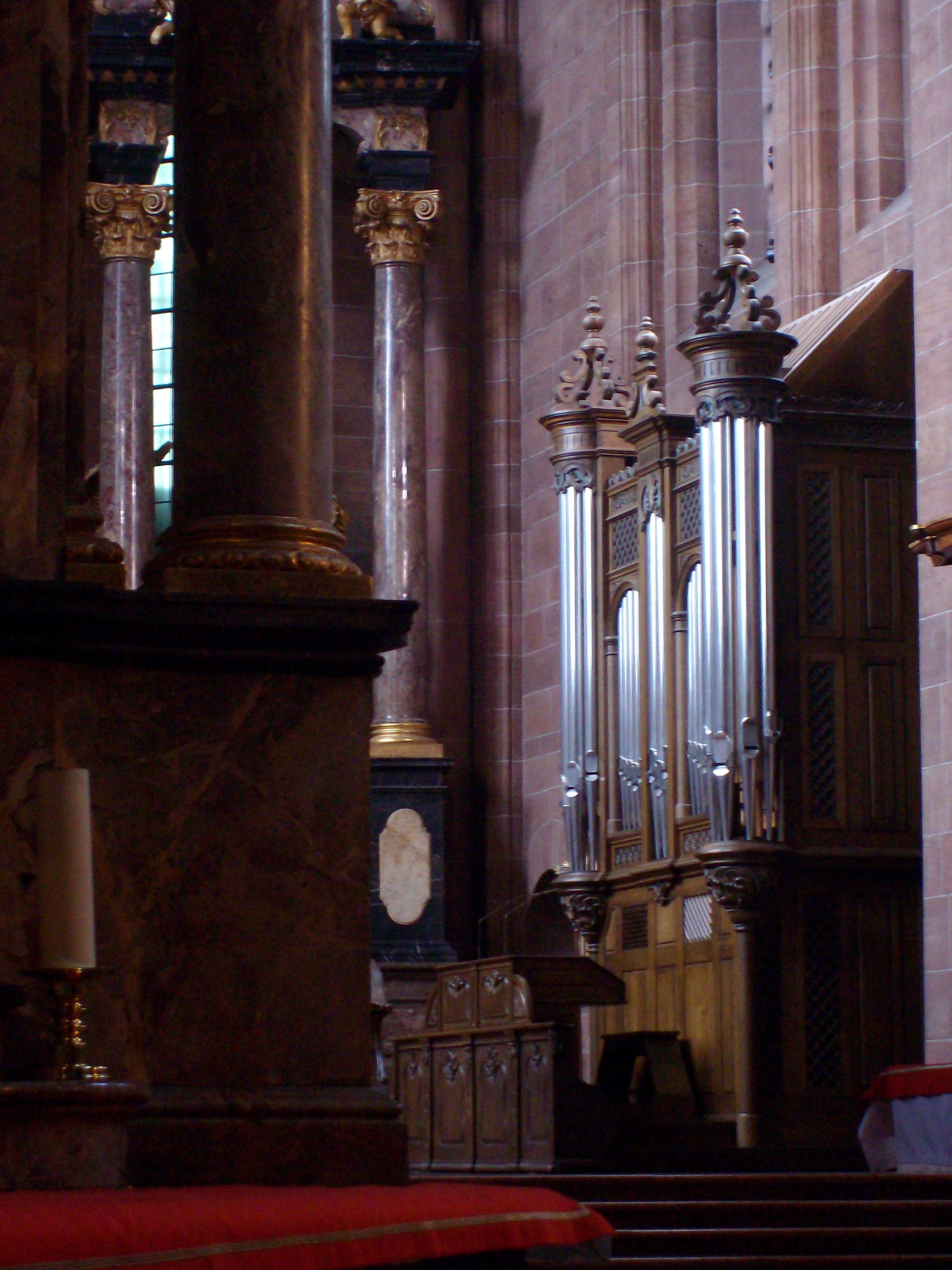
Choir organ by Oberlinger

In addition, there is also a choir organ with mechanical playing and tracker action in the style of the choir organs of Aristide Cavaillé-Coll, which was built in 1996 by Oberlinger. The special feature of this organ's design is that it is extremely compact for its disposition and at the same time, as a result of a pipe construction specially developed by Oberlinger it can be moved about 50 cm (20 in) away from the wall. This compact structure was necessary so that view of the sumptuous high altar from the nave wouldn't be obscured by the organ. A special construction of the air intake was required to achieve this small size. The design was accomplished by organ master and architect Wolfgang Oberlinger in close partnership with the diocese's architects and conservators. The organ was arranged by Oberlinger's Windesheim workshop in collaboration with the organist Daniel Roth. The instrument was intoned by Jean-Pierre Swiderski, a noted expert on the designs of Aristide Cavaillé-Coll.

== Bells ==
Before the destruction of Worms in 1689 during the Nine Years War, six bells hung in the four towers of the church. In 1728, the cathedral received a new six part ring. In the course of the Secularisation at the end of the 18th century, these bells were confiscated. When the cathedral became a parish church, four bells were hung in the southeast tower, with the notes B, E-flat, G-flat and A-flat. They were destroyed by aerial bombing at the end of the Second World War.

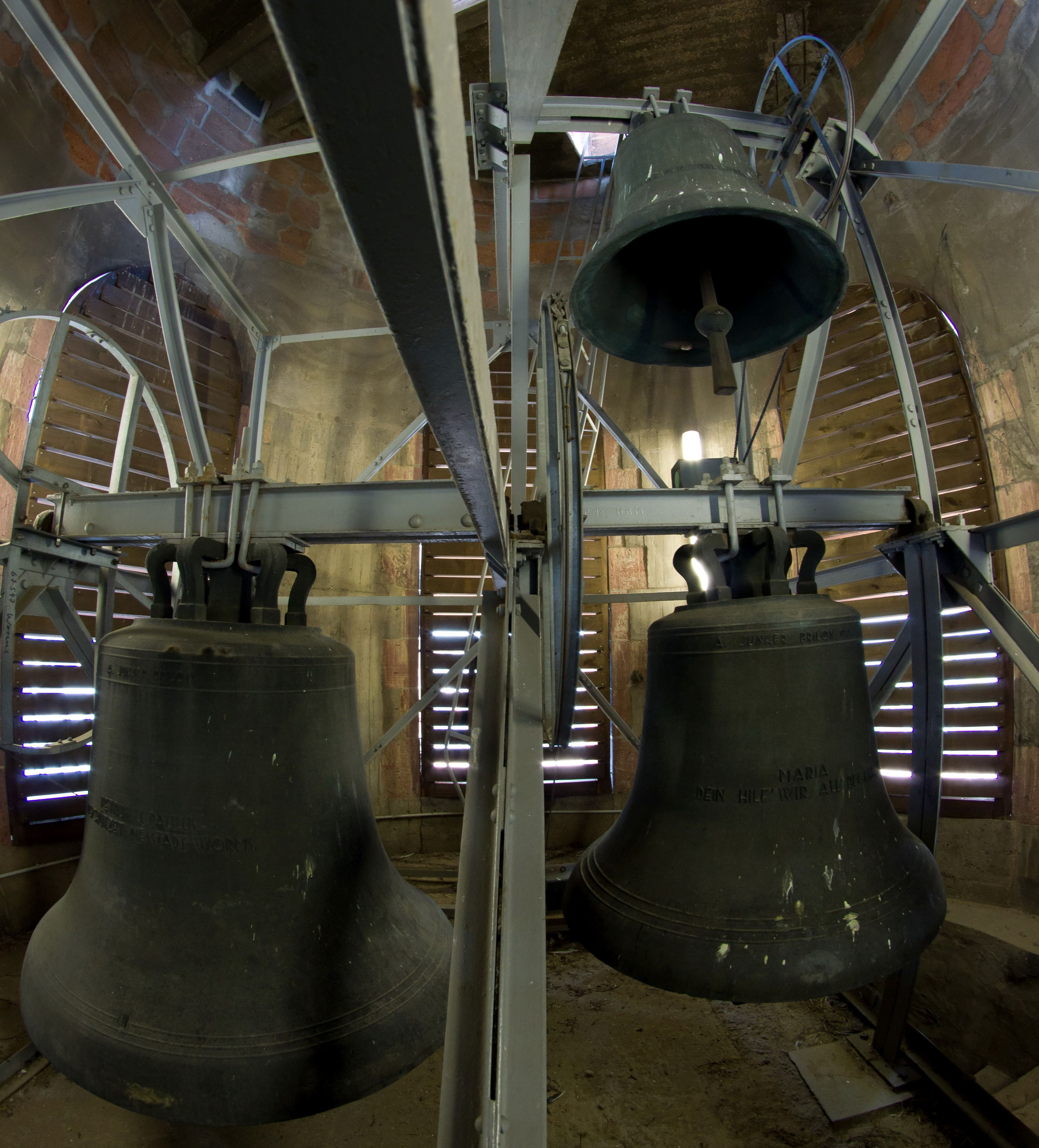
Bottom left Peter and Paul, bottom right Mary, upper right Brother Conrad. (Taken in 2015, before the installation of the new bells)

Three bells were cast in 1949 by Albert Junker of Brilon to replace the lost ring, with the notes C, E and G. They were made of a special metal called "Briloner Sonderbronze" (a tin-free copper-silicon alloy). These were named after Peter and Paul (the cathedral's patron saints), the Blessed Virgin Mary, and Saint Conrad of Parzham (known also as Brother Conrad). They were consecrated on Easter Sunday 1949 by the Bishop of Mainz, Albert Stohr, and were hung in the south-east tower.

To commemorate the 1000th anniversary of the cathedral's consecration in 2018, five new bells were added to the ring, and the old bells received new clappers. The additions consisted of three lighter bells (with the notes of D, A and B), one middle-weight bell (in the note of D) and a large bell in the note of B. The new bells were tuned to the notes of the other church bells in the city (including Holy Trinity Church and St. Magnus' Church) in order to create a larger 'City peal' when the bells of all three churches are rung together.

All bells were cast by the Rincker Bell Foundry, located in Sinn, Hesse. The names of the bells and their inscriptions were designed by local artist Klaus Krier, and the first official ringing of all eight bells, followed by ringing of the City peal, occurred on the Saturday before Pentecost, 19 May 2018.

No.	Name	Year	Founder	Weight (kg)	Diameter (mm)	Key and Nominal	Inscription (with English translation)	Tower
1	Amandus und Rupert	2018	Rincker, Sinn	2855	1649	B^{0} −4	Heiliger Amandus – Patron der Stadt Worms und Heiliger Rupert – Großer Missionar – Heilige Bischöfe von Worms – Bittet für die Kirche und ihre Hirten Saint Amandus – Patron of the City of Worms and Saint Rupert – The Great Missionary – Holy Bishop of Worms – Pray for the Church and her Ministers	North-East
2	Petrus und Paulus	1949	Junker, Brilon	2218	1580	C^{1} −4	Petrus und Paulus – beschützt die Stadt Worms Peter and Paul – Protect the City of Worms	South-East
3	Heinrich und Kunigunde	2018	Rincker, Sinn	1789	1405	D^{1} −2	Heiliger Heinrich und Heilige Kunigunde – Herrscher des römischen Reiches und Freunde Bischof Burchards – Betet für die, die uns regieren – um Frieden zwischen den Völkern St. Henry and St. Kunigunde – Ruler of the (Holy) Roman Empire and Friends of Bishop Burchard – Pray for them that govern us – for peace among the people	North-East
4	Maria	1949	Junker, Brilon	1114	1260	E^{1} −2	Maria – Dein Hilf wir all begehren. Mary – For thy help, we pray.	South-East
5	Bruder Konrad	1949	Junker, Brilon	653	1060	G^{1} −1	Hl. Bruder Konrad – bitte für uns. Gestiftet von Karl Kübel und Ehefrau. St. Brother Conrad – Pray for us. Donated by Karl Kübel and his wife.	South-East
6	Petrus Faber SJ	2018	Rincker, Sinn	556	947	A^{1} −1	Heiliger Petrus Faber SJ – Kämpfer für Versöhnung und Ökumene – „Dass alle eins seien“ – Um die Einheit der Kirche Saint Peter Faber SJ – Fight for Reconciliation and Ecumenism – "That all may be one" – For the Unity of the Church	South-East
7	Heribert	2018	Rincker, Sinn	473	880	B^{1} −1	Heiliger Heribert – Bischof – Kanzler – Freund der Armen – Dass wir die Armen und Schwachen nicht vergessen – Bitte für uns Saint Heribert – Bishop – Chancellor – Friend of the Poor – That we may not forget the poor and the weak – Pray for us	North-East
8	Hanno von Worms	2018	Rincker, Sinn	297	751	D^{2} +1	Heiliger Hanno von Worms – Frommer Ordensmann und weiser Bischof – Bitte für unsere Kranken und die Sterbenden Saint Hanno of Worms – Pious, Religious and wise Bishop – Pray for our Sick and the Dying	North-East

== In the Nibelungen Saga ==
An episode in the Nibelungenlied takes place at the portal of the cathedral. The rival queens Brünhilde and Kriemhild disputed over which of their husbands (Siegfried or Gunther) has the higher rank, and therefore, which of them should enter the cathedral first. This is a key episode which leads to Siegfried's death and the destruction of the Nibelungs.

The portal in question was on the north side of the cathedral and was considerably more elaborate before it was destroyed in 1689.

In connection with this episode, the Nibelungenfestspiele have taken place on an outdoor stage in front of the cathedral since 2002.

== See also ==
- The New Synagogue of Strasbourg, built by Ludwig Levy from 1895 to 1898 and destroyed in 1940–41, was modelled on Worms Cathedral.
- Mainz Cathedral
- High medieval domes
