= Georg Friedrich von Greiffenklau =

Prince-Bishop of Worms and Archbishop of Mainz

- Archbishop-Elector of Mainz
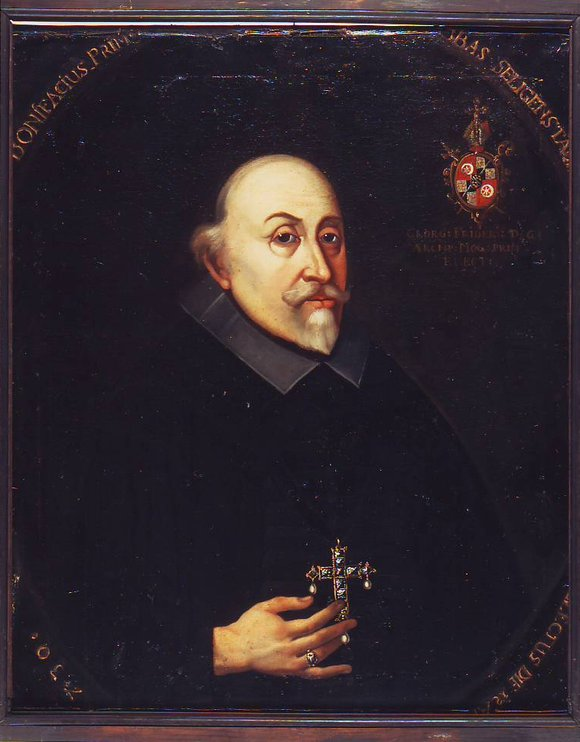
- Church: Catholic Church
- Archdiocese: Mainz
- In office: 1626–1629
- Predecessor: Johann Schweikhard von Kronberg
- Successor: Anselm Casimir Wambold von Umstadt

Personal details
- Born: 8 September 1573
- Died: 6 July 1629 (aged 55)

Georg Friedrich von Greiffenklau zu Vollrads (also spelled Greiffenclau; 8 September 1573 – 6 July 1629) was a German theologian who served as Prince-Bishop of Worms from 1616 and as Archbishop and Elector of Mainz from 1626 until his death in 1629.

== Biography ==
Georg Friedrich von Greiffenklau zu Vollrads was born in Schloss Vollrads on 8 September 1573. He was educated at the Collegium Germanicum in Rome. He then worked as an official in the Archbishopric of Mainz.

In 1616, the cathedral chapter of Worms Cathedral elected him to be Bishop of Worms. The cathedral chapter of Mainz Cathedral elected him to also be Archbishop of Mainz in 1626. As Archchancellor of the Holy Roman Empire, Georg Friedrich authored the Edict of Restitution in 1627.

He died in Mainz on 6 July 1629.

Catholic Church titles
Preceded by Wilhelm von Essern	Prince-Bishop of Worms; 1616–1629	Succeeded by Georg Anton von Rodenstein
Preceded by Johann Schweikhard von Kronberg	Archbishop-Elector of Mainz; 1626–1629	Succeeded by Anselm Casimir Wambold von Umstadt
