= Prince-Bishopric of Worms =

Ecclesiastical principality of the Holy Roman Empire

Prince-Bishopric of Worms Episcopatus Vormatiensis (Latin) Fürstbistum Worms (German)
- 861–1802
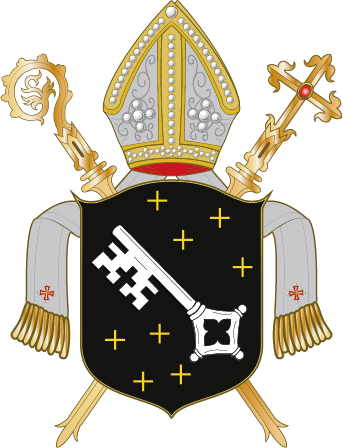
- Coat of arms

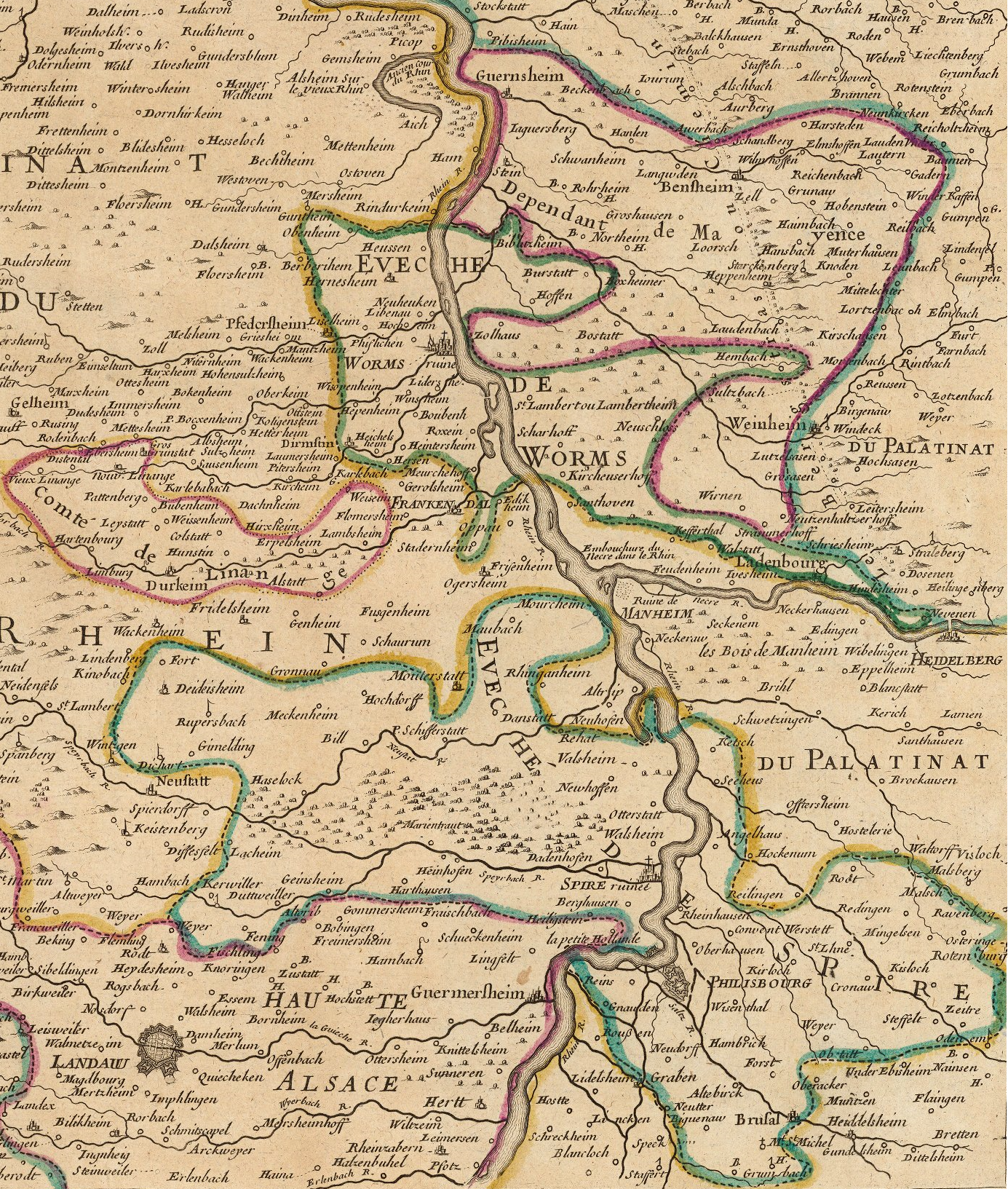
- The Prince-Bishopric of Worms circa 1700
- Status: Prince-Bishopric
- Capital: Worms until 1400; thereafter Ladenburg
- Common languages: Ripuarian Franconian
- Government: Ecclesiastical principality
- Historical era: Middle Ages
  - Bishopric founded: 614
  - Gained Reichsfreiheit: 861
  - Occupied by France: 1795
  - Secularised to Hesse-Darmstadt: 1802
Preceded by	Succeeded by
Electoral Palatinate	Landgraviate of Hesse-Darmstadt

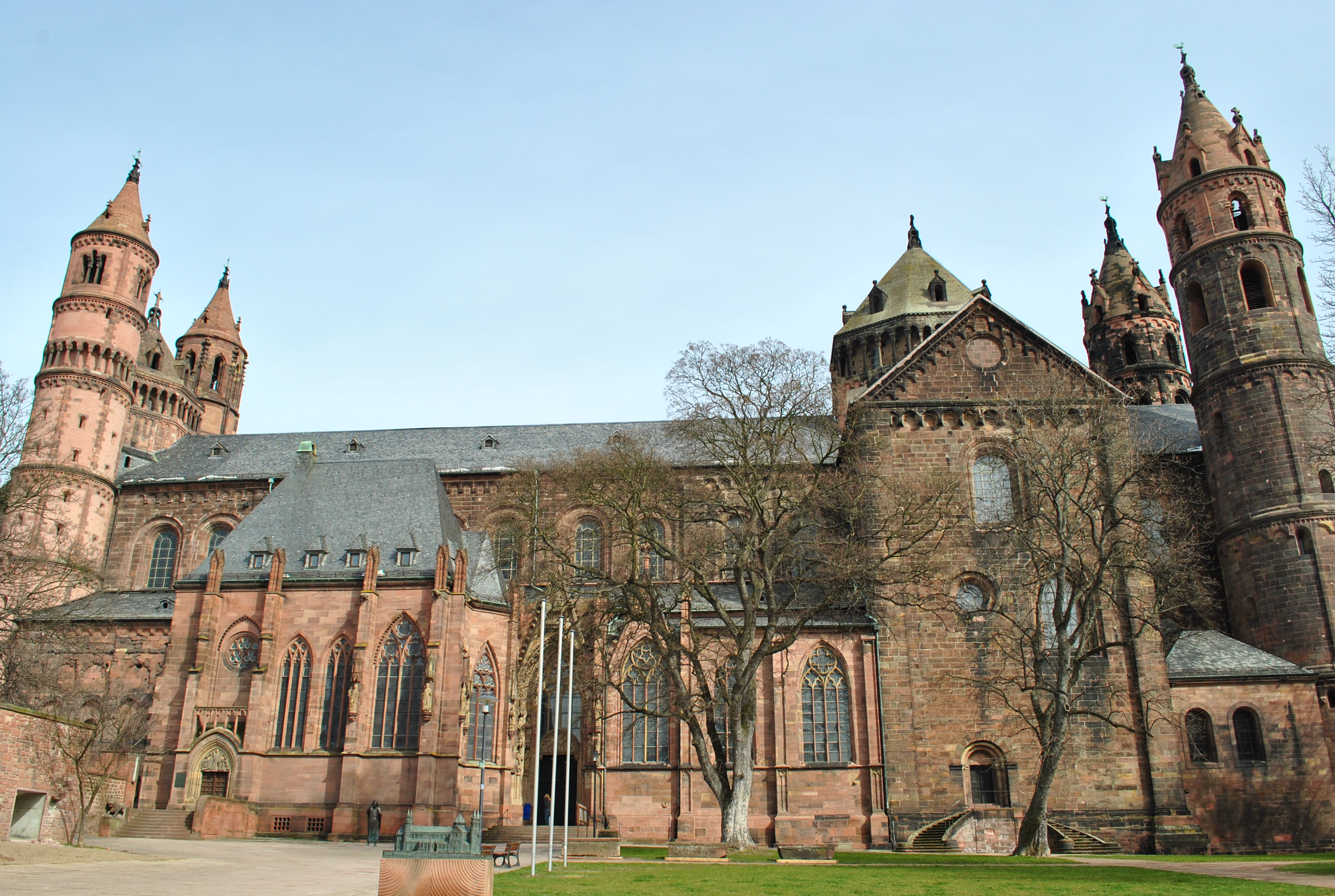
The Imperial Cathedral of Worms

The Prince-Bishopric of Worms was an ecclesiastical principality of the Holy Roman Empire. Located on both banks of the Rhine around Worms just north of the union of that river with the Neckar, it was largely surrounded by the Electorate of the Palatinate. Worms had been the seat of a bishop from Roman times. From the High Middle Ages on, the prince-bishops' secular jurisdiction no longer included the city of Worms, which was an Imperial Free City (the Free Imperial City of Worms) and which became officially Protestant during the Reformation. The prince-bishops however retained jurisdiction over the Cathedral of Worms inside the city.

During the Worms massacre in 1096, Bishop Adalbert II attempted to protect the city’s Jewish community by sheltering them in his palace, but his attempt to protect them were ultimately unsuccessful.

In 1795 Worms itself, as well as the entire territory of the prince-bishopric on the left bank of the Rhine, was occupied and annexed by France. In the wake of the territorial reorganizations that came with the German mediatization of 1802, the remaining territory of the bishopric, along with that of nearly all the other ecclesiastical principalities, was secularized. In this case, it was annexed by Hesse-Darmstadt.

== Bishops of Worms, 770—1802 ==
- Erembert 770-803
- Bernhar 803-823
- Volkwin 823-841
- Samuel 841-859
- Gunzo 859-872
- Adelhelm 873-890
- Dietlach 890-914
- Richowo 914-950
- Hanno 950-978
- Hildebold 978-998
- Franco from Hesse 998-999
- Erfo 999
- Razo 999
- Burchard I 1000-1025
- Azecho 1025-1044
- Adalgar 1044
- Arnold I 1044-1065
- Adalbert I von Rheinfelden 1065-1070
- Adalbert II 1070-1107
- Erzo 1107-115
- Arnold II 1110-1131
- Burchard II von Asorn 1120-1149
- Konrad I von Steinach 1150-1171
- Konrad II von Sternberg 1171-1192
- Henryk I van Maastricht 1192-1195
- Luitpold von Schonfeld 1196-1217
- Henry II of Saarbrücken 1217-1234
- Landolf of Hoheneck 1234-1247
- Konrad III von Durkheim 1247
- Richard of Dhaun 1247-1257
- Eberhard I of Baumberg 1257-1277
- Friedrich of Baumberg 1277-1283
- Simon von Schoneck 1283-1291
- Eberhard II von Strahlenberg 1291-1293
- Emicho of Baumberg 1294-1299
- Eberwin von Kronenberg 1300-1308
- sede vacante 1309–1310
  - Baldwin of Luxembourg 1309–1310, as diocesan administrator
- Emeric von Schoneck 1310-1318
- Heinrich III of Dhaun 1318-1319
- Konrad IV von Schoneck 1319-1329
- Gerlach von Erbach 1329-1332
- Salomon Waldbott, 1332–1350
- Dietrich I Bayer von Boppard 1350-1365
- Johann Schadland 1365-1370
- Echard von Dersch 1370-1405
- Matthew of Kraków 1405-1410
- Johann II von Fleckenstein 1410-1426
- Eberhard III von Sternberg 1426-1427
- Friedrich II von Domneck 1427-1445
- Ludwig von Ast 1445
- Reinhard I von Sickingen 1445-1482
- Johann von Dalberg 1482-1503
- Reinhard von Rüppurr 1503-1523
- Henry of the Palatinate 1523-1552
- Dietrich von Rothenstein 1552-1580
- Georg von Schönenberg 1580-1595
- Philipp von Rothenstein 1595-1604
- Philipp II. Kratz von Scharfenstein 1604
- Wilhelm von Essern 1604-1616
- Georg Friedrich von Greiffenklau 1616-1629
- Georg Anton von Rodenstein 1629-1652
- Hugo Eberhard Kratz von Scharfenstein 1654-1663
- Johann Philipp von Schönborn 1663-1673
- Lothar Friedrich von Metternich-Burscheid 1673-1675
- Damian Hartard von der Leyen-Hohengeroldseck 1675-1678
- Karl Heinrich von Metternich-Winneburg 1679
- Franz Emmerich Kaspar von Waldbott von Bassenheim 1679-1683
- Johannes Karl von und zu Franckenstein 1683-1691
- Ludwig Anton von Pfalz-Neuburg 1691-1694
- Count Palatine Francis Louis of Neuburg 1694-1732
- Franz Georg von Schönborn 1732-1756
- Johann Friedrich Karl von Ostein 1756-1763
- Johann Philipp II von Walderdorf 1763-1768
- Emmerich Joseph von Breidbach zu Bürresheim 1768-1774
- Friedrich Karl Josef von Erthal 1774-1802
