= Burchard of Worms =

Bishop (c. 950/965 – 1025)

The Right Reverend Burchard of Worms
- Bishop of Worms
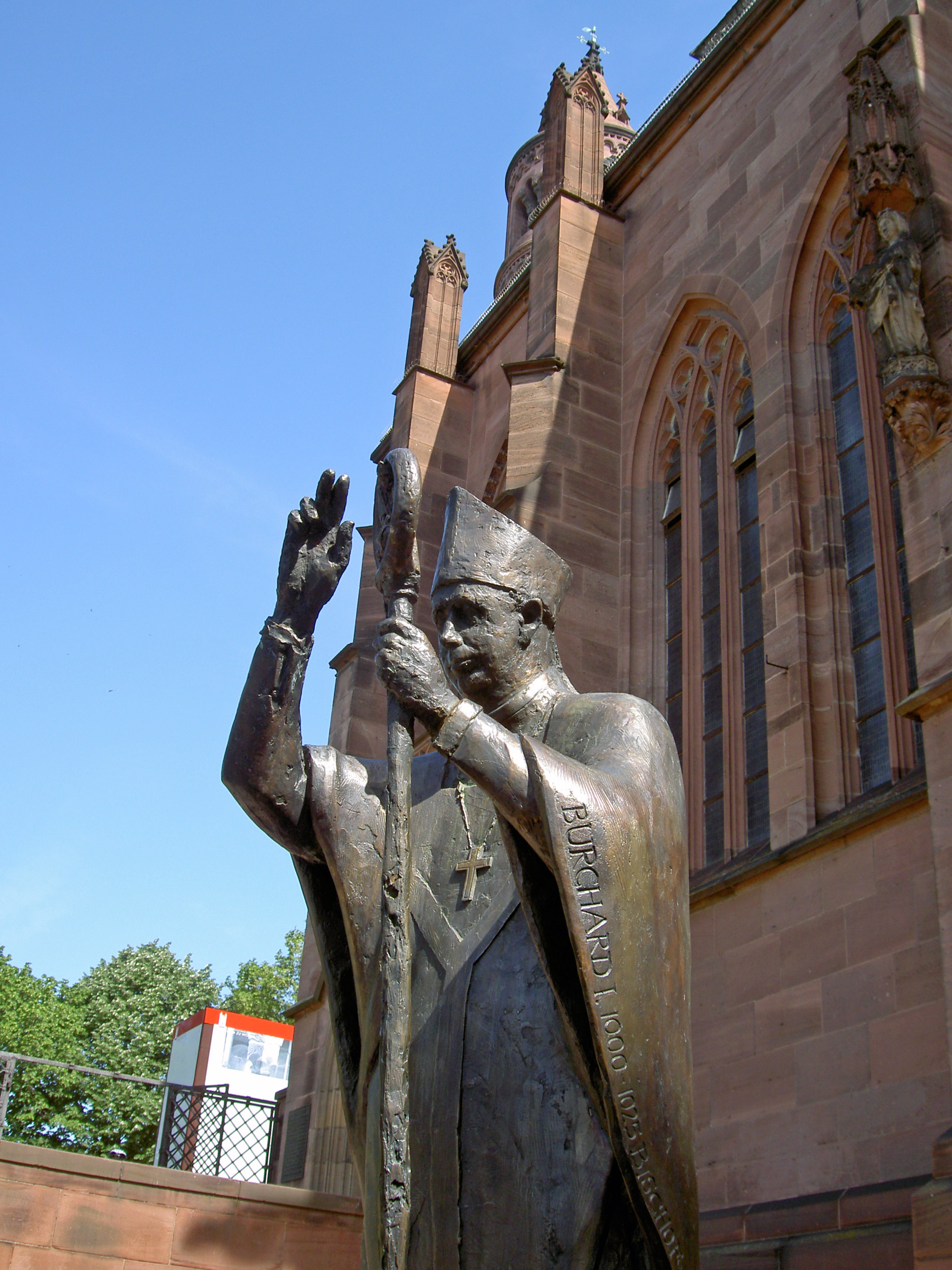
- Statue of Burchard at Worms Cathedral
- Church: Catholic Church
- Diocese: Diocese of Worms
- Appointed: 1000 A.D.
- Term ended: 20 August 1025
- Predecessor: Franco of Worms (brother)
- Successor: Azecho of Worms

Orders
- Consecration: 1000 A.D. by Archbishop Willigis of Mainz
- Rank: Bishop

Personal details
- Born: c.965 Hesse, Holy Roman Empire (now Germany)
- Died: 20 August 1025 (aged 59–60) Worms, Holy Roman Empire
- Denomination: Roman Catholic
- Occupation: Bishop, canonist, theologian

Burchard of Worms (c. 950/965 – 20 August 1025) was the bishop of the Imperial City of Worms, in the Holy Roman Empire. He was the author of a canon law collection of twenty books known as the Decretum, Decretum Burchardi, or Decretorum libri viginti.

== Early life ==
Burchard was born on c. 950–965 to a well-connected, wealthy family in the northern Hesse region of the Holy Roman Empire. He had two siblings: an older brother, Franco, who served as the Bishop of Worms from c. 998–999, and a sister, Mathilda, who became the abbess of an unknown monastery near Worms in c. 1010–1015. It is evident from the Vita Burchardi, written by Ebbo/Eberhard of Worms in c. 1025, that during the early life of Burchard his parents not only possessed "many properties and servants", but had local influence sufficient to directly position two of their sons to becoming confidants of the inner Imperial circle and Bishops of Worms. Burchard's family seems to have been of sufficient substance to exert a reasonable measure of political influence within the Diocese of Worms. As a young boy he was sent to the town of Koblenz where he entered the monastic school of either St. Florin or St. Kastor to be raised as a canon. Under the tutelage of Archbishop Willigis of Mainz, Burchard was diligently instructed in "noble behaviour" while swiftly being groomed "through each step of the clerical grade" until he became the provost of a "very poor place", i. e. the old collegiate church of St. Victor in Mainz. There, Burchard transformed its fortune by founding an "outstanding monastery along with a cloister of canons" which Willigis funded and eventually consecrated in c. 994–995. He was later ordained as a Catholic deacon by Willigis and eventually elevated as Primate of Mainz.

== Episcopacy ==
Upon the death of Burchard's brother Franco in 999, Emperor Otto III appointed Burchard as Bishop of Worms in 1000. Willigis confirmed his elevation within days at Kirchberg in Saxony. The Vita Burchardi relates that the Emperor initially intended to elevate one of his two chaplains, Herpo of Halberstadt or Rako of Bremen, to this diocese, going so far as to give his intended appointee "the pastoral staff as [he] lay in bed gravely ill." However, both of them died before either could be so ordained. The Emperor had also offered the diocese of Worms to a renowned pastor named Erpho. Within three days of becoming bishop, Erpho died from unknown causes and a certain Razo was quickly appointed to fill the resulting vacancy, who killed himself at Chur, Switzerland, shortly thereafter. The same narrative indicates that Worms was in disrepair, urgently needing an administrator after regular attacks from robbers and wolves.

After he was appointed as Bishop of Worms, Burchard led the rebuilding of the walls of the city, the institution of many monasteries and churches, and the destruction of the fortifications of Otto I, Duke of Carinthia. Duke Otto was believed to house criminals and he was an enemy of Burchard. According to Burchard's biographer, "many limbs were hacked off and many murders occurred on both sides" of the conflict between them. Burchard adopted a child from the enemy household, who grew to become Holy Roman Emperor Conrad II (c. 990–1034). After gaining the aid of Emperor Henry II and negotiating on the basis of documents created by Burchard's predecessor Bishop Hildebald, the castle of Duke Otto was dismantled and rebuilt as a monastery dedicated in honour of Paul of Tarsus. In 1016, Burchard rebuilt the Cathedral of St. Peter in Worms. He also educated students in the attached cathedral school.

=== Death ===
Burchard died in 1025, leaving his sister a hair shirt and an iron chain as a memento mori.

== Works ==
=== Decretum ===
Burchard is most renowned as the compiler of a collection of 20 books of canon law in collaboration with his contemporaries, Bishop Walter of Speyer (963–1027), Alpert of Metz (d. 1024), and at least 3 other prominent regional Catholic clergy. Beginning in c. 1012, he worked through his material for approximately 9 years to complete the compilation, while living in a small structure atop a hill in the forest outside Worms, after his defeat of Duke Otto, while raising the latter's orphaned grandson, Conrad. The compilation, which he titled the Decretorum Libri Viginti or simply Decretum, became a very influential and popular source of canonical material. It came to be named the Brocardus (his name in Latin), from which the later legal word "brocard" originated (some researchers disagree with this etymology, pointing to contemporary spelling as Burkhardus). The Decretum cites a variety of biblical, patristic, and early medieval works, including the Old Testament, Augustine of Hippo, Gregory the Great, Isidore of Seville, Hrabanus Maurus, and Julian of Toledo. Burchard probably completed the Decretum no later than 1023.

The Decretum was much copied in the eleventh and twelfth centuries, with over 77 complete manuscripts still surviving. The earliest manuscripts, made in Worms before 1023 under Burchard's own supervision, are Vatican Pal. lat. 585 and 586 (once a single book), and Frankfurt Stadt- und Universitatsbibliothek Barth. 50.

The 20 books of the Decretum are:

1. De primatu ecclesiae ("On the Primacy of the Church")
2. De sacris ordinibus ("On Holy Orders")
3. De aeclesiis ("On Congregations")
4. De baptismo ("On Baptism")
5. De eucharistia ("On the Eucharist")
6. De homicidiis ("On Homicides")
7. De consanguinitate ("On Consanguinity")
8. De viris et feminis Deo dicatis ("On Men and Women Dedicated to God")
9. De virginibus et viduis non velatis ("On Virgins and Widows Who Are Not Veiled")
10. De incantatoribus et auguribus ("On Enchanters and Augurs"; see also Canon Episcopi)
11. De excommunicandis ("On Those To Be Excommunicated")
12. De periurio ("On Perjury")
13. De ieiunio ("On Fasting")
14. De crapula et ebrietate ("On Over-Eating and Inebriety")
15. De laicis ("On Laity")
16. De accusatoribus ("On Accusers")
17. De fornicatione ("On Fornication")
18. De visitatione infirmorum ("On the Visitation of the Infirm")
19. De paenitentia ("On Penitence" or "Corrector Burchardi"(see below))
20. De speculationum liber ("Book on Speculations")

Book 19 is sometimes titled the "Corrector Burchardi", being a penitential or confessor's guide. It is probably a work of the tenth century that Burchard added to the Decretum as a kind of appendix. Book 20, Speculationum Liber, expounds answers to technical theological questions, especially questions of eschatology, hamartiology, soteriology, demonology, angelology, anthropology, and cosmology.

As a source of canon law, the Decretum was supplanted by the Panormia (c. 1094–95) of Ivo of Chartres, which used and augmented large sections of the Decretum, and, a little later, by the Concordia Discordantium Canonum (1139–40) of Gratian (Decretum Gratiani), which was a much larger compilation that attempted to further reconcile contradictory canons.

=== Lex Familiae ===
From 1023 to 1025 Burchard promulgated the Leges et Statuta Familiae S. Petri Wormatiensis, also denominated the Lex Familiae Wormatiensis Ecclesiae, a compilation of customary laws that were instituted for the members of the familia of Worms, this being various free and non-free laborers of the episcopal estate in Worms. In a similar fashion, though considerably more condensed than the Decretum, the Lex delineated in 31 chapters a variety of the common, secular problems of the people of Worms during the final years of his episcopacy, including marriage, abduction, murder, theft, and perjury.

== Translations ==
- (Pt-Br) Bragança Júnior, Álvaro & Birro, Renan M. (2016). O Corrector sive Medicus (ou Corrector Burchardi, ou Da poenitentia, c. 1000–1025) por Burcardo de Worms (c. 965–1025): apresentação e tradução latim-português dos capítulos 1–4, além das "instruções" de penitência 001 a 095, Revista Signum 17 (1), pp. 266–309.
- (Fr) Gagnon, François (2010). Le Corrector sive Medicus de Burchard de Worms (1000–1025): présentation, traduction et commentaire ethno-historique. Dissertação. Montréal: Université de Montréal, 2010.
- (En) Shiners, John (2009). Burchard of Worms's Corrector and Doctor (c. 1008–12) In: Shiners, John (ed.). Medieval Popular Religion, 1000–1500: A reader. 2. ed. Toronto: University of Toronto Press, pp. 459–470.
- (It) Picasso, Giorgio; Piana, Giannino; Motta, Giuseppe (1998). A pane e acqua: peccati e penitenze nel Medioevo – Il «Penitenziale» di Bucardo di Worms. Novara: Europia.
- (En) McNeill, John & Garner, Helena (1965). Medieval Handbooks of Penance. New York: Octagon Books, pp. 321–345.
