= Philipp II. Kratz von Scharfenstein =

German Prince-Bishop

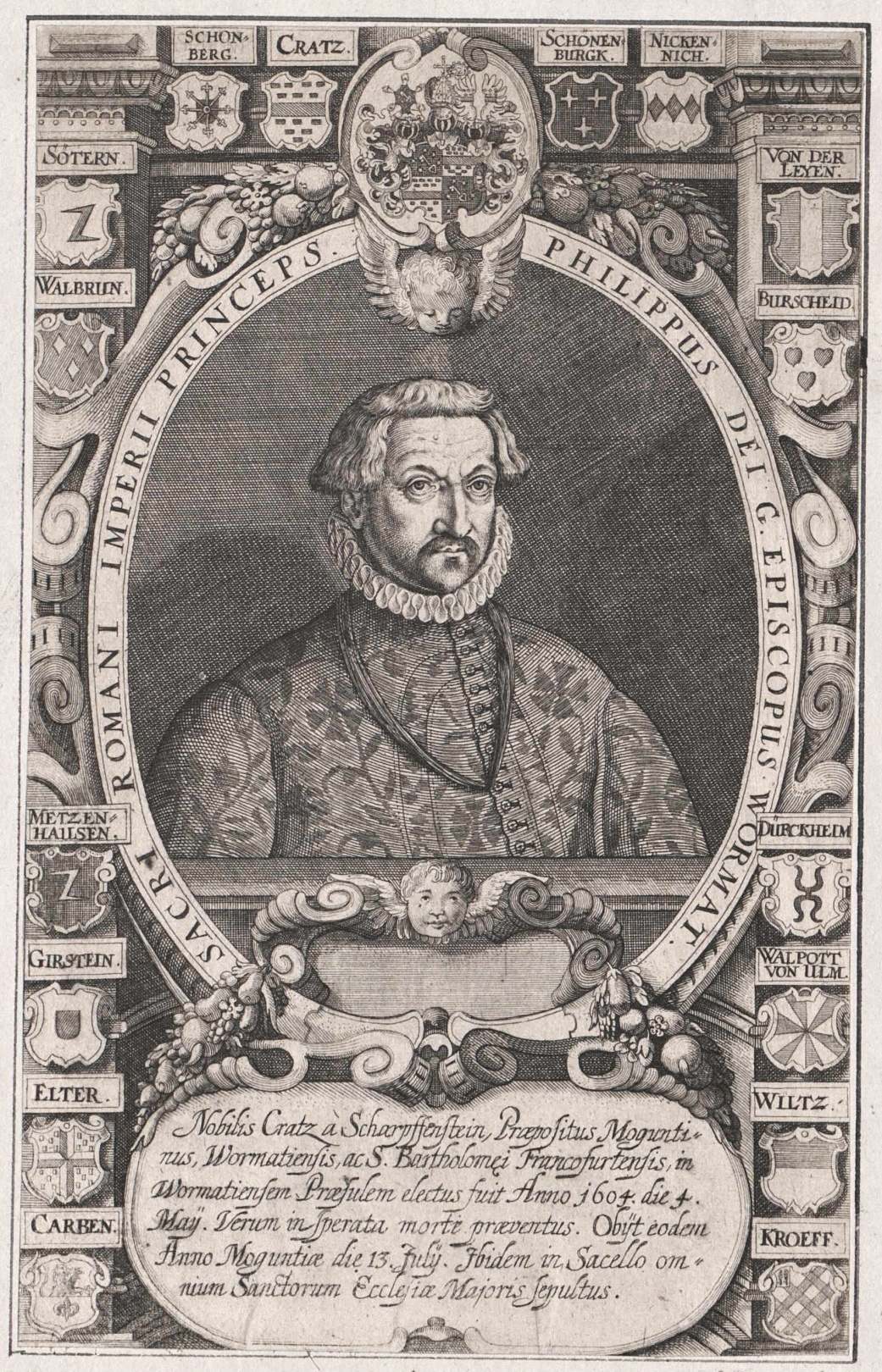
Portrait of Philipp II. Kratz von Scharfenstein

Philipp von Rothenstein (d. 1604) was briefly the Prince-Bishop of Worms in 1604.

== Bibliography ==
- Georg Helwich:„Wormatiensis Chronici“, Mainz, 1614
- Friedhelm Jürgensmeier: „Das Bistum Worms von der Römerzeit bis zur Auflösung 1801“, pages 187 - 189, Echter Verlag, Würzburg, 1997, ISBN 3-429-01876-5
- Christian von Stramberg and Anton Joseph Weidenbach: „Denkwürdiger und Nützlicher rheinischer Antiquarius“, Koblenz, 1863

== Notes ==
Catholic Church titles
Preceded by Philipp von Rothenstein	Prince-Bishop of Worms; 1604	Succeeded by Wilhelm von Essern
