= Anselm Casimir Wambold von Umstadt =

Archbishop-Elector of Mainz

- Archbishop-Elector of Mainz
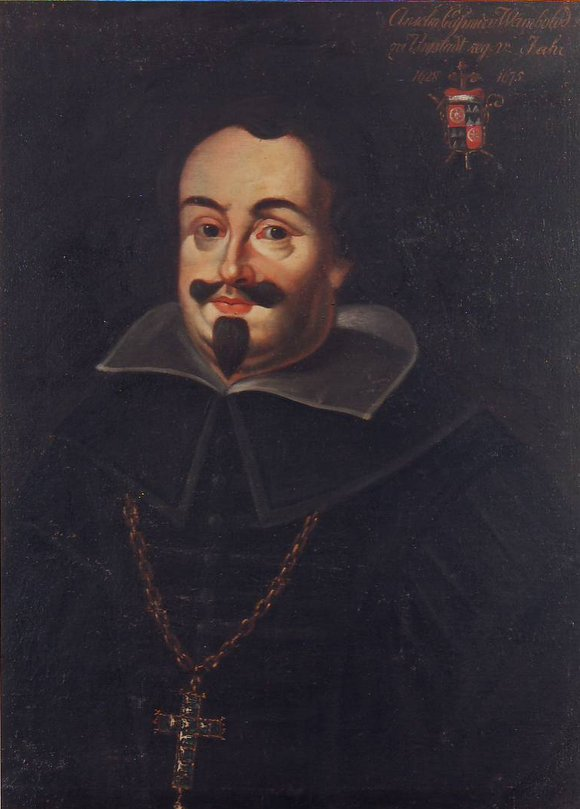
- Church: Catholic Church
- Archdiocese: Mainz
- In office: 1629–1647
- Predecessor: Georg Friedrich von Greiffenklau
- Successor: Johann Philipp von Schönborn

Personal details
- Born: 30 November 1582
- Died: 9 October 1647 (aged 64)

Anselm Casimir Wambold von Umstadt (30 November 1582 – 9 October 1647) was a German theologian who served as Archbishop and Elector of Mainz from 1629 until his death in 1647.

== Biography ==
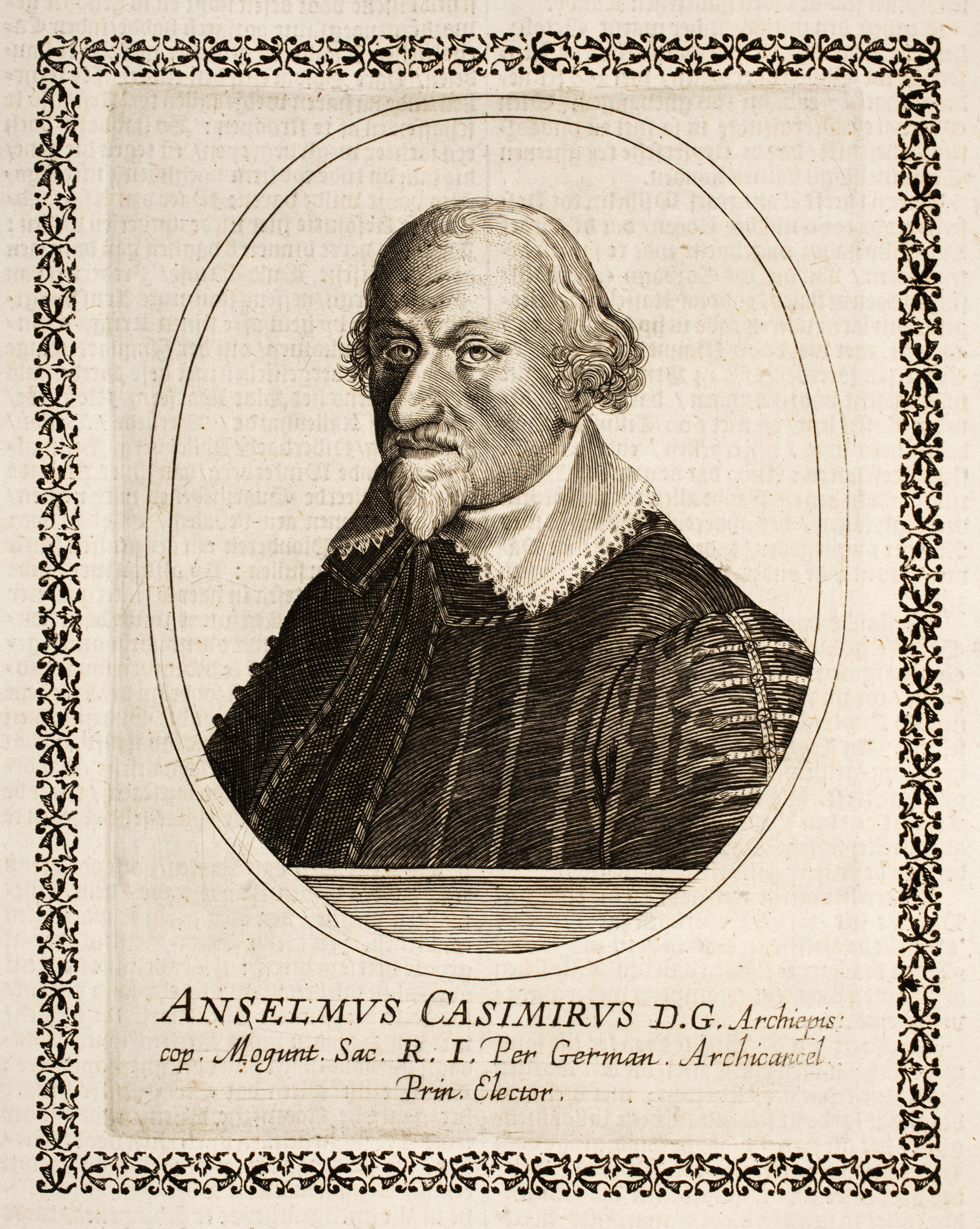
Anselm Casimir

Anselm Casimir Wambold von Umstadt was the son of Eberhard Wambolt Umstadt (1546–1601) and Anna von Reiffenberg (d. 1583). He was born on 30 November 1582, most likely in Speyer, where his father was an official in the Reichskammergericht. His father had been a Calvinist, but converted to Catholicism in 1581.

After being educated by the Jesuits, Anselm Casimir Wambold von Umstadt was admitted to the cathedral chapter of Mainz Cathedral in Mainz in 1596. He spent 1596-97 studying at the Collegium Germanicum in Rome and 1597-99 at the University of Würzburg. He then spent three years studying philosophy and theology in Rome.

He returned to Mainz in 1604, and was ordained as a deacon on 11 May 1605, at which time he became a member of the cathedral chapter. He then spent the next two years studying law at the University of Padua.

In June 1608, Archbishop of Mainz Johann Schweikhard von Kronberg named him a member of his Hofrat, becoming its president in January 1609, a position he held until 1618. During this period, he often served as the archbishop's representative to members of the Catholic League. In 1619, he became Amtmann of Mombach, a post he held until 1629. He was also rector of the University of Mainz from 1620 to 1624.

On 6 August 1629, the Mainz cathedral chapter elected Anselm Casimir Wambold von Umstadt as the new Archbishop of Mainz. Pope Urban VIII confirmed his election on 28 January 1630.

With the Thirty Years War raging, on Christmas 1631, forces under Gustavus Adolphus of Sweden occupied Mainz, though the archbishop had already fled to Cologne. The city was recaptured from Swedish forces in December 1635, and the archbishop returned on 22 June 1636. On 22 December 1636, at Regensburg, he crowned Ferdinand III as King of the Romans. In 1644, French troops occupied Mainz, and the archbishop fled to Frankfurt.

An ardent supporter of the Catholic position during the Thirty Years War, his intransigence was partially responsible for delaying the signing of the Peace of Westphalia until after his death.

After concluding a peace with the French, Anselm Casimir Wambold von Umstadt died in Frankfurt on 9 October 1647.

Catholic Church titles
Preceded by Georg Friedrich von Greiffenklau	Archbishop-Elector of Mainz; 1629–1647	Succeeded by Johann Philipp von Schönborn
