= Reinhard von Rüppurr =

German Prince-Bishop

Reinhard von Rüppurr (or Rippur) was the Prince-Bishop of Worms. He was appointed Bishop on 9 February 1504 and resigned ca. 1523.

Catholic Church titles
Preceded by Johann von Dalberg	Prince-Bishop of Worms; 1504–1523	Succeeded by Henry of the Palatinate
