= Georg von Schönenberg =

16th-century Roman Catholic bishop

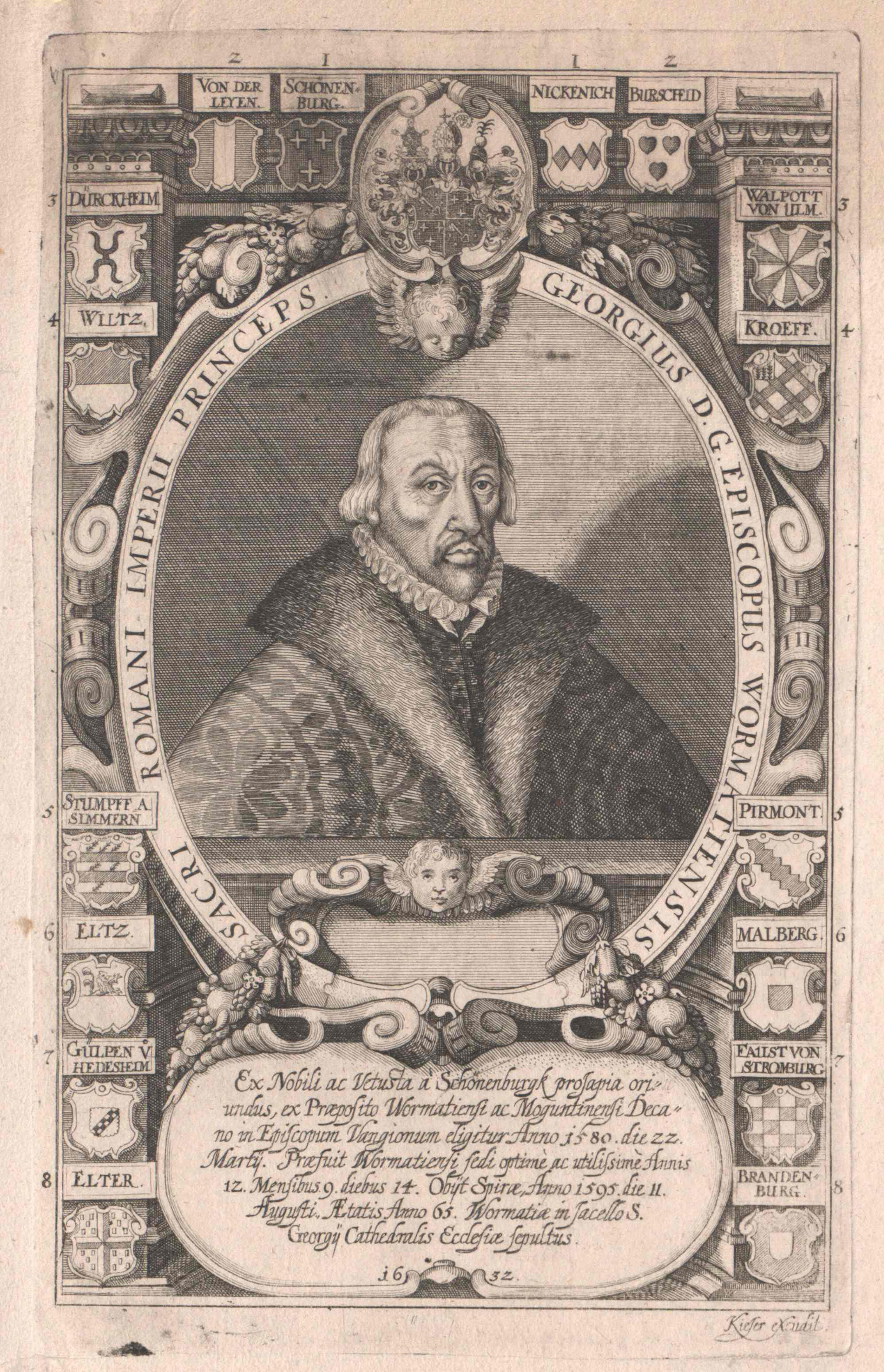
Georg von Schönenberg

Georg von Schönenberg (1530 – 11 August 1595) was the Prince-Bishop of Worms from 1581 to 1595. He was appointed bishop on January 16, 1581, and died in office on August 11, 1595.

== Numismatics ==
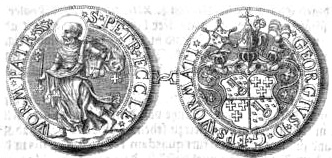
Georg von Schönenberg is numismatically significant, as during his reign as Prince-Bishop of Worms he minted coins at Neuleiningen.

Catholic Church titles
| Preceded by Dietrich von Rothenstein | Prince-Bishop of Worms; 1581–1595 | Succeeded by Philipp von Rothenstein |
