= Philipp von Rothenstein =

German Prince-Bishop

Philipp von Rothenstein (died 21 March 1604) was the Prince-Bishop of Worms from 1596 to 1604. He was appointed bishop on July 15, 1596, and died in office on March 21, 1604.

Catholic Church titles
Preceded by Georg von Schönenberg	Prince-Bishop of Worms; 1596–1604	Succeeded by Philipp Kraft von Scharsenstein
