= Wilhelm von Essern =

Prince-Bishop of Worms (1565–1616)

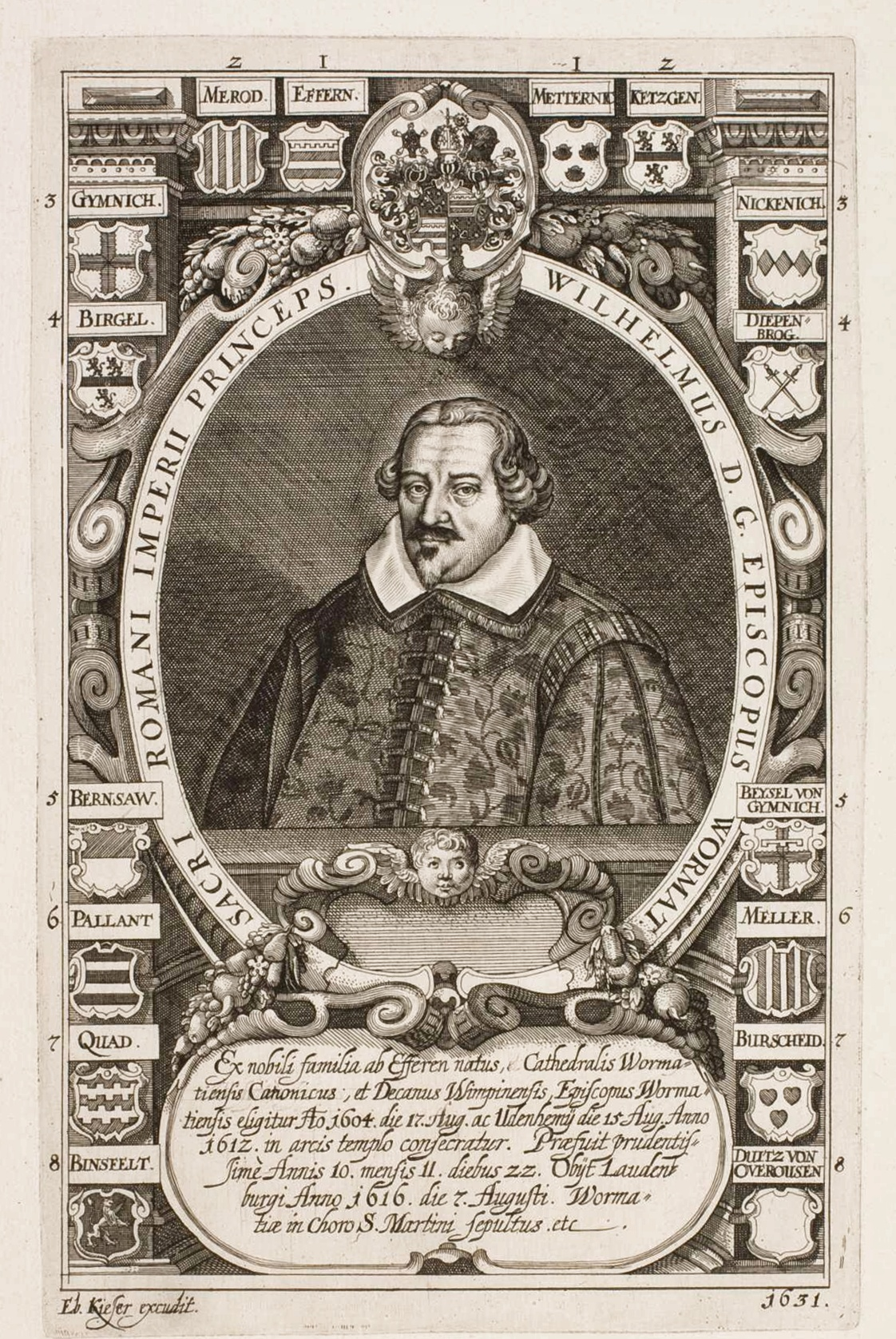
- Wilhelm von Essern (also known as Wilhelm von Efferen)
- Church: Roman Catholic Church
- Diocese: Bishopric of Worms
- Appointed: 12 September 1605
- Installed: 1605
- Term ended: 1616
- Predecessor: Philipp Kraft von Scharsenstein
- Successor: Georg Friedrich von Greiffenklau

Personal details
- Born: 1565
- Died: July 7, 1616
- Cause of death: Died in office

Wilhelm von Essern (1565 – 7 July 1616) was the Prince-Bishop of Worms from 1605 to 1616. He was appointed bishop on 12 September 1605 and died in office on 7 July 1616.

Catholic Church titles
Preceded by Philipp Kraft von Scharsenstein	Prince-Bishop of Worms; 1605–1616	Succeeded by Georg Friedrich von Greiffenklau
