= Dietrich von Rothenstein =

German Prince-Bishop

Dietrich von Rothenstein (died 31 January 1580) was the Prince-Bishop of Worms from 1552 to 1580. He was appointed bishop on November 28, 1552, and died in office on January 31, 1580.

Catholic Church titles
Preceded by Henry of the Palatinate	Prince-Bishop of Worms; 1552–1580	Succeeded by Georg von Schönenberg
