= Johann von Dalberg =

German Prince-Bishop

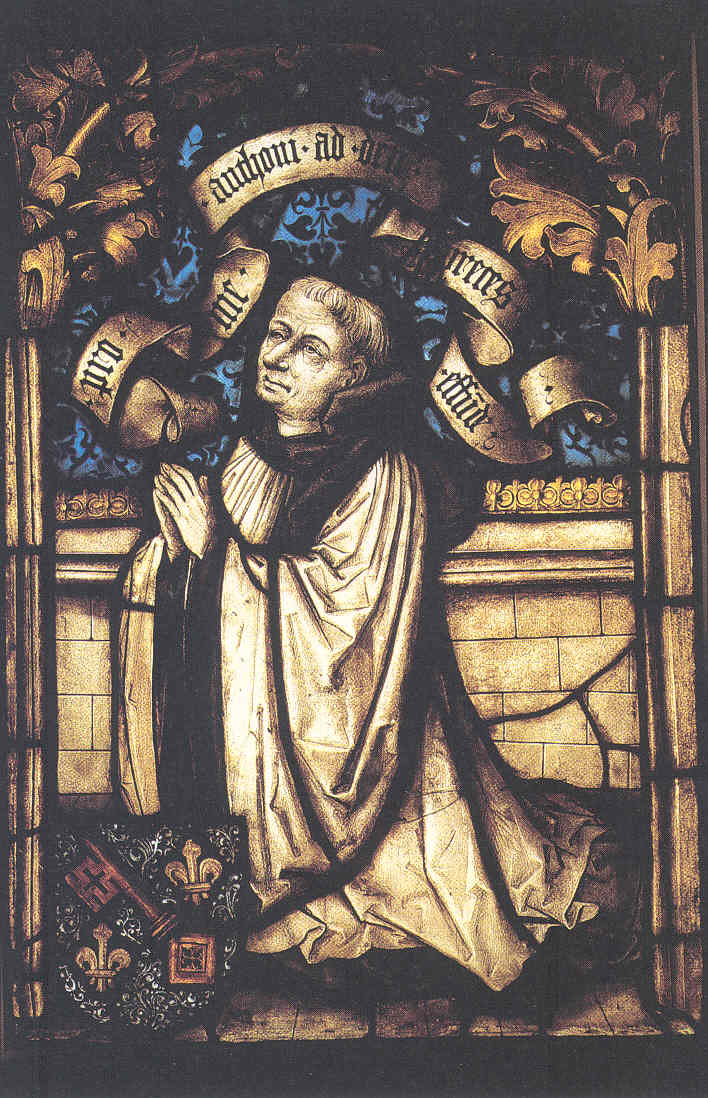
- Johann von Dalberg
- Church: Roman Catholic Church
- Diocese: Bishopric of Worms
- Installed: 1482
- Term ended: 1503
- Predecessor: Reinhard von Sackingen
- Successor: Reinhard von Rüppurr

Personal details
- Born: 1445
- Died: July 28, 1503
- Occupation: Privy councillor, humanist scholar, diplomat
- Education: University of Erfurt; University of Ferrara (Dr. iur. utr.)

Johann von Dalberg (1445–1503) was the Prince-Bishop of Worms from 1482 to 1503.

== Biography ==
Johann von Dalberg was born in 1445, the son of Wolfgang von Dalberg. He studied at Erfurt and in Italy, where he took his degree of doctor utriusque juris at the University of Ferrara and devoted himself more especially to the study of Greek.

Returning to Germany, he became privy councillor to Philip, Elector Palatine, whom he assisted in bringing the University of Heidelberg to the height of its fame. He was instrumental in founding the first chair of Greek, which was filled by his friend Rudolphus Agricola, and he also established the university library and a college for students of civil law. He was an ardent humanist, was president of the Sodalitas Celtica founded by the poet Konrad Celtes, and corresponded with many of the leading scholars of his day, to whom he showed himself a veritable Maecenas. He was employed also on various diplomatic missions by the emperor and the elector.

He became Prince-Bishop of Worms in 1482 and died on 28 July 1503.

Dalberg's students include Conrad Celtis.

Catholic Church titles
Preceded by Reinhard von Sackingen	Prince-Bishop of Worms; 1482–1503	Succeeded by Reinhard von Rüppurr
