= List of state leaders in the 17th-century Holy Roman Empire =

This is a list of state leaders in the 17th century (1601–1700) AD, of the Holy Roman Empire.

== Main ==
- Holy Roman Empire, Kingdom of Germany

- Emperors Elect, Kings –

- Rudolph II, Emperor Elect (1576–1612), King (1575–1612)
- Matthias, Emperor Elect (1612–1619), King (1612–1618)
- Ferdinand II, Emperor Elect (1619–1637), King (1618–1637)
- Ferdinand III, Emperor Elect (1637–1657), King (1636–1657)
- Ferdinand IV, co-King (1653–1654)
- Leopold I, Emperor Elect, King (1658–1705)

- Imperial Vice Chancellors (Reichsvizekanzlers, 1527–1806) –

- Rudolf Coraduz von und zu Nußdorf, Vice Chancellor (1597–1606)
- Leopold von Stralendorf, Vice Chancellor (1606–1612)
- Hans Ludwig von Ulm, Vice Chancellor (1612–1627)
- Peter Heinrich von Stralendorf, Vice Chancellor (1627–1637)
- Ferdinand Sigismund Graf Kurtz von Senftenau, Vice Chancellor (1637–1659)
- Wilderich von Walderdorff, Vice Chancellor (1660–1669)
- Leopold Wilhelm Graf von Königsegg-Rothenfels, Vice Chancellor (1669–1694)
- Gottlieb Amadeus Graf von Windisch-Graetz, Vice Chancellor (1694–1695)
- Dominik Andreas I. von Kaunitz, Vice Chancellor (1698–1705)

== Austrian ==
- Archduchy of Austria (complete list) –

- Rudolf V, Archduke (1576–1608)
- Matthias, Archduke (1608–1619)
- Albert VII, Archduke (1619)
- Ferdinand III, Archduke (1590, 1619–1637)
- Ferdinand IV, Archduke (1637–1657)
- Leopold V, Archduke (1623–1632)
- Ferdinand Charles, Archduke (1632–1662)
- Sigismund Francis, Archduke (1662–1665)
- Leopold VI, Archduke (1657, 1665–1705)

- Principality of Auersperg (complete list) –

- Johann Weikhard, Prince (1653–1677)
- Johann Ferdinand, Prince (1677–1705)

- Prince-Bishopric of Brixen (complete list) –

- Christopher Andrew of Spauer, Prince-bishop (1601–1613)
- Charles of Austria, Prince-bishop (1613–1624)
- Hieronymus Otto Agricola, Prince-bishop (1625–1627)
- Daniel Zen, Prince-bishop (1627–1628)
- Wilhelm of Welsperg, Prince-bishop (1629–1641)
- Johann Platzgummer, Prince-bishop (1641–1647)
- Anton Crosini of Bonporto, Prince-bishop (1647–1663)
- Sigmund Alphons of Thun, Prince-bishop (1663–1677)
- Paulinus Mayr, Prince-bishop (1677–1685)
- Johann Franz Graf Khuen of Belasi, Prince-bishop (1685–1702)

- Duchy of Carinthia (complete list) –

- Ferdinand II, Duke (1590–1637)

- Prince-Bishopric of Chur (complete list) –

- Peter de Raschèr, Prince-bishop (1581–1601)
- Johannes V. Flugi, Prince-bishop (1601–1627)
- Joseph Mohr von Zernez, Prince-bishop (1627–1635)
- Johannes VI. Flugi von Aspermont, Prince-bishop (1636–1661)
- Ulrich VI. de Mont, Prince-bishop (1661–1692)
- Ulrich VII. Freiherr von Federspiel, Prince-bishop (1692–1728)

- Principality of Heitersheim (complete list) –

- Johann Philipp Lesch von Mühlheim, Prince-prior (1599–1601)
- Wiprecht von Rosenbach, Prince-prior (1601–1607)
- Arbogast von Andlau, Prince-prior (1607–1612)
- Johann Friedrich Hund von Saulheim, Prince-prior (1612–1635)
- Hartmann von der Tann, Prince-prior (1635–1647)
- Frederick of Hesse-Darmstadt, Prince-prior (1647–1682)
- Franz von Sonnenberg, Prince-prior (1682)
- Gottfried Droste zu Vischering, Prince-prior (1683)
- Hermann von Wachtendonk, Prince-prior (1683–1704)

- Liechtenstein (complete list) –

- Karl I, Prince (1608–1627)
- Karl Eusebius, Prince (1627–1684)
- Hans-Adam I, Prince (1684–1712)

- Duchy of Styria (complete list) –

- Ferdinand II, Duke (1590–1637)

- Tarasp –

1684–1864

- Prince-Bishopric of Trent (complete list) –

- Carlo Gaudenzio Madruzzo, Prince-bishop (1600–1629)
- Carlo Emanuele Madruzzo, Prince-bishop (1629–1658)
- Sigismund Francis of Austria, Prince-bishop (1659–1665)
- Ernst Adalbert von Harrach, Prince-bishop (1665–1667)
- Sigismund Alfons von Thun, Prince-bishop (1668–1677)
- Francesco Alberti di Pola, Prince-bishop (1677–1689)
- Giuseppe Vittorio Alberti di Enno, Prince-bishop (1689–1695)
- Johann Michael Graf von Spaur, Prince-bishop (1696–1725)

== Bavarian ==
- Duchy/ Electorate of Bavaria (complete list) –

- Maximilian I, Duke (1597–1623), Elector (1623–1651)
- Ferdinand Maria, Elector (1651–1679)
- Maximilian II Emanuel, Elector (1679–1726)

- Berchtesgaden Prince-Provostry (complete list) –

- Ferdinand of Bavaria, Prince-provost (1594–1650)
- Maximilian Heinrich of Bavaria, Prince-provost (1650–1688)
- Joseph Clemens of Bavaria, Prince-provost (1688–1723)

- Prince-Bishopric of Freising (complete list) –

- Ernest of Bavaria, Prince-bishop (1566–1612)
- Stephen of Seiboldsdorf, Prince-bishop (1612–1618)
- Veit Adam of Gepeckh, Prince-bishop (1618–1651)
- Albert Sigismund of Bavaria, Prince-bishop (1651/52–1685)
- Joseph Clemens of Bavaria, Prince-bishop (1685–1694)
- John Francis Eckher of Kapfing and Liechteneck, Prince-bishop (1694/95–1727)

- Landgraviate of Leuchtenberg (de:complete list) –

- Georg IV. Ludwig (Leuchtenberg), Landgrave (1567–1613)
- Wilhelm (Leuchtenberg), Landgrave (1614–1621)
- Maximilian Adam (Leuchtenberg), Landgrave (1621–1646)

- Prince-Abbey of Niedermünster (complete list) –

- Katharina II Scheifflin, Abbess (1598–1605)
- Eva von Uhrhausen, Abbess (1605–1616)
- Anna Maria von Salis, Abbess (1616–1652)
- Maria Margarethe von Sigertshofen, Abbess (1652–1675)
- Maria Theresia von Muggenthal, Abbess (1675–1693)
- Regina Recordin von Rein und Hamberg, Abbess (1693–1697)
- Johanna Franziska Sibylla von Muggenthal, Abbess (1697–1723)

- Prince-Abbey of Obermünster (complete list) –

- Margarethe II Mufflin, Abbess (1594–1608)
- Katharina Praxedis von Perckhausen, Abbess (1608–1649)
- Maria Elisabeth von Salis, Abbess (1649–1683)
- Maria Theresia von Sandizell, Abbess (1683–1719)

- Imperial County of Ortenburg (complete list) –

- Henry VII, Count (1600–1603)
- George IV, Count (1603–1627)
- Frederick Casimir, Count (1627–1658)
- George Reinhard, Count (1658–1666)
- Christian, Count (1666–1684)
- George Philip, Count (1684–1702)

- Palatinate-Birkenfeld-Gelnhausen –

- John Charles, Count (1654–1704)

- Palatinate-Sulzbach –

- Otto Henry, Count (1569–1604)
- Augustus, Count (1614–1632)
- Christian Augustus, Count (1632–1708)

- Pappenheim (complete list) –

- Philip, Lord (1558–1619)
- Wolfgang Christopher, Lord (1585–1628), Count (1628–1635)
- Wolfgang Philip, Count (1628–1671)
- Charles Philip Gustav, Count (1671–1692)
- Louis Francis, Count (1692–1697)
- Christian Ernest, co-Count (1697–1721)

- Prince-Bishopric of Passau (complete list) –

- Leopold V, Archduke of Austria, Prince-Bishop (1598–1625)
- Archduke Leopold Wilhelm of Austria, Prince-Bishop (1625–1662)
- Archduke Charles Joseph of Austria, Prince-Bishop (1662–1664)
- Wenzeslaus of Thun, Prince-Bishop (1664–1673)
- Sebastian of Pötting, Prince-Bishop (1673–1689)
- John Philip of Lamberg, Prince-Bishop (1689–1712)

- Prince-Bishopric of Regensburg (complete list) –

- Wolfgang II von Hausen, Prince-bishop (1600–1613)
- Albert IV von Toerring-Stein, Prince-bishop (1613–1649)
- Franz Wilhelm von Wartenberg, Prince-bishop (1649–1661)
- Johann Georg von Herberstein, Prince-bishop (1662–1663)
- Adam Lorenz von Toerring-Stein, Prince-bishop (1663–1666)
- Guidobald von Thun, Prince-bishop (1666–1668)
- Albrecht Sigismund von Bayern, Prince-bishop (1668–1685)
- Joseph Clemens of Bavaria, Prince-bishop (1685–1716)

- Prince-Archbishopric of Salzburg (complete list) –

- Wolf Dietrich von Raitenau, Prince-archbishop (1587–1612)
- Marcus Sittich of Hohenems, Prince-archbishop (1612–1619)
- Paris von Lodron, Prince-archbishop (1619–1653)
- Guidobald of Thun, Prince-archbishop (1654–1668)
- Maximilian Gandalf of Kuenburg, Prince-archbishop (1668–1687)
- Johann Ernst von Thun und Hohenstein, Prince-archbishop (1687–1709)

== Bohemian and Hungary ==
- Kingdom of Bohemia, Kingdom of Hungary (complete list, complete list) –

- Rudolph II, King of Bohemia (1576–1611), of Hungary (1576–1608)
- Matthias, King of Bohemia (1611–1619), of Hungary (1608–1619)
- Ferdinand II, King of Bohemia (1617–1619, 1620–1637), of Hungary (1619–1637)
- Frederick, King of Bohemia (1619–1620)
- Ferdinand III, King of Bohemia (1627–1657), of Hungary (1637–1657)
- Ferdinand IV, co-King of Bohemia (1646–1657), of Hungary (1647–1654)
- Leopold I, King of Bohemia (1656–1705), of Hungary (1657–1705)

- Margraviate of Moravia (complete list) –

- Rudolf II, Margrave (1576–1608)
- Matthias II, Margrave (1608–1617)

under the rule of the Bohemian kings since 1611

- Duchy of Cieszyn (Teschen) (complete list) –

- Adam Wenceslaus, Duke (1579–1617)
- Frederick William, Duke (1617–1625)
- Elizabeth Lucretia, Duchess (1625–1653)

== Burgundian-Low Countries ==
- County of Artois (complete list) –

- Isabella Clara Eugenia, Countess, and Albert, Count (1598–1621)
- Philip IV of Spain, Count (1621–1659)

For the succeeding rulers, see the County of Artois under the List of state leaders in the 17th century

- County of Burgundy (complete list) –

- Isabella Clara Eugenia, Countess, and Albert, Count (1598–1621)
- Philip VIII, Count (1621–1665)
- Charles III, Count (1665–1678)

- Duchy of Brabant (complete list) –

- Isabella Clara Eugenia, Duchess, Albert, Duke (1598–1621)
- Philip V, Duke (1621–1665)
- Charles III, Duke (1665–1700)
- Philip VI, Duke (1700–1706)

- County of Flanders (complete list) –

- Isabella Clara Eugenia, Countess (1598–1621)
- Philip VI, Count (1621–1665)
- Charles IV, Count (1665–1700)
- Philip VII, Count (1700–1706)

- Upper Guelders (complete list) –

under the Habsburg Monarchy

- Herman van den Bergh, Stadtholder (1593–1611)
- Frederik van den Bergh, Stadtholder (1611–1618)
- Hendrik van den Bergh, Stadtholder (1618–1632)
- occupation by the Dutch Republic (1632–1637)
- Willem Bette, Stadtholder (1640–1646)
- Jan Koenraard van Aubremont, Stadtholder (1646–1652)
- Filips Balthasar van Gendt, Stadtholder (1652–1680)
- Johan Frans Desideratus of Nassau-Siegen, Stadtholder (1680–1699)
- Philippe Emanuel, Stadtholder (1699–1702)

- County of Hainaut (complete list) –

under the Habsburg Monarchy

- Charles III de Croÿ, Stadtholder (1592–1606)
- Charles Bonaventure de Longueval, Stadtholder (1613–?)
- Philippe François, Stadtholder (1663–1674)

- County of Holland, Lordship of Utrecht, County of Zeeland (complete list) –

under the Habsburg Monarchy

- Maurice, Stadtholder (1585–1625)
- Frederick Henry, Stadtholder (1625–1647)
- William II, Stadtholder (1647–1650)
- First Stadtholderless Period (1650–1672)
- William III, Stadtholder (1672–1702)

- Duchy of Limburg (complete list) –

- Isabella, Duchess, and Albert, Duke (1598–1621)
- Philip V, Duke (1621–1665)
- Charles III, Duke (1665–1700)
- Philip VI, Duke (1700–1706)

- Duchy of Luxemburg

- Limburg-Luxemburg dynasty (complete list) –

- Isabella Clara Eugenia, Duchess, and Albert, Duke (1598–1621)
- Philip IV, Duke (1621–1665)
- Charles IV, Duke (1665–1700)
- Philip V, Duke (1700–1712)

- Stadtholders (complete list) –

- Peter Ernst I von Mansfeld-Vorderort, Stadtholder (1545–1552, 1559–1604)
- Philip of Croÿ-Ligne, Stadtholder (1654–1675)
- John Charles de Landas, acting Stadtholder (1675–late 17th century)
- Ernst of Croÿ-Ligne, Stadtholder (late 17th century)
- Henry de Lambert, Stadtholder (1684–1688)

- County of Namur (complete list) –

- Isabella Clara Eugenia, Margravine (1598–1621)
- Philip VI, Margrave (1621–1665)
- Charles III, Margrave (1665–1700)

== Franconian ==
- Prince-Bishopric of Bamberg (complete list) –

- Johann Philipp von Gebsattel, Prince-bishop (1599–1609)
- Johann Gottfried von Aschhausen, Prince-bishop (1609–1622)
- Johann Georg Fuchs von Dornheim, Prince-bishop (1623–1633)
- Franz von Hatzfeld, Prince-bishop (1633–1642 (Bishop of Würzburg, Prince-bishop (1631–1642)
- Melchior Otto von Voit von Salzburg, Prince-bishop (1642–1653)
- Philipp Valentin Albrecht Voit von Rieneck, Prince-bishop (1653–1672)
- Peter Philipp von Dernbach, Prince-bishop (1672–1683)
- Marquard Sebastian von Schenk von Stauffenberg, Prince-bishop (1683–1693)
- Lothar Franz von Schönborn, Prince-bishop (1693–1729)

- Brandenburg-Ansbach (complete list) –

- George Frederick I, Margrave of Brandenburg-Ansbach (1543–1603), of Brandenburg-Kulmbach (1553–1603)
- Joachim Ernst, Margrave (1603–1625)
- Frederick, Margrave (1625–1634)
- Albert, Margrave (1634–1667)
- John Frederick, Margrave (1667–1686)
- Christian Albrecht, Margrave (1686–1692)
- George Frederick II, Margrave (1692–1703)

- Brandenburg-Bayreuth (formally Brandenburg-Kulmbach) (complete list) –

- George Frederick I, Margrave of Brandenburg-Ansbach (1543–1603), of Brandenburg-Kulmbach (1553–1603)
- Christian, Margrave (1603–1655)
- Christian Ernst, Margrave (1655–1712)

- Prince-Bishopric of Eichstätt (complete list, de) –

- Johann Konrad von Gemmingen, Prince-bishop (1595–1612)
- Johann Christoph von Westerstetten, Prince-bishop (1612–1636)
- Marquard II Schenk von Castell, Prince-bishop (1637–1685)
- Johann Euchar Schenk von Castell, Prince-bishop (1685–1697)
- Johann Martin von Eyb, Prince-bishop (1697–1704)

- Hohenlohe-Bartenstein (complete list) –

- Philipp Karl zu Hohenlohe-Bartenstein, Count (1688–1729)

- Hohenlohe-Langenburg (complete list) –

- Philip Ernest, Count (1610–1628)
- Ludwig Kraft, Count (1628–1632)
- Joachim Albert, Count (1632–1650)
- Henry Frederick, Count (1650–1699)
- Albert Wolfgang, Count (1699–1715)

- Hohenlohe-Neuenstein –

- Philipp, co-Count of Hohenlohe-Neuenstein (1568–1586), Count (1586–1606)
- Wolfgang, co-Count of Hohenlohe-Neuenstein (1568–1586), Count of Hohenlohe-Weikersheim (1586–1606), of Hohenlohe-Neuenstein (1586–1610)
- Kraft III, Count (1610–1641)
- Kraft Magnus, co-Count (1645–c.1677)
- Philipp Maximilian Johann, co-Count (1645–c.1677)
- Johann Friedrich, co-Count of Hohenlohe-Neuenstein (1645–1677), Count of Hohenlohe-Oehringen (1677–1702)
- Johann Ludwig, co-Count of Hohenlohe-Neuenstein (1645–1677), Count of Hohenlohe-Künzelsau (1677–1689)
- Siegfried, co-Count of Hohenlohe-Neuenstein (1645–1677), Count of Hohenlohe-Weikersheim (1677–1684)
- Wolfgang Julius, co-Count of Hohenlohe-Neuenstein (1645–1677), Count of Hohenlohe-Neuenstein (1677–1698)

- Hohenlohe-Waldenburg-Pfedelbach –

- Ludwig Eberhard of Hohenlohe-Waldenburg-Pfedelbach (1600–1650)
- Friedrich Kraft of Hohenlohe-Waldenburg-Pfedelbach (1650–1681)
- Hezekiah of Hohenlohe-Waldenburg-Pfedelbach and Gleichen (1681–1685)
- Ludwig Gottfried of Hohenlohe-Waldenburg-Pfedelbach (1685–1728)

- Hohenlohe-Waldenburg-Schillingsfürst (complete list) –

- Louis Gustav, Count (1688–1697)
- Philipp Ernst zu Hohenlohe-Waldenburg-Schillingsfürst, Count (1697–1744), Prince (1744–1750)

- Hohenlohe-Weikersheim –

- Wolfgang, co-Count of Hohenlohe-Neuenstein (1568–1586), Count of Hohenlohe-Weikersheim (1586–1606), of Hohenlohe-Neuenstein (1586–1610)
- Georg Friedrich II, Count (1600–1635)
- Georg Friedrich, Count of Hohenlohe-Weikersheim (1610–1645)

- Schönborn (complete list) –

- Philip Erwin, Baron (1663–1668)
- John Erwin, Baron (1668–1701), Count (1701–1705)

- Prince-Bishopric of Würzburg (complete list) –

- Julius Echter von Mespelbrunn, Prince-bishop (1573–1617)
- Johann Gottfried von Aschhausen, Prince-bishop (1617–1622)
- Philipp Adolf von Ehrenberg, Prince-bishop (1622–1631)
- Franz von Hatzfeld, Prince-bishop (1631–1642)
- Johann Philipp von Schönborn, Prince-bishop (1642–1673)
- Johann Hartmann von Rosenbach, Prince-bishop (1673–1675)
- Peter Philipp von Dernbach, Prince-bishop (1675–1683)
- Konrad Wilhelm von Wernau, Prince-bishop (1683–1684)
- Johann Gottfried II von Gutenberg, Prince-bishop (1684–1698)
- Johann Philipp von Greifenclau zu Vollraths, Prince-bishop (1699–1719)

== Electoral Rhenish ==
- Arenberg (complete list) –

- Charles, Princely Count (1599–1616)
- Philip Charles, Princely Count (1616–1640)
- Philippe François, Princely Count (1640–1645), Duke (1645–1675)
- Charles Eugene, Duke (1675–1681)
- Philip Charles, Duke (1681–1691)
- Leopold, Duke (1691–1754)

- Elector-Archbishopric of Cologne (complete list) –

- Ernest of Bavaria, Archbishop-elector (1583–1612)
- Ferdinand of Bavaria, Archbishop-elector (1612–1650)
- Maximilian Henry of Bavaria, Archbishop-elector (1650–1688)
- Joseph Clemens of Bavaria, Archbishop-elector (1688–1723)

- Elector-Bishopric of Mainz (complete list) –

- Wolfgang von Dalberg, Archbishop-elector (1582–1601)
- Johann Adam von Bicken, Archbishop-elector (1601–1604)
- Johann Schweikhard von Kronberg, Archbishop-elector (1604–1626)
- Georg Friedrich von Greiffenklau, Archbishop-elector (1626–1629)
- Anselm Casimir Wambold von Umstadt, Archbishop-elector (1629–1647)
- Johann Philipp von Schönborn, Archbishop-elector (1647–1673)
- Lothar Friedrich von Metternich-Burscheid, Archbishop-elector (1673–1675)
- Damian Hartard von der Leyen-Hohengeroldseck, Archbishop-elector (1675–1678)
- Karl Heinrich von Metternich-Winneburg, Archbishop-elector (1679)
- Anselm Franz von Ingelheim, Archbishop-elector (1679–1695)
- Lothar Franz von Schönborn, Archbishop-elector (1695–1729)

- Nieder-Isenburg (Lower Isenburg) (complete list) –

- Salentin VIII, Count (1532–1610)
- Salentin IX, Count (1580–1619)
- Ernst, Count (1584–1664)

- Electoral Palatinate (complete list) –

Palatinate-Birkenfeld-Bischweiler
Palatinate-Birkenfeld-Gelnhausen
Palatinate-Kleeburg
Palatinate-Landsberg
Palatinate-Neuburg
Palatinate-Simmern
Palatinate-Sulzbach
Palatinate-Sulzbach-Hilpoltsein
Palatinate-Veldenz
Palatinate-Veldenz-Gutenberg
Palatinate-Veldenz-Lützelstein
Palatinate-Zweibrücken
Palatinate-Zweibrücken-Birkenfeld

- Otto Henry, Count Palatine of Sulzbach (1569–1604)
- Philip Louis, Count Palatine of Neuburg (1569–1604)
- Philip Louis, Count Palatine of Neuburg and Sulzbach (1604–1614)
- Frederick IV the Righteous, Elector (1583–1610)
- George Gustavus, Count Palatine of Veldenz (1598–1634)
- John Augustus, Count Palatine of Veldenz-Lützelstein (1598–1611)
- Louis Philip I, Count Palatine of Veldenz-Gutenberg (1598–1601)
- George John II, Count Palatine of Veldenz-Gutenberg (1598–1654)
- George William, Count Palatine of Zweibrücken-Birkenfeld (1608–1669)
- Christian I, Count Palatine of Birkenfeld-Gelnhausen (1615–1654)
- John II the Younger, Count Palatine of Zweibrücken (1604–1635)
- Frederick Casimir, Count Palatine of Landsberg (1604–1645)
- John Casimir, Count Palatine of Kleeburg (1604–1652)
- Frederick V the Winter King, Elector (1610–1623)
- Electoral Palatinate briefly annexed to Maximilian I, Electorate of Bavaria (1623–1648)
- Louis Philip II, Count Palatine of Simmern (1610–1655)
- Wolfgang William, Count Palatine of Neuburg (1614–1653)
- Augustus, Count Palatine of Sulzbach (1614–1632)
- John Frederick, Count Palatine of Sulzbach-Hilpoltsein (1614–1644)
- Christian Augustus, Count Palatine of Sulzbach (1632–1708)
- Leopold Louis, Count Palatine of Veldenz (1634–1694)
- Frederick I, Count Palatine of Zweibrücken (1635–1661)
- Frederick Louis, Count Palatine of Landsberg (1645–1661)
- Frederick Louis, Count Palatine of Zweibrücken (1661–1677)
- Charles Louis, Elector (1648–1680)
- Charles Gustavus, Count Palatine of Kleeburg (1652–1654)
- Adolph John I, Count Palatine of Kleeburg (1654–1689)
- Louis Henry, Count Palatine of Simmern (1655–1674)
- Charles Otto, Count Palatine of Zweibrücken-Birkenfeld (1669–1671)
- Christian II, Count Palatine of Birkenfeld-Gelnhausen (1654–1671)
- Charles II, Elector (1680–1685)
- Philip William, Count Palatine of Neuburg (1653–1685)
- Philip William, Elector (1685–1690)
- Charles III, Count Palatine of Zweibrücken (1693–1697)
- John Charles, Count Palatine of Birkenfeld-Gelnhausen (1654–1704)
- Christian II, Count Palatine of Zweibrücken-Birkenfeld (1671–1717)
- Adolph John II, Count Palatine of Kleeburg (1689–1701)
- John William, Elector (1690–1716)

- Thurn und Taxis (complete list) –

- Lamoral von Taxis, Count of Taxis (1624)
- Leonhard II. von Taxis, Count of Taxis (1624–1628)
- Alexandrine von Taxis, Regent (1628–1646)
- Lamoral II Claudius Franz, Count (1628–1676)
- Eugen Alexander, Count (1676–1695), Prince (1695–1714)

- Elector-Bishopric of Trier (complete list) –

- Lothar von Metternich, Archbishop-elector (1599–1623)
- Philipp Christoph von Sötern, Archbishop-elector (1623–1652)
- Karl Kaspar von der Leyen-Hohengeroldseck, Archbishop-elector (1652–1676)
- Johann Hugo von Orsbeck, Archbishop-elector (1676–1711)

== Lower Rhenish–Westphalian ==
- Bentheim-Alpen (complete list) –

- Frederick Ludolph, Count (1606–1629)

- Bentheim-Limburg (complete list) –

- Conrad Gumbert, Count (1606–1632)

- Bentheim-Bentheim (complete list) –

- Philip Conrad, Count (1643–1668)
- Arnold Maurice, Count (1668–1701)

- Bentheim-Steinfurt (complete list) –

- Arnold III, Count (1562–1606)
- Arnold Jobst, Count (1606–1643)
- William Henry, Count (1606–1632)
- Frederick Ludolph, Count (1606–1629)
- Conrad Gumbert, Count (1606–1618)
- Ernest William, Count (1643–1693)
- Ernest, Count (1693–1713)

- Bentheim-Tecklenburg(-Rheda) (complete list, complete list) –

- Arnold III, Count of Bentheim-Tecklenburg (1562–1606)
- Adolf, Count of Bentheim-Tecklenburg-Rheda (1606–1623/25)
- Maurice, Count of Bentheim-Tecklenburg-Rheda (1623/25–1674)
- John Adolph, Count of Bentheim-Tecklenburg-Rheda (1674–1701/04)

- Prince-Archbishopric of Bremen (complete list) –

- John Frederick, Prince-archbishop (1596–1634)
- Frederick II, Prince-archbishop (1635–1645)
- Leopold William of Austria, Prince-archbishop (1635–1645)
- Franz Wilhelm, Administrator (1645)
secularised into Duchy of Bremen, see Bremen-Verden

- Duchy of Cleves, County of Mark (complete list, complete list) –

- John William, Duke of Cleves, Count of Mark (1592–1609)
- John Sigismund of Hohenzollern, Duke of Cleves, Count of Mark (1614–1619)

incorporated into Brandenburg

- Princely Abbey of Corvey (de:complete list) –

- Dietrich IV. von Beringhausen, Prince-abbot (1585–1616)
- Heinrich V. von Aschenbrock, Prince-abbot (1616–1624)
- Johann Christoph von Brambach, Prince-abbot (1624–1638)
- Arnold IV von Waldois, Prince-abbot (1638–1661)
- Christoph Bernhard von Galen, Prince-abbot (1661–1678)
- Christoph von Bellinghausen, Prince-abbot (1678–1696)
- Florenz von dem Felde, Prince-abbot (1696–1714)

- Essen Abbey (complete list) –

- Margarete Elisabeth von Manderscheid-Blankenheim, Princess-Abbess (1598–1604)
- Elisabeth IX von Bergh-s’Heerenberg, Princess-Abbess (1604–1614)
- Maria Clara von Spaur, Pflaum und Vallier, Princess-Abbess (1614–1644)
- Anna Eleonore von Stauffen, Princess-Abbess (1644–1645)
- Anna Salome von Salm-Reifferscheid, Princess-Abbess (1646–1688)
- Anna Salome of Manderscheid-Blankenheim, Princess-Abbess (1690–1691)
- Bernhardine Sophia of East Frisia and Rietberg, Princess-Abbess (1691–1726)

- County of East Frisia (complete list) –

- Enno III, Count (1599–1625)
- Rudolf Christian, Count (1625–1628)
- Ulrich II, Count (1628–1648)
- Juliana of Hesse-Darmstadt, Regent (1648–1651)
- Enno Louis, Count (1651–1654), Prince (1654–1660)
- George Christian, Prince (1660–1665)
- Christian Everhard, Prince (1690–1708)

- Herford Abbey (complete list) –

- Magdalene I of Lippe, Abbess (1586–1604)
- Felicitas II of Eberstein, Abbess (1604–1621)
- Magdalene II of Lippe, Abbess (1621–1640)
- Sidonia of Oldenburg, Abbess (1640–1649)
- Maria Clara Theresa of Wartenberg, rival abbess 1629–1631
- Elisabeth II, Abbess (1649–1667)
- Elisabeth III, Abbess (1667–1680)
- Elisabeth IV, Abbess (1680–1686)
- Elisabeth V, Abbess (1686–1688)
- Charlotte Sophia, Abbess (1688–1728)

- Prince-Bishopric of Liège (complete list) –

- Ernest of Bavaria, Prince-Bishop (1581–1612)
- Ferdinand of Bavaria, Prince-Bishop (1612–1650)
- Maximilian Henry of Bavaria, Prince-Bishop (1650–1688)
- John Louis of Elderen, Prince-Bishop (1688–1694)
- Joseph Clemens of Bavaria, Prince-Bishop (1694–1723)

- Limburg-Styrum-Bronchhorst-Borkelö (complete list) –

- Otto, Count (1644–1679)
- George Albert, Count (1679–1690)
- Frederick William, Count (1679–1724)

- Limburg-Styrum-Gemen (complete list) –

- Adolph Ernest, Count (1644–1657)
- Herman Otto II, Count (1657–1704)

- Limburg-Styrum-Iller-Aichheim (complete list) –

- Maximilian William, Count (1657–1724)

- Limburg-Styrum-Styrum (complete list) –

- Moritz, Count (1644–1664)
- Moritz Hermann, Count (1664–1703)

- County of Lippe (complete list) –

- Simon VI, Count (1563–1613)
- Simon VII, Count (1613–1627)
- Simon Ludwig, Count (1627–1636)
- Simon Philipp, Count (1636–1650)
- Johann Bernhard, Count (1650–1652)
- Hermann Adolf, Count (1652–1666)
- Simon Heinrich, Count (1666–1697)
- Friedrich Adolf, Count (1697–1718)

- Prince-Bishopric of Münster (complete list) –

- Ernest of Bavaria, Prince-bishop (1585–1612)
- Ferdinand I of Bavaria, Prince-bishop (1612–1650)
- Bernhard von Galen, Prince-bishop (1650–1678)
- Ferdinand II of Fürstenberg, Prince-bishop (1678–1683)
- Maximilian Henry of Bavaria, Prince-bishop (1683–1688)
- Frederick Christian of Plettenberg, Prince-bishop (1688–1706)

- County of Oldenburg (complete list) –

- John VII, Count (1573–1603)
- Anthony II, Count of Oldenburg-Delmenhorst, Count (1573–1619)
- Anthony Günther, Count (1603–1667)
- Frederick I, Count (1667–1670)
- Christian VIII, Count (1670–1699)
- Frederick II, Count (1699–1730)

- Prince-Bishopric of Osnabrück (complete list) –

- Philip Sigismund, Prince-bishop (1591–1623)
- Eitel Frederick, Prince-bishop (1623–1625)
- Franz Wilhelm, Prince-bishop (1625–1634)
- Gustav Gustavsson af Vasaborg, Prince-bishop (1634–1648)
- Franz Wilhelm von Wartenberg, Prince-bishop (1648–1661)
- Ernest Augustus, Prince-bishop (1662–1698)
- Charles Joseph of Lorraine, Prince-bishop (1698–1715)

- Prince-Bishopric of Paderborn (complete list) –

- Dietrich IV, Bishop of Paderborn, Prince-bishop (1585–1618)
- Ferdinand I of Bavaria, Prince-bishop (1618–1650)
- Dietrich Adolf of Recke, Prince-bishop (1650–1661)
- Ferdinand II of Fürstenberg, Prince-bishop (1661–1683)
- Hermann Werner von Wolff-Metternich zur Gracht, Prince-bishop (1683–1704)

- County of Sayn (complete list) –

- Henry IV, co-Count (1560–1606)
- Anna Elizabeth, Countess (1606–1608)

- County of Schaumburg (complete list) –

- Adolf XI, Count (1576–1601)
- Ernest, Count (1601–1619), Prince (1619–1622)
- Jobst Herman, Prince (1622–1635)
- Otto V, Prince (1635–1640)

- Prince-Bishopric of Verden (complete list) –

- Frederick, Prince of Denmark, Prince-Bishop (1623–1629)
- Francis William of Wartenberg, Prince-Bishop (1630–1631)
- John Frederick of Schleswig-Holstein at Gottorp, Prince-Bishop (1631–1634)
- Frederick of Denmark, Prince-Bishop (1635–1645)
- rule by the Swedish occupants (1645–1648)
secularised to hereditary rule, see Bremen-Verden

- County of Wied (complete list) –

- William IV, co-Count (1581–1612)
- Herman II, Count (1581–1631)
- Frederick II, Count (1631–1698)

partitioned into Wied-Neuwied and Wied-Runkel

- Wied-Dierdorf (complete list) –

- John Ernest, Count (1631–1664)
- Louis Frederick, Count (1664–1709)

- Wied-Neuwied (complete list) –

- Frederick William, Count (1698–1737)

- Wied-Runkel (complete list) –

- Johann Friederich Wilhelm, Count (1698–1699)
- Maximilian Heinrich, Count (1692–1706)

== Upper Rhenish ==
- Prince-Bishopric of Basel (complete list) –

- Jakob Christoph Blarer von Wartensee, Prince-bishop (1575–1608)
- Wilhelm Rink von Baldenstein, Prince-bishop (1608–1628)
- Johann Heinrich von Ostheim, Prince-bishop (1628–1646)
- Beat Albrecht von Ramstein, Prince-bishop (1646–1651)
- Johann Franz von Schönau-Zell, Prince-bishop (1651–1656)
- Johann Konrad von Roggenbach, Prince-bishop (1656–1693)
- Wilhelm Jakob Rink von Baldenstein, Prince-bishop (1693–1705)

- Free City of Frankfurt

- Senior Mayors (de:complete list) –

- Johann Ludwig von Glauburg, Senior Mayor (1600–1601)
- Johann Adolf Kellner, Senior Mayor (1601–1602)
- Johann Philipp Völcker, Senior Mayor (1602–1603)
- Hieronymus zum Jungen, Senior Mayor (1603–1604)
- Johann von Melem, Senior Mayor (1604–1605)
- Daniel Braumann, Senior Mayor (1605–1606)
- Philipp Rücker, Senior Mayor (1606–1607)
- Jacob am Steg, Senior Mayor (1607–1608)
- Johann Adolf Kellner, Senior Mayor (1608–1609)
- Hieronymus zum Jungen, Senior Mayor (1609–1610)
- Nicolaus Ulrich Faust von Aschaffenburg, Senior Mayor (1610–1611)
- Christoph Ludwig Völcker, Senior Mayor (1611–1612)
- Jacob am Steg, Senior Mayor (1612–1613)
- Johann Hartmann Beyer, Senior Mayor (1613–1614)
- Nicolaus Greiff, Senior Mayor (1614–1615)
- Philipp Ludwig Fleischbein, Senior Mayor (1615–1616)
- Johann Adolf Kellner, Senior Mayor (1616–1617)
- Georg Sand, Senior Mayor (1617–1618)
- Daniel von Stalburg, Senior Mayor (1618–1619)
- Johann Hector zum Jungen, Senior Mayor (1619–1620)
- Johann Bebinger, Senior Mayor (1620–1621)
- Achilles von Hynsperg, Senior Mayor (1621–1622)
- Hieronymus Steffan von Cronstetten, Senior Mayor (1622–1623)
- Johann Philipp Weiß von Limpurg, Senior Mayor (1623–1624)
- Johann Ulrich von Neuhaus, Senior Mayor (1624–1625)
- Johann Philipp Orth, Senior Mayor (1625–1626)
- Achilles von Hynsperg, Senior Mayor (1626–1627)
- Hieronymus Steffan von Cronstetten, Senior Mayor (1627–1628)
- Jeremias Orth, Senior Mayor (1628–1629)
- Johann Ludwig von Glauburg, Senior Mayor (1629–1630)
- Johann Philipp Weiß von Limpurg, Senior Mayor (1630–1631)
- Hector Wilhelm von Günderrode, Senior Mayor (1631–1632)
- Thomas Diller, Senior Mayor (1632–1633)
- Johann Jacob Jeckel, Senior Mayor (1633–1634)
- Johann Schwind, Senior Mayor (1634–1635)
- Hieronymus von Stalburg, Senior Mayor (1635–1636)
- Johann Maximilian Kellner, Senior Mayor (1636–1637)
- Christoph Treudel, Senior Mayor (1637–1638)
- Hector Wilhelm von Günderrode, Senior Mayor (1638–1639)
- Johann Heinrich zum Jungen, Senior Mayor (1639–1640)
- Johann Schwind, Senior Mayor (1640–1641)
- Hieronymus von Stalburg, Senior Mayor (1641–1642)
- Caspar Philipp Fleischbein, Senior Mayor (1642–1643)
- Johann Maximilian zum Jungen, Senior Mayor (1643–1644)
- Oyer Christoph Völcker, Senior Mayor (1644–1645)
- Jacob Marquard von Glauburg, Senior Mayor (1645–1646)
- Hieronymus von Stalburg, Senior Mayor (1646–1647)
- Johann Christoph Bender von Bienenthal, Senior Mayor (1647–1648)
- Johann Christoph Kellner, Senior Mayor (1648–1649)
- Erasmus Seiffart, Senior Mayor (1649–1650)
- Vincenz Steinmeyer, Senior Mayor (1650–1651)
- Philipp Christian Uffsteiner, Senior Mayor (1651–1652)
- Adolf Steffan von Cronstetten, Senior Mayor (1652–1653)
- Oyer Christoph Völcker, Senior Mayor (1653–1654)
- Johann Christoph Bender von Bienenthal, Senior Mayor (1654–1655)
- Erasmus Seiffart, Senior Mayor (1655–1656)
- Adolf Steffan von Cronstetten, Senior Mayor (1656–1657)
- Johann Christoph Bender von Bienenthal, Senior Mayor (1657–1658)
- Vincenz Steinmeyer, Senior Mayor (1658–1659)
- Erasmus Seiffart, Senior Mayor (1659–1660)
- Hand Georg Grambs, Senior Mayor (1660–1661)
- Johann Christoph Bender von Bienenthal, Senior Mayor (1661–1662)
- Adolf Steffan von Cronstetten, Senior Mayor (1662–1663)
- Johann Hector von Holzhausen, Senior Mayor (1663–1664)
- Johann Conrad Cless, Senior Mayor (1664–1665)
- Hieronymus Peter von Stetten, Senior Mayor (1665–1666)
- Daniel Weitz, Senior Mayor (1666–1667)
- Philipp Christian Lersner, Senior Mayor (1667–1668)
- Anton Christian Mohr von Mohrenhelm, Senior Mayor (1668–1669)
- Johann Philipp Fleischbein, Senior Mayor (1669–1670)
- Johann Hieronymus Steffan von Cronstetten, Senior Mayor (1670–1671)
- Heinrich Wilhelm Kellner, Senior Mayor (1671–1672)
- Johann Jacob Baur von Eysseneck, Senior Mayor (1672–1673)
- Johann Conrad Cless, Senior Mayor (1673–1674)
- Daniel Weitz, Senior Mayor (1674–1675)
- Philipp Christian Lersner, Senior Mayor (1675–1676)
- Anton Christian Mohr von Mohrenhelm, Senior Mayor (1676–1677)
- Heinrich Wilhelm Kellner, Senior Mayor (1677–1678)
- Johann Jacob Baur von Eysseneck, Senior Mayor (1678–1679)
- Philipp Wilhelm von Günderrode, Senior Mayor (1679–1680)
- Johann Daniel von Stalburg, Senior Mayor (1680–1681)
- Philipp Christian Lersner, Senior Mayor (1681–1682)
- Heinrich Wilhelm Kellner, Senior Mayor (1682–1683)
- Johann Jacob Baur von Eysseneck, Senior Mayor (1683–1684)
- Johann Daniel von Stalburg, Senior Mayor (1683–1684)
- Johann Daniel von Stalburg, Senior Mayor (1684–1685)
- Philipp Wilhelm von Günderrode, Senior Mayor (1684–1685)
- Johann Daniel von Stalburg, Senior Mayor (1685–1686)
- Philipp Ludwig Ort, Senior Mayor (1687–1688)
- Adolf Ernst Humbracht, Senior Mayor (1688–1689)
- Johann Thomas Eberhard gen. Schwind, Senior Mayor (1689–1690)
- Johann Friedericii, Senior Mayor (1690–1691)
- Johann Erasmus Seiffart von Klettenberg, Senior Mayor (1691–1692)
- Heinrich Ludwig Lersner, Senior Mayor (1692–1693)
- Balthasar von Kayb, Senior Mayor (1693–1694)
- Johann Jacob Müller, Senior Mayor (1694–1695)
- Philipp Heinrich Schad, Senior Mayor (1695–1696)
- Johann Hector von Holzhausen, Senior Mayor (1696–1697)
- Johann Adolf von Glauburg, Senior Mayor (1697–1698)
- Philipp Nicolaus Lersner, Senior Mayor (1699–1700)
- Heinrich von Barckhausen, Senior Mayor (1700–1701)

- Stadtschultheißens (de:complete list) –

- Nicolaus Weitz, Stadtschultheißen (1614–1615)
- Johann Martin Baur von Eysseneck, Stadtschultheißen (1616–1634)
- Johann Erasmus Seyffart von Klettenberg und Rhoda, Stadtschultheißen (1696–1716)

- Princely Abbey of Fulda (complete list) –

- Julius Echter von Mespelbrunn, Administrator (1576–1602)
- Johann Friedrich von Schwalbach, Prince-abbot (1606–1622)
- Johann Bernhard Schenk zu Schweinsberg, Prince-abbot (1623–1632)
- Johann Adolf von Hoheneck, Prince-abbot (1633–1635)
- Hermann Georg von Neuhof, Prince-abbot (1635–1644)
- Joachim von Gravenegg, Prince-abbot (1644–1671)
- Bernhard Gustav of Baden-Durlach, Prince-abbot (1671–1677)
- Placidus von Droste, Prince-abbot (1678–1700)
- Adalbert von Schleifras, Prince-abbot (1700–1714)

- Hesse-Butzbach (complete list) –

- Philip III, Landgrave of Hesse-Butzbach (1609–1643)

- Hesse-Braubach (complete list) –

- John, Landgrave (1626–1651)

- Hesse-Darmstadt (complete list) –

- Louis VI the Faithful, Landgrave (1596–1626)
- George II, Landgrave (1626–1661)
- Louis VI, Landgrave (1661–1678)
- Louis VII, Landgrave (1678)
- Elisabeth Dorothea of Saxe-Gotha-Altenburg, Regent (1678–1688)
- Ernest Louis, Landgrave (1678–1739)

- Hesse-Eschwege (complete list) –

- Frederick II, Landgrave (1632–1655)
- Ernest I, Landgrave of Hesse-Rheinfels (1649–1693), of Hesse-Eschwege (1655–1667), of Hesse-Rotenburg (1658–1693)

- Hesse-Homburg (complete list) –

- Frederick I, Landgrave (1622–1638)
- Margaret Elisabeth of Leiningen-Westerburg, Regent (1638–1648)
- William Christoph, Landgrave (1643–1669)
- George Christian, Landgrave (1669–1671)
- Frederick II, Landgrave (1679–1708)

- Hesse-Itter (complete list) –

- George III, Landgrave (1661–1676)

- Hesse-Kassel (complete list) –

- Maurice I the Learned, Landgrave (1592–1627)
- William V the Stable, Landgrave (1627–1637)
- Amalie Elisabeth of Hanau-Münzenberg, Regent (1637–1650)
- William VI, Landgrave (1637–1663)
- Hedwig Sophie of Brandenburg, Regent (1663–1677)
- William VII, Landgrave (1663–1670)
- Charles I, Landgrave (1670–1730)

- Hesse-Marburg –

- Louis IV the Elder, Landgrave (1567–1604)

- Hesse-Philippsthal (complete list) –

- Philip, Landgrave (1663–1721)

- Hesse-Rheinfels (complete list) –

- Ernest I, Landgrave of Hesse-Rheinfels (1649–1693), of Hesse-Eschwege (1655–1667), of Hesse-Rotenburg (1658–1693)

- Hesse-Rotenburg (complete list) –

- Herman IV, Landgrave (1627–1658)
- Ernest I, Landgrave of Hesse-Rheinfels (1649–1693), of Hesse-Eschwege (1655–1667), of Hesse-Rotenburg (1658–1693)
- William the Elder, Landgrave (1693–1725)

- Hesse-Wanfried-Rheinfels (complete list) –

- Charles, Landgrave (1676–1711)

- Isenburg-Birstein (complete list) –

- William Otto, Count (1628–1635)
- Wolfgang Ernest II, Count (1635–1641)
- Christian Maurice, Count (1635–1664)
- John Louis, Count (1641–1664)

- Isenburg-Büdingen (complete list) –

- Wolfgang Ernst I. von Isenburg-Büdingen, Count (1596–1633)
- Johann Ernst I. von Isenburg-Büdingen, Count (1633–1673)
- Johann Casimir von Isenburg und Büdingen, Count (1673–1693)
- Johann Ernst II. von Isenburg und Büdingen, Count (1693–1708)

- Isenburg-Büdingen-Birstein (complete list) –

- Wolfgang Henry, Count (1633–1635)
- Johann Ludwig, Count (1635–1685)
- Wilhelm Moritz I, Count (1685–1711)

- Isenburg-Grenzau (complete list) –

- Salentin VII, Count (1577–1610)
- Salentin VIII, Count (1610–1619)
- Ernest, Count (1619–1664)

- Isenburg-Offenbach (complete list) –

- Wolfgang Henry, Count (1628–1635)
- John Louis, Count (1635–1685)
- John Philip, Count (1685–1711)
- Christian Henry, Count (1685–1711)

- Isenburg-Meerholz (complete list) –

- George Albert, Count (1691–1724)

- Isenburg-Wächtersbach –

- Ferdinand Maximilian I, Count (1673–1703)

- Westerburg-Leiningen-Leiningen (complete list: de) –

- Louis, Count (1597–1622)
- John Casimir, Count (1622–1635)
- John Louis, Count (1635–1665)
- Philipp II, Count of Leiningen-Rixingen (1622–1665), of Leiningen-Leiningen (1665–1668)
- Ludwig Eberhard, Count (1668)
- Philipp Ludwig, Count of Leiningen-Leiningen (1668–1705)

- Leiningen-Dagsburg-Falkenburg –

- Emich X, Count of Leiningen-Dagsburg (1541–1593)
- Johann Ludwig, Count (1593–1625)
- Emich XIII, Count (1625–1658)
- George William, Count (1658–1672)
- Johann, Count (1672–1698)
- Christian Karl Reinhard, Count (1698–1766)

- Leiningen-Oberbronn (de:complete list) –

- Louis Emich, Count (1622–1635)

- Leiningen-Rixingen (de:complete list) –

- Philipp II, Count of Leiningen-Rixingen (1622–1665), of Leiningen-Leiningen (1665–1668)

- Westerburg-Leiningen-Leiningen (complete list: de) –

- Philipp Ludwig, Count of Leiningen-Leiningen (1668–1705)

- Leiningen-Schaumburg (de:complete list) –

- Philipp Jacob, Count (1586–1612)
- Reinhard II, Count (1586–1655)
- Christopher, Count (1586–1635)
- Philipp Ludwig, Count (1635–1637)
- George Wilhelm, Count (1635–1695)
- Johann Anton, Count (1695–1698)
- George Friedrich, Count (1698–1708)

- Leiningen-Westerburg-Altleiningen (de:complete list) –

- Christopher Christian, Count (1695–1728)

- Leiningen-Westerburg-Neuleiningen (de:complete list) –

- George II Karl Ludwig, Count (1695–1726)

- Leiningen-Hardenburg (de:complete list) –

- Emich XII, Count (1562–1607)
- Johann Philipp II, Count (1607–1643)
- Friedrich Emich, Count (1643–1698)
- Emich XIV, Count (?–1684)
- Johann Friedrich, Count (1684–1722)

- Duchy of Lorraine (complete list) –

- Charles III, Duke (1545–1608)
- Henry II, Duke (1608–1624)
- Nicole, Duchess suo jure (1624–1625)
- Francis II, Duke (1625)
- Charles IV, Duke (1625–1634, 1661–1675)
- Nicholas II, Duke (1634–1661)
- Charles V, Duke (1675–1690)
- Leopold, Duke (1690–1729)

- County of Nassau-Saarbrücken (complete list) –

- Philip IV, Count (1574–1602)
- Louis II, Count (1602–1627)
- William Louis, Count (1625/27–1640)
- Crato, Count (1640–1642)
- John Louis, Count (1642–1659)
- Gustav Adolph, Count (1642–1677)
- Louis Crato, Count (1677–1713)

- Nassau-Usingen (complete list) –

- Walrad, Count (1659–1688), Prince (1688–1702)

- Nassau-Weilburg (complete list) –

- Philip IV, Count (1559–1602)
- Louis II, Count (1593–1625)
- William Louis, co-Count (1625–1629), Count of Nassau-Saarbrücken (1629–1640)
- John IV, co-Count (1625–1629), Count of Nassau-Idstein (1629–1677)
- Ernst Casimir, co-Count (1625–1629), Count (1629–1655)
- Frederick, Count (1655–1675)
- John Ernst, Count (1675–1688), Princely count (1688–1719)

- Lower Salm (complete list) –

- Werner, Count (1559–1629)
- Ernst Frederick, Altgrave (1629–1639)

- Salm-Dhaun (complete list) –

- Adolf Henry, Rhinegrave (1574–1606)
- Wolfgang Frederick, Rhinegrave (1606–1638)
- John Louis, Rhinegrave (1638–1673)
- John Philip II, Rhinegrave (1673–1693)
- Charles, Rhinegrave (1693–1733)

- Salm-Hoogstraten (complete list) –

- William Florentin, Rhinegrave (1696–1707)

- Salm-Leuze (complete list) –

- Henry Gabriel, Rhinegrave (1696–1716)

- Salm-Neuweiler (complete list) –

- Frederick I, Rhinegrave (1561–1610)
- Frederick II, Rhinegrave (1610–1673)
- Charles Florentin, Rhinegrave (1673–1676)
- Frederick Charles, Rhinegrave (1676–1696)

- Salm-Püttlingen (complete list) –

- Vollrath Victor, Rhinegrave (1697–1730)

- Salm-Reifferscheid-Bedburg (complete list) –

- Erik Adolf, Altgrave (1639–1673)
- Francis William, Altgrave (1673–1734)

- Salm-Reifferscheid-Dyck (complete list) –

- Ernest Salentin, Altgrave (1639–1684)
- Francis Ernest, Altgrave (1684–1721)

- Salm-Salm (complete list) –

- Friedrich I, Count (1574–1608)
- Philipp Otto, Count of Salm-Salm (1608–1634), Prince of Salm (1623–1634)
- Ludwig, Prince of Salm, Count of Salm-Salm (1634–1636)
- Leopold Philipp Karl, Prince of Salm, Count of Salm-Salm (1636–1663)
- Charles Theodore, Prince of Salm, Count of Salm-Salm (1663–1710)

- Sayn-Wittgenstein-Berleburg (complete list) –

- Georg V, Count (1607–1631)
- Ludwig Casimir, Count (1631–1643)
- Georg Wilhelm, Count (1643–1684)
- Ludwig Franz, Count (1684–1694)
- Casimir, Count (1694–1741)

- Sayn-Wittgenstein-Hohenstein (complete list) –

- Gustav, Count (1657–1701)

- Prince-Bishopric of Sion (complete list) –

- Hildebrand I of Riedmatten, Prince-Bishop (1565–1604)
- Adrien II of Riedmatten, Prince-Bishop (1604–1613)
- Hildebrand II Jost, Prince-Bishop (1613–1638)
- Barthélemy Supersaxo, Prince-Bishop (1638–1640)
- Adrien III of Riedmatten, Prince-Bishop (1640–1646)
- Adrien IV of Riedmatten, Prince-Bishop (1646–1672)
- Adrien V of Riedmatten, Prince-Bishop (1672–1701)

- Solms-Braunfels (complete list) –

- Johann Albrecht I, Count (1592–1623)
- Konrad Ludwig, Count (1623–1635)
- Johann Albrecht II, Count (1635–1647)
- Heinrich Trajectinus, Count (1648–1693)
- Wilhelm Moritz, Count (1693–1720)

- Prince-Bishopric of Speyer (complete list) –

- Eberhard of Dienheim, Prince-bishop (1581–1610)
- Philipp Christoph von Sötern, Prince-bishop (1610–1652)
- Lothar Friedrich of Metternich, Prince-bishop (1652–1675)
- Johann Hugo von Orsbeck, Prince-bishop (1675–1711)

- Prince-Bishopric of Strasbourg (complete list) –

- Johann Georg von Brandenburg, Prince-Bishop (1592–1604)
- Charles of Lorraine, Prince-Bishop (1592/1604–1607)
- Leopold V, Archduke of Austria, Prince-Bishop (1607–1626)
- Leopold William, Archduke of Austria, Prince-Bishop (1626–1662)
- Francis Egon of Fürstenberg, Prince-Bishop (1663–1682)
- Wilhelm Egon von Fürstenberg, Prince-Bishop (1682–1704)

- County of Waldeck-Eisenberg –

- Christian, Count of Waldeck-Eisenberg (1588–1607), of Waldeck-Wildungen (1607–1637)
- Wolrad IV, Count of Waldeck-Eisenberg (1588–1607), Newer Line (1607–1640)
- Philip Dietrich, Count (1640–1645)
- Henry Wolrad, Count (1645–1664)
- Georg Friedrich, Count (1664–1692)

- County of Waldeck-Wildungen/ County of Waldeck and Pyrmont –

- Christian, Count of Waldeck-Eisenberg (1588–1607), of Waldeck-Wildungen (1607–1637)
- Philip VII, Count (1638–1645)
- Josias II, co-Count (1645–1669)
- Christian Louis, Count of Waldeck-Wildungen (1645–1692), of Waldeck and Pyrmont (1692–1706)

- Prince-Bishopric of Worms (complete list) –

- Philipp von Rothenstein, Prince-bishop (1595–1604)
- Philipp II. Kratz von Scharfenstein, Prince-bishop (1604)
- Wilhelm von Essern, Prince-bishop (1604–1616)
- Georg Friedrich von Greiffenklau, Prince-bishop (1616–1629)
- Georg Anton von Rodenstein, Prince-bishop (1629–1652)
- Hugo Eberhard Kratz von Scharfenstein, Prince-bishop (1654–1663)
- Johann Philipp von Schönborn, Prince-bishop (1663–1673)
- Lothar Friedrich von Metternich-Burscheid, Prince-bishop (1673–1675)
- Damian Hartard von der Leyen-Hohengeroldseck, Prince-bishop (1675–1678)
- Karl Heinrich von Metternich-Winneburg, Prince-bishop (1679)
- Franz Emmerich Kaspar von Waldbott von Bassenheim, Prince-bishop (1679–1683)
- Johannes Karl von und zu Franckenstein, Prince-bishop (1683–1691)
- Ludwig Anton von Pfalz-Neuburg, Prince-bishop (1691–1694)
- Count Palatine Francis Louis of Neuburg, Prince-bishop (1694–1732)

== Lower Saxon ==
- Electorate of Saxony, Albertine (complete list) –

- Christian II, Elector (1591–1611), Regent of Saxe-Altenburg (1603–1611)
- John George I, Elector (1611–1656), Regent of Saxe-Altenburg (1611–1618)
- John George II, Elector (1656–1680), Regent of Saxe-Altenburg (1669–1672)
- John George III, Elector (1680–1691)
- John George IV, Elector (1691–1694)
- Augustus II the Strong, Elector (1694–1733), Regent of Saxe-Merseburg (1694–1712)

- Saxe-Lauenburg (complete list) –

- Augustus, co-Vicegerent (1578–1581), co-Administrator (1581–1586), co-Duke (1586–1612)
- Francis II, co-Vicegerent (1578–1581), co-Administrator (1581–1586), co-Duke (1586–1619)
- Augustus, Duke (1619–1656)
- Julius Henry, Duke (1656–1665)
- Francis Erdmann, Duke (1665–1666)
- Julius Francis, Duke (1666–1689)
- George William, occupying Duke (1689–1705)

title then held successively by the monarchs of Britain, Denmark, and Prussia

- Saxe-Merseburg (complete list) –

- Christian I, Duke (1657–1691)
- Christian II, Duke (1691–1694)
- Christian III Maurice, Duke (1694)
- Augustus II the Strong, Elector (1694–1733), Regent of Saxe-Merseburg (1694–1712)
- Erdmuthe Dorothea of Saxe-Zeitz, Regent (1694–1712)
- Maurice William, Duke (1694–1731)

- Saxe-Weissenfels (complete list) –

- Augustus I, Duke (1657–1680)
- Johann Adolf I, Duke (1680–1697)
- Johann Georg, Duke (1697–1712)

- Saxe-Zeitz (complete list) –

- Maurice I, Duke (1657–1681)
- Moritz Wilhelm, Duke (1681–1718)

- Saxe-Zeitz-Pegau-Neustadt (complete list) –

- Frederick Henry, Duke of Saxe-Zeitz-Pegau-Neustadt, Duke (1699–1713)

inherited by the Electorate of Saxony

- Prince-Archbishopric of Bremen (complete list) –

- John Frederick, Prince-archbishop (1596–1634)
- Frederick II, Prince-archbishop (1635–1645)
- Leopold William of Austria, Prince-archbishop (1635–1645)
- Franz Wilhelm, Administrator (1645)
converted into Duchy of Bremen, see Bremen-Verden

- Bremen-Verden (complete list) –

- Christina, Duchess (1648–1654)
- Charles X Gustav, Duke (1654–1660)
- Charles XI, Duke (1660–1697)
- Charles XII, Duke (1697–1718)

- Free City of Bremen (complete list) –

- Mayors Heinrich Lampe I (1745–1756)

- Principality of Brunswick-Wolfenbüttel/ Principality of Wolfenbüttel (complete list) –

- Henry Julius, Prince of Wolfenbüttel, of Calenberg (1589–1613), of Grubenhagen (1596–1613)
- Frederick Ulrich, Prince of Brunswick-Wolfenbüttel, of Calenberg (1613–1634), of Calenberg (1613–1617)
- Augustus the Younger, Prince (1635–1666)
- Rudolf Augustus, Prince (1666–1704)
- Anthony Ulrich, Prince (1685–1702, 1704–1714)

- Principality of Calenberg (complete list) –

- Henry Julius, Prince of Wolfenbüttel, of Calenberg (1589–1613), of Grubenhagen (1596–1613)
- Frederick Ulrich, Prince of Brunswick-Wolfenbüttel, of Calenberg (1613–1634), of Calenberg (1613–1617)
- George, Prince (1635–1641)
- Christian Louis, Prince of Calenberg (1641–1648), of Lüneburg (1648–1665)
- George William, Prince of Calenberg (1648–1665), of Lüneburg (1658–1705)
- John Frederick, Prince (1665–1679)
- Ernest Augustus, Prince (1679–1698), Elector-designate (1692–1698)

- Gandersheim Abbey (complete list) –

- Anna Erica, Princess-Abbess (1589–1611)
- Dorothea Augusta, Princess-Abbess (1611–1626)
- Catharina Elisabeth, Princess-Abbess (?)
- Maria Sabina, Princess-Abbess (1650–1665)
- Dorothea Hedwig, Princess-Abbess (1665–1678)
- Christine Sophie, Princess-Abbess (1678–1681)
- Christina II, Princess-Abbess (1681–1693)
- Henriette Christine, Princess-Abbess (1693–1712)

- Electorate of Hanover (Brunswick-Lüneburg) (complete list) –

- Ernest Augustus, Prince (1679–1698), Elector-designate (1692–1698)
- George I, Elector-designate (1698–1708), Elector (1708–1727)

- Free City of Hamburg (complete list) –

- Eberhard Twestreng, Mayor (1606)
- Hieronimus Vögeler, Mayor (1609)
- Mayorship unoccupied (1613–1614), Hieronymus Vögeler, Second Mayor (1609–1642)
- Sebastian von Bergen, Mayor (1614–1623)
- Johann Wetken:, Mayor (1614)
- Bartholomäus Beckmann, Mayor (1617)
- Joachim Claen, Mayor (1622)
- Albert von Eitzen, Mayor (1623)
- unoccupied, Mayor (1623–1624)
- Ulrich Winkel, Mayor (1624–1649)
- Johannes Brand, Mayor (1633–1652)
- Bartholomäus Moller, Mayor (1643)
- Mayorship unoccupied (1649–1650), Bartholomäus Moller, Second Mayor (1643–1667)
- Nicolaus Jarre, Mayor (1650–1678)
- Johann Schlebusch, Mayor (1653)
- Peter Lütkens, Mayor (1654)
- Wolfgang Meurer, Mayor (1660)
- Bartholomäus Twestreng, Mayor (1663)
- Johannes Schötteringk, Mayor (1667)
- Johann Schulte, Mayor (1668)
- Bruderus Pauli, Mayor (1670–1680)
- Johann Schröder, Mayor (1676)
- Heinrich Meurer, Mayor (1678–1684)
- Diedrich Moller, Mayor (1680)
- Johann Schlüter, Mayor (1684–1688)
- Joachim Lemmermann, Mayor (1684)
- Heinrich Meurer, Mayor (1686)
- Peter Lütkens, Mayor (1687–1717)
- Johannes Schafshausen, Mayor (1690–1697)
- Hieronimus Harticus Moller, Mayor (1697)
- Peter von Lengerke (or Lengerks), Mayor (1697–1709)

- Prince-Bishopric of Hildesheim (complete list) –

- Ernest II of Bavaria, Prince-bishop (1573–1612)
- Ferdinand of Bavaria, Administrator (1612–1650)
- Maximilian Henry of Bavaria, Prince-bishop (1650–1688)
- Jobst Edmund von Brabeck, Prince-bishop (1688–1702)

- Holstein-Glückstadt

- Dukes (complete list) –

- Christian IV, Duke (1588–1648)
- Frederick III, Duke (1648–1670)
- Christian V, Duke (1670–1699)
- Frederick IV, Duke (1699–1730)
- Christian VII, Duke of Holstein-Glückstadt (1766–1773), of Holstein (1773–1808)

- Statholders (complete list) –

- Geerd Rantzau, Statholder (1600–1627)
- Prince Frederick of Denmark, Statholder (1647–1648)
- Christian zu Rantzau, Statholder (1648–1663)
- Friedrich von Ahlefeldt, Statholder (1663–1685)
- Detlev zu Rantzau, Statholder (1685–1697)
- Friedrich von Ahlefeldt, Statholder (1697–1708)

- Holstein-Gottorp (complete list) –

- John Adolf, Duke (1590–1616)
- Frederick III, Duke (1616–1659)
- Christian Albert, Duke (1659–1694)
- Frederick IV, Duke (1694–1702)

- Holstein-Pinneberg (Holstein-Schaumburg) (complete list) –

- Adolf XI, Count (1576–1601)
- Ernest, Count (1601–1622)
- Jobst Herman, Count (1622–1635)
- Otto V, Count (1635–1640)

- Prince-bishopric of Lübeck (complete list) –

- John Adolf, Duke of Holstein-Gottorp, Prince-bishop (1586–1607)
- John Frederick of Holstein-Gottorp, Prince-bishop (1607–1634)
- John X of Schleswig-Holstein-Gottorp, Prince-bishop (1634–1655)
- Christian Albert, Duke of Holstein-Gottorp, Prince-bishop (1655–1666)
- August Frederick of Holstein-Gottorp, Prince-bishop (1666–1705)

- Free City of Lübeck (complete list) –

- Jakob Bording, Mayor (1600–1616)
- Conrad Garmers, Mayor (1601–1612)
- Heinrich Brokes, Mayor (1609–1623)
- Johann Vinhagen, Mayor (1619–1630)
- Lorenz Möller, Mayor (1612–1634)
- Mattheus Kossen, Mayor (1616–1620)
- Heinrich Köhler (politician, born 1576), Mayor (1624–1641)
- Christoph Gerdes, Mayor (1627–1661)
- Johann Kampferbeke, Mayor (1634–1639)
- Heinrich Wedemhof, Mayor (1630–1651)
- Otto Brokes, Mayor (1640–1652)
- Hermann von Dorne, Mayor (1651–1665)
- Gotthard von Höveln, Mayor (1654–1669)
- Anton Köhler, Mayor (1642–1657)
- Gottschalk von Wickede, Mayor (1659–1667)
- Johann Marquard, Mayor (1663–1668)
- Matthäus Rodde, Mayor (1667–1677)
- Heinrich Kerkring, Mayor (1671–1693)
- Johann Ritter, Mayor (1669–1700)
- Konrad Schinkel, Mayor (1680–1682)
- David Gloxin, Mayor (1666–1671)
- Johann Siricius, Mayor (1687–1696)
- Bernhard Diedrich Brauer, Mayor (1669–1686)
- Bernhard Frese, Mayor (1685–1688)
- Gotthard Marquard, Mayor (1692–1694)
- Anton Winckler, Mayor (1694–1707)
- Hieronymus von Dorne, Mayor (1695–1704)
- Gotthard Kerkring, Mayor (1697–1705)

- Principality of Lüneburg (complete list) –

- Ernest II, Prince (1592–1611)
- Christian, Prince of Lüneburg (1611–1633), of Grubenhagen (1617)
- Augustus the Elder, Prince (1633–1636)
- Frederick IV, Prince (1636–1648)
- Christian Louis, Prince of Calenberg (1641–1648), of Lüneburg (1648–1665)
- George William, Prince of Calenberg (1648–1665), of Lüneburg (1658–1705)

- Prince-Archbishopric of Magdeburg and of Halberstadt (complete list) –

- Christian William of Brandenburg, Prince-archbishop (1598–1631)
- Leopold William of Austria, Administrator (1631–1638)
- Augustus, Duke of Saxe-Weissenfels, Prince-archbishop (1638–1680)

secularised into the Duchy of Magdeburg

- Duchy of Mecklenburg-Güstrow (complete list) –

- Ulrich I, Duke (1555–1603)
- Charles I, Duke of Mecklenburg-Güstrow (1603–1610), Regent of Mecklenburg-Schwerin (1608–1610)
- Adolf Frederick I, co-Duke of Mecklenburg-Schwerin (1592–1621), -Güstrow (1610–1621), Duke of Mecklenburg-Schwerin (1621–1628, 1631–1658)
- John Albert II, co-Duke of Mecklenburg-Schwerin (1592–1621), -Güstrow (1610–1621), Duke of Mecklenburg-Güstrow (1621–1628, 1631–1636)

Albrecht von Wallenstein, military leader (1628–1631)

- Gustav Adolph I, Duke (1636–1695)

inherited by Mecklenburg-Schwerin to unite Mecklenburg

- Duchy of Mecklenburg-Schwerin (complete list) –

- John Albert II, co-Duke of Mecklenburg-Schwerin (1592–1621), -Güstrow (1610–1621), Duke of Mecklenburg-Güstrow (1621–1628, 1631–1636)
- Adolf Frederick I, co-Duke of Mecklenburg-Schwerin (1592–1621), -Güstrow (1610–1621), Duke of Mecklenburg-Schwerin (1621–1628, 1631–1658)

Albrecht von Wallenstein, military leader (1628–1631)

- Christian Louis I, Duke (1658–1692)
- Frederick William I, Duke of Mecklenburg-Schwerin (1692–1695, 1701–1713), Duke of Mecklenburg (1695–1701)

- Mecklenburg (complete list) –

- Frederick William I, Duke of Mecklenburg-Schwerin (1692–1695, 1701–1713), Duke of Mecklenburg (1695–1701)

- County of Oldenburg (complete list) –

- John VII, Count (1573–1603)
- Anthony II, Count (1573–1619)
- Anthony Günther, Count (1603–1667)
- Frederick I, Count (1667–1670)
- Christian VIII, Count (1670–1699)
- Frederick II, Count (1699–1730)

- County of Rantzau –

- Christian of Rantzau, Count (1653/54–1663)
- Detlev of Rantzau, Count (1663–1697)
- Christian Detlev of Rantzau, Count (1697–1721)

== Upper Saxon ==
- Principality of Anhalt (complete list) –

- John Ernest, co-Prince of Anhalt (1586–1601)
- John George I, co-Prince of Anhalt (1586–1603), of Anhalt-Dessau (1603–1618)
- Rudolph II, co-Prince of Anhalt (1586–1603), of Anhalt-Zerbst (1603–1621)
- Christian I, co-Prince of Anhalt (1586–1603), of Anhalt-Bernburg (1603–1630)
- Louis I, co-Prince of Anhalt (1586–1603), of Anhalt-Köthen (1603–1650)
- Augustus, co-Prince of Anhalt (1586–1603), of Anhalt-Plötzkau (1603–1653), Regent of Anhalt-Zerbst (1621–1642), of Anhalt-Köthen (1650–1653)

- Anhalt-Bernburg (complete list) –

- Christian I, co-Prince of Anhalt (1586–1603), of Anhalt-Bernburg (1603–1630)
- Christian II, Prince (1630–1656)
- Victor Amadeus, Prince (1656–1718)

- Anhalt-Dessau (complete list) –

- John George I, co-Prince of Anhalt (1586–1603), of Anhalt-Dessau (1603–1618)
- John Casimir, Prince (1618–1660)
- John George II, Prince of Anhalt-Dessau (1660–1693), Regent of Anhalt-Köthen (1690–1692)
- Henriette Catherine of Nassau, Regent of Anhalt-Dessau (1693–1698)
- Leopold I, Prince (1693–1747)

- Anhalt-Dornburg (complete list) –

- John Louis I, Prince (1667–1704)

- Anhalt-Köthen (complete list) –

- Louis I, co-Prince of Anhalt (1586–1603), of Anhalt-Köthen (1603–1650)
- Augustus, co-Prince of Anhalt (1586–1603), of Anhalt-Plötzkau (1603–1653), Regent of Anhalt-Zerbst (1621–1642), of Anhalt-Köthen (1650–1653)
- William Louis, Prince (1650–1665)
- Lebrecht, co-Regent of Anhalt-Köthen (1653–1659), co-Prince of Anhalt-Plötzkau (1653–1665), of Anhalt-Köthen (1665–1669)
- Emmanuel, co-Regent of Anhalt-Köthen (1653–1659), co-Prince of Anhalt-Plötzkau (1653–1665), of Anhalt-Köthen (1665–1670)
- Anna Eleonore of Stolberg-Wernigerode, Regent of Anhalt-Köthen (1670–1690)
- John George II, Prince of Anhalt-Dessau (1660–1693), Regent of Anhalt-Köthen (1690–1692)
- Emmanuel Lebrecht, Prince (1671–1704)

- Anhalt-Plötzkau (complete list) –

- Augustus, co-Prince of Anhalt (1586–1603), of Anhalt-Plötzkau (1603–1653), Regent of Anhalt-Zerbst (1621–1642), of Anhalt-Köthen (1650–1653)
- Ernest Gottlieb, Prince of Anhalt-Plötzkau (1653–1654)
- Lebrecht, co-Regent of Anhalt-Köthen (1653–1659), co-Prince of Anhalt-Plötzkau (1653–1665), of Anhalt-Köthen (1665–1669)
- Emmanuel, co-Regent of Anhalt-Köthen (1653–1659), co-Prince of Anhalt-Plötzkau (1653–1665), of Anhalt-Köthen (1665–1670)

- Anhalt-Zerbst (complete list) –

- Rudolph II, co-Prince of Anhalt (1586–1603), of Anhalt-Zerbst (1603–1621)
- Augustus, co-Prince of Anhalt (1586–1603), of Anhalt-Plötzkau (1603–1653), Regent of Anhalt-Zerbst (1621–1642), of Anhalt-Köthen (1650–1653)
- John VI, Prince (1621–1667)
- Sophie Augusta of Holstein-Gottorp, Regent (1667–1674)
- Charles, Prince (1667–1718)

- Electorate of Brandenburg (complete list) –

- Joachim Frederick, Elector (1598–1608)
- John Sigismund, Elector of Brandenburg (1608–1619), Duke of Prussia (1618–1619)

- Brandenburg-Prussia: Electorate of Brandenburg and Duchy of Prussia (complete list, complete list) –

- John Sigismund, Elector of Brandenburg (1608–1619), Duke of Prussia (1618–1619)
- George William, Elector, Duke (1619–1640)
- Frederick William, Elector (1640–1688)
- Frederick I, Elector (1688–1713), Duke (1688–1701), King (1701–1713)

- Pomerania-Wolgast (complete list) –

- Philip Julius, Duke of Pomerania-Wolgast (1592–1625)

then inherited by Bogislaw XIV the Sociable to unite Pomerania

- Pomerania-Stettin, Duchy of Pomerania, Pomerania-Barth (complete list) –

- Barnim X the Younger, co-Duke of Pomerania-Wolgast (1560–1569), Duke of Pomerania-Rügenwalde (1569–1603), of Pomerania-Stettin (1600–1603)
- Bogislaw XIII, co-Duke of Pomerania-Wolgast (1560–1569), co-Duke of Pomerania-Barth (1569–1603), of Pomerania-Stettin (1603–1606)
- Philip II the Pious, Duke of Pomerania-Stettin (1606–1618)
- Francis, Duke of Pomerania-Barth (1606–1620), of Pomerania-Stettin (1618–1620)
- Bogislaw XII the Sociable, Duke of Pomerania-Rügenwalde (1617–1625), of Pomerania-Stettin (1620–1625), of Pomerania (1625–1637)

- Pomerania-Rügenwalde, Duchy of Pomerania (complete list) –

- Barnim X the Younger, co-Duke of Pomerania-Wolgast (1560–1569), Duke of Pomerania-Rügenwalde (1569–1603), of Pomerania-Stettin (1600–1603)
- George II, Duke of Pomerania-Rügenwalde (1603–1617)
- Bogislaw XII the Sociable, Duke of Pomerania-Rügenwalde (1617–1625), of Pomerania-Stettin (1620–1625), of Pomerania (1625–1637)

- Reuss-Ebersdorf (complete list) –

- Heinrich X, Count (1678–1711)

- Reuss-Lobenstein (complete list) –

- Henry X, Lord (1647–1671)
- Heinrich V, Lord (1671–1672)
- Heinrich VIII, Lord (1671–1673), Count (1673–1678)
- Heinrich X, Lord (1673–1678), Count (1678–1678)
- Heinrich III, Lord (1671–1673), co-Count (1673–1678), Count (1678–1710)
- Heinrich VIII, co-Count (1673–1678), of Reuss-Hirschberg (1678–?)
- Heinrich X, co-Count (1673–1678), of Reuss-Ebersdorf (1678–?)

- Saxe-Weimar (complete list) –

- Friedrich Wilhelm I, Duke (1573–1602)
- Johann II, Duke (1602–1605)
- John Ernest I, Duke (1605–1620)
- William I, Duke of Saxe-Weimar (1620–1644), of Saxe-Weimar-Eisenach (1644–1662)
- John Ernest II, Duke of Saxe-Weimar (1662–1683), Regent of Saxe-Jena (1678–1683)
- Johann Ernest III, co-Duke (1683–1707)
- William Ernest, Duke of Saxe-Weimar (1683–1728), Regent of Saxe-Jena (1686–1690)

- Saxe-Coburg (complete list) –

- John Casimir, co-Duke of Saxe-Coburg-Eisenach (1572–1596), Duke of Saxe-Coburg (1596–1633)

- Saxe-Eisenach (complete list) –

- John Ernest I, co-Duke of Saxe-Coburg-Eisenach (1572–1596), Duke of Saxe-Eisenach (1596–1633), of Saxe-Coburg-Eisenach (1633–1638)

- Saxe-Coburg-Eisenach (complete list) –

- John Ernest I, co-Duke of Saxe-Coburg-Eisenach (1572–1596), Duke of Saxe-Eisenach (1596–1633), of Saxe-Coburg-Eisenach (1633–1638)

- Saxe-Altenburg (complete list) –

- Christian II, Elector (1591–1611), Regent of Saxe-Altenburg (1603–1611)
- John George I, Elector (1611–1656), Regent of Saxe-Altenburg (1611–1618)
- Johann Philipp, Duke (1603–1639)
- Friedrich Wilhelm II, Duke (1639–1669)
- John George II, Elector (1656–1680), Regent of Saxe-Altenburg (1669–1672)
- Frederick William III, Duke (1669–1672)

inherited by Saxe-Gotha to form Saxe-Gotha-Altenburg

- Saxe-Eisenach (complete list) –

- Albert IV, Duke (1640–1644)
- William I, Duke of Saxe-Weimar (1620–1644), of Saxe-Weimar-Eisenach (1644–1662)
- Adolf William, Duke (1662–1668)
- William August, Duke (1668–1671)
- John George I, Duke of Saxe-Marksuhl (1662–1686), of Saxe-Eisenach (1671–1686), Regent of Saxe-Eisenach (1668–1671), of Saxe-Jena (1683–1686)
- John George II, Duke (1686–1698)
- John William III, Duke (1698–1729)

- Saxe-Jena (complete list) –

- Bernard, Duke (1672–1678)
- John Ernest II, Duke of Saxe-Weimar (1662–1683), Regent of Saxe-Jena (1678–1683)
- John George I, Duke of Saxe-Marksuhl (1662–1686), of Saxe-Eisenach (1671–1686), Regent of Saxe-Jena (1683–1686), of Saxe-Eisenach (1668–1671)
- William Ernest, Duke of Saxe-Weimar (1683–1728), Regent of Saxe-Jena (1686–1690)
- Johann Wilhelm, Duke (1678–1690)

divided between Saxe-Weimar and Saxe-Eisenach

- Saxe-Marksuhl (complete list) –

- John George I, Duke of Saxe-Marksuhl (1662–1686), of Saxe-Eisenach (1671–1686), Regent of Saxe-Eisenach (1668–1671), of Saxe-Jena (1683–1686)

reincorporated into Saxe-Eisenach

- Saxe-Weimar (complete list) –

- Johann Ernest III, co-Duke (1683–1707)
- William Ernest, Duke of Saxe-Weimar (1683–1728), Regent of Saxe-Jena (1686–1690)

- Saxe-Gotha, Saxe-Gotha-Altenburg (complete list, complete list) –

- Ernest I the Pious, Duke of Saxe-Gotha (1640–1672), of Saxe-Gotha-Altenburg (1672–1675)
- Frederick I, Duke of Saxe-Gotha-Altenburg, co-Duke (1675–1680), Duke (1680–1691)
- Albert V, co-Duke of Saxe-Gotha-Altenburg (1675–1680), Duke of Saxe-Coburg (1680–1699)
- Bernhard I, co-Duke of Saxe-Gotha-Altenburg (1675–1680), Duke of Saxe-Meiningen (1680–1706)
- Christian, co-Duke of Saxe-Gotha-Altenburg (1675–1680), Duke of Saxe-Eisenberg (1680–1707)
- Henry, co-Duke of Saxe-Gotha-Altenburg (1675–1680), Duke of Saxe-Römhild (1680–1710)
- Ernest, co-Duke of Saxe-Gotha-Altenburg (1675–1680), Duke of Saxe-Hildburghausen (1680–1715)
- John Ernest IV, co-Duke of Saxe-Gotha-Altenburg (1675–1680), Duke of Saxe-Saalfeld (1680–1699), of Saxe-Coburg-Saalfeld (1699–1729)
- Frederick II, Duke (1691–1732)

- Saxe-Coburg (complete list) –

- Albert V, co-Duke of Saxe-Gotha-Altenburg (1675–1680), Duke of Saxe-Coburg (1680–1699)

inherited by Saxe-Saalfeld to form Saxe-Coburg-Saalfeld

- Saxe-Meiningen (complete list) –

- Bernhard I, co-Duke of Saxe-Gotha-Altenburg (1675–1680), Duke of Saxe-Meiningen (1680–1706)

- Saxe-Eisenberg (complete list) –

- Christian, co-Duke of Saxe-Gotha-Altenburg (1675–1680), Duke of Saxe-Eisenberg (1680–1707)

- Saxe-Römhild (complete list) –

- Henry, co-Duke of Saxe-Gotha-Altenburg (1675–1680), Duke of Saxe-Römhild (1680–1710)

- Saxe-Hildburghausen/ Saxe-Altenburg (complete list) –

- Ernest, co-Duke of Saxe-Gotha-Altenburg (1675–1680), Duke of Saxe-Hildburghausen (1680–1715)

- Saxe-Saalfeld, Saxe-Coburg-Saalfeld (complete list, complete list) –

- John Ernest IV, co-Duke of Saxe-Gotha-Altenburg (1675–1680), Duke of Saxe-Saalfeld (1680–1699), of Saxe-Coburg-Saalfeld (1699–1729)

- Schwarzburg-Rudolstadt (complete list) –

- Albrecht VII, Count (1574–1605)
- Charles Günther I, Count (1605–1630)
- Albrecht Günther, Count (1612–1634)
- Louis Günther I, Count (1630–1646)
- Emilie of Oldenburg-Delmenhorst, Regent (1646–1662)
- Albert Anton, Count (1646–1710)

- Schwarzburg-Sondershausen (complete list) –

- John Günther II, co-Count (1586–1631)
- Anton Henry, co-Count (1586–1638)
- Christian Günther I, co-Count (1586–1642)
- Günther XLII, co-Count (1586–1643)
- Anton Günther I, co-Count (1642–1666)
- Anton Günther II, co-Count (1666–1697), co-Prince (1697–1716)
- Christian William, co-Count (1666–1697), co-Prince (1697–1721)

- County of Stolberg (de:complete list) –

- Johann zu Stolberg, Count (1549–1612)
- Heinrich XI. zu Stolberg-Stolberg, Count (1551–1615)
- Wolfgang Georg zu Stolberg-Stolberg, Count (1582–1631)
- Johann Martin, Count (1594–1669)
- Friedrich Wilhelm, Count (1639–1684)
- Christoph Ludwig I, Count (1634–1704)

- Stolberg-Wernigerode (complete list) –

- Henry Ernest, Count (1645–1672)
- Ernest, Count (1672–1710)

== Swabian ==
- Prince-Bishopric of Augsburg (complete list) –

- Heinrich von Knöringen, Prince-bishop (1599–1646)
- Sigismund Francis, Prince-bishop (1646–1665)
- Johann Christoph von Freyberg-Allmendingen, Prince-bishop (1666–1690)
- Alexander Sigismund von der Pfalz-Neuburg, Prince-bishop (1690–1737)

- Margraviate of Baden-Rodemachern (complete list) –

- Philip IV, Margrave (1588–1620)
- Herman Fortunatus, Margrave (1620–1665)
- Charles William, Margrave (1665–1666)

- Margraviate of Baden-Baden/ Margraviate of Baden-Sausenberg (complete list) –

- Ernest Frederick, Margrave of Baden-Durlach (1577–1604), of Baden-Baden (1594–1604)
- Georg Friedrich, Margrave of Baden-Sausenburg (1577–1604), of Baden-Baden (1604–1621), of Baden-Durlach (1604–1638)
- William, Margrave (1621–1677)
- Louis William the Turkish, Margrave (1677–1707)

- Margraviate of Baden-Durlach (complete list) –

- Ernest Frederick, Margrave of Baden-Durlach (1577–1604), of Baden-Baden (1594–1604)
- Georg Friedrich, Margrave of Baden-Sausenburg (1577–1604), of Baden-Baden (1604–1621), of Baden-Durlach (1604–1638)
- Frederick V the Kinsman, Margrave (1638–1659)
- Frederick VI the Turkish, Margrave (1659–1677)
- Frederick VII Magnus, Margrave (1677–1709)

- Prince-Bishopric of Constance (complete list) –

- Johann Georg von Hallwyl, Prince-bishop (1601–1604)
- Jakob Fugger (bishop), Prince-bishop (1604–1626)
- Werner von Praßberg, Prince-bishop (1626–1627)
- Johann von Waldburg, Prince-bishop (1627–1644)
- Franz Johann von Vogt von Altensumerau und Prasberg, Prince-bishop (1645–1689)
- Marquard Rudolf von Rodt, Prince-bishop (1689–1704)

- Prince-Provostry of Ellwangen (complete list) –

- Wolfgang of Hausen, Prince-provost (1584–1603)
- Johann Christoph I of Westerstetten, Prince-provost (1603–1613)
- Johann Christoph II of Freyberg-Eisenberg, Prince-provost (1613–1620)
- Johann Jakob Blarer of Wartensee, Prince-provost (1621–1654)
- Johann Rudolf of Rechberg, Prince-provost (1654–1660)
- Johann Christoph von Freyberg-Allmendingen, Prince-provost (1660–1674)
- Johann Christoph IV, Prince-provost (1674–1687)
- Heinrich Christoph of Wolframsdorf, Prince-provost (1687–1689)
- Ludwig Anton von Pfalz-Neuburg, Prince-provost (1689–1694)
- Francis Louis, Prince-provost (1694–1732)

- Gutenzell Abbey (de:complete list) –

- Maria Segesser von Brunegg, Princess-abbess (1567–1610)
- Anna Segesser von Brunegg, Princess-abbess (1610–1630)
- Maria Barbara Thumb von Neuburg, Princess-abbess (1630–1663)
- Maria Franziska von Freyberg, Princess-abbess (1663–1696)
- Maria Victoria Hochwind, Princess-abbess (1696–1718)

- Hohenzollern-Hechingen (complete list) –

- Eitel Friedrich IV, Count (1576–1605)
- Johann Georg, Count (1605–1623), Prince (1623)
- Eitel Friedrich V, Prince (1601–1661)
- Philipp Christoph Friedrich, Prince (1661–1671)
- Friedrich Wilhelm, Prince (1671–1735)

- Hohenzollern-Sigmaringen (complete list) –

- Charles II, Count (1576–1606)
- Johann, Count (1606–1623), Prince (1623–1638)
- Meinrad I, Prince (1638–1681)
- Maximilian, Prince (1681–1689)
- Meinrad II, Prince (1689–1715)

- Princely Abbey of Kempten (complete list) –

- Johann Adam Renner of Allmendingen, Prince-abbot (1594–1607)
- Henry VIII of Ulm -Langenrhein, Prince-abbot (1607–1616)
- Johann Eucharius of Wolffurt, Prince-abbot (1616–1631)
- Johann Willibald Schenk of Castell, Prince-abbot (1631–1639)
- de:Roman Giel von Gielsberg, Prince-abbot (1639–1673)
- de:Bernhard Gustav von Baden-Durlach, Prince-abbot (1673–1677)
- de:Rupert von Bodman, Prince-abbot (1678–1728)

- Königsegg (complete list) –

- Marquard IV, Baron (1567–1626)
- George II, Baron (1567–1622)
- John William, Baron (1626–1663)

- Königsegg-Aulendorf (complete list) –

- John George, Baron (1622–1629), Count (1629–1666)
- Anthony Eusebius, Count (1666–1692)
- Francis Maximilian, Count (1692–1710)

- Königsegg-Rothenfels (complete list) –

- Hugh, Baron (1622–1629), Count (1629–1666)
- Leopold William, Count (1666–1694)
- Sigmund William, Count (1694–1709)

- Lindau Abbey (de:complete list) –

- Barbara von der Breiten-Landenberg, Princess-abbess (1578–1614)
- Susanna von Bubenhofen, Princess-abbess (1614–1634)
- Anna Christiane Hundbiss von Waltrams, Princess-abbess (1634–1676)
- Maria Rosina Brymsin von Herblingen, Princess-abbess (1676–1689)
- Maria Magdalena von Hallwyl, Princess-abbess (1689–1720)

- Oettingen-Wallerstein (complete list) –

- Wilhelm II, Count (1579–1602)
- Ernst II, Count (1602–1670)
- Wilhelm IV, Count (1670–1692)
- Wolfgang IV, Count (1692–1708)

- Stadion (complete list) –

- John Philip, Lord (1666–1686), Baron (1686–1705), Count (1705–1741)

- Weingarten Abbey (complete list) –

- Georg Wegelin, Prince-abbot (1586–1627)
- Franz Dietrich, Prince-abbot (1627–1637)
- Domenicus I Laumann von Liebenau, Prince-abbot (1637–1673)
- Alfons von Stadelmayer, Prince-abbot (1673–1683)
- Willibald Kobold, Prince-abbot (1683–1697)
- Sebastian Hyller, Prince-abbot (1697–1730)

- Duchy of Württemberg (complete list) –

- Frederick I, Duke of Württemberg, Duke (1593–1608)
- John Frederick, Duke of Württemberg, Duke (1608–1628)
- Eberhard III, Duke of Württemberg, Duke (1628–1674)
- William Louis, Duke of Württemberg, Duke (1674–1677)
- Eberhard Louis, Duke of Württemberg, Duke (1677–1733)

== Italy ==
- Republic of Genoa (complete list) –

- Lorenzo Sauli, Doge (1599–1601)
- Agostino Doria, Doge (1601–1603)
- Pietro De Franchi Sacco, Doge (1603–1605)
- Luca Grimaldi De Castro, Doge (1605–1607)
- Silvestro Invrea, Doge (1607)
- Gerolamo Assereto, Doge (1607–1609)
- Agostino Pinelli Luciani, Doge (1609–1611)
- Alessandro Giustiniani Longo, Doge (1611–1613)
- Tomaso Spinola, Doge (1613–1615)
- Bernardo Clavarezza, Doge (1615–1617)
- Giovanni Giacomo Imperiale Tartaro, Doge (1617–1619)
- Pietro Durazzo, Doge (1619–1621)
- Ambrogio Doria, Doge (1621)
- Giorgio Centurione, Doge (1621–1623)
- Federico De Franchi Toso, Doge (1623–1625)
- Giacomo Lomellini, Doge (1625–1627)
- Giovanni Luca Chiavari, Doge (1627–1629)
- Andrea Spinola, Doge (1629–1631)
- Leonardo Della Torre, Doge (1631–1633)
- Giovanni Stefano Doria, Doge (1633–1635)
- Giovanni Francesco I Brignole Sale, Doge (1635–1637)
- Agostino Pallavicini, Doge (1637–1639)
- Giovanni Battista Durazzo, Doge (1639–1641)
- Giovanni Agostino De Marini, Doge (1641–1642)
- Giovanni Battista Lercari, Doge (1642–1644)
- Luca Giustiniani, Doge (1644–1646)
- Giovanni Battista Lomellini, Doge (1646–1648)
- Giacomo De Franchi Toso, Doge (1648–1650)
- Agostino Centurione, Doge (1650–1652)
- Gerolamo De Franchi Toso, Doge (1652–1654)
- Alessandro Spinola, Doge (1654–1656)
- Giulio Sauli, Doge (1656–1658)
- Giovanni Battista Centurione, Doge (1658–1660)
- Gian Bernardo Frugoni, Doge (1660–1661)
- Antoniotto Invrea, Doge (1661–1663)
- Stefano De Mari, Doge (1663–1665)
- Cesare Durazzo, Doge (1665–1667)
- Cesare Gentile, Doge (1667–1669)
- Francesco Garbarino, Doge (1669–1671)
- Alessandro Grimaldi, Doge (1671–1673)
- Agostino Saluzzo, Doge (1673–1675)
- Antonio Da Passano, Doge (1675–1677)
- Giannettino Odone, Doge (1677–1679)
- Agostino Spinola, Doge (1679–1681)
- Luca Maria Invrea, Doge (1681–1683)
- Francesco Maria Imperiale Lercari, Doge (1683–1685)
- Pietro Durazzo, Doge (1685–1687)
- Luca Spinola, Doge (1687–1689)
- Oberto Della Torre, Doge (1689–1691)
- Giovanni Battista Cattaneo Della Volta, Doge (1691–1693)
- Francesco Invrea, Doge (1693–1695)
- Bendinelli Negrone, Doge (1695–1697)
- Francesco Maria Sauli, Doge (1697–1699)
- Girolamo De Mari, Doge (1699–1701)

- Duchy of Milan (complete list) –

- Philip II, Duke (1598–1621)
- Philip III, Duke (1621–1665)
- Charles I, Duke (1665–1700)
- Philip IV, Duke (1700–1714)

- Duchy of Modena (complete list) –

- Cesare, Duke (1597–1628)
- Alfonso III, Duke (1628–1629)
- Francesco I, Duke (1629–1658)
- Alfonso IV, Duke (1658–1662)
- Francesco II, Duke (1662–1694)
- Rinaldo, Duke (1695–1737)

- Principality of Orange (complete list) –

- Philip William, Prince (1584–1618)
- Maurice, Prince (1618–1625)
- Frederick Henry, Prince (1625–1647)
- William II, Prince (1647–1650)
- William III, Prince (1650–1702)

- Papal States (complete list) –

- Clement VIII, Pope (1592–1605)
- Leo XI, Pope (1605)
- Paul V, Pope (1605–1621)
- Gregory XV, Pope (1621–1623)
- Urban VIII, Pope (1623–1644)
- Innocent X, Pope (1644–1655)
- Alexander VII, Pope (1655–1667)
- Clement IX, Pope (1667–1669)
- Clement X, Pope (1670–1676)
- Innocent XI, Pope (1676–1689)
- Alexander VIII, Pope (1689–1691)
- Innocent XII, Pope (1691–1700)
- Clement XI, Pope (1700–1721)

- Duchy of Savoy (complete list) –

- Charles Emmanuel I, Duke (1580–1630)
- Victor Amadeus I, Duke (1630–1637)
- Francis Hyacinth, Duke (1637–1638)
- Charles Emmanuel II, Duke (1638–1675)
- Victor Amadeus II, Duke (1675–1730)
