= Damian Hartard von der Leyen-Hohengeroldseck =

German Prince-Bishop and nobleman

- Archbishop-Elector of Mainz
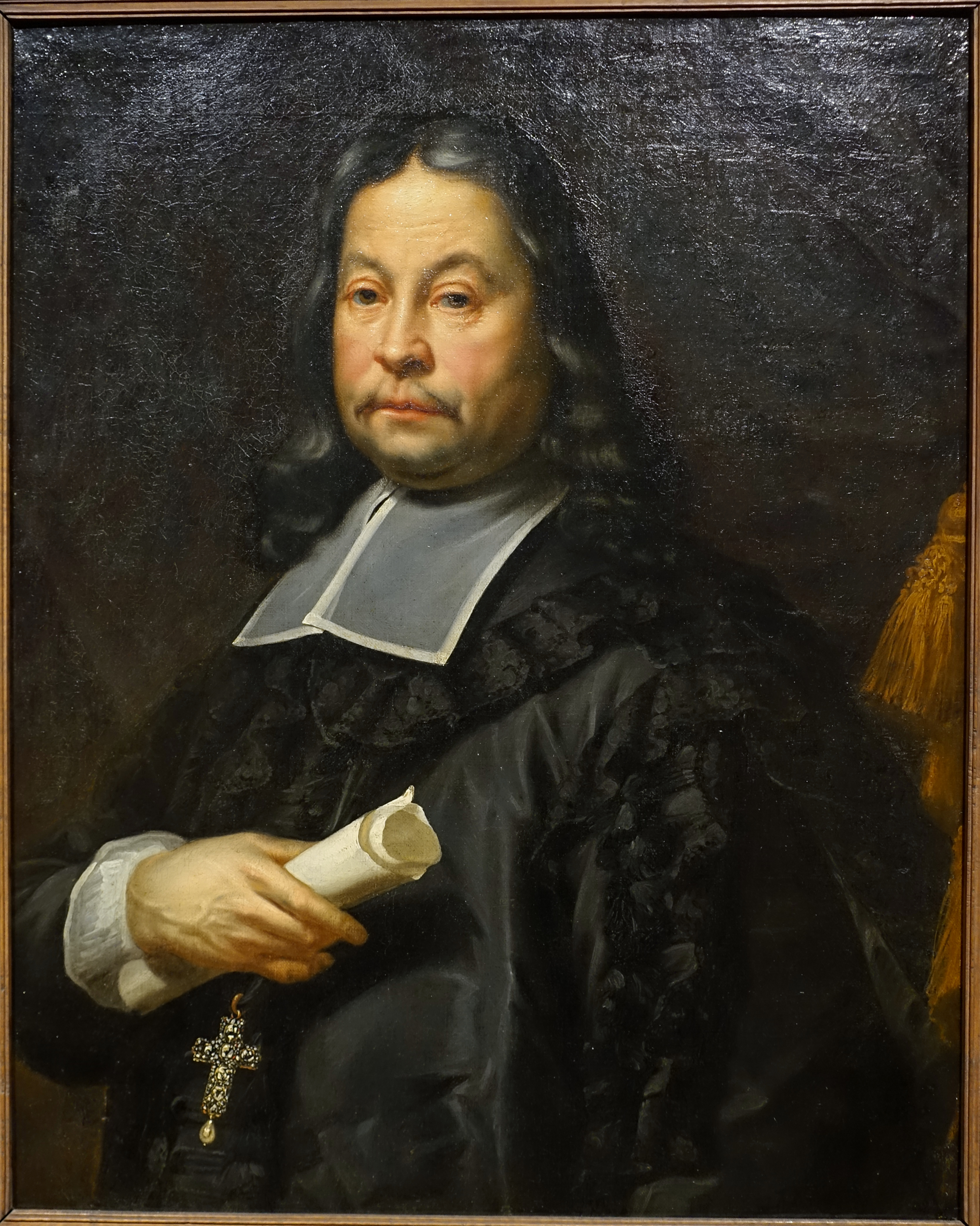
- Portrait by Johann Baptist de Rull, 1675–1676
- Church: Catholic Church
- Archdiocese: Mainz
- In office: 1675–1678
- Predecessor: Lothar Friedrich von Metternich-Burscheid
- Successor: Karl Heinrich von Metternich-Winneburg

Personal details
- Born: 12 March 1624
- Died: 6 December 1678

Damian Hartard Reichsfreiherr von der Leyen-Hohengeroldseck (12 March 1624, Trier – 6 December 1678) was a German nobleman who served as Archbishop-Elector of Mainz and Prince-Bishop of Worms from 1675 until his death in 1678.

== Biography ==
Damian Hartard von der Leyen-Hohengeroldseck was the younger brother of Karl Kaspar von der Leyen-Hohengeroldseck, who was Archbishop of Trier from 1652 to 1676. In 1654, Karl Kaspar arranged for Damian Hartard to be made Archdeacon of Karden and provost of the Stift St. Kastor in Karden. He was ordained as a priest at this time.

On 3 July 1675 the cathedral chapter of Mainz Cathedral elected Damian Hartard as the new Archbishop of Mainz. The cathedral chapter of Worms Cathedral also selected him as the new Bishop of Worms on 12 July 1675, thus continuing the personal union between the Archbishopric of Mainz and the Bishopric of Worms that had existed since 1663. Pope Clement X confirmed both appointments on 24 February 1676. He was consecrated as a bishop on 8 September 1676 and installed as Bishop of Worms on 31 October 1676.

He purchased Neuerburg for his family in 1678.

During his reign, the eastern block of the Electoral Palace Mainz was completed.

He is buried in Mainz Cathedral.

Damian Hartard von der Leyen-Hohengeroldseck House of Leyen Born: 12 March 1624 Died: 6 December 1678
Catholic Church titles
Regnal titles
Preceded by Lothar Friedrich von Metternich-Burscheid	Archbishop-Elector of Mainz; 1675–1678	Succeeded by Karl Heinrich von Metternich-Winneburg
Preceded by Lothar Friedrich von Metternich-Burscheid	Prince-Bishop of Worms; 1675–1678	Succeeded by Karl Heinrich von Metternich-Winneburg
