= Georg Anton von Rodenstein =

German Prince-Bishop

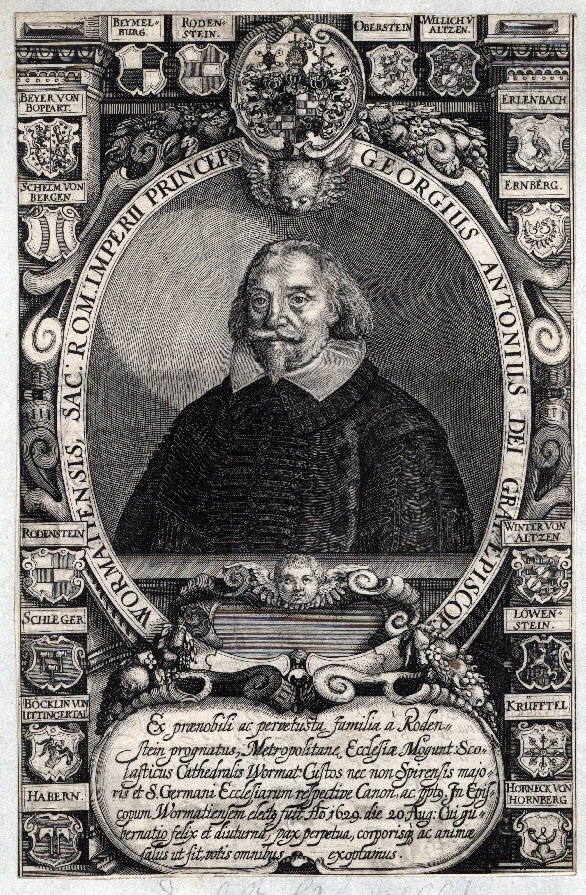
Georg Anton von Rodenstein

Georg Anton von Rodenstein (29 September 1579 – 30 October 1652) was the Prince-Bishop of Worms from 1629 to 1652.

== Biography ==
Georg Anton von Rodenstein was born in Rodenstein on 29 September 1579, the son of Georg Otto von Rodenstein and Anna Helena von Oberstein. He became a canon of Speyer Cathedral in 1594. Between 1594 and 1601, he studied at the University of Douai, the University of Poitiers, in Rome, and at the University of Siena.

He became a canon of Worms Cathedral in 1609, and was ordained as a priest in 1610. He became a canon of Mainz Cathedral in 1612. He became the dean of Speyer Cathedral in 1622.

On 20 August 1629 the cathedral chapter of Worms Cathedral elected him to be the new Prince-Bishop of Worms, with Pope Urban VIII confirming the appointment on 18 September 1630.

He became the dean of Mainz Cathedral in 1634 and the provost of Mainz Cathedral in 1638.

He died on 30 October 1652.

Catholic Church titles
Preceded by Georg Friedrich von Greiffenklau	Prince-Bishop of Worms; 1629–1652	Succeeded by Hugo Eberhard Kratz von Scharfenstein
