= Gian Bernardo Frugoni =

Doge of the Republic of Genoa and king of Corsica

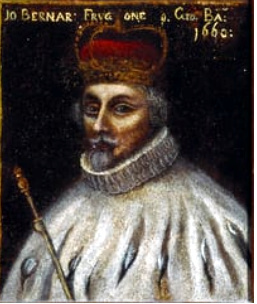

115th Doge of the Republic of Genoa
- In office October 28, 1660 – March 22, 1661
- Preceded by: Giovanni Battista Centurione
- Succeeded by: Antoniotto Invrea

Personal details
- Born: 1591 Genoa, Republic of Genoa
- Died: March 22, 1661 (aged 69–70) Genoa, Republic of Genoa

Gian Bernardo Frugoni (Genoa, 1591 - Genoa, March 22, 1661) was the 115th Doge of the Republic of Genoa and king of Corsica.

== Biography ==
Frugoni was born in Genoa around 1591, his family was originally from Chiavari. He was elected Doge of Genoa in 1660, the seventieth in biennial succession and the one hundred and fifteenth in republican history. As doge he was also invested with the related biennial office of king of Corsica. His Dogate was short as he suddenly died in Genoa on March 22, 1661.

== See also ==
- Republic of Genoa
- Doge of Genoa
