= Anselm Franz von Ingelheim (archbishop of Mainz) =

- Archbishop of Mainz
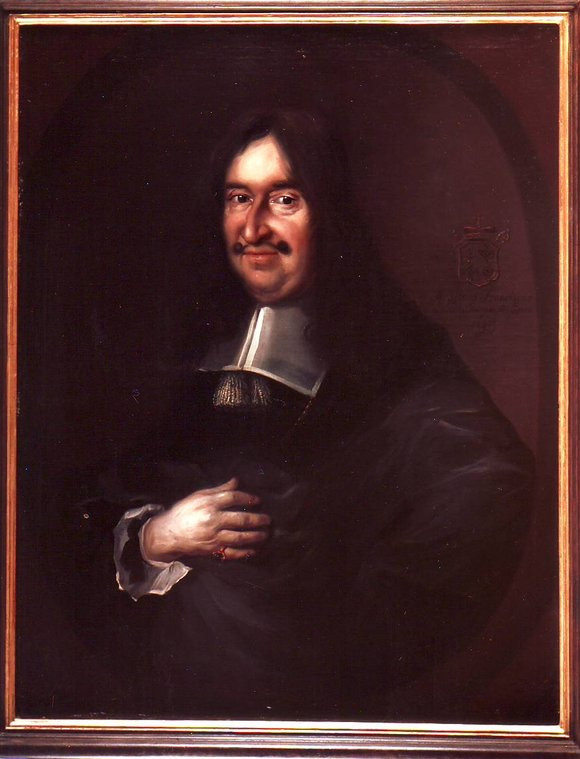
- Church: Catholic Church
- Diocese: Electorate of Mainz
- In office: 1679–1695

Personal details
- Born: 16 September 1634
- Died: 30 March 1695 (aged 60)

Anselm Franz von Ingelheim (16 September 1634 – 30 March 1695) was Archbishop-Elector of Mainz from 1679 until his death in 1695.

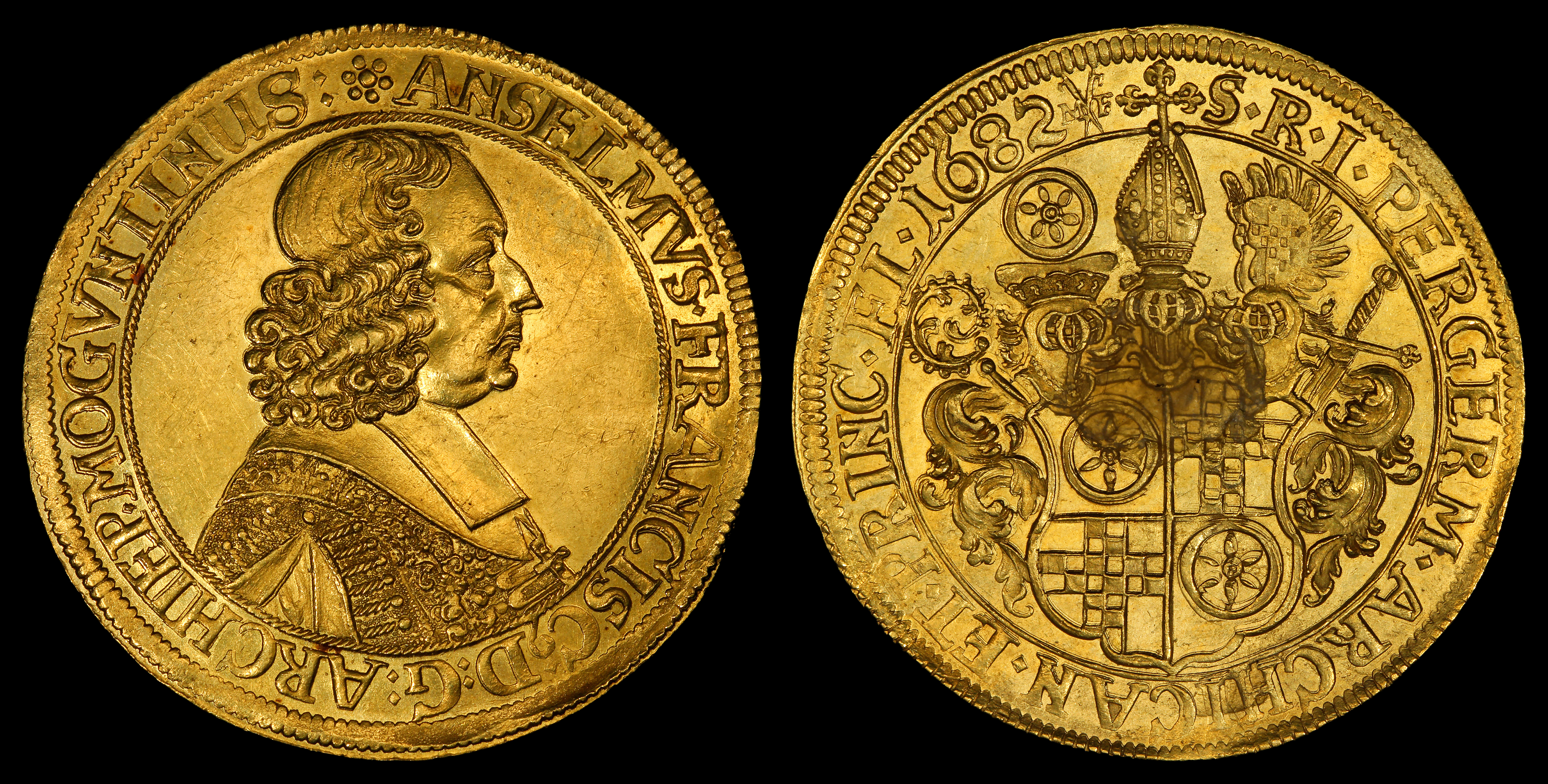
Anselm Franz von Ingelheim, Archbishop of Mainz, depicted on a Mainz, German States 10 Ducat coin (1682)

Anselm became prince-bishop of Mainz on 7 November 1679 and thus was an elector of the Holy Roman Empire. He crowned the empress Eleonor Magdalene of Neuburg, the wife of emperor Leopold I, in 1689 and one year later their son Joseph I, as the King of Hungary.

The sixteen-year reign of Anselm Franz was clouded by the constant effort around peace and neutrality and the devastation of the War of the Grand Alliance, which caused him to live in exile in Aschaffenburg. He died there in 1695.

Catholic Church titles
Preceded by Karl Heinrich von Metternich	Archbishop of Mainz; 1679-1695	Succeeded by Lothar Franz von Schönborn
