= Antoniotto Invrea =

Doge of the Republic of Genoa and king of Corsica

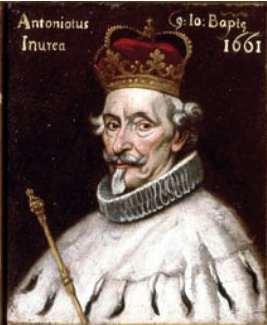

116th Doge of the Republic of Genoa
- In office 28 March 1661 – 29 March 1663
- Preceded by: Gian Bernardo Frugoni
- Succeeded by: Stefano De Mari

Personal details
- Born: 1588 Genoa, Republic of Genoa
- Died: 1669 (aged 80–81) Genoa, Republic of Genoa

Antoniotto Invrea (Genoa, 1588 - Genoa, 1669) was the 116th Doge of the Republic of Genoa, king of Corsica and marquis of Pontinvrea.

== Biography ==
In his dogate, the seventy-two year sequence and centosedicesimo in republican history, Invrea maintained diplomatic and political relations with the France of Louis XIV and the England of Charles II. In the role of the highest office of the state, he attended the party at the Doge's chapel in Doge's Palace for the marriage of his son Ottaviano to Sofonisba Raggio.

== See also ==
- Republic of Genoa
- Doge of Genoa
