= Franz Emmerich Kaspar von Waldbott von Bassenheim =

German Prince-Bishop

Franz Emmerich Kaspar von Waldbott von Bassenheim (1626–1683) was the Prince-Bishop of Worms from 1679 to 1682.

== Biography ==
Franz Emmerich Kaspar von Waldbott von Bassenheim was born in Bassenheim in 1626. His father was the bailiff of the Electorate of Trier based in Lahnstein.

In 1637, he was made a canon of Mainz Cathedral. He later received additional canonries at Speyer Cathedral and Worms Cathedral, where he eventually became provost. He became the curator of Mainz Cathedral on May 15, 1679.

On November 10, 1679, the cathedral chapter of Worms Cathedral elected him to be the Prince-Bishop of Worms, with Pope Innocent XI confirming this appointment on June 26, 1681. He died without having been consecrated as a bishop.

He died in Speyer on July 11, 1683 and is buried in Worms Cathedral.

Catholic Church titles
Preceded by Karl Heinrich von Metternich-Winneburg	Prince-Bishop of Worms; 1679–1683	Succeeded by Johannes Karl von und zu Franckenstein
