= Karl Heinrich von Metternich-Winneburg =

German Prince-Bishop and nobleman

- Archbishop-Elector of Mainz
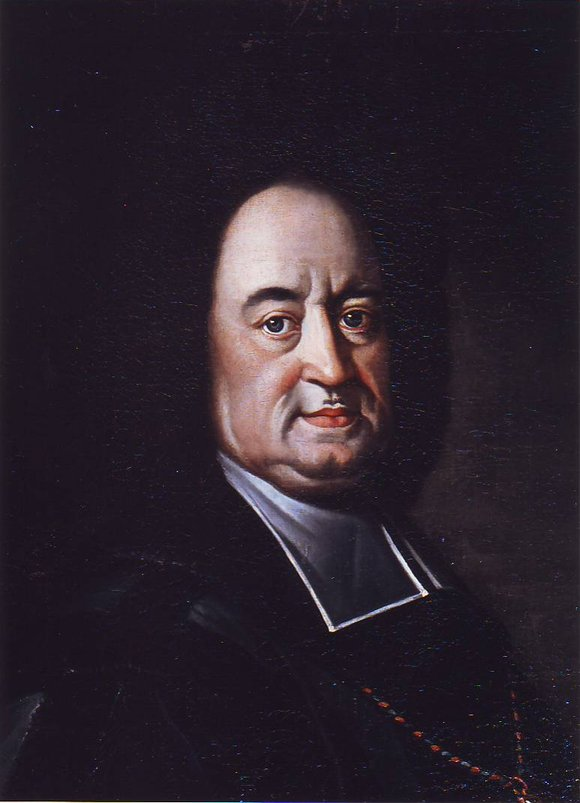
- Church: Catholic Church
- Archdiocese: Mainz
- Installed: 9 January 1679
- Term ended: 28 September 1679
- Predecessor: Damian Hartard von der Leyen-Hohengeroldseck
- Successor: Anselm Franz von Ingelheim

Personal details
- Born: 14 July 1622
- Died: 28 September 1679

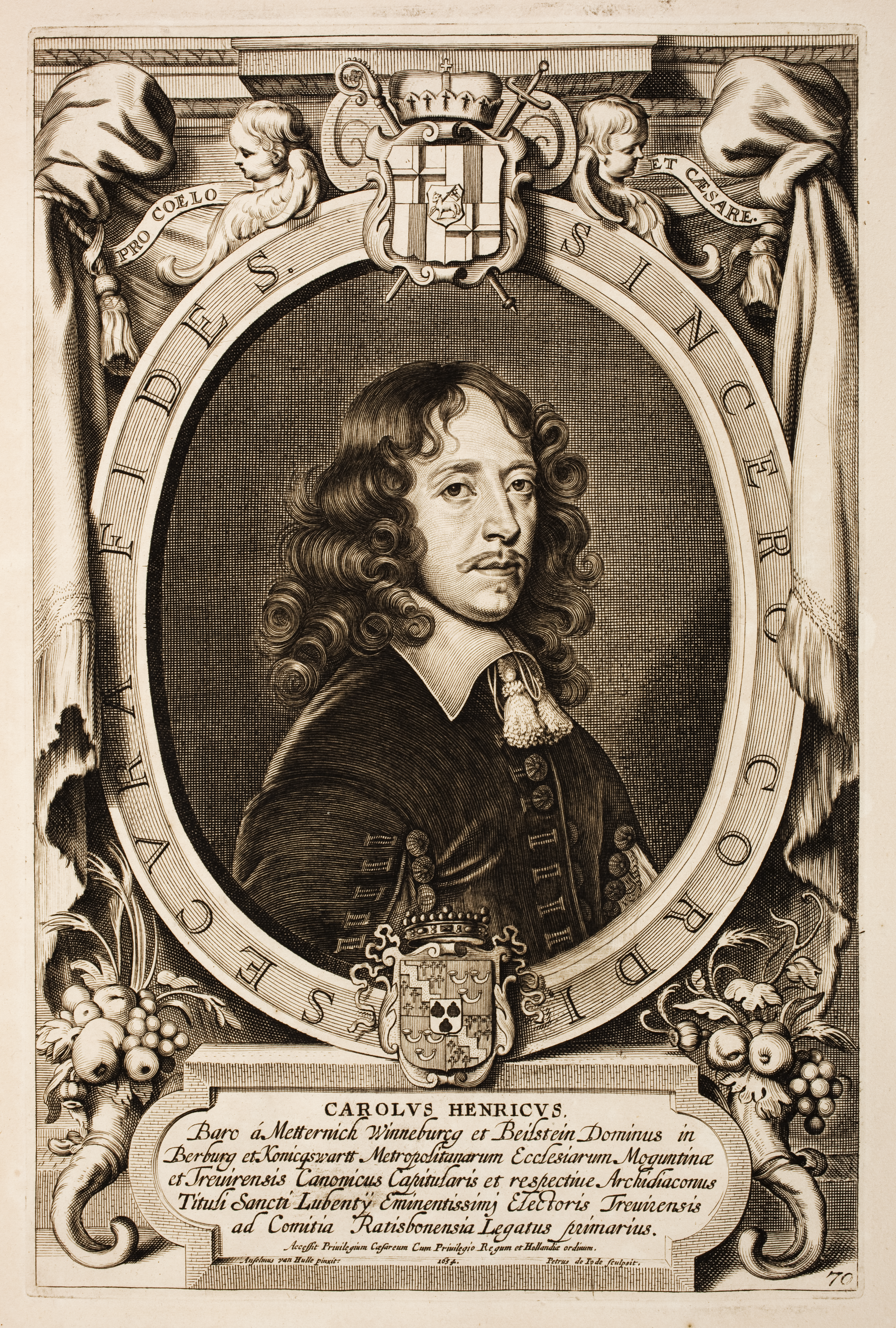
Engraving of Karl Heinrich

Karl Heinrich von Metternich-Winneburg (14 July 1622 – 28 September 1679) was a German nobleman who served as Archbishop and Elector of Mainz from 9 January 1679 until his death on 28 September. He was also Prince-Bishop of Worms from 30 January 1679.

== Biography ==
Karl Heinrich von Metternich-Winneburg was born in Koblenz on 14 July 1622. He was ordained as a priest in Mainz in 1655. From 1664 to 1666, he was the rector of the University of Mainz.

The cathedral chapter of Mainz Cathedral elected Karl Heinrich von Metternich-Winneburg Archbishop of Mainz on 9 January 1679. On 25 January 1679 the cathedral chapter of Worms Cathedral elected him Bishop of Worms, thus continuing the personal union between the Archbishopric of Mainz and the Bishop of Worms that had existed since 1663. Pope Innocent XI confirmed both appointments on 4 September 1679.

He died on 28 September 1679, never having been consecrated as a bishop. He is buried in Mainz Cathedral.

Karl Heinrich von Metternich-Winneburg House of Metternich Born: 15 July 1622 Died: 26 September 1679
Catholic Church titles
Regnal titles
Preceded by Damian Hartard von der Leyen-Hohengeroldseck	Archbishop-Elector of Mainz; 1679	Succeeded by Anselm Franz von Ingelheim
Preceded by Damian Hartard von der Leyen-Hohengeroldseck	Prince-Bishop of Worms; 1679	Succeeded by Franz Emmerich Kaspar von Waldbott von Bassenheim
