= Johann Philipp von Schönborn =

German archbishop

- Archbishop of Mainz
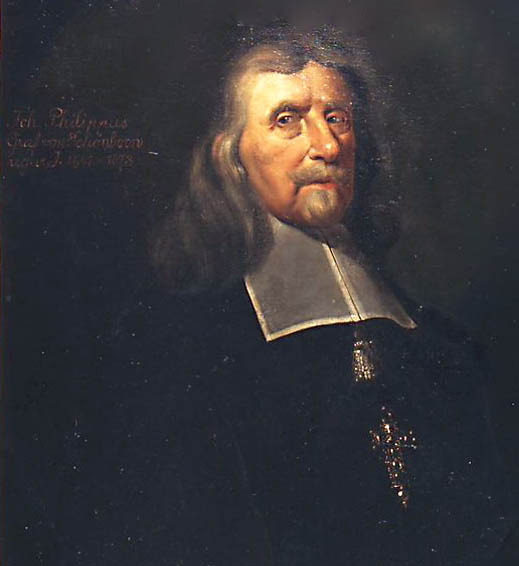
- Church: Catholic Church
- Archdiocese: Electorate of Mainz
- In office: 19 November 1647–12 February 1673
- Predecessor: Anselm Casimir Wambold von Umstadt
- Successor: Lothar Friedrich von Metternich-Burscheid

Personal details
- Born: 6 August 1605 Eschbach
- Died: 12 February 1673 (aged 67) Würzburg

Johann Philipp von Schönborn (6 August 1605 – 12 February 1673) was the Archbishop-Elector of Mainz (1647–1673), the Bishop of Würzburg (1642–1673), and the Bishop of Worms (1663–1673).

== Life ==
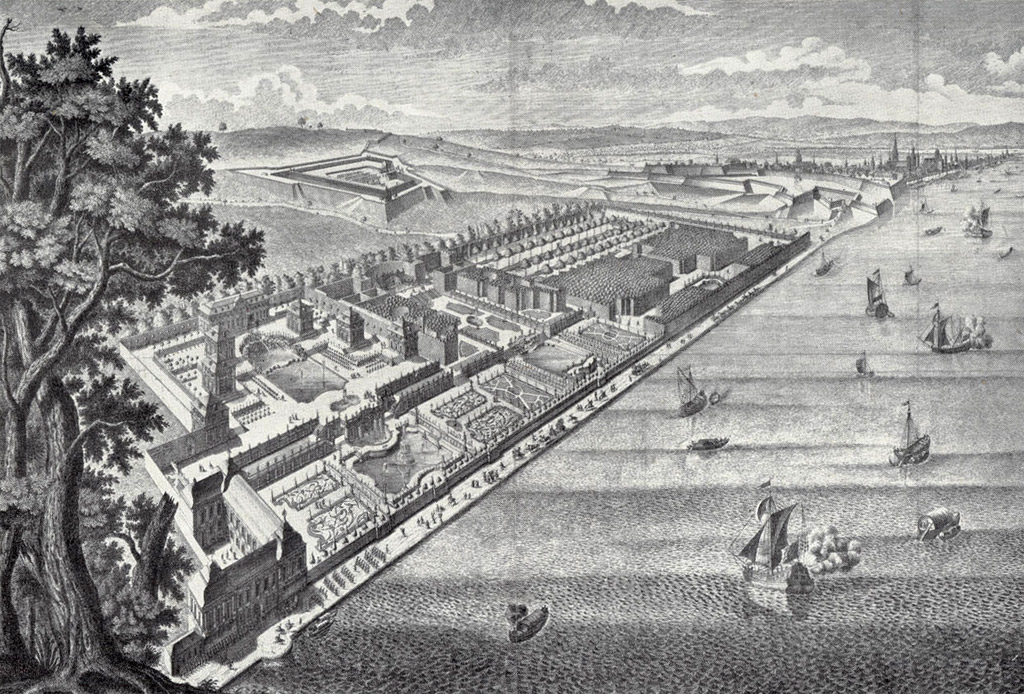
Favorite Palace at Mainz, built 1700-1722 for Lothar Franz von Schönborn

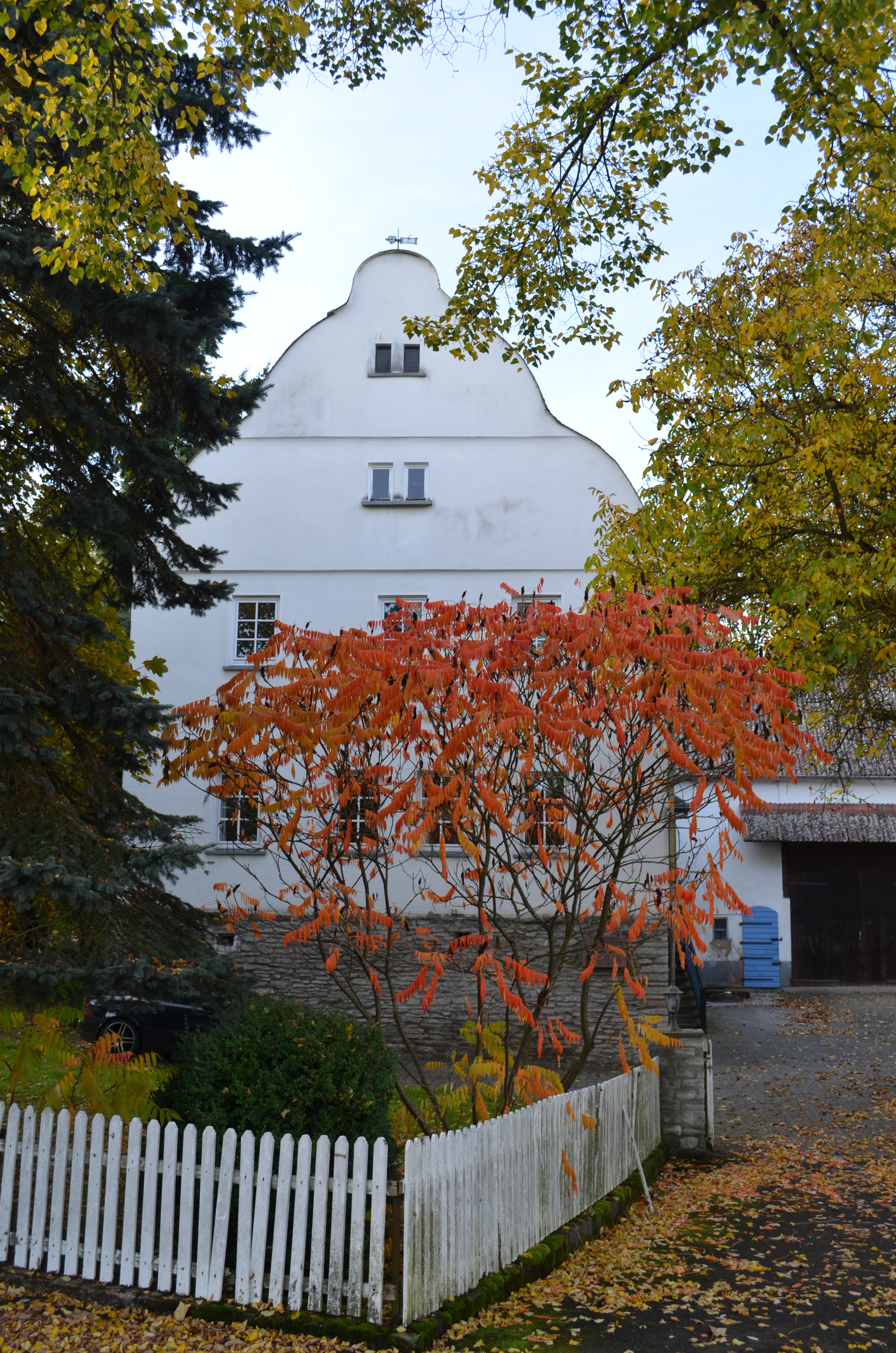
Birth house in Laubuseschbach

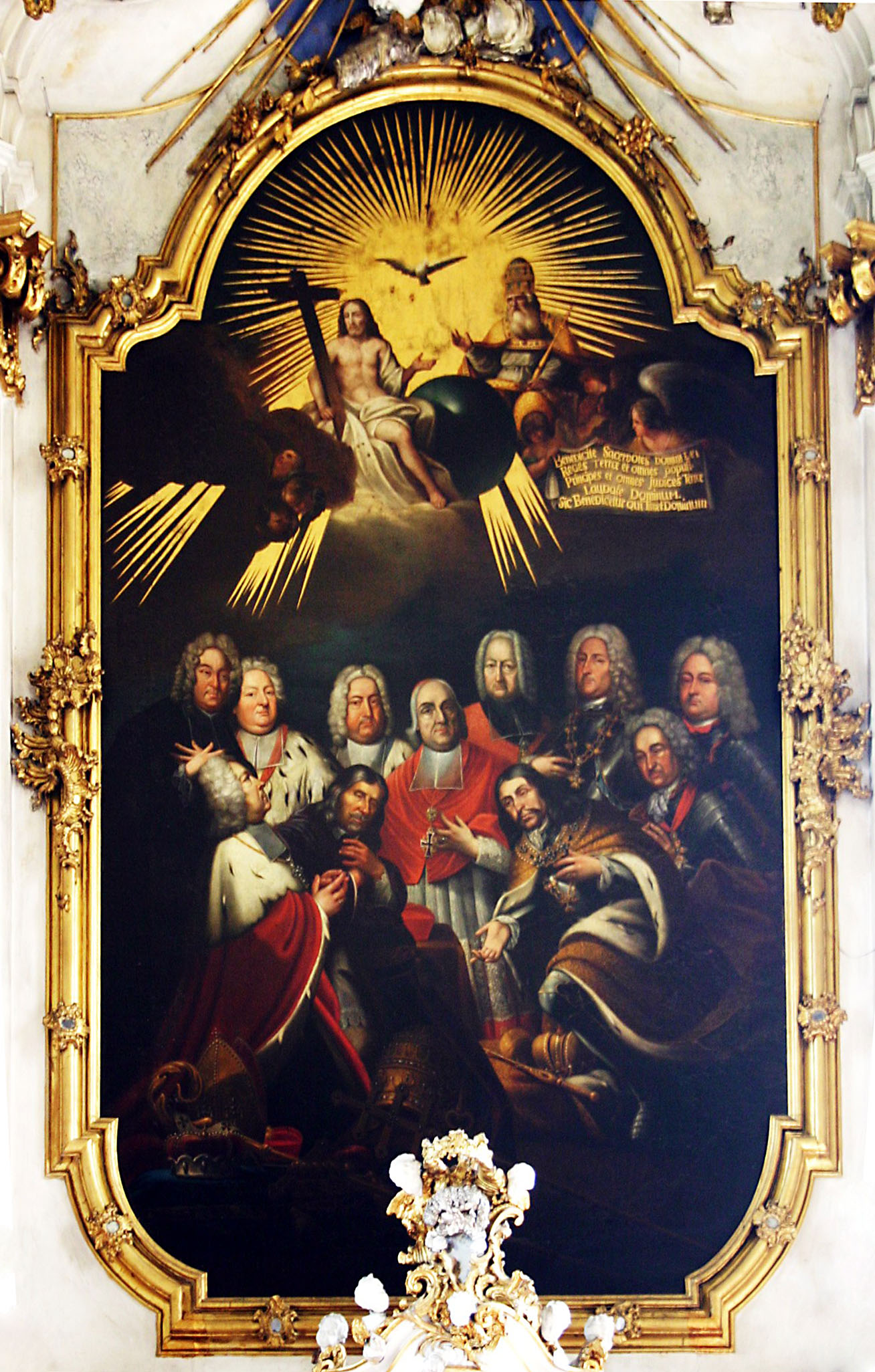
Three generations of the House of Schönborn. Johann Philipp, second from left, front row.

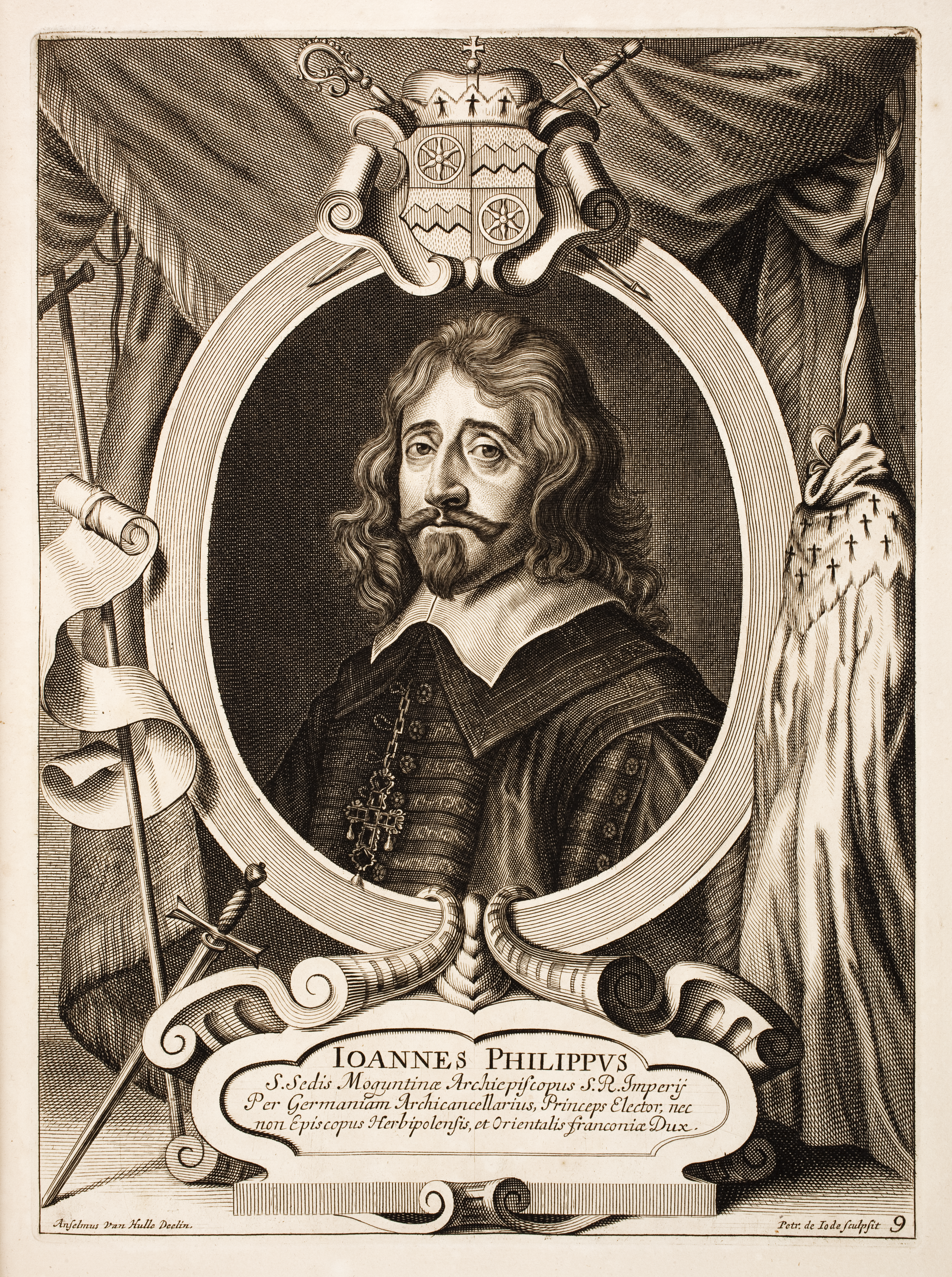
Portrait of Johann Philipp von Schönborn after Anselm van Hulle

Johann Philipp was born in his family's manor house at Laubuseschbach (present-day Hesse) to Georg von Schönborn, a minor nobleman at the employ of the Lutheran counts of Wied. The Schönborn family had knightly rank and was first mentioned in 1275. However, by the time Johann Philipp grew up, most branches of the family had extinguished, and in fact, he and his brother were the last sprouts of the family.

In 1621, after it had been ascertained that he possessed the minimum quarters of nobility required, he was admitted as a minor canon (domizellar) by the cathedral chapter of Wurzburg Cathedral, and in 1625 by the cathedral chapter of Mainz Cathedral as well. In 1626, he received consecration in Mainz. He became a cathedral canon of Würzburg in 1629 and of Worms in 1630. He was elected prince-bishop of Wurzburg on 8 September 1642 and archbishop-elector of Mainz on 19 November 1647.

His diplomatic skills made him an important mediator during the Peace of Westphalia negotiations that ended the Thirty Years' War in 1648. As a result, he was elected Archbishop of Mainz in 1647, thus also ruler of the Electorate of Mainz and archchancellor of the Holy Roman Empire. In 1663, he also received the prince-bishopric of Worms. He was an effective administrator of his principalities and was able to bring back economic recovery. He fortified the city of Mainz with the Fortress of Mainz and Mainz Citadel between 1655 and 1675. He also founded hospitals and high schools. His court was a center of German politics in the post-war era.

He made his brother Philip Erwein (1607–1668) a Vogt in the Electorate of Mainz, where the latter acquired the castles of Gaibach in 1650, of Geisenheim in 1654, and of Heusenstamm (where he built a new castle) in 1661. The family thus shifted its focus from its regions of origin (in modern Hesse), which had become predominantly Protestant, to the catholic ecclesiastical principalities of the empire, located in Franconia and on the Rhine.

He died in Würzburg in 1673 and was interred in Mainz Cathedral.

== Legacy ==
Johann Philipp was the first of six members of the Schönborn family who, in the course of more than three generations, were to rule over eight of the most prestigious ecclesiastical principalities of the Holy Roman Empire, giving the name Schönbornzeit to an era (1642–1756), sometimes nostalgically remembered in the popular conscience as an era of prosperity. Today, the term Schönbornzeit denotes a particular style of Rhenish and Franconian baroque. His contemporaries gave him the honorable titles of "The Wise", "The German Solomon", and "The Cato of Germany".

Catholic Church titles
Preceded by Franz von Hatzfeld	Prince-Bishop of Würzburg; 1642–1673	Succeeded by Johann Hartmann von Rosenbach
Preceded by Anselm Casimir Wambold von Umstadt	Archbishop-Elector of Mainz; 1647-1673	Succeeded by Lothar Friedrich von Metternich-Burscheid
Preceded by Hugo Eberhard Kratz von Scharfenstein	Prince-Bishop of Worms; 1663–1673	Succeeded by Lothar Friedrich von Metternich-Burscheid
