= Lothar Friedrich von Metternich-Burscheid =

Prince-Bishop of Speyer

- Archbishop of Mainz
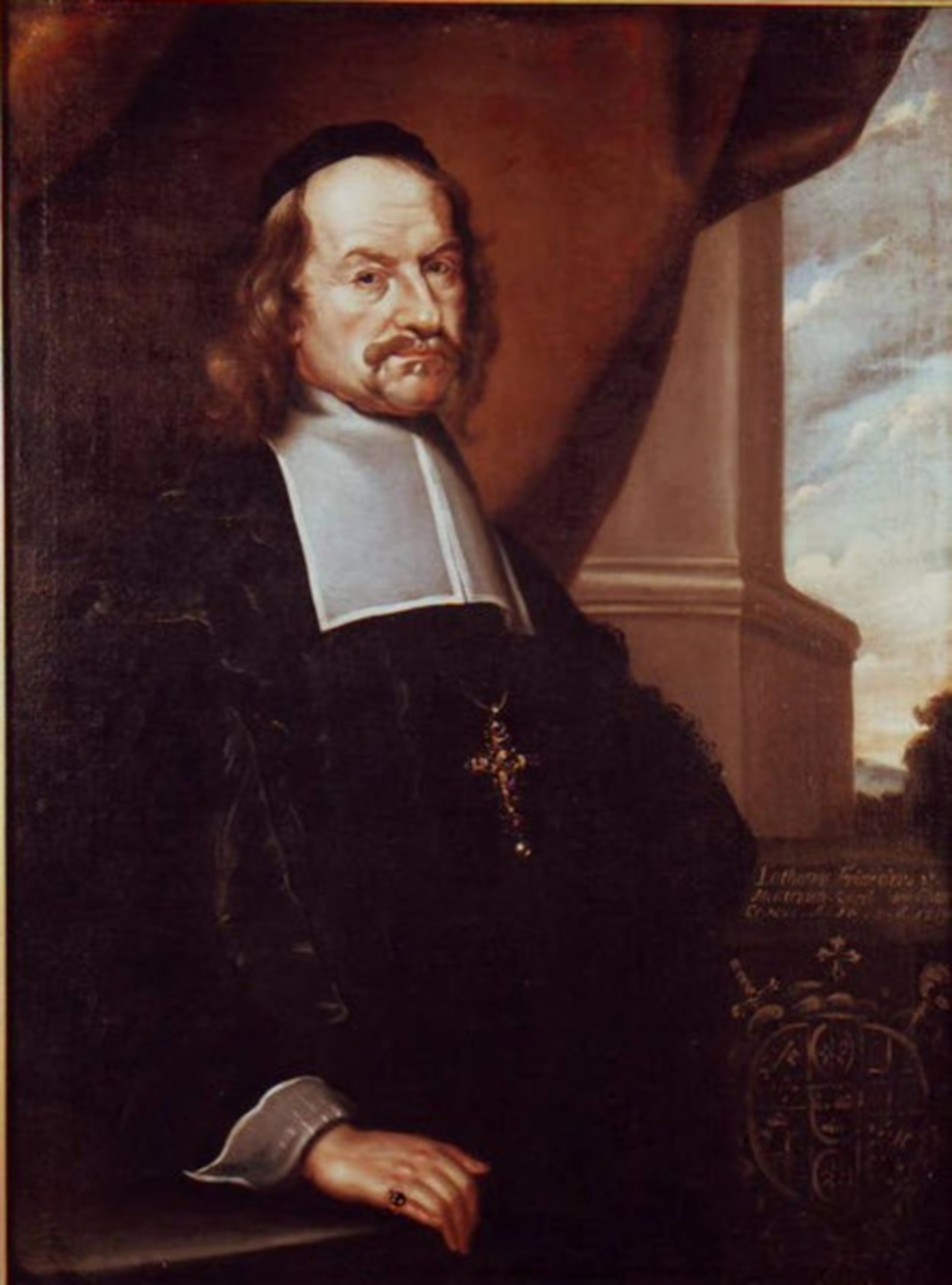
- Church: Catholic Church
- Archdiocese: Electorate of Mainz
- In office: 1673–1675
- Predecessor: Johann Philipp von Schönborn
- Successor: Damian Hartard von der Leyen-Hohengeroldseck

Personal details
- Born: 29 September 1617
- Died: 3 June 1675 (aged 57)

Lothar Friedrich von Metternich-Burscheid (29 September 1617 – 3 June 1675) was the Bishop of Speyer from 1652 to 1675 and also Archbishop of Mainz and Bishop of Worms from 1673 to 1675.

== Biography ==
Lothar Friedrich von Metternich-Burscheid was born on 29 September 1617 in Bourscheid Castle, a member of the House of Metternich. He was the younger son of Johann Gerhard von Metternich, Lord of Burscheid and Esch (d. 1644) and his wife, Maria von der Leyen (d. 1660). As it was a custom in all great houses of the time, the younger son was almost always destined for ecclesiastical career. At the age of eight, Lothar Friedrich von Metternich-Burscheid became a canon (Domizellar) in Trier. He studied in Trier 1635-36 and then at the Jesuit school in Pont-à-Mousson. He became Domizellar of Mainz in 1639. He was ordained as a deacon in 1640

On 11 April 1652 the cathedral chapter of Speyer Cathedral elected Lothar Friedrich von Metternich-Burscheid Bishop of Speyer. He was ordained as a priest on 17 December 1652. On 9 June 1653, Pope Innocent X confirmed his appointment as Bishop of Speyer, and directed him to repair Speyer Cathedral and to found a seminary. He was consecrated as a bishop by Heinrich Wolter von Strevesdorff, Auxiliary Bishop of Mainz on 24 June 1656.

The cathedral chapter of Mainz Cathedral elected Lothar Friedrich von Metternich-Burscheid Coadjutor Archbishop of Mainz on 15 December 1670, with the understanding that he would succeed as Archbishop upon the death of Johann Philipp von Schönborn. Pope Clement X confirmed this arrangement on 16 November 1671. As such, Lothar Friedrich von Metternich-Burscheid succeeded as Archbishop of Mainz on 12 February 1673. The cathedral chapter of Worms Cathedral elected him as Bishop of Worms on 16 April 1673.

Lothar Friedrich von Metternich-Burscheid died in Mainz on 3 June 1675.

Lothar Friedrich von Metternich-Burscheid House of Metternich Born: 29 September 1617 Died: 3 June 1675
Catholic Church titles
Preceded by Philipp Christoph von Sötern	Prince-Bishop of Speyer; 1652-1675	Succeeded by Johann Hugo von Orsbeck
Preceded by Johann Philipp von Schönborn	Archbishop-Elector of Mainz; 1673-1675	Succeeded by Damian Hartard von der Leyen-Hohengeroldseck
Preceded by Johann Philipp von Schönborn	Prince-Bishop of Worms; 1673–1675	Succeeded by Damian Hartard von der Leyen-Hohengeroldseck
