= Hugo Eberhard Kratz von Scharfenstein =

German Prince-Bishop

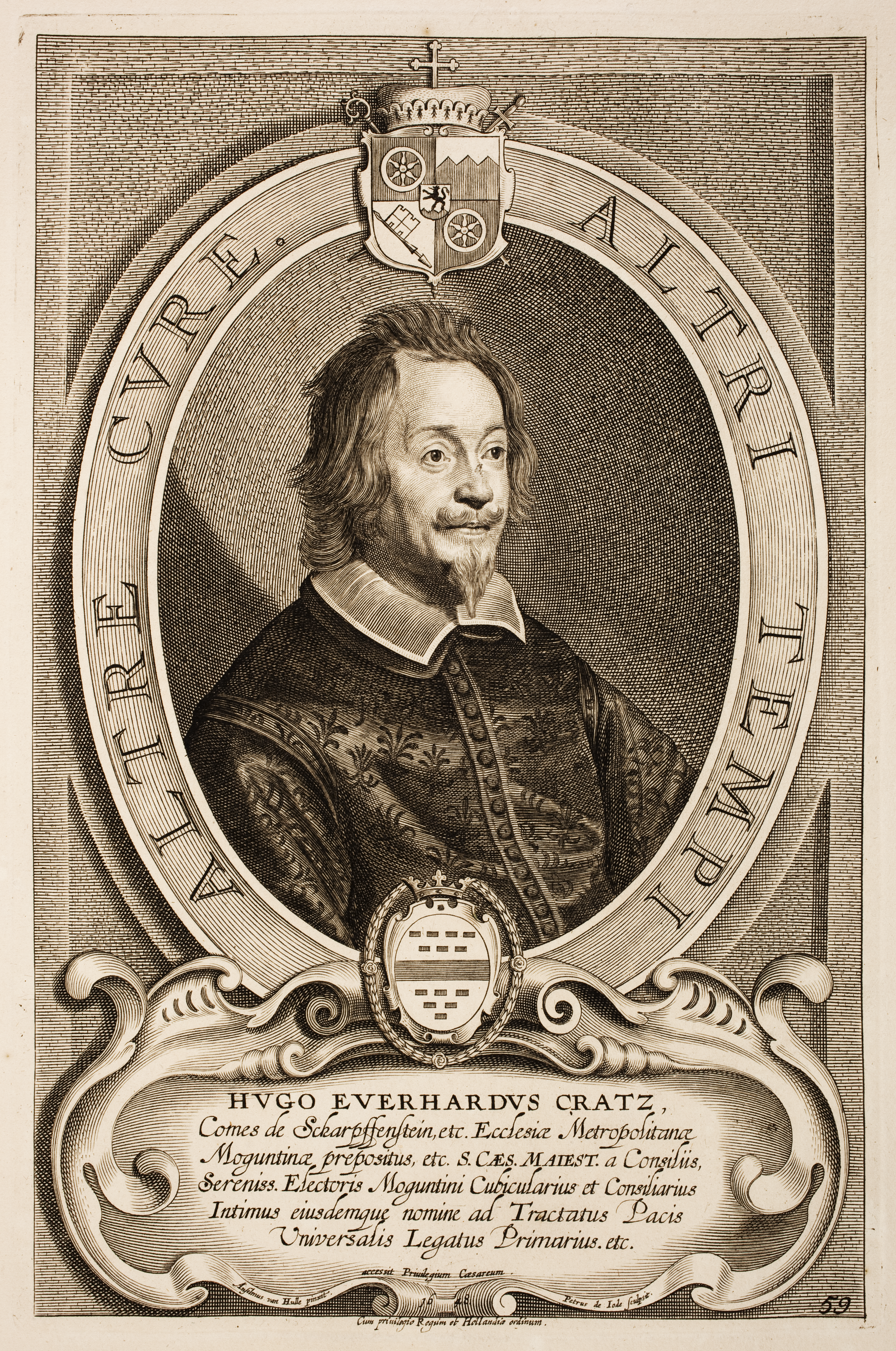
Hugo Everhard Cratz von Scharfenstein in Anselmus van Hulle: Les hommes illustres qui ont vécu dans le XVII. siecle, 1717

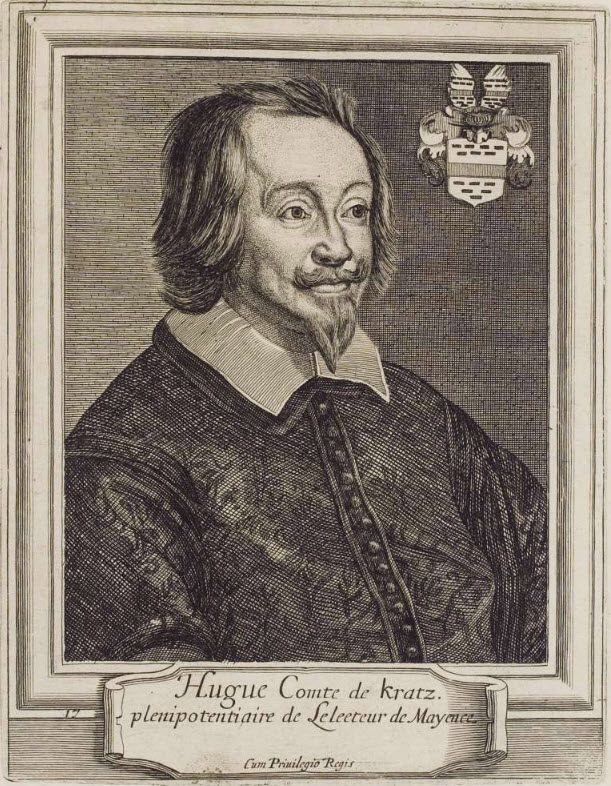
Hugo Eberhard von Cratz von Scharfenstein

Hugo Eberhard Kratz von Scharfenstein (1591 – 8 January 1663) was the Prince-Bishop of Worms from 1654 to 1663.

== Biography ==
Hugo Eberhard Graf Kratz von Scharfenstein was born in Engers in 1591.

He became canon (Domherr) of the Cathedral of Trier in 1602, of Mainz Cathedral in 1604, and of Worms Cathedral in 1608. In 1629, he became cantor of Mainz Cathedral. He was a member of the Mainz privy council from 1645 to 1647.

On 18 May 1654 the cathedral chapter of Worms Cathedral elected him to be the new Prince-Bishop of Worms, though it was not until 26 June 1662 that the appointment was confirmed by Pope Alexander VII.

He died on 8 January 1663.

Catholic Church titles
Preceded by Georg Anton von Rodenstein	Prince-Bishop of Worms; 1654–1663	Succeeded by Johann Philipp von Schönborn
