= Johann Baptist Ruel =

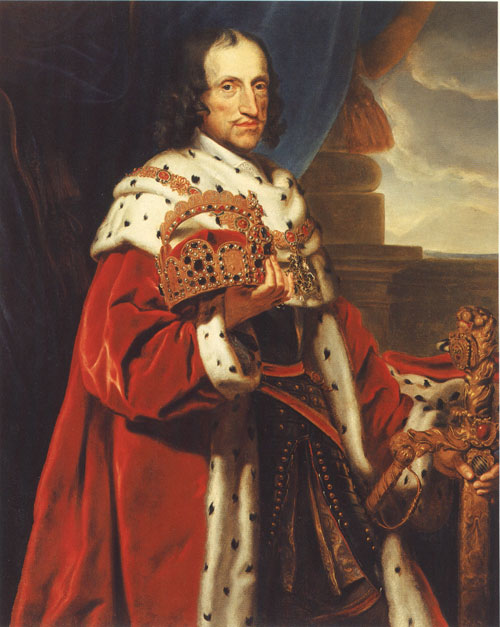
Charles I Louis, Elector Palatine, 1676, now in the Kurpfälzisches Museum

Johann Baptist Ruel, or de Ruel or de Rull, was born at Antwerp in 1634. He was introduced as a singer to the court of the Elector of Mayence, and was there instructed in painting by Jan Thomas. He afterwards settled at Würzburg, where he executed altar-pieces and portraits. A portrait by him is in the Munich Gallery. He died in 1685, or, according to others, in 1715.
