= Doge (title) =

Elected leader of an Italian city-state

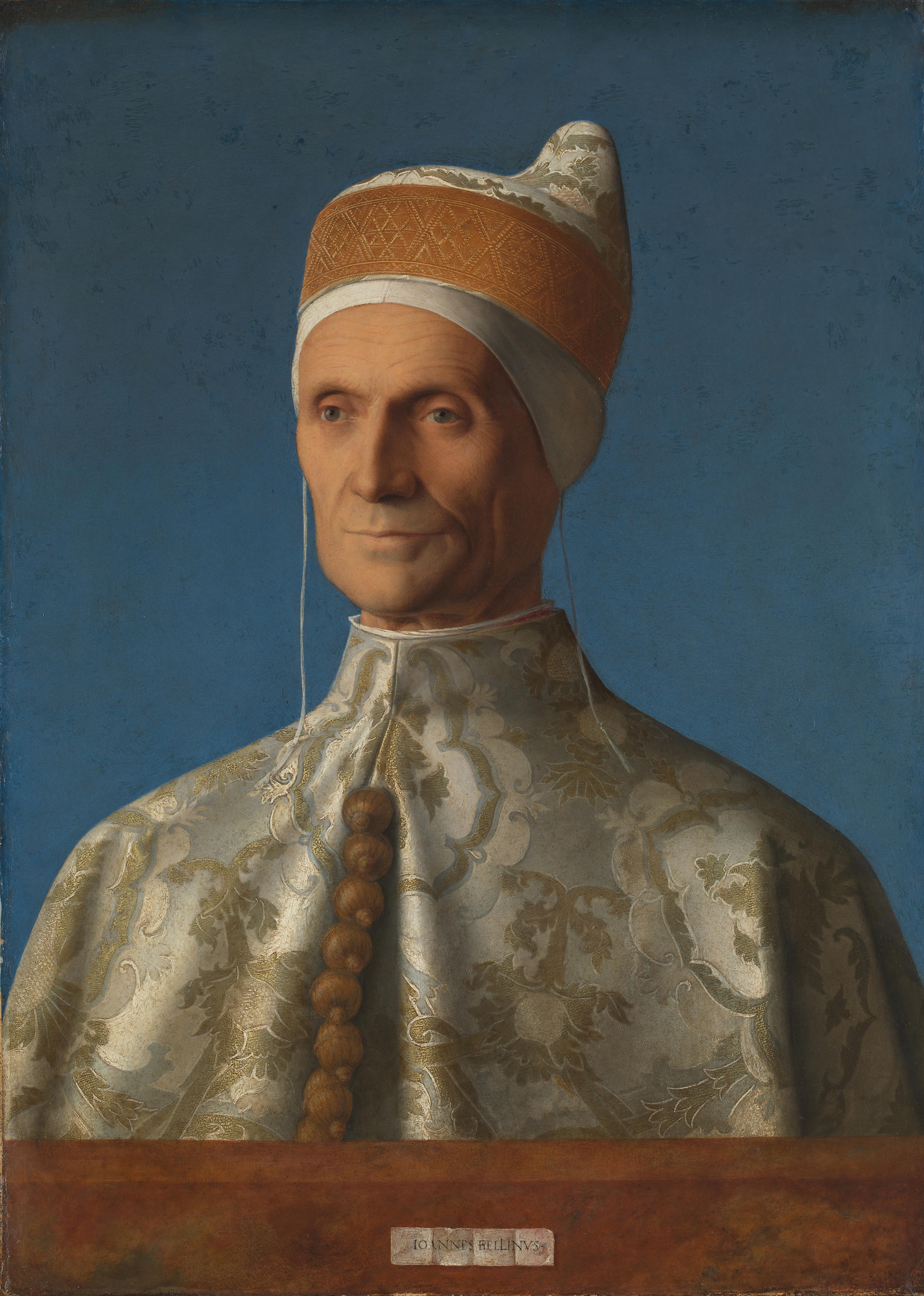
Leonardo Loredan (1501), Doge of Venice, portrait by Giovanni Bellini, wearing the corno ducale, the ducal hat which symbolised his office.

A doge (/doʊdʒ/ DOHJ, Italian: [ˈdɔːdʒe]; plural dogi or doges; see below) was an elected head of state in several Italian city-states, notably Venice and Genoa, during the medieval and Renaissance periods. Such states were referred to as crowned republics. Doges wore a special hat, the corno ducale, and usually ruled for life.

The office of the doge in English is termed a dogeship.

== Etymology ==
The word doge comes from Venetian Italian, and, like its standard Italian cognate duce (as in Mussolini's title "Il Duce"), is derived from the Latin dux, meaning either "spiritual leader" or "military commander". The political term doge reached English via French, along with the related English derivation duke.

In standard Italian, the two derivations from the Latin word dux – duce and duca (both masculine; feminine: duchessa) – are not interchangeable. Duca is an aristocratic and hereditary title similar to the English word duke.

The wife of a doge is styled a Dogaressa.

== Usage ==
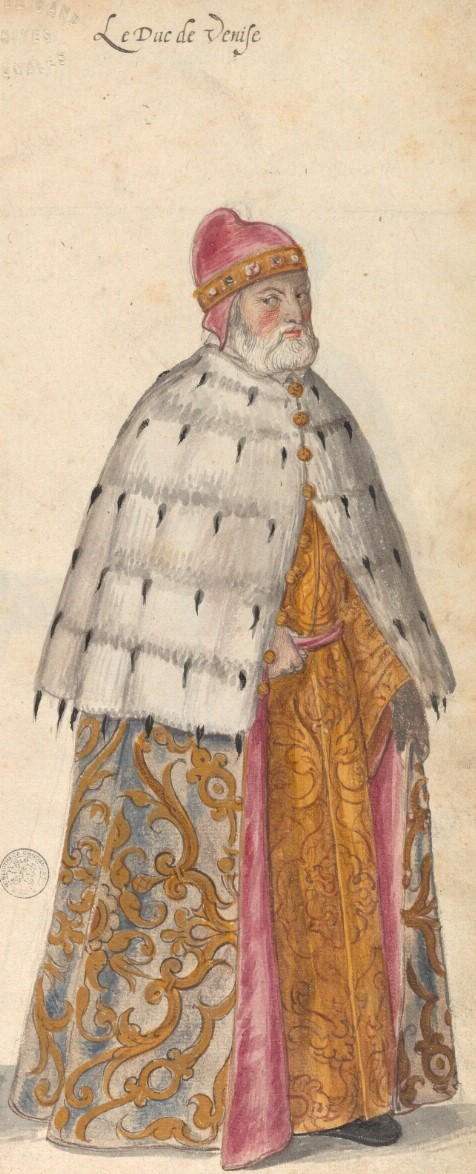
The Doge of Venice, illustrated in the manuscript "Théâtre de tous les peuples et nations de la terre avec leurs habits et ornemens divers, tant anciens que modernes, diligemment depeints au naturel". Painted by Lucas d'Heere in the 2nd half of the 16th century. Preserved by the Ghent University Library.

The title of doge was used for the elected chief of state in several Italian "crowned republics". The two best known such republics were Venice (where in Venetian he was called doxe [ˈdoze]) and Genoa (where he was called a dûxe [ˈdyːʒe]) which rivalled each other, and the other regional great powers, by building their historical city-states into maritime, commercial, and territorial empires. Other Italian republics to have doges were Amalfi and the small town of Senarica.

=== Selection ===
After 1172 the election of the Venetian doge was entrusted to a committee of forty, who were chosen by four men selected from the Great Council of Venice, which was itself nominated annually by 12 persons. After a deadlocked tie at the election of 1229, the number of electors was increased from forty to forty-one. New regulations for the elections of the doge introduced in 1268 remained in force until the end of the republic in 1797. Their object was to minimize as far as possible the influence of individual great families, and this was affected by complex elective machinery. Thirty members of the Great Council, chosen by lot, were reduced by lot to nine; the nine chose forty and the forty were reduced by lot to twelve, who chose twenty-five. The twenty-five were reduced by lot to nine and the nine elected forty-five. Then the forty-five were once more reduced by lot to eleven, and the eleven finally chose the forty-one who elected the doge. None could be elected but by at least twenty-five votes out of forty-one, nine votes out of eleven or twelve, or seven votes out of nine electors.

Initially, the doge of Genoa was elected without restriction and by popular suffrage. Following reforms in 1528, plebeians were declared ineligible, and the appointment of the doge was entrusted to the members of the Great Council, the Gran Consiglio.

=== Term of office and restrictions of power ===
In Venice, doges normally ruled for life, although a few were forcibly removed from office. While doges had great temporal power at first, after 1268, the doge was constantly under strict surveillance: he had to wait for other officials to be present before opening dispatches from foreign powers; he was not allowed to possess any property in a foreign land. After a doge's death, a commission of inquisitori passed judgment upon his acts, and his estate was liable to be fined for any discovered malfeasance. The official income of the doge was never large, and from early times holders of the office remained engaged in trading ventures.

Originally, Genoese doges held office for life in the so-called "perpetual dogeship"; but after the reform effected by Andrea Doria in 1528 the term of his office was reduced to two years. The ruling caste of Genoa tied them to executive committees, kept them on a small budget, and kept them apart from the communal revenues held at the Casa di San Giorgio.

== Gallery ==
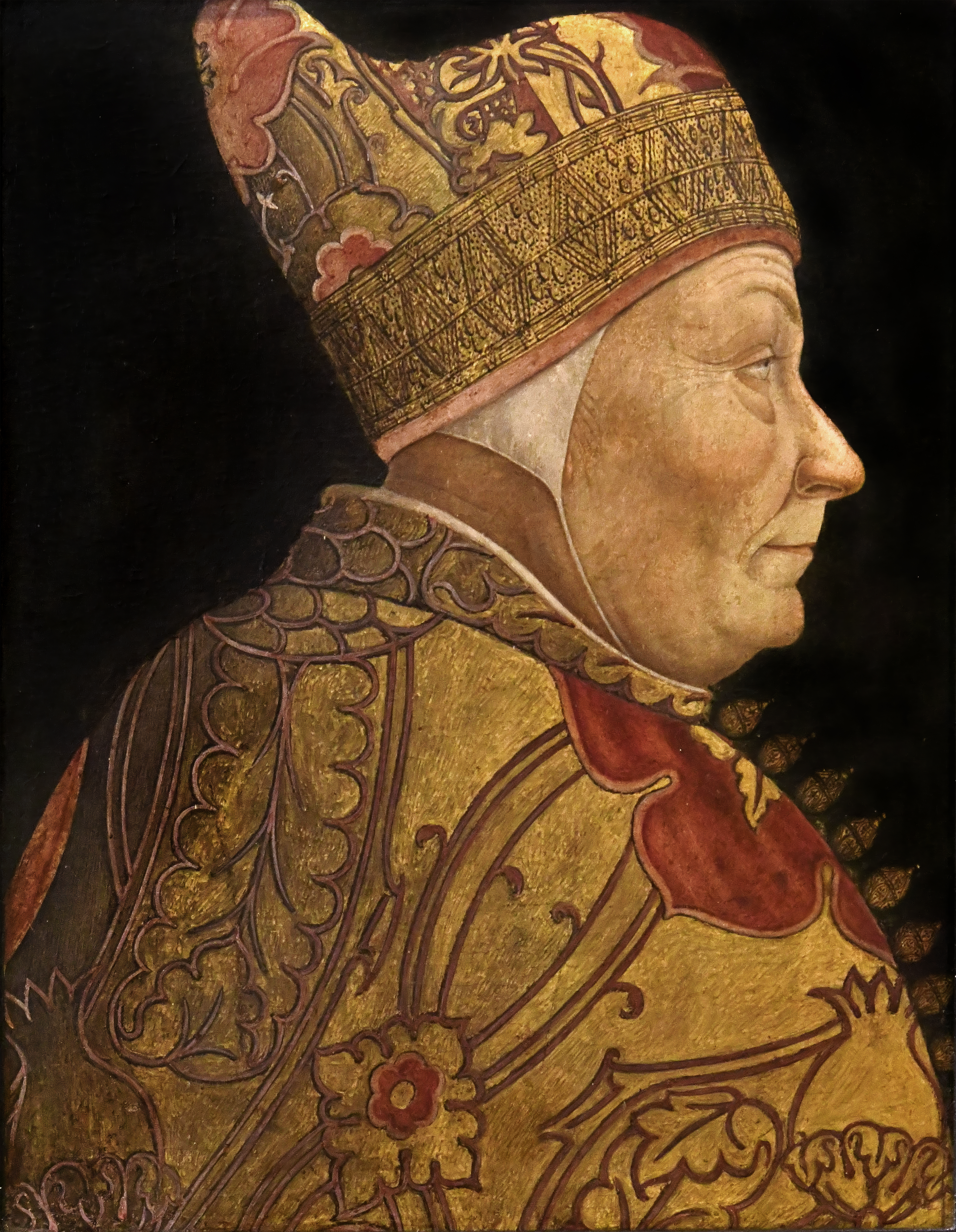
Francesco Foscari, Doge of Venice (1423–1457) by Lazzaro Bastiani

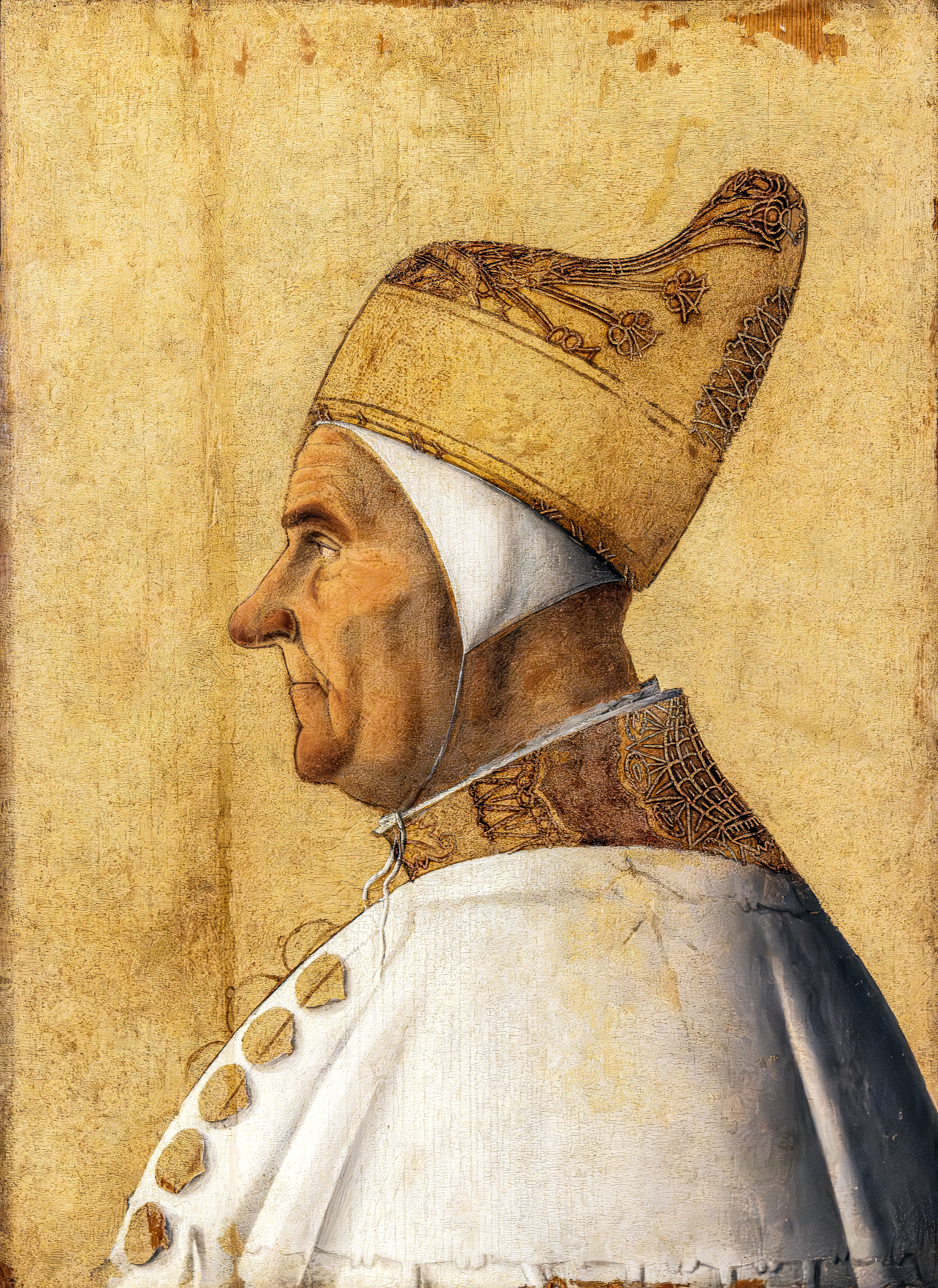
Portrait of Giovanni Mocenigo, Doge of Venice (1478–1485) by Gentile Bellini

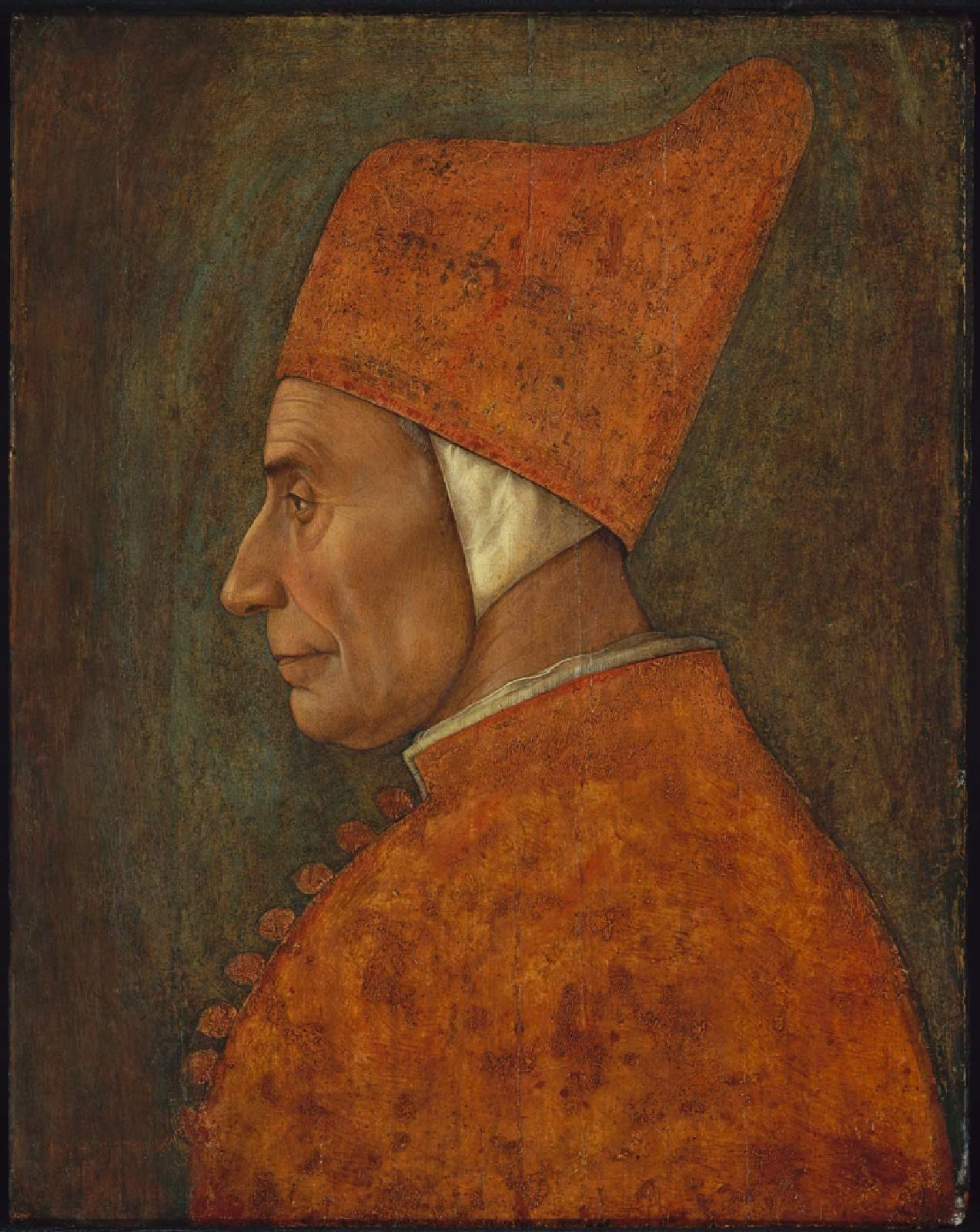
Pasquale Malipiero, Doge of Venice (1457–1462) by Gentile Bellini

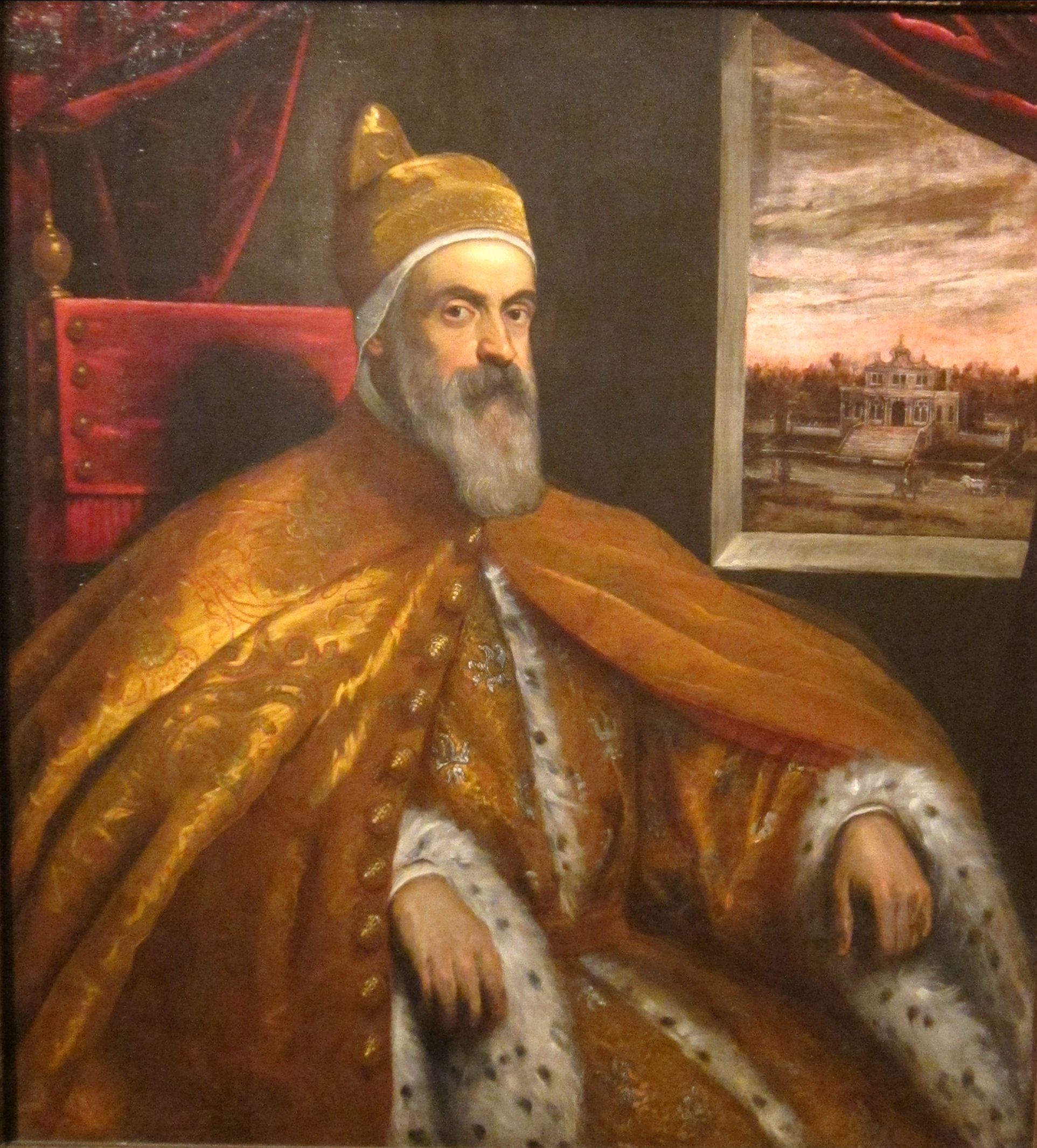
Marino Grimani, Doge of Venice (1532–1560) by Domenico Tintoretto

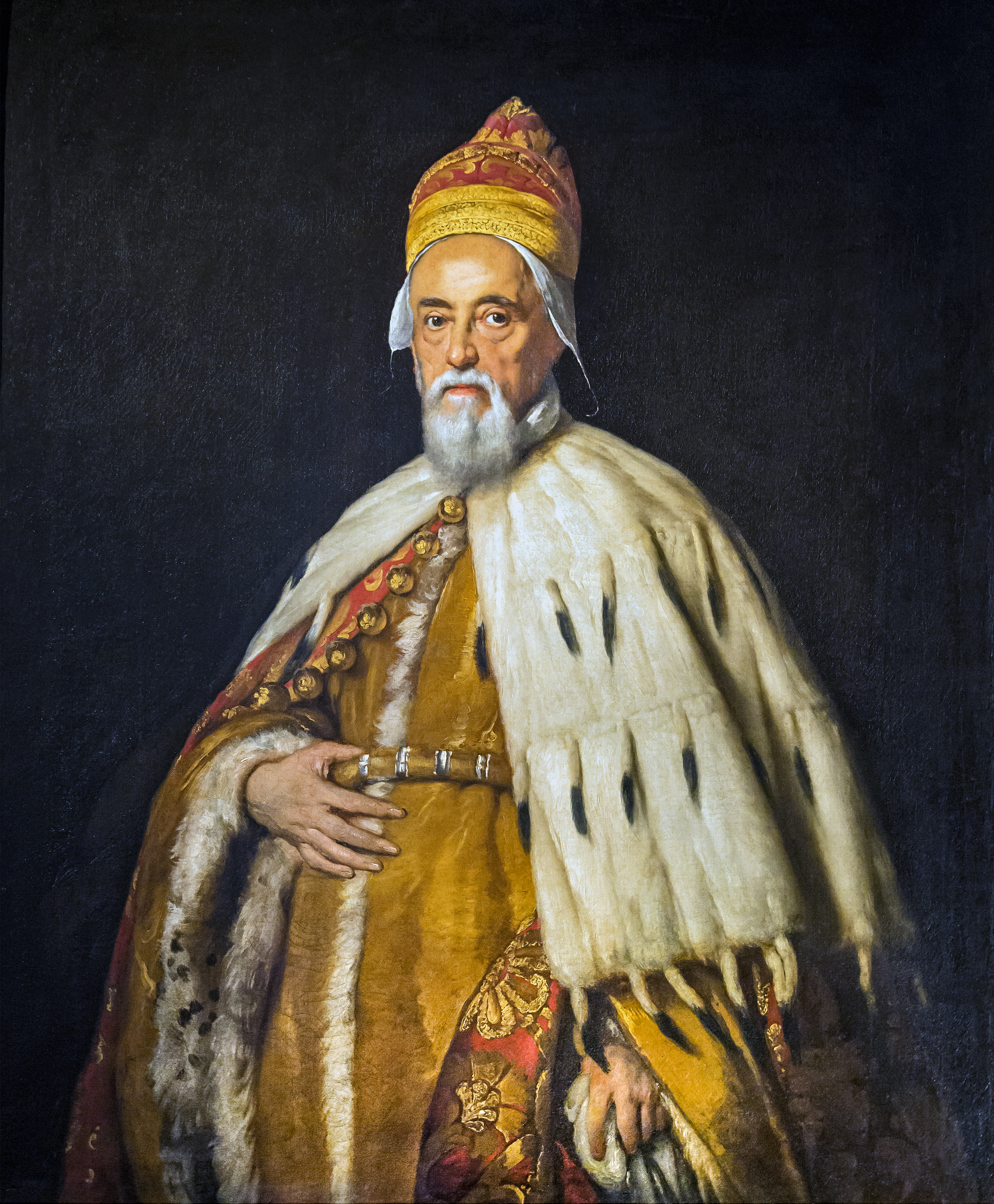
Francesco Erizzo, Doge of Venice (1631–1646) by Bernardo Strozzi

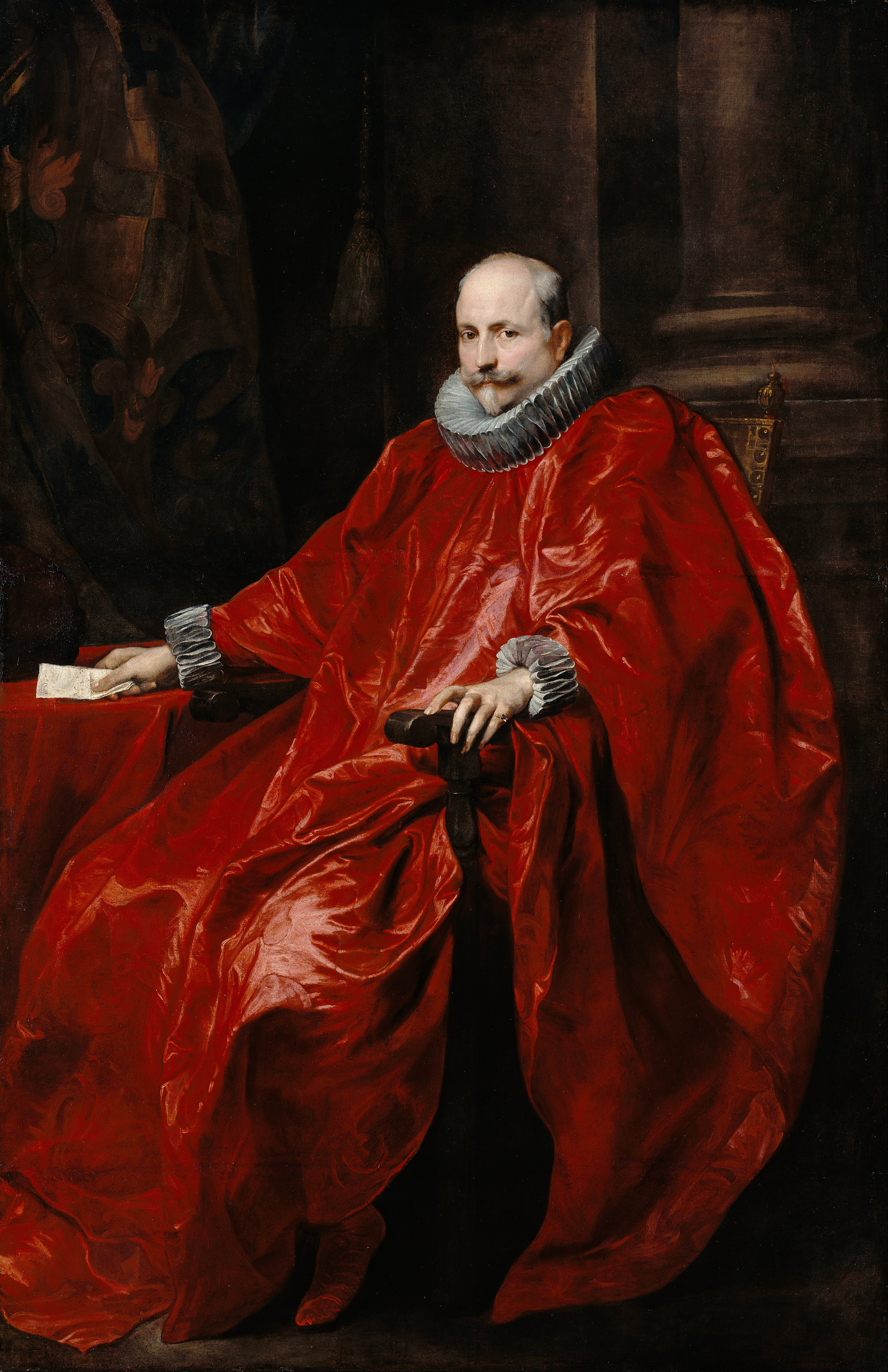
Agostino Pallavicini, Doge of Genoa (1637–1639) by Anthony van Dyck

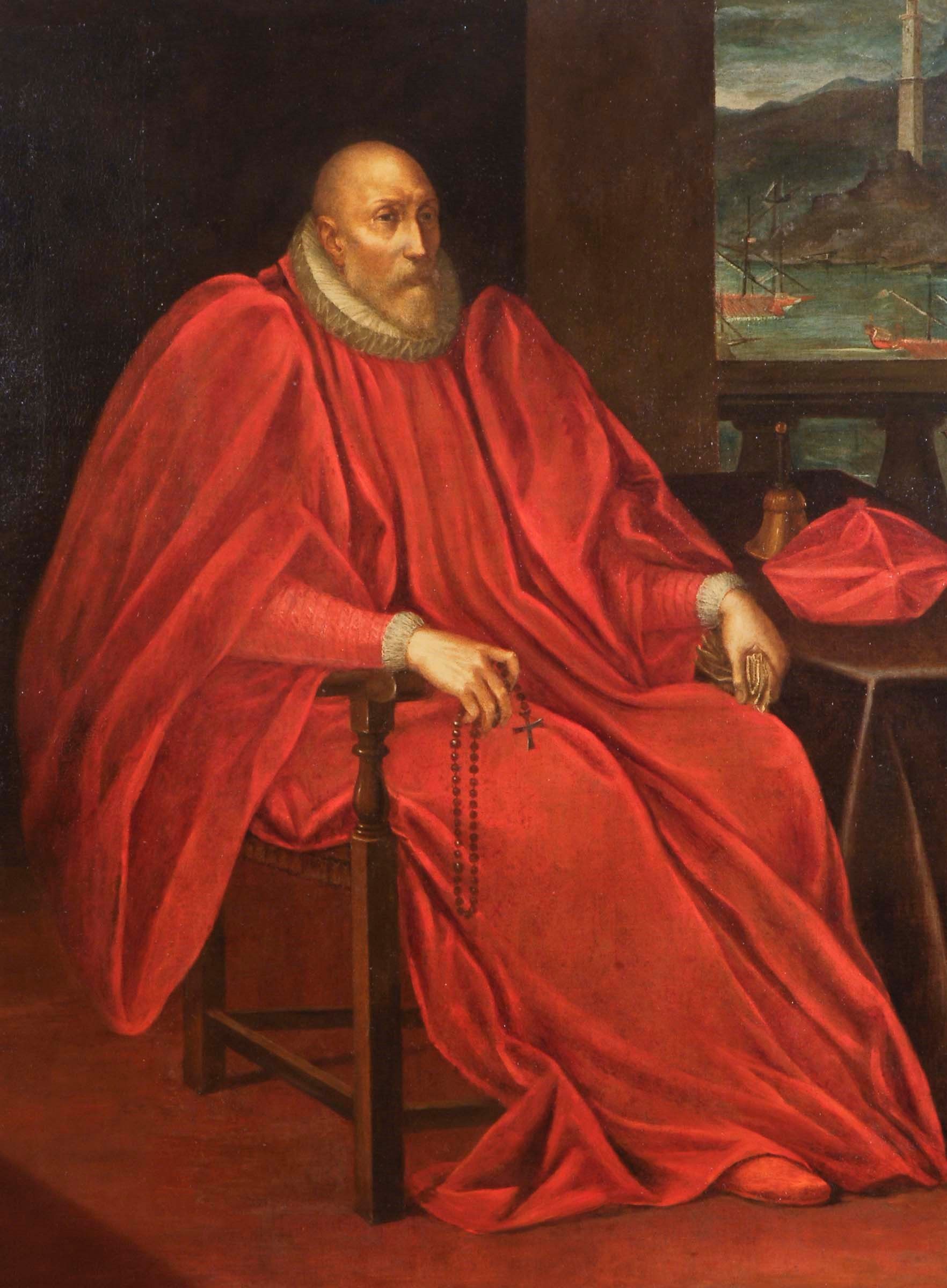
Simone Spinola, Doge of Genoa (1567–1569) by Andrea Semoni

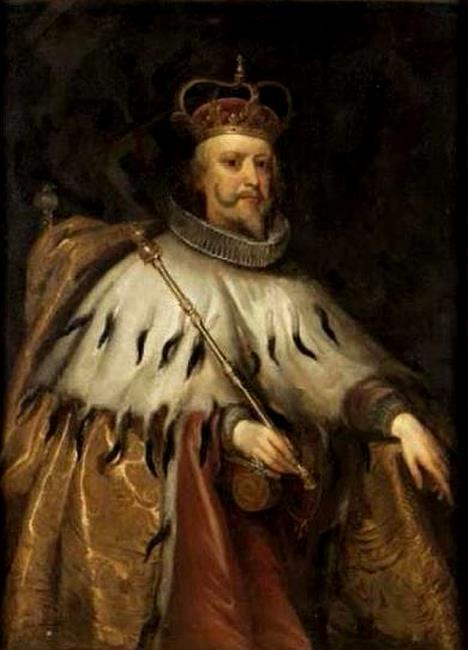
Luca Giustiniani, Doge of Genoa (1644–1646) by Jan Hovaert

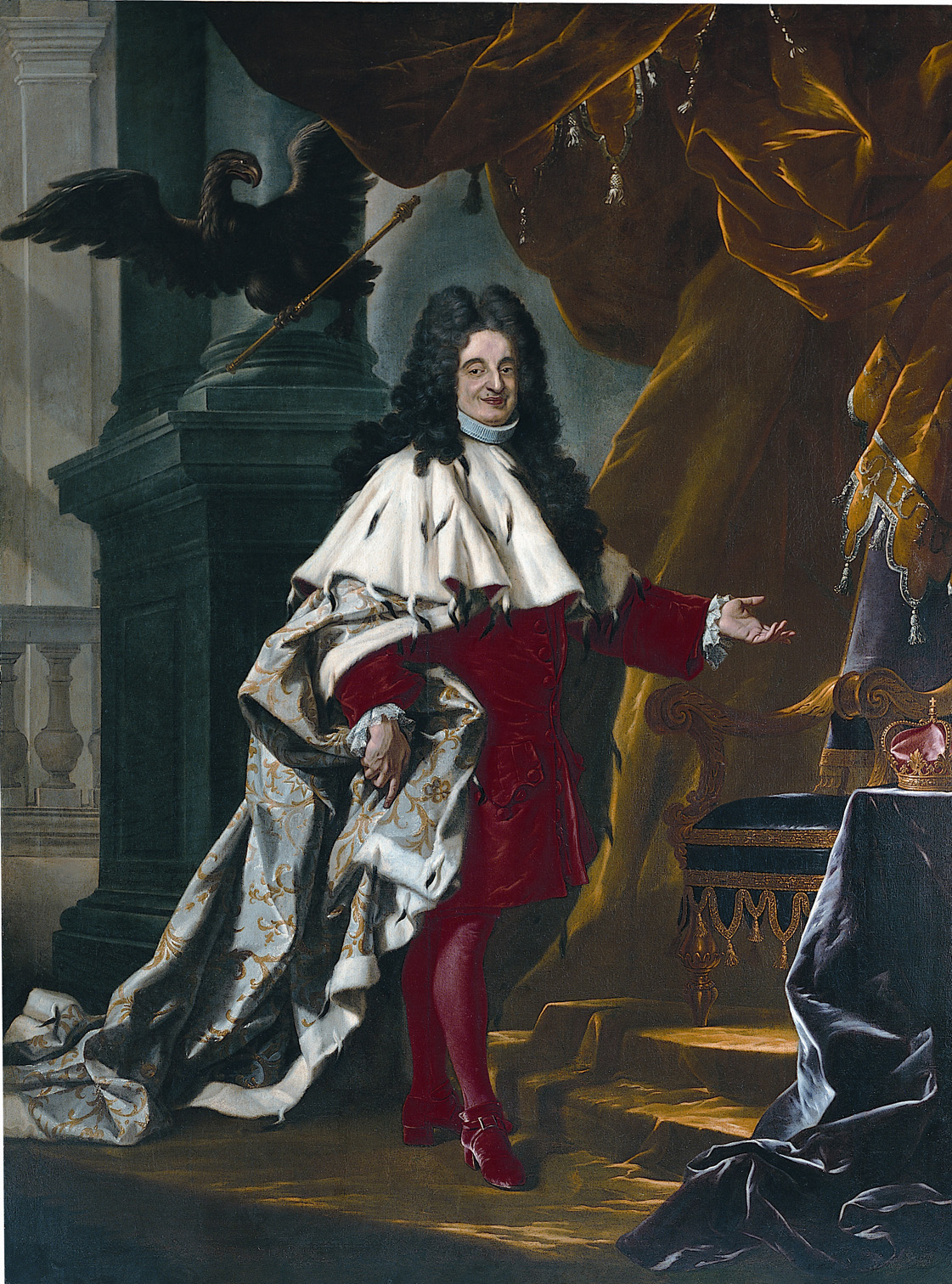
Francesco Maria Imperiale, Doge of Genoa (1711–1713) by Giovanni Maria delle Piane

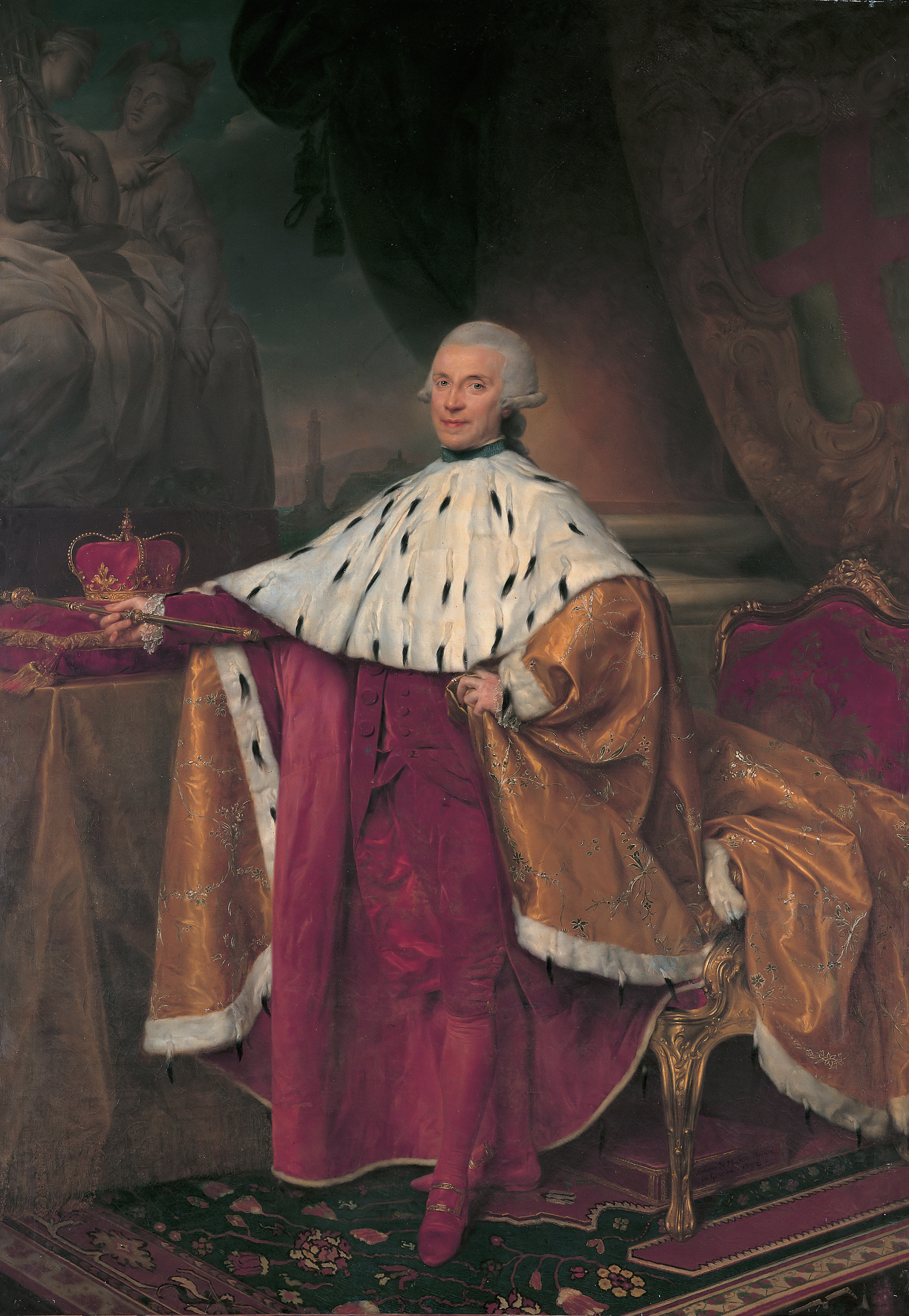
Michelangelo Cambiaso, Doge of Genoa (1791–1793) by Anton von Maron

== See also ==
- Doge of Amalfi
- Doge of Genoa
- Doge of Venice
