= Federico De Franchi Toso =

Doge of the Republic of Genoa and king of Corsica

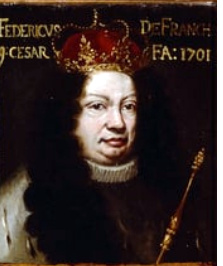

136th Doge of the Republic of Genoa
- In office 7 June 1701 – 7 June 1703
- Preceded by: Girolamo De Mari
- Succeeded by: Antonio Grimaldi

Personal details
- Born: 1642 Genoa, Republic of Genoa
- Died: 1734 (aged 91–92) Genoa, Republic of Genoa

Federico De Franchi Toso (Genoa, 1642 – Genoa, 1734) was the 136th Doge of the Republic of Genoa and king of Corsica.

== Biography ==
Son of Cesare Franchi de Candia and grandson of the homonymous Federico De Franchi Toso, nephew of Gerolamo and Giacomo, Federico was born in Genoa around 1642. On 7 June 1701 the Grand Council appointed him new doge of Genoa, the ninety-first in two-year succession and the one hundred and thirty-sixth in republican history. As doge he was also invested with the related biennial office of king of Corsica. There are no known details or main facts of his two-year mandate which ended, as by natural expiry, on 7 June 1703. Federico De Franchi served the Genoese state in the role of head of the magistrates of the Inquisitors and of the War and protector of the Collegio del Bene. De Franchi Toso died in 1734.

== See also ==
- Republic of Genoa
- Doge of Genoa

== Sources ==
- Buonadonna, Sergio. Rosso doge. I dogi della Repubblica di Genova dal 1339 al 1797.
