= Giovanni Francesco Brignole Sale =

Giovanni Francesco Brignole Sale may refer to:

- Giovanni Francesco I Brignole Sale (1582–1637), Doge of Genoa
- Giovanni Francesco II Brignole Sale (1695–1760), Doge of Genoa
