= Giacomo Filippo Durazzo =

Italian naturalist

Giacomo Filippo Durazzo III (1729–1812) was the head of the wealthiest 18th-century family in Genoa, Italy, and a notable naturalist and bibliophile. He was instrumental in organizing the natural history collections in the University of Genoa and the city's Civic Museum of Natural History.

Durazzo was born 3 March 1729 in Genoa, the son of Marcello Durazzo (1703–1787) and Clelia Durazzo (1709–1782). His descendants include Clelia Durazzo Grimaldi and Ignazio Alessandro Pallavicini, both naturalists in their own right. He was also a patron and supporter of Genoa's emergent scientific community, hosting encounters and seminars between the city's leading academics, including university reformer Giovanni Antonio Mongiardini, chemist Cesare Nicolò Canefri, and British physician William Batt.

Over the course of 30 years, Durazzo collected more than 4,000 books, as well as many specimens of minerals, fossils, shells, physical and electrical devices, etc. In the 1780s Durazzo established a natural history cabinet and a laboratory in his private villa of Cornigliano. Its collection was documented by English botanist James Edward Smith in 1787, but after Durazzo's death, it was not preserved.
