= Giovanni Battista Lercari =

Giovanni Battista Lercari may refer to:

- Giovanni Battista Lercari (1507–1592), Doge of Genoa 1563-1565
- Giovanni Battista Lercari (1576–1657), Doge of Genoa 1642-1644
