= Gerolamo De Franchi Toso =

Gerolamo De Franchi Toso may refer to:

- Gerolamo De Franchi Toso (1522–1586), Doge of Genoa
- Gerolamo De Franchi Toso (1585–1668), Doge of Genoa
