= Villa Loredan at Stra =

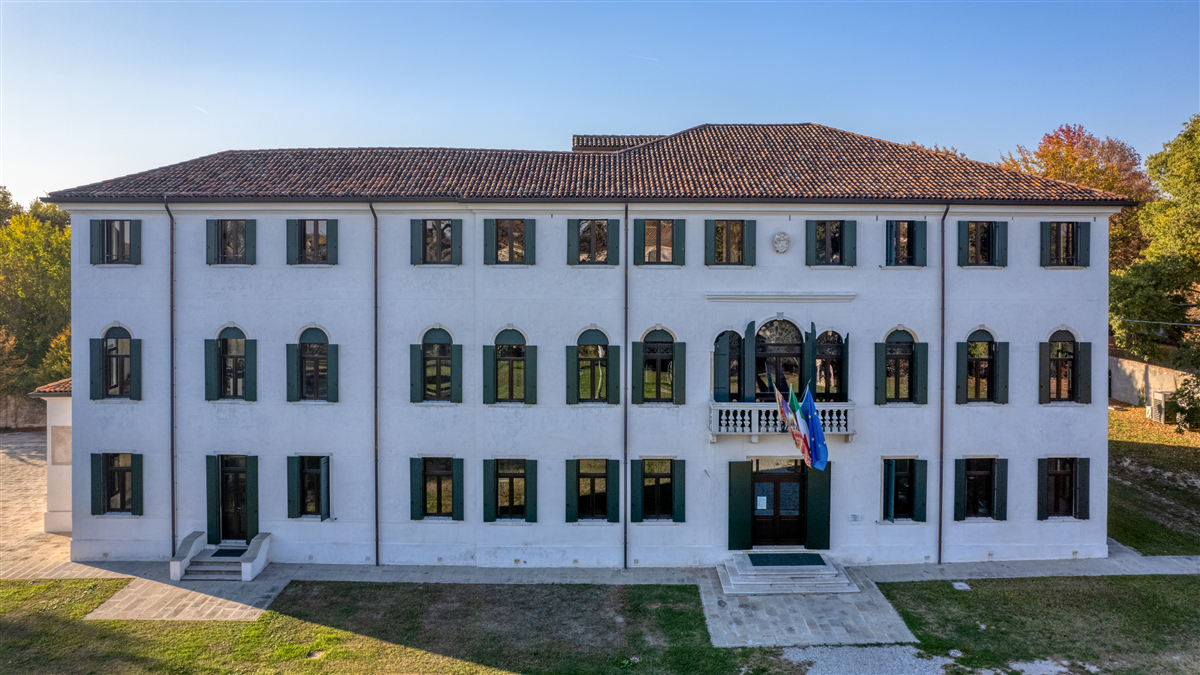
- Villa Loredan on the Brenta river
- Interactive map of the Villa Loredan at Stra area
- Etymology: by the Loredan family

General information
- Location: Via Roma 1, Stra, Italy
- Completed: early 16th century
- Renovated: 1754-1763, 2008-2019
- Affiliation: House of Loredan

Technical details
- Floor count: 3

The Villa Loredan at Stra is an early 16th-century villa of the noble Loredan family located in the town of Stra, on the Brenta river in the Veneto region of northeast Italy.

== History ==
Villa Loredan was originally part of a single property which included the opposite building, from which it is now separated by a wire fence. It was therefore a villa complex consisting of two symmetrical building blocks, separated by a courtyard and closed all around by a boundary wall, owned by the Venetian patrician Loredan family.

It was built in the very early years of the sixteenth century, with shapes and qualities capable of arousing the admiration of contemporaries. Originally the two buildings were called one "of the women" and the other "of the men".

With the election as Doge in 1752, Francesco Loredan decided to intervene on the villa to make it more in keeping with the rank and prestige achieved: between 1754 and 1763 the entire complex was then subjected to a radical reconstruction, implemented by reusing part of the ancient structures of sixteenth-century origin. The two new buildings, similar in size, had a distinct functional destination: the western one was reserved for the use of the master, the one to the east was for the use of the steward and other employees. Particular importance was given to the garden, which was built with great care.

A few years after the reconstruction, which cost about 35,600 lire, in 1767 the Santo Stefano branch of the Loredan family died out. In the absence of male heirs, the entire estate was the subject of numerous trials and clashes between heirs. Eventually, in 1777, most of the assets were assigned to Caterina Loredan, nephew of the doge, and then passed to her daughter Pisana.

In the early nineteenth century the villa passed to the Carminati family, to whom the coats of arms still present on the facade of the villa refer, which for the entire first half of the twentieth century remained in private possession. In 1959 the western building with the courtyard and the orchard (the current Villa Loredan) was sold to the Institute for the Training and Improvement of Workers, which designated the building as a training center for industrial workers. Between 1966 and 1967 it became the property of the municipality of Stra which, from then until the early 1980s, used it as a middle school. In June 1968 the municipality prepared an overall restoration project that proved too expensive for the municipal coffers and of which a first executive excerpt was carried out.

In 1972 there were some collapses of ceilings on the second floor of the building, which required the reconstruction and painting of the parts that were in danger or already collapsed. Finally, in 1989, the external park was rearranged.

From the eighties and until the early nineties the villa was the seat of the Consortium of Footwear Designers which made Stra and the Riviera del Brenta famous for quality footwear; from the nineties until the beginning of the 2000s it was the seat of the Municipal Library.

From 15 May 2019 Villa Loredan is used as the Municipal Headquarters.

== Restoration ==
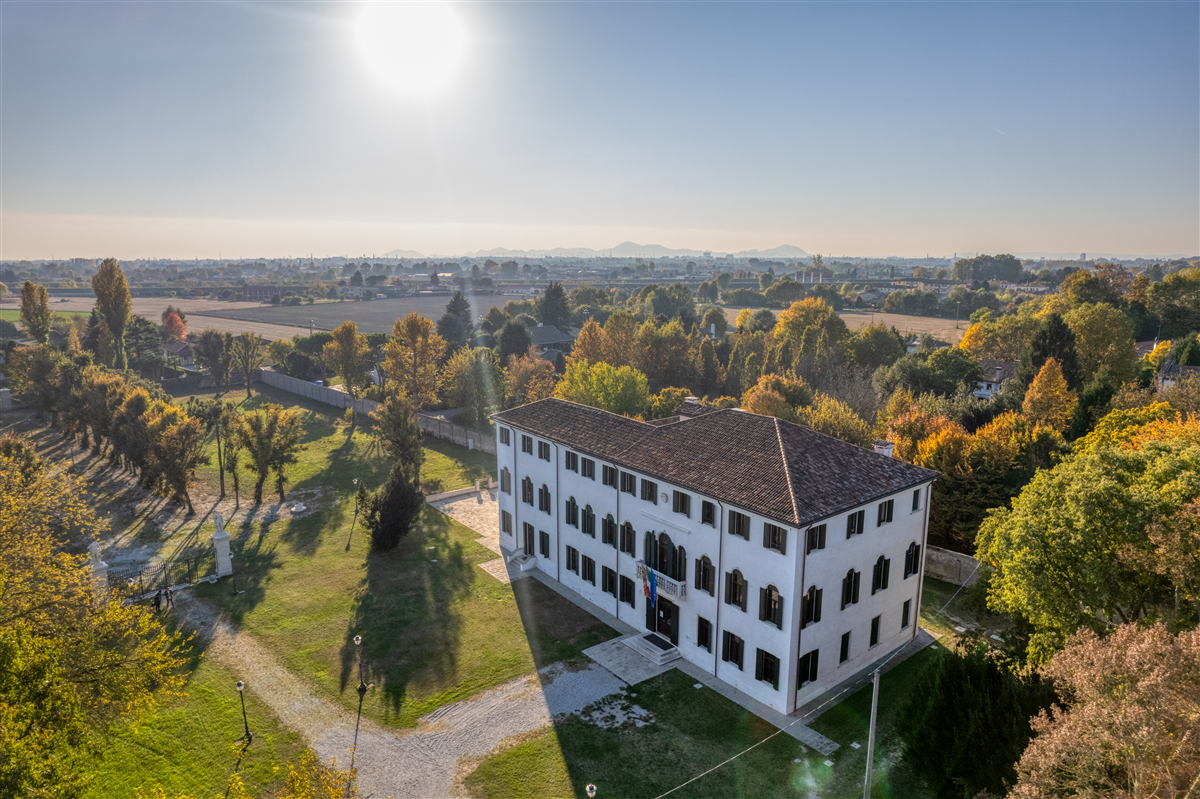
Aerial view of the Villa.

Villa Loredan is located in Stra, on the right bank of the Brenta river, in front of the large park of Villa Pisani, located on the left bank. Since 1966 the building has been owned by the municipality; in 2001 the Town Council of Stra decided to restore it and to transfer the municipal seat to it; in February 2008 the restoration works began which, after the consolidation of the floors and the roof, for an amount equal to €1,529,760.75, were interrupted in December 2010; the termination of the contract with the contractor was in March 2011.

Animated by the iron will to complete the intervention, in 2014 the municipal administration participated in a tender from the Veneto Region, proposing the intervention of "Restoration and conservative rehabilitation of Villa Loredan - Completion works", for a total amount of €1,800,000.00, obtaining a loan of €1,000,000.00 from the Veneto Development and Cohesion Fund, falling within the National Strategic Framework financed with EU and national funds.

In December 2015, the procedures for awarding the definitive restoration work began, which ended in the summer of 2018.

Thanks to a careful restoration work and to the mastery of the restorers, the interiors of the historic building have been restored to their ancient splendor: of particular value are the polychrome stuccos that adorn the walls and ceilings, the Venetian terrazzo floors, the wrought iron railing of the monumental staircase with four flights, the mirrors with the original polychrome leaded glass of the windows of the hall on the noble floor.

On 2 October 2018, further restoration work began on the walls on the second floor and the external courtyard south of the building, for an amount of €265,000.00, the completion of which was scheduled for January 2019. In May 2019 the transfer of the municipal offices to Villa Loredan took place.

With further funding, the villa will be furnished with furniture suitable for the public use of a monumental historical asset.

A "Restoration and enhancement of the park of Villa Loredan" is also planned, for a total amount of €250,000.00 aimed at the recovery and enhancement of the public park of the Villa, in particular the stone portals with the statues above and of wrought iron gates, as well as part of the surrounding walls, which will make it possible to return to the community a historical-artistic heritage of inestimable beauty.

The building, whose history is closely linked to that of the noble Venetian Loredan family, who gave three doges to the Republic of Venice, plays a leading role in the panorama of Venetian villas.
