= William Batt =

William Batt may refer to:

- William Batt (architect) (1840–1910), architect based in Belfast
- William Batt (doctor) (1744–1812), English doctor and author
- William Loren Batt (1882–1964), American mechanical engineer

== See also ==
- Batt (surname)
