= Girolamo De Mari =

Doge of the Republic of Genoa and king of Corsica

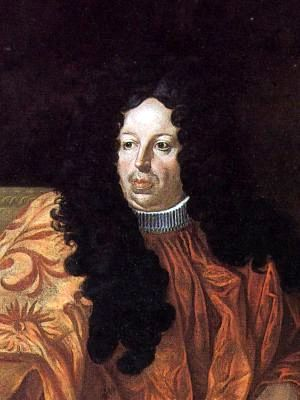

135th Doge of the Republic of Genoa
- In office June 3, 1699 – June 3, 1701
- Preceded by: Francesco Maria Sauli
- Succeeded by: Federico De Franchi Toso

Personal details
- Born: December 1644 Genoa, Republic of Genoa
- Died: May 3, 1702 (aged 57) Genoa, Republic of Genoa

Girolamo De Mari (Genoa, December 1644 - Genoa, May 3, 1702) was the 135th Doge of the Republic of Genoa and king of Corsica.

== Biography ==
The sudden death of the doge in office Francesco Maria Sauli on May 26, 1699, who died about four months before the natural expiry of the mandate, led to an early meeting of the members of the Grand Council (June 3) who majority chose De Mari as his successor: the ninetieth in biennial succession and the one hundred and thirty-fifth in republican history. As doge he was also invested with the related biennial office of king of Corsica. The Republic of Genoa, which declared itself "hardly" neutral even in the subsequent phases that led to the Spanish Succession War, by order of Doge De Mari could not deny the passage of four French battalions in its Genoese territories. After his term of office ended on 3 June 1701, he again held state offices. De Mari died on May 3, 1702, at the age of 58.

== See also ==
- Republic of Genoa
- Doge of Genoa
