= Giovanni Agostino De Marini =

Doge of the Republic of Genoa and king of Corsica

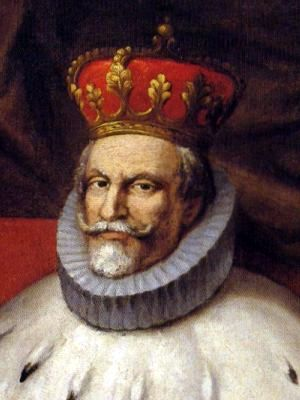

105th Doge of the Republic of Genoa
- In office 14 August 1641 – 19 June 1642
- Preceded by: Giovanni Battista Durazzo
- Succeeded by: Giovanni Battista Lercari

Personal details
- Born: 1572 Genoa, Republic of Genoa
- Died: 19 June 1642 (aged 69–70) Genoa, Republic of Genoa

Giovanni Agostino De Marini (1572 in Genoa – 19 June 1642 in Genoa) was the 105th Doge of the Republic of Genoa and king of Corsica.

== Biography ==
On 14 August 1641, De Marini was elected Doge of Genoa, the sixtieth in biennial succession and the one hundred and fifth in republican history. As doge, he was also invested with the related biennial office of king of Corsica. Elected probably thanks to the votes of the "new" nobility, which required greater relevance in the European political landscape and a rearmament policy to guarantee the protection of the rivers. He allocated the funds for the construction of twenty galleys and, following the example of the former doge Giacomo Lomellini and Anton Giulio Brignole Sale, he armed one with his money. His political goal was also to improve the relationship between Genoa city and his domain, and therefore, he went to Savona to deliver the two galleys prepared by the city. His dogal assignment was interrupted by the illness, which, after a month, on 19 June 1642, led to his death.

== See also ==
- Republic of Genoa
- Doge of Genoa
