= Francesco Invrea =

Doge of the Republic of Genoa and king of Corsica

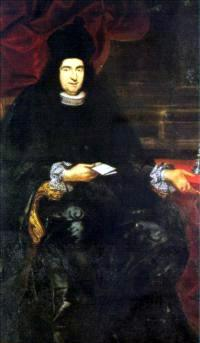

132nd Doge of the Republic of Genoa
- In office September 9, 1693 – September 9, 1695
- Preceded by: Giovanni Battista Cattaneo Della Volta
- Succeeded by: Bendinelli Negrone

Personal details
- Born: 1641 Genoa, Republic of Genoa
- Died: 1723 (aged 81–82) Genoa, Republic of Genoa

Francesco Invrea (Genoa, 1641 – Genoa, 1723) was the 132nd Doge of the Republic of Genoa and king of Corsica.

== Biography ==
His dogate was internally characterized by normal administrative activity and, on the other hand, it was in foreign policy that Doge Invrea had to juggle contrasts and problems, especially in economic terms. During the mandate of Francesco Invrea, moreover, the archbishop of Genoa Giulio Vincenzo Gentile died in June or July 1694 who, compared to his predecessor Giambattista Spinola, gave life in his episcopate to a more fruitful "religious collaboration" with the Republic of Genoa. At the end of the two-year period, he left his residence in the Doge's Palace on 9 September 1695 to retire to private life. He was appointed perpetual prosecutor by the body of supreme syndicators. He died in Genoa in 1723.

== See also ==
- Republic of Genoa
- Doge of Genoa

== Sources ==
- Buonadonna, Sergio. Rosso doge. I dogi della Repubblica di Genova dal 1339 al 1797.
