= Nicolò Spinola =

Doge of the Republic of Genoa and king of Corsica

155th Doge of the Republic of Genoa
- In office 16 February 1740 – 16 February 1742
- Preceded by: Costantino Balbi
- Succeeded by: Domenico Canevaro

Personal details
- Born: 1677 Genoa, Republic of Genoa
- Died: 1743 (aged 65–66) Genoa, Republic of Genoa

Nicolò Spinola (1677 in Genoa – 1743 in Genoa) was the 155th Doge of the Republic of Genoa and king of Corsica.

== Biography ==
Spinola was appointed doge of Genoa in the election of 16 February 1740, the one hundred and tenth in biennial succession and the one hundred and fifty-fifth in republican history. As doge he was also invested with the related biennial office of king of Corsica. When the dogal office ceased on 16 February 1742, Nicolò Spinola retired to private life, and died during 1743.

== See also ==
- Republic of Genoa
- Doge of Genoa
- House of Spinola
