= Alessandro Spinola =

Republic of Genoa politician (1589–1665)

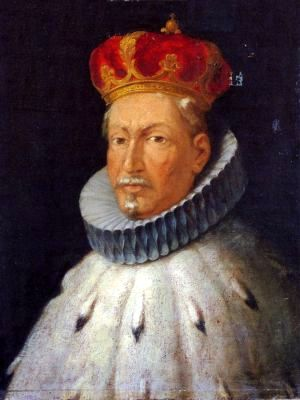

112th Doge of the Republic of Genoa
- In office 9 October 1654 – 9 October 1656
- Preceded by: Gerolamo De Franchi Toso
- Succeeded by: Giulio Sauli

Personal details
- Born: 1589 Genoa, Republic of Genoa
- Died: 1665 (aged 75–76) Genoa, Republic of Genoa

Alessandro Spinola (Genoa, 1589 - Genoa, 1665) was the 112th Doge of the Republic of Genoa and king of Corsica.

== Biography ==
Born in Genoa in 1589 and member of the Spinola family, the figure of Alessandro Spinola was chosen at the age of 23 to pay homage from the Republic of Genoa to the ambassador of the Spanish court and also to assist him in his Genoese stay. Around 1614 he assumed his first state office as protector of poor prisoners and, subsequently, in the magistrate of the Extraordinary.

Before the office of senator of the Republic, he held other state offices as protector of the sea, captain of Rapallo and to the magistrate of Moneta or, again, in Bank of Saint George.

=== Dogate ===
He was elected doge on 9 October 1654: the sixty-seventh in biennial succession and the one hundred and twelfth in republican history. As doge he was also invested with the related biennial office of king of Corsica.

Among the events of his dogato is recorded in the annals the fight against piracy along the Ligurian coast, the continuation of the work of the Albergo dei Poveri in Genoa and a new plague epidemic that decimated the Genoese population and the nearby villages. He ended his term on 9 October 1656.

=== Death ===
He died in Genoa during 1665 and was buried inside the church of San Francesco di Castelletto.

== See also ==
- Doge of Genoa
- Republic of Genoa
