= Bendinelli Negrone =

Doge of the Republic of Genoa and King of Corsica

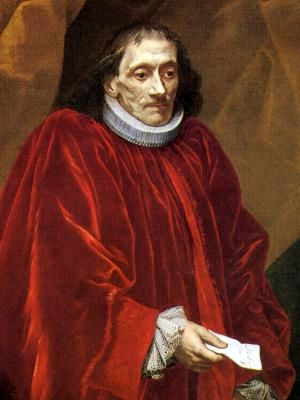

133rd Doge of the Republic of Genoa
- In office September 16, 1695 – September 16, 1697
- Preceded by: Francesco Invrea
- Succeeded by: Francesco Maria Sauli

Personal details
- Born: 1627 Genoa, Republic of Genoa
- Died: 1707 (aged 79–80) Genoa, Republic of Genoa

Bendinelli Negrone (Genoa, 1627 - Genoa, 1707) was the 133rd Doge of the Republic of Genoa and King of Corsica, Cyprus and Jerusalem.

== Biography ==
His Dogate, the eighty-eighth in biennial succession and the one hundred and thirty-third in republican history, marked the end of the conflicts with the Order of malta, on the approval of Pope Innocent XII, allowing many Genoese nobles and patricians to enter the chivalric order. And in 1696, the important donation by his family of the "insignia of power" to be affixed to the statue of the Madonna located at the time inside the Genoa Cathedral and then in the Bank of Saint George. Negrone's mandate ended on September 16, 1697. He died in Genoa in 1707.

== See also ==
- Republic of Genoa
- Doge of Genoa
