= Giovanni Battista Lomellini =

Doge of the Republic of Genoa and king of Corsica

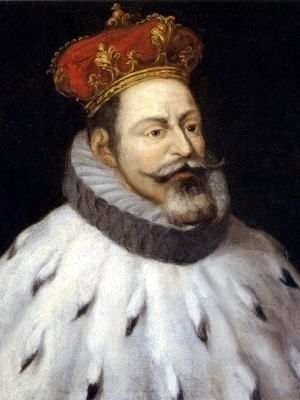

108th Doge of the Republic of Genoa
- In office 24 July 1646 – 24 July 1648
- Preceded by: Luca Giustiniani
- Succeeded by: Giacomo De Franchi Toso

Personal details
- Born: 1594 Genoa, Republic of Genoa
- Died: 1674 (aged 79–80) Genoa, Republic of Genoa

Giovanni Battista Lomellini (Genoa, 1594 – Genoa, 1674) was the 108th Doge of the Republic of Genoa and king of Corsica.

== Biography ==
His two-year mandate, considered by historians to be quiet and normal, was marked by his gout, which on various occasions prevented him from presiding over public ceremonies. During this period, the Oratory of Saint Philip Neri took over in Genoa. At the end of his mandate, on 24 July 1648, the commission of the supreme syndicators expressed his favorable vote for the appointment of Giovanni Battista Lomellini as perpetual procurator for the rest of his life. He died in Genoa around 1674.

== See also ==
- Republic of Genoa
- Doge of Genoa

== Sources ==
- Buonadonna, Sergio. Rosso doge. I dogi della Repubblica di Genova dal 1339 al 1797.
