= Giovanni Battista Centurione =

Doge of the Republic of Genoa and king of Corsica

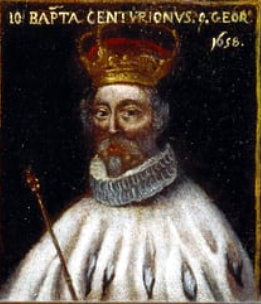

114th Doge of the Republic of Genoa
- In office October 15, 1658 – October 15, 1660
- Preceded by: Giulio Sauli
- Succeeded by: Gian Bernardo Frugoni

Personal details
- Born: 1603 Genoa, Republic of Genoa
- Died: 1692 (aged 88–89) Genoa, Republic of Genoa

Giovanni Battista Centurione (Genoa, 1603 - Genoa, 1692) was the 114th Doge of the Republic of Genoa and king of Corsica.

== Biography ==
Centurione's dogal election, the sixty-ninth in biennial succession and the one hundred and fourteenth in republican history, which took place on October 15, 1658, was first decided by the 1237 Genoese nobles and no longer by the 400 representatives of the Grand Council of the Republic. As doge he was also invested with the related biennial office of king of Corsica. During his mandate he was tolerant and protected the Jews with the granting of free trade in Genoa, despite the strong frictions with the Catholic Church and the Inquisition. He ceased office on October 15, 1660. Centurione died in Genoa in 1692.

== See also ==
- Republic of Genoa
- Doge of Genoa
