= Domenico Canevaro =

Doge of the Republic of Genoa and king of Corsica

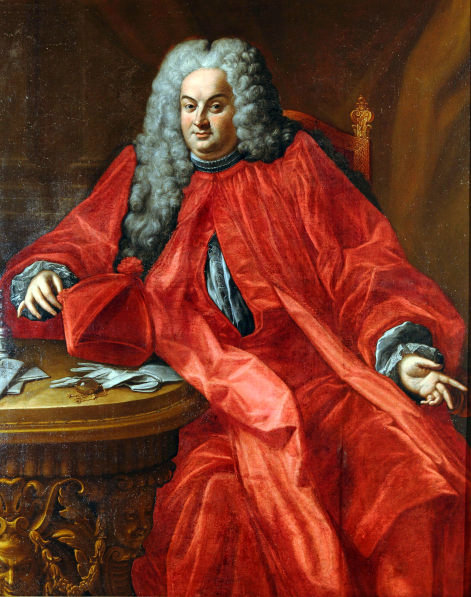

156th Doge of the Republic of Genoa
- In office 20 February 1742 – 20 February 1744
- Preceded by: Nicolò Spinola
- Succeeded by: Lorenzo De Mari

Personal details
- Born: 5 August 1683 Genoa, Republic of Genoa
- Died: 15 February 1745 (aged 61) Genoa, Republic of Genoa

Domenico Canevaro (Genoa, 5 August 1683 – Genoa, 15 February 1745) was the 156th Doge of the Republic of Genoa and king of Corsica.

== Biography ==
Canevaro was appointed with a considerable majority of votes in the election to the Doge's office of 20 February 1742, the one hundred and eleventh in biennial succession and the one hundred and fifty-sixth in republican history. As doge he was also invested with the related biennial office of king of Corsica. At his coronation in the Cathedral of San Lorenzo, on 7 July 1742, the ceremony was officiated by Monsignor Agostino Saluzzo, bishop of the Diocese of Mariana and Accia. At the end of the two-year period on 20 February 1744, the former doge retired to private life. Newly elected deputy for maritime affairs, he died in Genoa on 15 February 1745.

== See also ==
- Republic of Genoa
- Doge of Genoa
