= Lorenzo De Mari =

Doge of the Republic of Genoa

157th Doge of the Republic of Genoa
- In office February 1, 1744 – February 1, 1746
- Preceded by: Domenico Canevaro
- Succeeded by: Giovanni Francesco II Brignole Sale

Personal details
- Born: 1685 Genoa, Republic of Genoa
- Died: April 16, 1772 (aged 86–87) Genoa, Republic of Genoa

Lorenzo De Mari (Genoa, 1685 - Genoa, April 16, 1772) was the 157th Doge of the Republic of Genoa and king of Corsica.

== Biography ==
Grandson of the Doge Stefano De Mari, and member of the noble De Mari family, he was born in Genoa during the year of 1685. Lorenzo De Mari was officially crowned Doge of the Republic on July 18 in the Cathedral of Genoa, the religious and civil ceremony was officiated by Gerolamo Della Torre, his personal friend and celebrant by express will of the neo doge. When the dogal office ceased on 1 February 1746, the "deeply religious" De Mari was identified by the government as the implementer of a special and extraordinary 25% taxation plan on the Church's assets to compensate for war expenses and possibly "vigorously in perpetuity ". And it was also the former doge who promoted in the ecclesiastical circles donations and voluntary contributions of religious orders to the war cause of the Republic. De Mari died in Genoa on February 16, 1772.

== See also ==
- Republic of Genoa
- Doge of Genoa
