= Giulio Sauli =

Doge of the Republic of Genoa

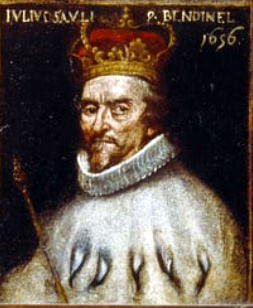

113th Doge of the Republic of Genoa
- In office October 12, 1656 – October 12, 1658
- Preceded by: Alessandro Spinola
- Succeeded by: Giovanni Battista Centurione

Personal details
- Born: 1578 Genoa, Republic of Genoa
- Died: 1668 (aged 89–90) Genoa, Republic of Genoa

Giulio Sauli (Genoa, 1578 – Genoa, 1668) was the 113th Doge of the Republic of Genoa and King of Corsica.

== History ==
A native of Genoa, in 1578 and exponent of the Lucchese Sauli family, he completed his studies in law in the Genoa which subsequently took him to various European countries such as France, Spain, the Swiss Confederacy and Flanders for further study. Back in the Genoese Republic, Giulio Sauli was involved in a judicial process for the public possession of a gun; despite being part of the nobility, he was sentenced to exile from Genoa for five years, a sentence he served in the island colony of Corsica.

Sauli returned to Genoa where at the age of 36 he had his first state posts in various offices and magistrates of the Republic of Genoa. Among these, between 1627 and 1629, also the appointment of governor of the Corsican island. Engaged in the purchases of the Bank of Saint George, Giulio Sauli was repeatedly elected senator.

He was elected doge on 12 October 1656, the sixty-eighth in two-year succession and the one hundred and thirteenth in republican history. As doge he was also invested with the correlated two-year office of king of Corsica.

Doge Giulio Sauli's two-year period was mainly marked by a new plague that affected the entire Ligurian region and which saw the interest of several nobles and the archbishop of Genoa Stefano Durazzo in works of charity and help to alleviate the sufferings of population. From his predecessor he "inherited" the works for the construction of the Albergo dei Poveri which, after a slowdown due to the outbreak of the disease, saw a new advancement of the work in its Dogate.

After the end of his mandate as Doge, on October 12, 1658, he continued to serve the Genoese state in other positions. He died in Genoa in 1668 and was buried inside the Basilica di Santa Maria Assunta.
