= Gerolamo De Franchi Toso (1585–1668) =

Doge of the Republic of Genoa and king of Corsica

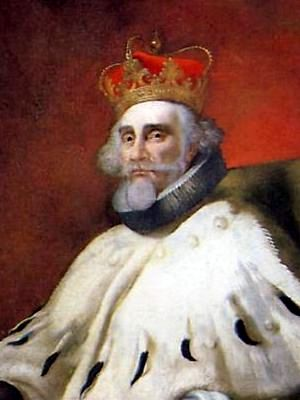

111th Doge of the Republic of Genoa
- In office 8 September 1652 – 8 September 1654
- Preceded by: Agostino Centurione
- Succeeded by: Alessandro Spinola

Personal details
- Born: 6 January 1585 Genoa, Republic of Genoa
- Died: 1668 (aged 82–83) Genoa, Republic of Genoa

Gerolamo De Franchi Toso (Genoa, 6 January 1585 - Genoa, 1668) was the 111th Doge of the Republic of Genoa and king of Corsica.

== Biography ==
Gerolamo De Franchi Toso was born in the Genoese capital on 6 January 1585. He is the son of Federico De Franchi Toso, doge of Genoa in the two years 1623–1625, and Maddalena Durazzo. In addition to his father, his younger brother Giacomo De Franchi Toso, with whom he had a strong political rivalry, his paternal grandfather Gerolamo De Franchi Toso and his maternal grandfather Giacomo Grimaldi Durazzo, were all Doges of the Republic of Genoa. On 8 September 1652 he managed to obtain the majority of the votes of the Grand Council for the election as doge, the sixty-sixth in biennial succession and the one hundred and eleventh in republican history. As doge he was also invested with the related biennial office of king of Corsica. Unlike the "softer" and "faithful respectful of the republican laws" of his brother Giacomo, the Dogate of Gerolamo De Franchi Toso was more "authoritarian" in his choices especially in matters of justice and "new undisputed sovereignty" of the Genoese republic. After his term of office on 8 September 1654, he had to wait two years before he was recognized as a perpetual procurator by the college of supreme syndicators. De Franchi Toso died in Genoa in 1668.

== See also ==
- Republic of Genoa
- Doge of Genoa
- Durazzo family
