= Giovanni Battista Durazzo =

Doge of the Republic of Genoa and king of Corsica

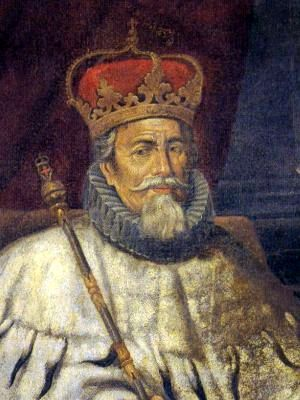

104th Doge of the Republic of Genoa
- In office July 28, 1639 – July 28, 1641
- Preceded by: Agostino Pallavicini
- Succeeded by: Giovanni Agostino De Marini

Personal details
- Born: 1565 Genoa, Republic of Genoa
- Died: May 28, 1642 (aged 76–77) Genoa, Republic of Genoa

Giovanni Battista Durazzo (Genoa, 1565 - Genoa, 28 May 1642) was the 104th Doge of the Republic of Genoa and king of Corsica. By birth, was member of the Durazzo family.

== Biography ==
Giovanni Battista Durazzo's dogate, the fifty-ninth in biennial succession and the one hundred and fourth in republican history, was inevitably conditioned by the mandate of his predecessor Agostino Pallavicini who, favoring a "naval rebirth" of the republic and more economic independence from the Spain of Philip IV, consequently, broke the relations between the two states, forcing the doge Durazzo, considered more traditional, to a new negotiation with the Spaniards.

Inside the Genoese borders, during his dogate, the construction of the Molo Nuovo proceeded: an important 17th-century port engineering work signed by Ansaldo De Mari.

After the dogal mandate ended on July 28, 1641, Giovanni Battista Durazzo was appointed among the perpetual prosecutors after the favorable ruling of the supreme trade unions to his work. He died in Genoa on May 28 of the same year. His body was buried inside the church of Nostra Signora della Consolazione.

== See also ==
- Doge of Genoa
- Republic of Genoa
- Durazzo family
