= Francesco Maria Sauli =

Doge of the Republic of Genoa and king of Corsica

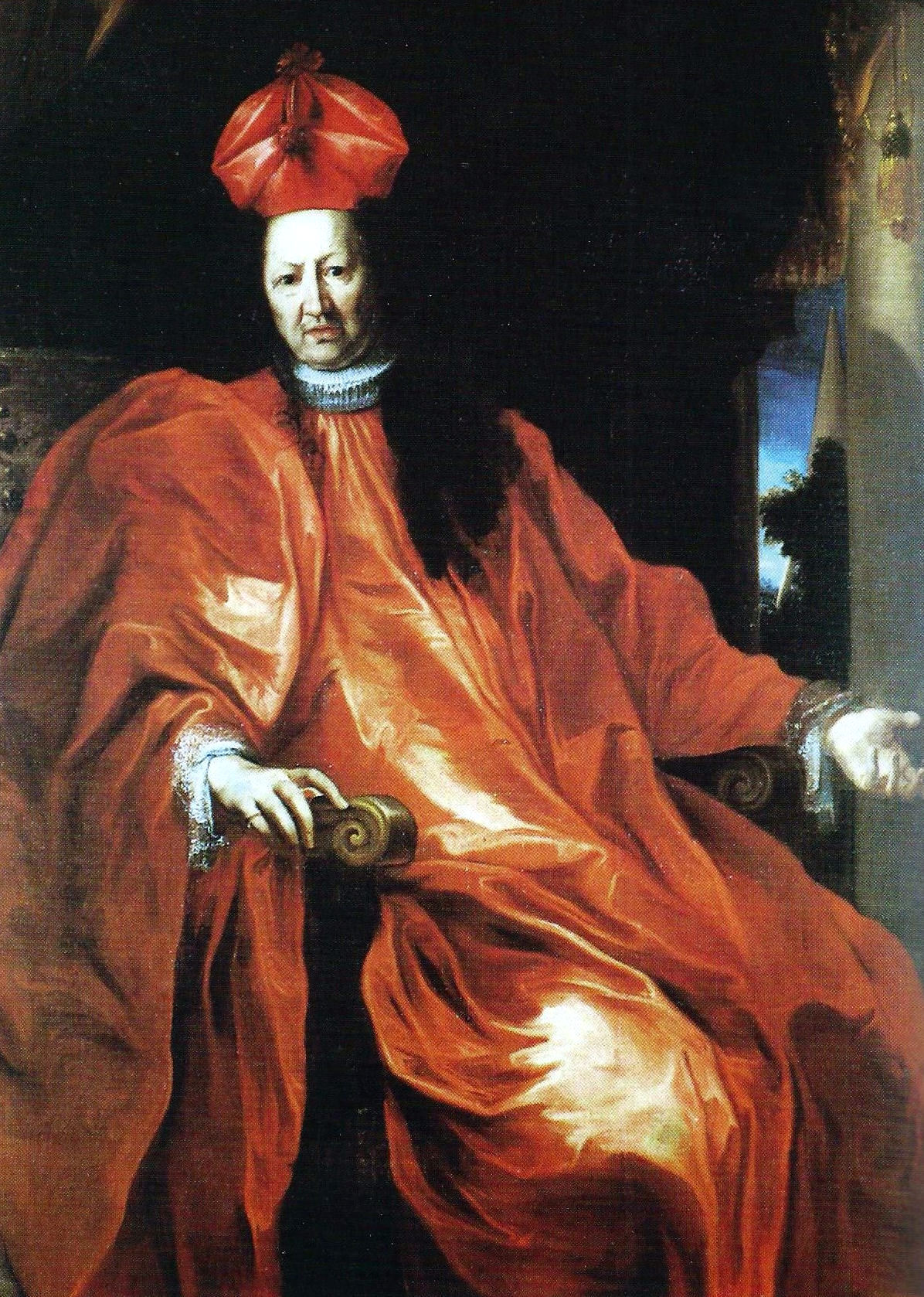

134th Doge of the Republic of Genoa
- In office September 19, 1697 – May 26, 1699
- Preceded by: Bendinelli Negrone
- Succeeded by: Girolamo De Mari

Personal details
- Born: 1620 Genoa, Republic of Genoa
- Died: May 26, 1699 (aged 78–79) Genoa, Republic of Genoa

Francesco Maria Sauli (Genoa, 1620 - Genoa, May 26, 1699) was the 134th Doge of the Republic of Genoa and king of Corsica.

== Biography ==
Grandson of the former doge Lorenzo Sauli, and third degree cousin of Saint Alexander Sauli, Francesco Maria Sauli was born in Genoa around 1620 and held multiple public offices. On September 19, 1697, at the age of 77, Sauli was elected as the doge of Genoa for a 2-year term. This made him the eighty-ninth doge to be elected for a 2-year term, and the one hundred and thirty-fourth in republican history.

As doge he was also invested with the related biennial office of king of Corsica. His two-year mandate was mainly based on public order, including a new regulation on the use of weapons. His sudden death on May 26, 1699, brought the natural expiration of the dogate earlier by about three months.

== See also ==
- Republic of Genoa
- Doge of Genoa
