= Agostino Centurione =

Doge of the Republic of Genoa and king of Corsica

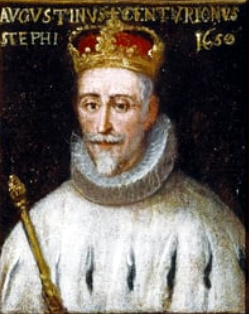

110th Doge of the Republic of Genoa
- In office 23 August 1650 – 23 August 1652
- Preceded by: Giacomo De Franchi Toso
- Succeeded by: Gerolamo De Franchi Toso

Personal details
- Born: 25 November 1584 Genoa, Republic of Genoa
- Died: 7 December 1657 (aged 73) Genoa, Republic of Genoa

Agostino Centurione (Genoa, 25 November 1584 - Genoa, 7 November 1657) was the 110th Doge of the Republic of Genoa and king of Corsica.

== Biography ==
His dogal mandate is remembered in the annals for the strong work of opposition and crushing of the ever more numerous gangs of brigands led, among others, also by exited Genoese patricians. Among the public works there is the large wall of the moat of San Tommaso useful for supplying water to the Lagaccio powder factory. After the end of the Dogate on 23 August 1652, he was appointed perpetual procurator, later dean of the Inquisitors of State and, in January 1653, dean of the war magistrate until 1654. In that year he resigned from office to definitively leave public life for religious life, a choice that his father had already taken as an elder entering the Barnabites order. After initial attempts to dissuade him from the action by his sister Vittoria, Agostino Centurione entered the Society of Jesus, carrying out his novitiate in Chieri. Centurione died in Genoa on 7 November 1657.

== See also ==
- Republic of Genoa
- Doge of Genoa

== Sources ==
- Buonadonna, Sergio. Rosso doge. I dogi della Repubblica di Genova dal 1339 al 1797.
