= Giacomo Durazzo =

Italian diplomat (1717–1794)

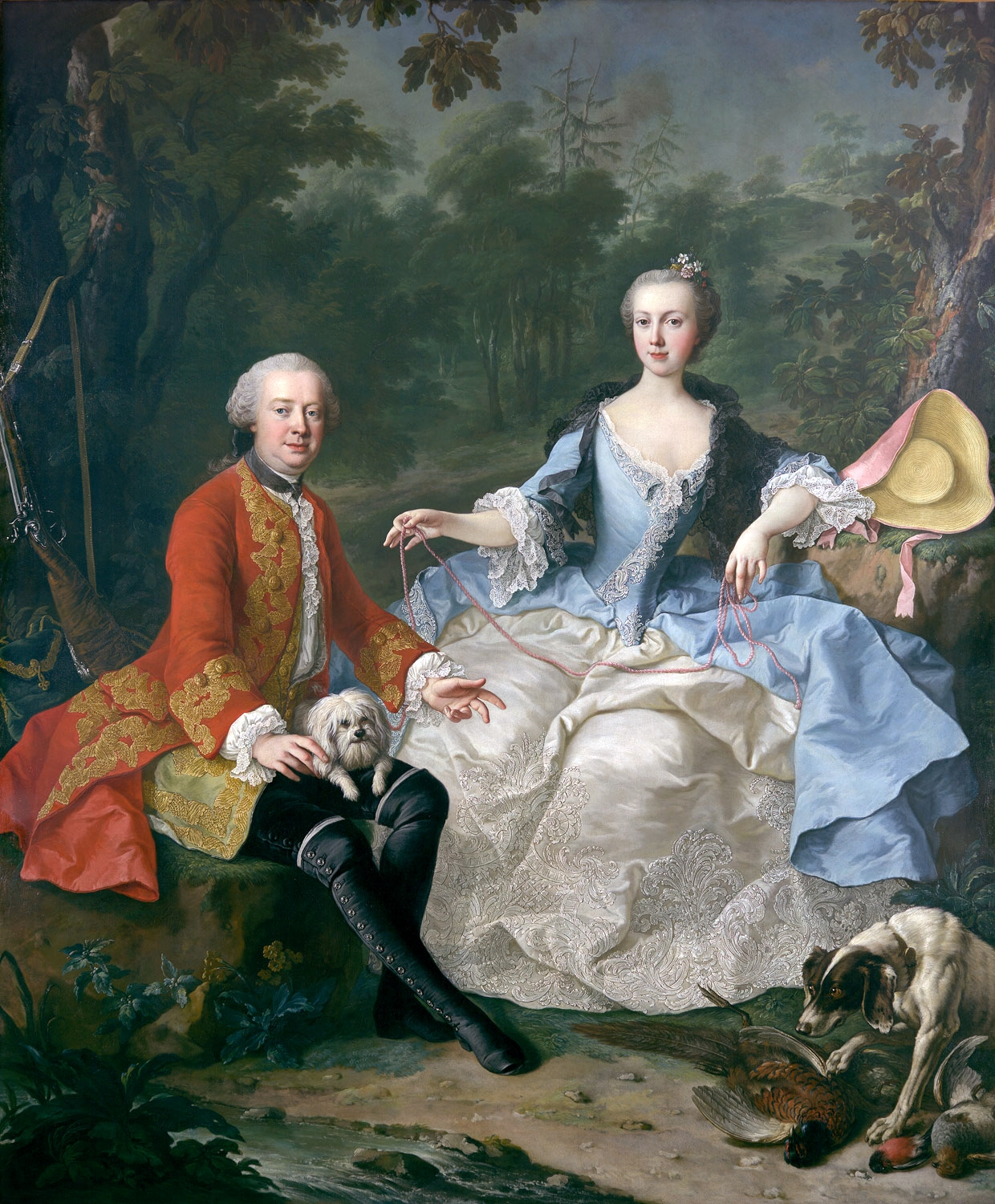
- Count and Countess Durazzo, painted by Martin van Meytens

Austrian ambassador to the Republic of Venice
- In office April 1764 – Summer 1784

Personal details
- Born: April 27, 1717 Genoa, Republic of Genoa
- Died: 15 October 1794 (aged 77) Venice, Republic of Venice
- Spouse: Ernestine Aloisia Ungnad von Weissenwolff (m. 1750; died 1794)

Count Giacomo Durazzo (27 April 1717 – 15 October 1794) was an Italian diplomat, art collector and man of the theatre. He is most famous for working with the composer Christoph Willibald Gluck on reforming Italian opera.

== Biography ==
=== Early life and career ===
He was born into the House of Durazzo, one of the most important aristocratic families in Genoa. His older brother was the doge Marcello Durazzo. In 1749 he was appointed Genoese ambassador at the court of Vienna, where in 1752 he became assistant to Count Ferenc Esterházy in the direction of Viennese theatrical affairs and, in 1754, sole directeur des spectacles. Though relations with the Empress Maria Theresa (1717–80) and her son, the future Emperor Joseph II (1741–90), were sometimes strained, Durazzo enjoyed the support of the minister Count Wenzel Anton Kaunitz and was able to use his position to reform the character of music and theatre at court. In 1750, he married the eighteen-year-old Countess Ernestine Aloisia Ungnad von Weissenwolff (1732–1794).

Durazzo was responsible for inviting the composer Christoph Willibald Gluck to Vienna in 1754 and played a central part in the development of his Orfeo ed Euridice, performed in 1762, and the first great Neoclassical opera seria.

=== Ambassador in Venice ===
When court intrigues caused Durazzo to resign his post, Kaunitz arranged for him to become, in April 1764, the ambassador of the Court of Vienna in Venice, where he embarked upon a new career as a collector of art. Acting from 1774 to 1776 as agent for Albert Casimir, Duke of Teschen and subsequently on his own behalf, Durazzo became one of the most important print collectors of the 18th century. He followed a systematic collecting policy and organized his collection on the principle that prints served the study of the history of painting. Examples were grouped into schools (the Italian, divided into Florentine–Roman, Venetian, Lombard and Bolognese; the northern German; Dutch–Flemish, or belgica; French; English), accompanied by biographies of artists and supplemented by three separate indexes for reference and cross-reference.

Realizing that the works of early painters would not otherwise be included, Durazzo commissioned some 50 engravings of paintings by artists from Cimabue to Perugino in the Uffizi Gallery in Florence, which he hoped would set an example to other art lovers. Durazzo collected some 30,000 prints and compiled 1400 biographies. His assistants included the Viennese engraver Jakob Schmutzer (1733–1811) and Conte Bartolomeo Benincasa. His work forms the basis of the present Albertina collection in Vienna. Durazzo died in Venice on 15 October 1794, aged 77.
