= Giovanni Francesco II Brignole Sale =

Doge of the Republic of Genoa and king of Corsica

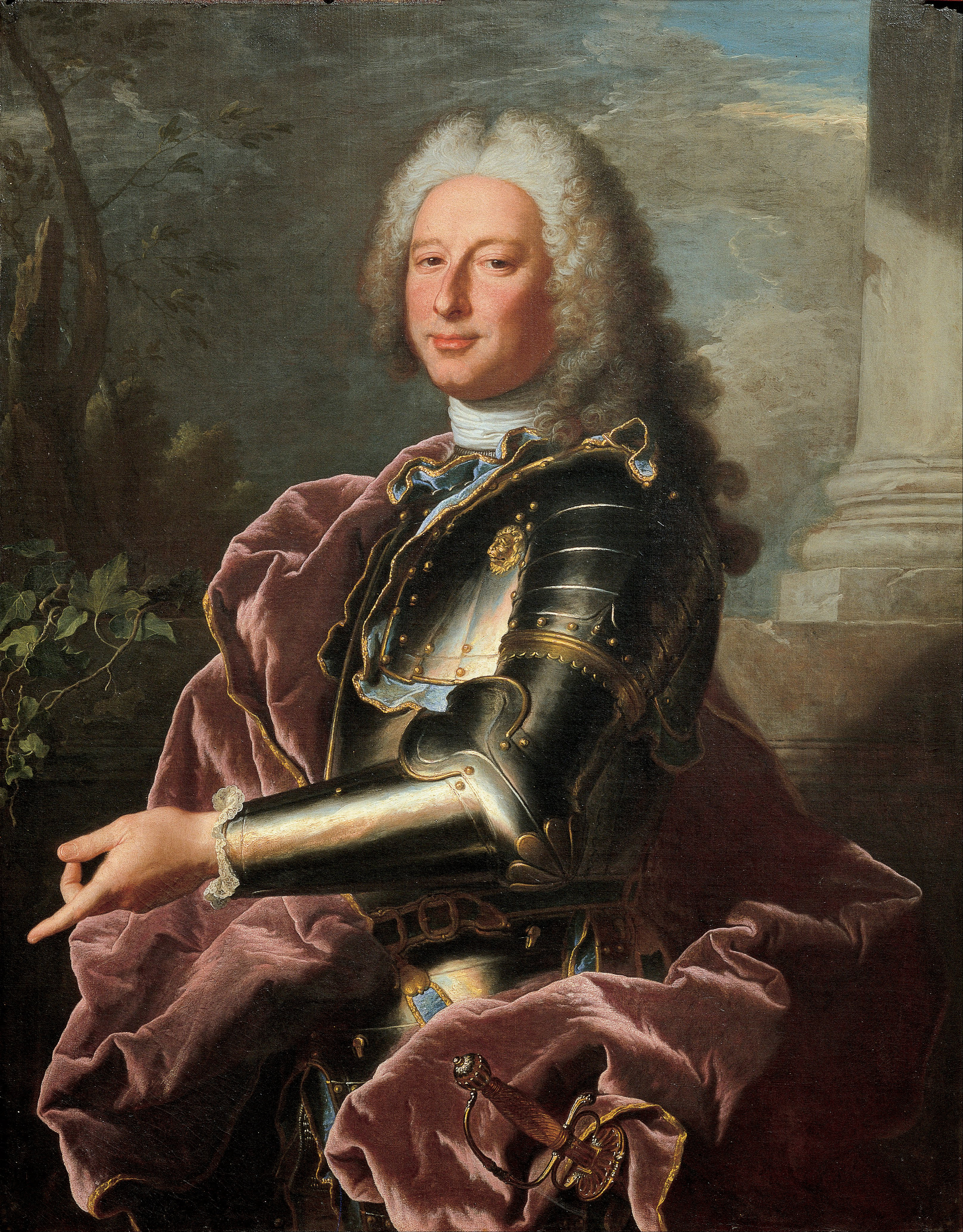
- Portrait by Hyacinthe Rigaud (1739)

158th Doge of the Republic of Genoa
- In office March 3, 1746 – March 3, 1748
- Preceded by: Lorenzo De Mari
- Succeeded by: Cesare Cattaneo Della Volta

Personal details
- Born: July 6, 1695 Genoa, Republic of Genoa
- Died: February 14, 1760 (aged 64) Genoa, Republic of Genoa

Giovanni Francesco II Brignole Sale (Genoa, 6 July 1695 - Genoa, 14 February 1760), was the 158th Doge of the Republic of Genoa and the last king of Corsica.

== Biography ==
Gian Francesco was the eldest son of Anton Giulio II Brignole Sale, 5th Marquess of Groppoli, and Isabella Brignole. He belonged to the illustrious Brignole family who had already offered a doge to Genoa, his namesake Giovanni Francesco I Brignole Sale, in 1635. Brignole Sale had three brothers, Gian Giacomo, Giuseppe and Rodolfo Emilio, the last of whom also served as doge.

He completed his education at the Collegio Tolomei, in Siena. Brignole Sale was elected Doge in 1746, during his mandate the Treaty of Aix-la-Chapelle brought the borders of the Republic back to the status quo and the Marquisate of Finale recovered. In his two years as doge Brignole Sale protected the state from nothing less than a European war, a military invasion, a maritime blockade and a popular revolt, deserving the praises that were then recognized.

At the end of the two-year period of his Dogate, Brignole was appointed "perpetual procurator" and "superintendent of the strongholds" and, when he did not participate in the government of the State, he took care of administering his lands in Groppoli, challenging the Grand Duchy of Tuscany that had officially divested it. Brignole Sale died on February 14, 1760, in Palazzo Rosso, Genoa.

== See also ==
- Republic of Genoa
- Doge of Genoa
- Palazzo Rosso (Genoa)
- Giovanni Francesco I Brignole Sale
- Treaty of Aix-la-Chapelle (1748)
