= Agostino Pallavicini =

Doge of the Republic of Genoa and king of Corsica

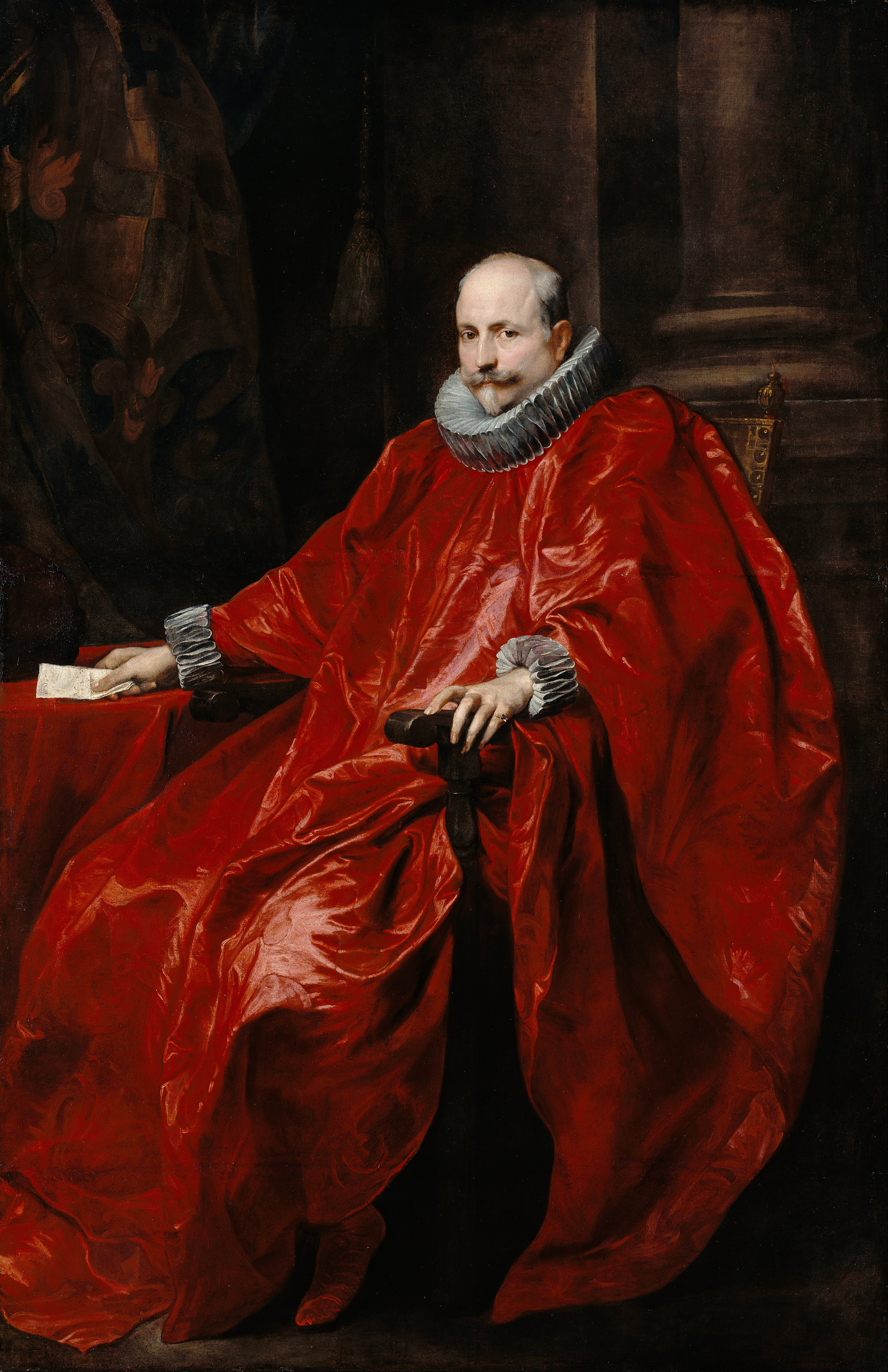
- Portrait by Anthony van Dyck

103rd Doge of the Republic of Genoa
- In office July 13, 1637 – July 13, 1639
- Preceded by: Giovanni Francesco I Brignole Sale
- Succeeded by: Giovanni Battista Durazzo

Personal details
- Born: 1577 Genoa, Republic of Genoa
- Died: 1649 (aged 71–72) Genoa, Republic of Genoa

Agostino Pallavicini (Genoa, 1577 – Genoa, 1649) was the 103rd Doge of the Republic of Genoa and king of Corsica.

== Biography ==
For the Republic of Genoa he held various institutional positions, including Doge of the Republic of Genoa, governor of Corsica, also called King, in the period between 1606 and 1608 and the position of protector of Bank of Saint George in 1625.

On 13 July 1637 he was invested by the Grand Council of the highest customs office: the fifty-eighth in two-year succession and the one hundred and third in republican history. As doge he was also invested with the biennial office of King of Corsica and was the first to bear that title. Under his command, construction began on the Lighthouse of Genoa pier.

Appointed perpetual procurator at the end of his mandate, on 13 July 1639, he died in Genoa during 1649. His body was buried inside the Basilica of San Siro.

== See also ==
- Doge of Genoa
- Republic of Genoa
- Pallavicini family
