= Luca Giustiniani =

Doge of the Republic of Genoa and king of Corsica

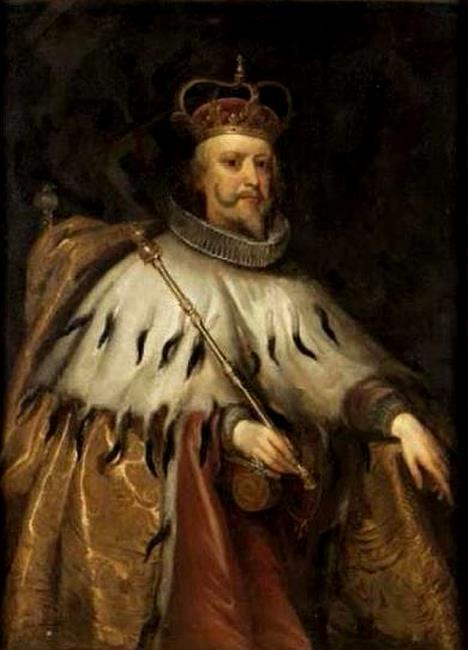
- Portrait by Jan Hovaert

107th Doge of the Republic of Genoa
- In office 21 July 1644 – 21 July 1646
- Preceded by: Giovanni Battista Lercari
- Succeeded by: Giovanni Battista Lomellini

Personal details
- Born: 1586 Genoa, Republic of Genoa
- Died: 24 October 1651 (aged 64–65) Genoa, Republic of Genoa

Luca Giustiniani (Genoa, 1586 - Genoa, 24 October 1651) was the 107th Doge of the Republic of Genoa and king of Corsica.

== Biography ==
Son of Alessandro Giustiniani Longo, doge in the two-year period 1611–1613, and Lelia De Franchi Toso, he was born in the Genoese capital around 1586. On 21 July 1644 Giustiniani was appointed by the Grand Council as the new doge of the Republic of Genoa, the 62nd in biennial succession and the one hundred and seventh in republican history. As doge he was also invested with the related biennial office of king of Corsica. Like his other predecessors, the doge of doge Luca Giustiniani was marked by the "economic, political and maritime rebirth" of the Republic of Genoa. After his two-year term, on 21 July 1646, he was elected from among the perpetual prosecutors after the favorable opinion of the supreme syndicators. Struck by fever, Luca Giustiniani died in Genoa on 24 October 1651.

== See also ==
- Republic of Genoa
- Doge of Genoa
