= Jan Hovaert =

Flemish painter

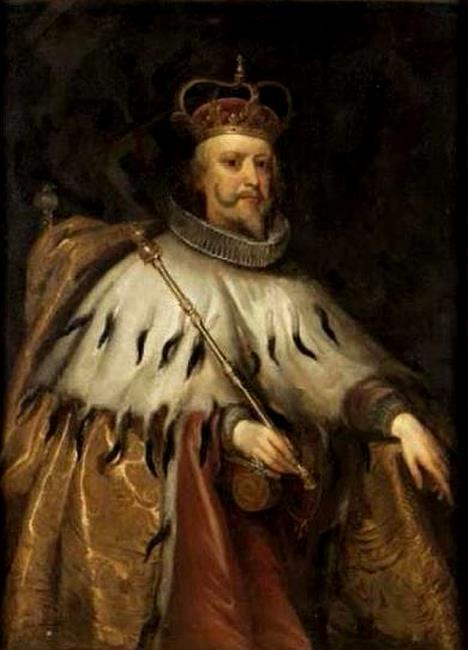
Portrait of Luca Giustiniani, the doge of Genoa

Jan Hovaert or Giovanni Hovart (c. 1615–1665) was a Flemish painter who after training in Antwerp spent his known active career in Italy. He was initially a collaborator in the studio of the de Wael brothers in Genoa and later developed an independent practice. While he appears to have enjoyed the patronage of the nobility of Genoa, the scope of his oeuvre is not very well understood. A few portraits and a history painting have been attributed to him.

== Life ==
Details about the life of the artist are scarce. The artist biographer Raffaello Soprani discusses Hovaert in his 1768 Vite de' pittori, scultori, ed architetti genovesi, in which he refers to the artist as 'Giovanni Hovart'. His birthplace was likely Brussels but may also have been Antwerp. He is believed to be the person registered under the name Hans de Houwer as a pupil of the otherwise obscure painter Jan Blanckaert in the records of the Antwerp Guild of Saint Luke in the guild year 1633–33.

He left Flanders soon after commencing his training in Antwerp. He is recorded in Genoa around 1635. Genoa was at the time an attractive destination for artists since the competition between artists there was less intense than in the leading Italian cultural centres Rome, Florence and Venice. Genoa was also a thriving port city where a large number of potential customers and collectors lived.

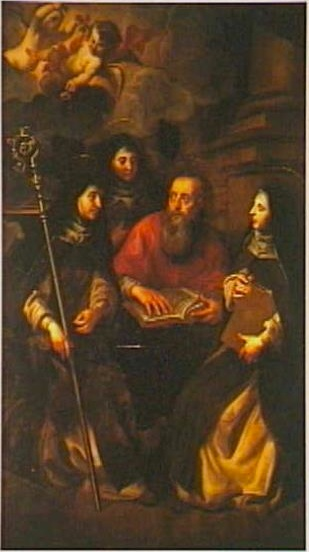
St. Jerome together with his disciples St. Paula and St. Eustochium

In Genoa Hovaert seems to have quickly been taken under the wing of Cornelis. Cornelis de Wael was a painter as well as a merchant who had moved to Genoa with his brother Lucas from their native Antwerp around 1619. The workshop of the brothers de Wael in Genoa was the centre of the colony of Flemish artists who resided in or passed through the city. These itinerant Flemish artists could take advantage of the work and artistic activity that their workshop attracted. The brothers provided a home, materials and tools, they assisted their compatriots with their local integration, passed on recommendations to clients and formulated competition rules. When Anthony van Dyck visited Genoa, he also stayed with the de Wael brothers. Several Flemish artists visiting Genoa became collaborators in the de Wael workshop. This was also the case of Jan Hovaert who is described as a pupil as well as a collaborator of Cornelis de Wael.

It seems that later on Hovaert was able to establish himself as an independent painter of historical and religious subjects as well as portraits. These works were highly appreciated by the Genoese nobility but only a few of these have been located. The contemporary fame of Hovaert is attested by his inclusion in his contemporary Luca Assarino's Giuochi di Fortuna, o sia gli avvenimenti di Astiage e di Mandane, of 1669. Assarino includes Hovaert, whom he refers to as 'Giovanni Havvorth', among the leading painters in Genoa of that time such as Salvatore Castiglione, Giovanni Benedetto Castiglione, Giovanni Andrea de Ferrari and Giovanni Battista Carlone.

Hovaert married Giovanna Anna Teodora Smit, daughter of Lambert Smit, the Consul of the Flemish-German nation in Livorno in 1631. They had a number of children. One of their sons became a painter and studied in Rome.

He died in Genoa in 1665.

== Work ==
De Wael was a painter of religious subjects as well as of portraits. His currently known oeuvre is limited to two works.

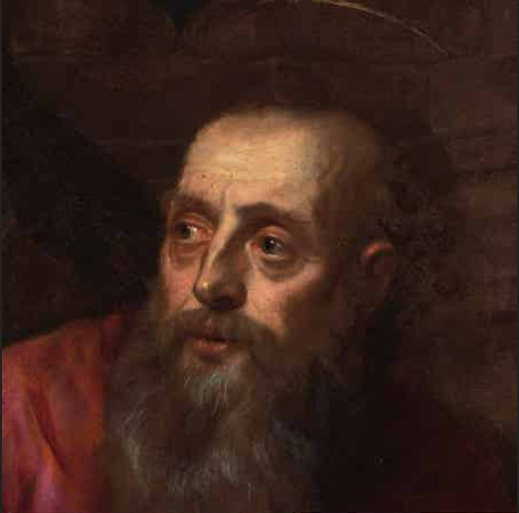
Head of St. Jerome (detail of the St. Jerome altarpiece)

Hovaert was active as a portrait painter. Among the 111 works recorded to be in his workshop upon his death were many portraits of prominent personalities in Genoa. Luca Assarino mentions that Hovaert's reputation relied on his portraits of female and male sitters and that he painted a portrait of Luca Giustiniani, the Doge of the Republic of Genoa between 1644 and 1646. Two portraits representing Luca Giustiniani, one, a preparatory study on board (private collection) and the other, a final work on canvas (Musée de Bastia) were formerly attributed to his master Cornelis de Wael but are now given to Hovaert.

A painting representing St. Jerome together with his disciples St. Paula and St. Eustochium (Church of Saint Magdalene, Genoa) is the sole surviving religious work of the artist. The altarpiece was most likely commissioned to celebrate the second dedicatee of the church of the Magdalene, Saint Jerome. Saint Jerome was dear to the Somaschi Fathers who owned the church since 5 October 1576 as their founder Gerolamo Emiliani was named after the saint. The Somaschi Fathers initiated a total renovation of the church interior in 1635. It is therefore plausible to take the year 1635 as the earliest date for the execution of Hovaert's altarpiece. The canvas has a pyramidal composition. Saint Jerome is sitting at the center of the group of three saints Paula, Blaesilla and Eustochium. He is shown reading out from a big book that is on his lap. He is reading the genesis of the Vulgate, an educational theme that was dear to the Somaschi Fathers. Hovaert has depicted Saint Jerome as the austere wise model portrayed by Antonello da Messina rather than the disheveled and gaunt figure devoured by penitence preferred by 16th and 17th century painters. The work shows the stylistic characteristics of the artist: the use of rapid touches and a free brush in the physiognomies and palette of the painting. The face of Gerolamo is marked by study and age, and weighed down by dark and voluminous circles. His eyes are vivid and very mobile and their liquidity and brightness is highlighted through carefully placed highlights and dots of color. The hands follow less the diaphanous and elongated form of the Vandyckian model. The fingers have an earthy and fleshy consistency. The style and palette are close to the works of Cornelis De Wael.

Hovaert may also have been active as the copyist who created many of the copies after van Dyck that are found in Genoa.
