= Giovanni Battista Lercari (1576–1657) =

Doge of the Republic of Genoa and king of Corsica

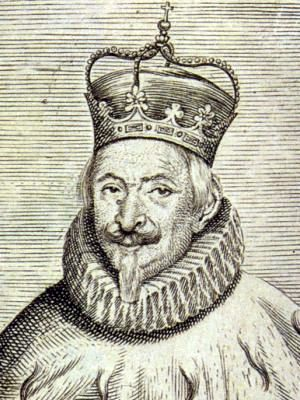

106th Doge of the Republic of Genoa
- In office 4 July 1642 – 4 July 1644
- Preceded by: Giovanni Agostino De Marini
- Succeeded by: Luca Giustiniani

Personal details
- Born: 1576 Genoa, Republic of Genoa
- Died: 1657 (aged 80–81) Genoa, Republic of Genoa

Gia Giovanni Battista Lercari (Genoa, 1576 - Genoa, 1657) was the 106th Doge of the Republic of Genoa and king of Corsica.

== Biography ==
On 4 July 1642 he was called by the Grand Council to lead the highest office in the state: the 61st in biennial succession and the one hundred and sixth in republican history. As doge he was also invested with the related biennial office of king of Corsica.

His dogal mandate was marked by the opening in Genoa of the new Via Giulia (today's Via XX Settembre) and the prohibition of the "seminary game", linked to the extraction of the senators of the Republic. After the biennium ended on 4 July 1644, no further details of Giovanni Battista Lercari's post-dogato life are known. He died in Genoa in 1657.

== See also ==
- Republic of Genoa
- Doge of Genoa

== Sources ==
- Buonadonna, Sergio. Rosso doge. I dogi della Repubblica di Genova dal 1339 al 1797.
