= Durazzo family =

Genoese noble family

Durazzo Durassa
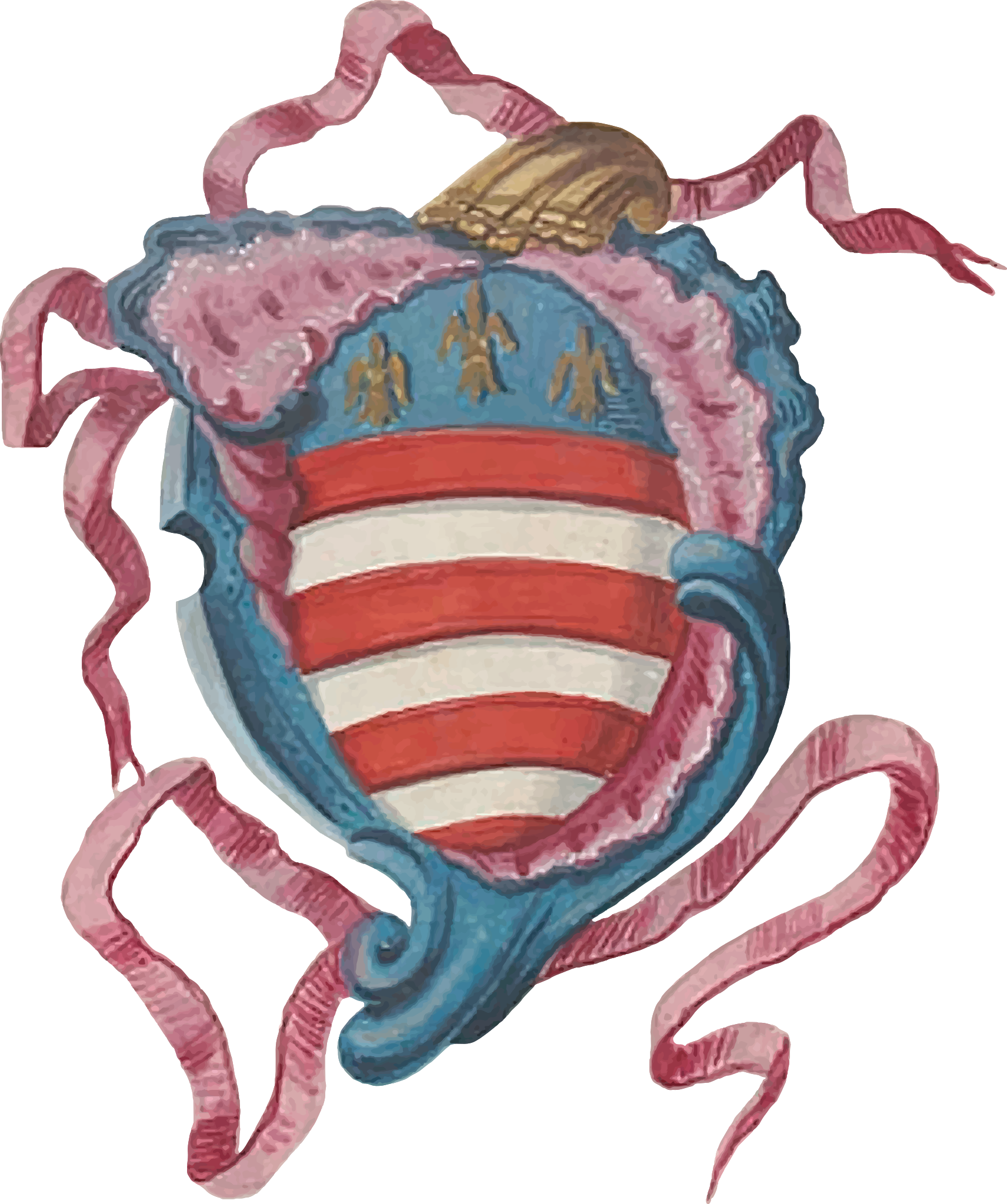
- Country: Republic of Genoa; Ligurian Republic
- Current region: Italy; European Union
- Origin: Durrës in Albania
- Founder: Giorgio Durazzo
- Current head: Stefano Durazzo
- Titles: Doge of Genoa (non-hereditary); Marquis of Gabiano

The Durazzo were a noble Italian family heralding from the city of Durrës in Albania. Despite being from Albania, the family was of French origin, descended from the Capetian House of Anjou-Sicily.

The Durazzo family assisted the Republic of Genoa on the development of many cities. Nine doges of Genoa were of this family.

Still existing, the representatives of this family live in Genoa, the Principality of Monaco and Rome.

== Members ==
- Clelia Durazzo Grimaldi (1760-1830), botanist
- Giacomo Durazzo (1717-1794), diplomat and man of theatre
- Giacomo Filippo Durazzo III (1729-1812), naturalist and bibliophile
- it:Girolamo Luigi Durazzo (1739-1809), politic
- Stefano Durazzo (1594-1667), cardinal and Archbishop of Genoa
- Giovanni Battista Durazzo (1565-1642), 104th Doge of the Republic of Genoa and King of Corsica

== Palaces ==
- Villa Di Negro Rosazza dello Scoglietto

== Sources ==
- Enciclopedia Italiana, article Durazzo.
