= Giacomo De Franchi Toso =

Doge of the Republic of Genoa and king of Corsica

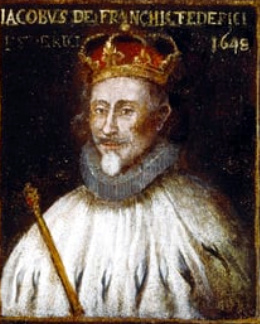

109th Doge of the Republic of Genoa
- In office August 1, 1648 – August 1, 1650
- Preceded by: Giovanni Battista Lomellini
- Succeeded by: Agostino Centurione

Personal details
- Born: 1590 Genoa, Republic of Genoa
- Died: 1657 (aged 66–67) Genoa, Republic of Genoa

Giacomo De Franchi Toso (1590 in Genoa – 1657 in Genoa) was the 109th Doge of the Republic of Genoa and king of Corsica.

== Biography ==
Son of Federico De Franchi Toso, doge in the two-year period 1623–1625, and Maddalena Durazzo, he was born in Genoa around 1590. His dogal mandate, the sixty-fourth in biennial succession and the one hundred and nineteenth in republican history, was among the public events characterized by the attempted conspiracy of the noble Stefano Raggio against various exponents of the Genoese nobility and, among these, also the doge Giacomo De Franchi Toso. In the religious field the Doge Giacomo De Franchi Toso tried to assert his institutional role, and therefore of the sovereignty of the republic, repeatedly denouncing with abuse the official abuse of civil jurisdiction committed by the Genoese clergy, and in particular of Cardinal Stefano Durazzo which the Holy See removed from Genoa for a certain period. When the Dogate ceased on 1 August 1650 and appointed perpetual procurator, he still worked for the Genoese state, establishing economic relations with Bank of Saint George. De Franchi Toso died in 1657.

== See also ==
- Republic of Genoa
- Doge of Genoa
