= Giovanni Francesco I Brignole Sale =

Doge of the Republic of Genoa and king of Corsica

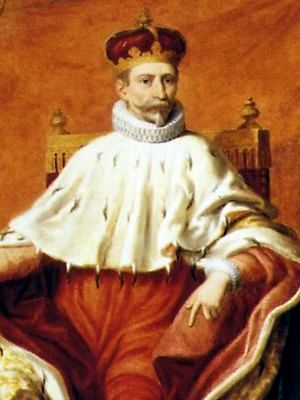

102nd Doge of the Republic of Genoa
- In office July 11, 1635 – July 11, 1637
- Preceded by: Giovanni Stefano Doria
- Succeeded by: Agostino Pallavicini

Personal details
- Born: 1582 Genoa, Republic of Genoa
- Died: 1637 (aged 54–55) Genoa, Republic of Genoa

Giovanni Francesco Brignole (Genoa, 1582 - Genoa, 1637) was the 102nd Doge of the Republic of Genoa and the first king of Corsica.

== Biography ==
During his dogal two-year period he preferred to start a situation of impartiality and economic neutrality and, consequently, also political both with the Kingdom of France and with the Spanish Empire. In his mandate, moreover, he started negotiations and purchases for some fiefs of the Genoese and the Ligurian region originally in the hands of the Spinola and Doria dynasties.

One of the main reasons why Gian Francesco Brignole Sale is remembered is that during his mandate he not only managed to guarantee Genoese independence in the face of the great European powers, but above all he managed to considerably transform the genoese institution, managing to make them recognize real royal attributions. With Corsica the pretext was found, the doge became king of Corsica.

The official investiture of the Virgin Mary dates back almost to the end of its management as "Queen and protector of Genoa", followed by a solemn religious and state ceremony for the coronation of the new statue depicting the Madonna which was positioned inside the Cathedral of San Lorenzo and adorned with the royal crown, the scepter and the keys of the city. It was Doge Brignole Sale himself who handed over to the Genoese archbishop Giovanni Domenico Spinola such "state" effigies for the Virgin amid the ringing of festive bells and cannon shots.

Another consequence of the changes in the statute was the transformation of the rank of the Genoese patricians. Given that every patrician could have been elected doge, therefore every patrician was a potential successor of a king, the Genoese patricians rose to the same rank as a prince of the blood or crown prince of the other European crowns.

The dogate ceased on 11 July, the former doge Giovanni Francesco Brignole Sale died in Genoa in 1637. His body was buried inside the church of Santa Maria di Castello.

== See also ==
- Doge of Genoa
- Republic of Genoa
