= William Batt (doctor) =

William Batt, M.D. (1744–1812), was an English physician, chemist, and botanist.

== Life ==
Batt, born at Collingbourne, Wiltshire, on 18 June 1744, was for some time a student at Oxford University. He then attended courses of medical instruction in the London schools, after which he went to Montpellier, where he took his doctor's degree in 1770. His name also appears, under date 5 October 1771, among the students who studied at Leyden.

On completing his studies he returned to England, but on account of his health he subsequently removed to Genoa, where he obtained an extensive medical practice, and in 1774 was appointed professor of chemistry in the university. Previous to this the study of chemistry in the university of Genoa had been much neglected, but soon after his appointment the lectures were thronged with pupils. He also made a special study of botany, and gathered an extensive collection of rare plants. His wide and varied acquirements and his public spirit won him the general esteem of his fellow-citizens, which was greatly increased by his self-sacrificing attentions to the sick during the severe epidemic of 1800. He resigned his professorship in 1787 on account of a prolonged visit to England.

He died at Genoa on 9 February 1812.

== Publications ==
He was the author of a considerable number of treatises on medical subjects, the principal of which are:

- 'Pharmacopea' 1787
- 'Storia della epidemia che fece strage in Genova all' epoca del blocco' 1800
- 'Reflessioni sulla febbre degli spedali' 1800
- 'Considerazioni sull' innesto della vaccina' 1801
- 'Alcuni dettagli sulla febbre gialla' 1804
- 'Memoria sulla Scarlattina perniciosa' 1807
- 'Storia di una epidemia che regnò in Genova nel 1808' 1809.

A large number of his papers are in the 'Transactions of the Medical Society of Genoa'.
