= Agostino Spinola =

Agostino Spinola may refer to:

- Agostino Spinola (Doge of Genoa) (1624–1692), king of Corsica
- Agostino Spinola (bishop of Perugia) (c. 1482–1537), Italian Roman Catholic cardinal
- Agustín de Spínola Basadone (1597–1649), Spanish cardinal and statesman
