= List of number-one Billboard Latin Pop Airplay songs of 2023 =

The Billboard Latin Pop Airplay is a subchart of the Latin Airplay chart that ranks the most-played Latin pop songs on Latin radio stations. Published by Billboard magazine, the data are compiled by Nielsen SoundScan based collectively on each single's weekly airplay.

== Chart history ==
Issue date	Song	Artist	Ref.
January 7	"Provenza"	Karol G	
January 14	"Provenza"	Karol G	
January 21	"Tacones Rojos"	Sebastián Yatra	
January 28	"Tacones Rojos"	Sebastián Yatra	
February 4	"Bzrp Music Sessions, Vol. 53"	Bizarrap and Shakira	
February 11	"Bzrp Music Sessions, Vol. 53"	Bizarrap and Shakira	
February 18	"Bzrp Music Sessions, Vol. 53"	Bizarrap and Shakira	
February 25	"Bzrp Music Sessions, Vol. 53"	Bizarrap and Shakira	
March 4	"Bzrp Music Sessions, Vol. 53"	Bizarrap and Shakira	
March 11	"Bzrp Music Sessions, Vol. 53"	Bizarrap and Shakira	
March 18	"Bzrp Music Sessions, Vol. 53"	Bizarrap and Shakira	
March 25	"Bzrp Music Sessions, Vol. 53"	Bizarrap and Shakira	
April 1	"Bzrp Music Sessions, Vol. 53"	Bizarrap and Shakira	
April 8	"Bzrp Music Sessions, Vol. 53"	Bizarrap and Shakira	
April 15	"Bzrp Music Sessions, Vol. 53"	Bizarrap and Shakira	
April 22	"Bzrp Music Sessions, Vol. 53"	Bizarrap and Shakira	
April 29	"TQG"	Karol G and Shakira	
May 6	"TQG"	Karol G and Shakira	
May 13	"TQG"	Karol G and Shakira	
May 20	"TQG"	Karol G and Shakira	
May 27	"Una Noche Sin Pensar"	Sebastián Yatra	
June 3	"Una Noche Sin Pensar"	Sebastián Yatra	
June 10	"Una Noche Sin Pensar"	Sebastián Yatra	
June 17	"Una Noche Sin Pensar"	Sebastián Yatra	
June 24	"TQG"	Karol G and Shakira	
July 1	"TQG"	Karol G and Shakira	
July 8	"TQG"	Karol G and Shakira	
July 15	"TQG"	Karol G and Shakira	
July 22	"TQG"	Karol G and Shakira	
July 29	"TQG"	Karol G and Shakira	
August 5	"TQG"	Karol G and Shakira	
August 12	"TQG"	Karol G and Shakira	
August 19	"TQG"	Karol G and Shakira	
August 26	"TQG"	Karol G and Shakira	
September 2	"Vagabundo"	Sebastián Yatra, Manuel Turizo and Beéle	
September 9	"Vagabundo"	Sebastián Yatra, Manuel Turizo and Beéle	
September 16	"Copa Vacía"	Shakira and Manuel Turizo	
September 23	"Copa Vacía"	Shakira and Manuel Turizo	
September 30	"Copa Vacía"	Shakira and Manuel Turizo	
October 7	"Copa Vacía"	Shakira and Manuel Turizo	
October 14	"Copa Vacía"	Shakira and Manuel Turizo	
October 21	"Copa Vacía"	Shakira and Manuel Turizo	
October 28	"Copa Vacía"	Shakira and Manuel Turizo	
November 4	"Copa Vacía"	Shakira and Manuel Turizo	
November 11	"Amor Clandestino"	Maná and Eden Munoz	
November 18	"Pasa_je_ro"	Farruko	
November 25	"Pasa_je_ro"	Farruko	
December 2	"Pasa_je_ro"	Farruko	
December 9	"Pasa_je_ro"	Farruko	
December 16	"Pasa_je_ro"	Farruko	
December 23	"Copa Vacía"	Shakira and Manuel Turizo	
December 30	"Las Mujeres"	Carlos Vives and Juanes	
