= Shakira: Bzrp Music Sessions, Vol. 53 =

2023 single by Bizarrap and Shakira

Single by Bizarrap and Shakira
- Language: Spanish
- Released: 11 January 2023
- Recorded: August 2022
- Studio: Barcelona
- Genre: Electropop; EDM
- Length: 3:33
- Label: Dale Play
- Songwriters: Gonzalo Conde; Shakira Mebarak; Kevyn Cruz; Santiago Alvarado
- Producer: Bizarrap

Bizarrap singles chronology
| "3 Estrellas en el Conjunto" (2022) | "Shakira: Bzrp Music Sessions, Vol. 53" (2023) | "Arcángel: Bzrp Music Sessions, Vol. 54" (2023) |

Shakira singles chronology
| "Monotonía" (2022) | "Shakira: Bzrp Music Sessions, Vol. 53" (2023) | "TQG" (2023) |

Music video
- "Shakira: Bzrp Music Sessions, Vol. 53" on YouTube

"Shakira: Bzrp Music Sessions, Vol. 53" (Note: Alternatively known as "Out of Your League" or "Pa' Tipos Como Tú" (”for guys like you") in Spanish.) is a song by Argentine producer Bizarrap and Colombian singer-songwriter Shakira. It was released on 11 January 2023, through Dale Play Records – part of his popular Bzrp Music Sessions video series. Shakira's twelfth studio album, Las Mujeres Ya No Lloran (2024), is named after a lyric from the song and includes both the original version and a remix by Tiësto.

A diss track taking aim at Shakira's ex-partner, footballer Gerard Piqué, as well as a women's empowerment anthem, the song reportedly "broke the internet", breaking various records for viewership and listenership for a Spanish-language and a Latin song, as well as having measurable market impact on certain brands mentioned in the lyrics. The song reached number one in 16 countries, as well as on the Billboard Hot Latin Songs chart. It was Bizarrap's first and Shakira's fifth top-ten single (and first all-Spanish track) on the US Billboard Hot 100, her first since "Beautiful Liar" with Beyoncé (2007). It has been praised musically for its catchy sound and cutthroat breakup lyrics as well as for Bizarrap's contribution in giving Shakira a new sound. The song won Song of the Year and Best Pop Song at the 24th Annual Latin Grammy Awards, while the remix won the inaugural award for Best Latin Electronic Music Performance the following year.

== Background ==
It was first rumoured that Shakira may be the next guest on Bzrp Music Sessions in August 2022, when she wished Bizarrap a happy birthday on social media. The collaboration was confirmed by Bizarrap on social media on 10 January 2023. Despite the rumours, Rolling Stone wrote that Bizarrap's fans were disbelieving that Shakira was working with him.

Shakira and Gerard Piqué met in 2010, and officially began their relationship in 2011, having two sons together. They separated in 2022. In 2021, Spanish authorities sought charges against Shakira, claiming that she should have paid income tax in Spain between 2012 and 2014 as she was in a relationship with Piqué and he lived in Barcelona, even though she maintains she did not. All of these things are implicitly alluded to in her song.

In 2022, prior to her Bzrp Music session, Shakira began releasing a series of singles with relationship or infidelity themes to their lyrics. Her April 2022 single, "Te Felicito" ("I congratulate you"), recorded with Puerto Rican singer Rauw Alejandro, although written in 2021 and released before the separation was announced, has been said to be about the breakup. In October 2022, she released "Monotonía" ("monotony"), discussing her and Piqué's split, a slower song focused on heartbreak and blaming monotony for the relationship ending. The song "TQG" ("te quedo grande”, or "too much for you"), recorded with fellow Colombian superstar Karol G, was released in February 2023 to massive success. Both women had experienced relationship turmoil (Karol G with Puerto Rican artist Anuel AA) in the months leading-up to the single's release, with the lyrics reflecting moving-on, making their own money and realizing that they were too good for their men. Later that year, she released another song, "Copa Vacía", with young Colombian singer Manuel Turizo, the title meaning "empty glass" or "empty cup".

== Release and promotion ==
On 9 January 2023, a small plane flew over Mar del Plata and Miami, carrying a banner with the words "una loba como yo no está pa' tipos como tú" and hinting at a release on 11 January. After the song was confirmed the next day, people responded by speculating what Shakira may sing; Billboard noted that Bizarrap's music sessions typically featured rappers "who don't hold back taking aim at something or someone". Some lyrics that were leaked on 10 January indicated that the song would be about Shakira's break-up with Piqué.

Independent label Dale Play Records sent "Shakira: Bzrp Music Sessions, Vol. 53" to US rhythmic contemporary radio and US contemporary hit radio on January 24, 2023.

== Composition and lyrics ==
Shakira worked with popular Latin music songwriter Keityn (Kevyn Cruz) on the track, having worked with him on her last two songs. Keityn said that after "Monotonía", Shakira wanted to write a more spiteful song, and the pair worked to create a song that neither went too far or was too soft for her.

When Shakira met with him to work on the lyrics in her home studio in Barcelona, "she came with a list of everything she wanted to say." Keityn stated in an interview: "Shakira was the songwriter. [...] I merely helped her to make rhymes."

The lyrics contain many references to Piqué and their relationship, with Shakira criticizing him for his media scandals that saw her targeted; for moving his mother in next to their home; and for their relationship causing the Spanish treasury to go after her taxes. NPR Music wrote that the line referring to her ex as a "novato" could be referring to the ten-year age gap between Shakira and Piqué. The line "una loba como yo no está pa' tipos como tú" references Shakira's 2009 song "Loba", while intentional pauses in the words "claramente" and "salpique" emphasise "clara" and "pique", referring to Piqué and his girlfriend, Clara Chía. In an interview on The Tonight Show Starring Jimmy Fallon on March 10, 2023, Shakira revealed that the beat and instrumentals for the track were inspired by English electronic band Depeche Mode and their "dark undertone."

== Critical reception ==
Critics' reviews of the song praised the lyrics and celebrated Shakira and Bizarrap for the overall composition, particularly in giving Shakira a new place in modern music. Several reviews highlighted the popular response to the song, which was largely supportive of Shakira and her decision to take revenge on Piqué through song.

A review in The Telegraph felt the song was massively effective as a pop song both in sound and in lyrically capturing an audience, saying "never has a pop song been so catchy and practical in near equal measure." Ximena N. Beltran Quan Kiu for CNN also praised the catchy lyrics, saying the song is "a formidable addition to the canon of breakup songs" and a public reminder of Shakira's quality. Also reflecting on the years Shakira spent without releasing major music since her 2017 album El Dorado, her career taking a backseat to supporting Piqué, NPR Music announced that "Shakira's himbo era is over." It called the song a "hard relaunch" for her career, with Bizarrap's production suggesting she is "on the hunt for a new, more relevant sound to reclaim her place in pop music." Feeling that the song does not have the same impact as her previous electronic hit, "She Wolf", NPR still felt it was successful, with Shakira's bravery to try a new sound paying off. BrooklynVegan agreed, emphasizing the potential for massive popularity with Shakira's "vocals [being] as iconic as ever" and Bizarrap "[giving] the song a modern and hard-hitting edge". Rolling Stone also asserted that the quality of the song would bring Shakira and her established superstardom back into public consciousness, with Suzy Exposito in the Los Angeles Times saying that the track would likely launch Bizarrap to fame in the United States due to this. The song generated accusations of plagiarism of a production by Venezuelan singer Briella, although other analyses have pointed out differences between the songs. Briella stated that she did not intend to discredit the artists, but only to defend her work. Billboard listed the track as the 10th best revenge song of all time and the best Spanish-language revenge song, calling it "one of the most blistering diss tracks of all time."

=== Mid-year lists ===
Select mid-year rankings of Shakira: Bzrp Music Sessions, Vol. 53
| Publication | List | Rank | Ref. |
|---|---|---|---|
| Rolling Stone | The Best Songs of 2023 So Far | 9 | |
| Los Angeles Times | The 40 Best Songs of 2023 So Far | —N/a | |
| Billboard | The 50 Best Songs of 2023 So Far: Staff Picks | 2 | |

=== Year-end lists ===
Select year end rankings of Shakira: Bzrp Music Sessions, Vol. 53
| Publication | List | Rank | Ref. |
|---|---|---|---|
| Latina | The Top 20 Songs of 2023 by Latina Artists | 1 | |
| Los Angeles Times | The 100 Best Songs of 2023 | 6 | |
| The New York Times | The 30 Best Songs of 2023 (Jon Pareles) | 8 | |
| Remezcla | Best Pop Songs of 2023 | 5 | |
| Rolling Stone | The 100 Best Songs of 2023 | 5 | |
| Slant Magazine | The 50 Best Songs of 2023 | 30 | |
| Stereogum | The Top 40 Pop Songs Of 2023 | 2 | |
| Time | The Best Latin Songs and Albums of 2023 | 1 | |
| USA Today | Top 10 best songs of 2023 | 8 | |
| Variety | The 65 Best Songs of 2023 | 20 | |
| Vulture | The 10 Best Songs of 2023 | 6 | |

== Accolades ==
Award nominations for "Bzrp Music Sessions, Vol. 53"
| Year | Ceremony | Award | Result | Ref. |
|---|---|---|---|---|
| 2023 | Heat Latin Music Awards | Song of the Year | Nominated | |
| 2023 | MTV Millennial Awards | Music Ship of the Year | Nominated | |
| 2023 | MTV Millennial Awards | Viral Anthem | Nominated | |
| 2023 | Premios Tu Música Urbano | Top Song - Pop Urban | Nominated | |
| 2023 | Premios Juventud | Best Pop/Urban Song | Won | |
| 2023 | Premios Juventud | Best Song For My Ex | Won | |
| 2023 | Billboard Latin Music Awards | Sales Song of the Year | Nominated | |
| 2023 | Billboard Latin Music Awards | Airplay Song of the Year | Nominated | |
| 2023 | Billboard Latin Music Awards | Latin Pop Song of the Year | Won | |
| 2023 | Latin Grammy Awards | Record of the Year | Nominated | |
| 2023 | Latin Grammy Awards | Song of the Year | Won | |
| 2023 | Latin Grammy Awards | Best Pop Song | Won | |
| 2023 | Los 40 Music Awards | Best Video | Nominated | |
| 2023 | Los 40 Music Awards | Best Urban Collaboration | Nominated | |
| 2023 | Latino Music Awards | Song of the Year | Nominated | |
| 2023 | Latino Music Awards | Viral Song | Nominated | |
| 2023 | Latino Music Awards | Best Urban Pop Song | Won | |
| 2023 | Billboard Music Awards | Top Dance/Electronic Song | Nominated | |
| 2023 | Premios Musa | International Latin Song of the Year | Nominated | |
| 2024 | Premios Gardel | Record of the Year | Nominated | |
| 2024 | Premios Gardel | Song of the Year | Nominated | |
| 2024 | Premios Gardel | Collaboration of the Year | Won | |
| 2024 | Premios Gardel | Best Urban Pop Song | Won | |

== Commercial performance ==
=== Streaming figures ===
The song reached the number one spot on iTunes in multiple countries within 24 hours of being available, including: Spain, Mexico, Italy and the US. The song debuted at number one on Spotify's Daily Global 200 chart, breaking the record for the highest debut for a Spanish-language song. It was also the fifth-highest Spotify debut of all time, with 14.39 million streams in its first day. It was also achieved new records as the most-streamed song on its second day of release, and most-streamed song on its third day of release, with 13.69 million and 12.86 million streams on the platform for those days respectively. The song has also broken the record of the most streamed song of a single day in Spain (3.94 million), Mexico (3.83 million), Argentina (1.46 million), Colombia, Costa Rica, Panama, Peru, Ecuador, Chile, Bolivia, Paraguay, Venezuela and Uruguay.

=== Chart performance ===
In under two days of tracking the song debuted on the Billboard Latin Digital Song Sales chart, debuting at number one. It was Bizarrap's first and Shakira's thirteenth number one, breaking her tie with Bad Bunny as the sole artist with the most number ones on the chart's history. Already having the most top ten Latin Pop Airplay hits among female artists, the song impacting this chart extending Shakira's record in this respect to 39. The song was a huge success in Latin America, debuting at number one in Colombia, Panama and Peru. It also reached the top ten in eleven other countries, including Argentina, Bolivia, Costa Rica, Chile, Ecuador, Lebanon and Mexico. (Note: See #Charts)

The song has earned her four Guinness World Records streaming wise -

- Most viewed Latin track on YouTube in 24 hours
- Fastest Latin track to reach 100 million views on YouTube
- Most streamed Latin track on Spotify in 24 hours
- Most streamed Latin track on Spotify in one week

In Spain, the song topped the Promusicae weekly charts after only one day of tracking and was certified platinum after eight tracking days. It further stayed 6 other weeks at number 1 on the chart. The song also reached number one in Italy, number two in Portugal and Switzerland, top ten in Greece and the US (further details below), top twenty in France, Ireland and Lithuania; top thirty in Belgium, Sweden, Germany and Canada, top forty in the United Kingdom and Denmark; and the top fifty in the Netherlands. (Note: See #Charts) In the US, the song became Shakira's first top 10 on the Billboard Hot 100 since 2007's "Beautiful Liar", reaching number 9 on the chart. The song became the first Spanish-language single by a female vocalist that peaked at top 10 on the chart which earned her a Guinness World Record.

=== Reactions ===
==== Pop culture ====
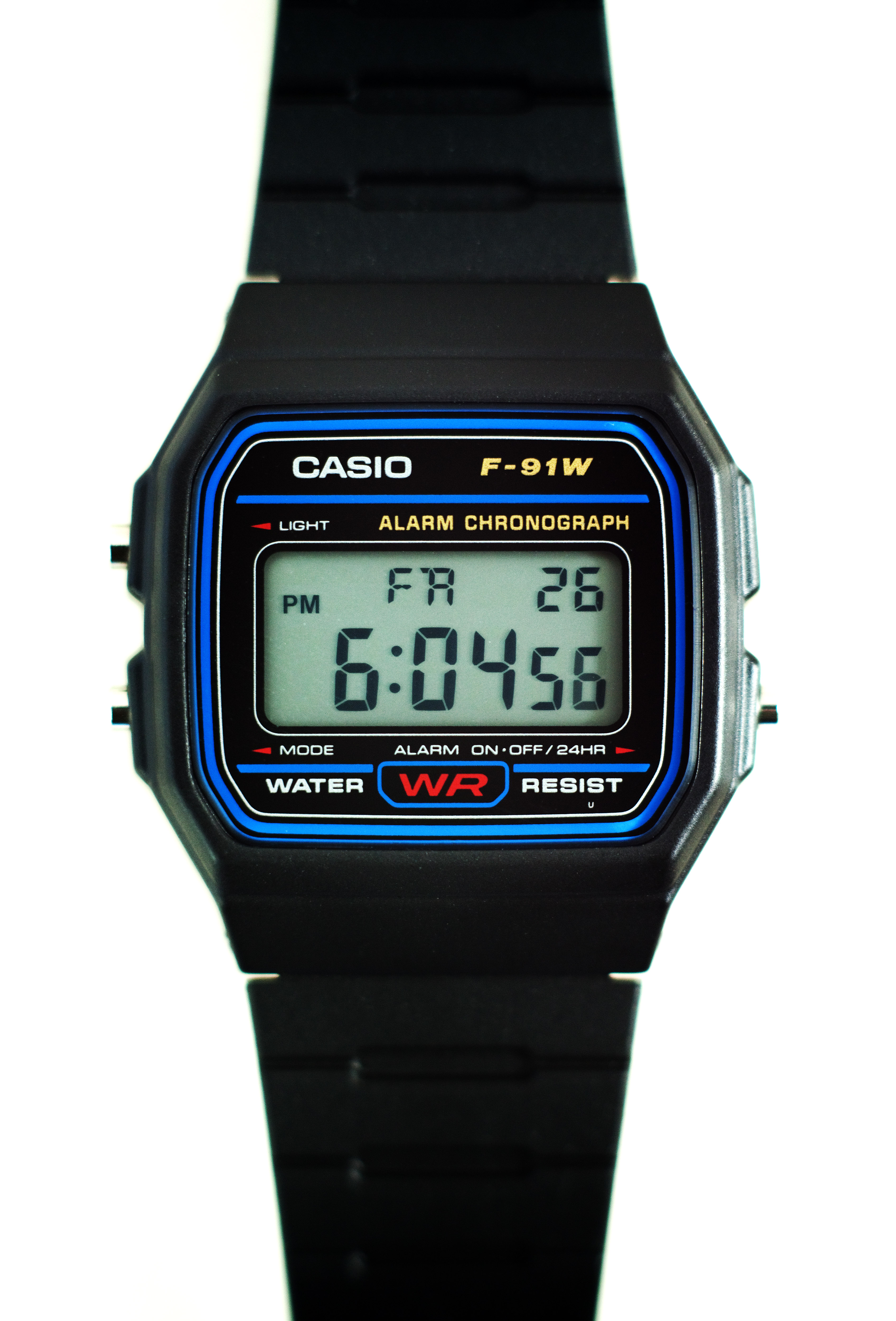
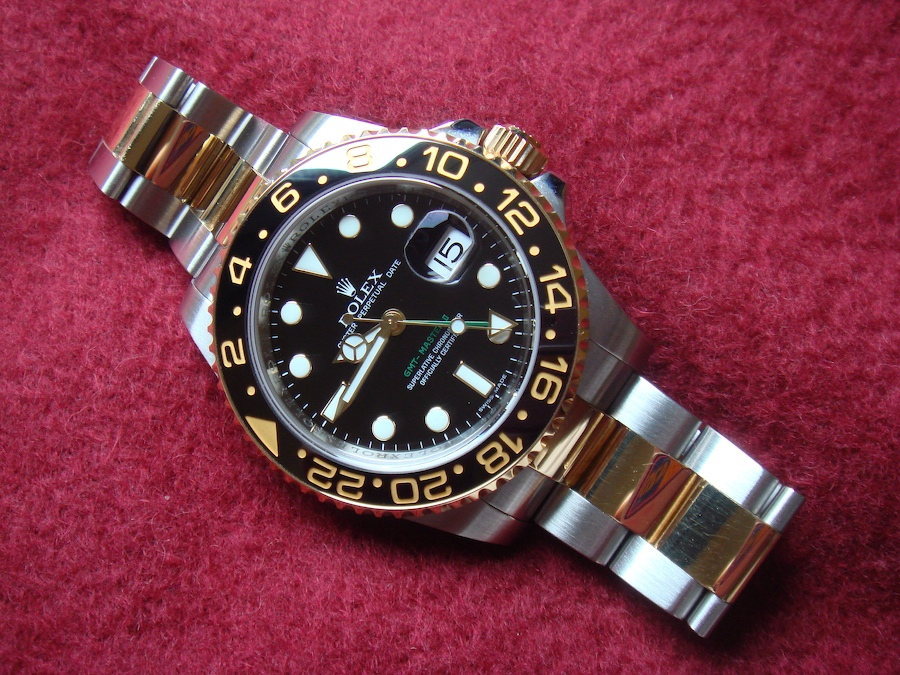
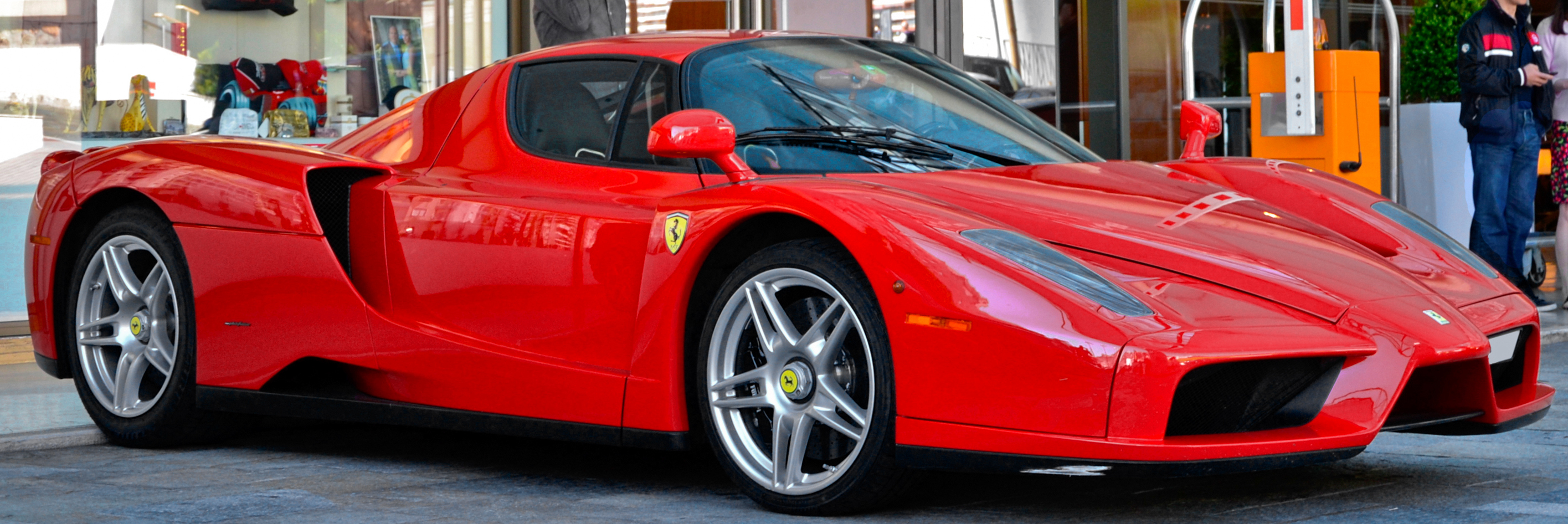
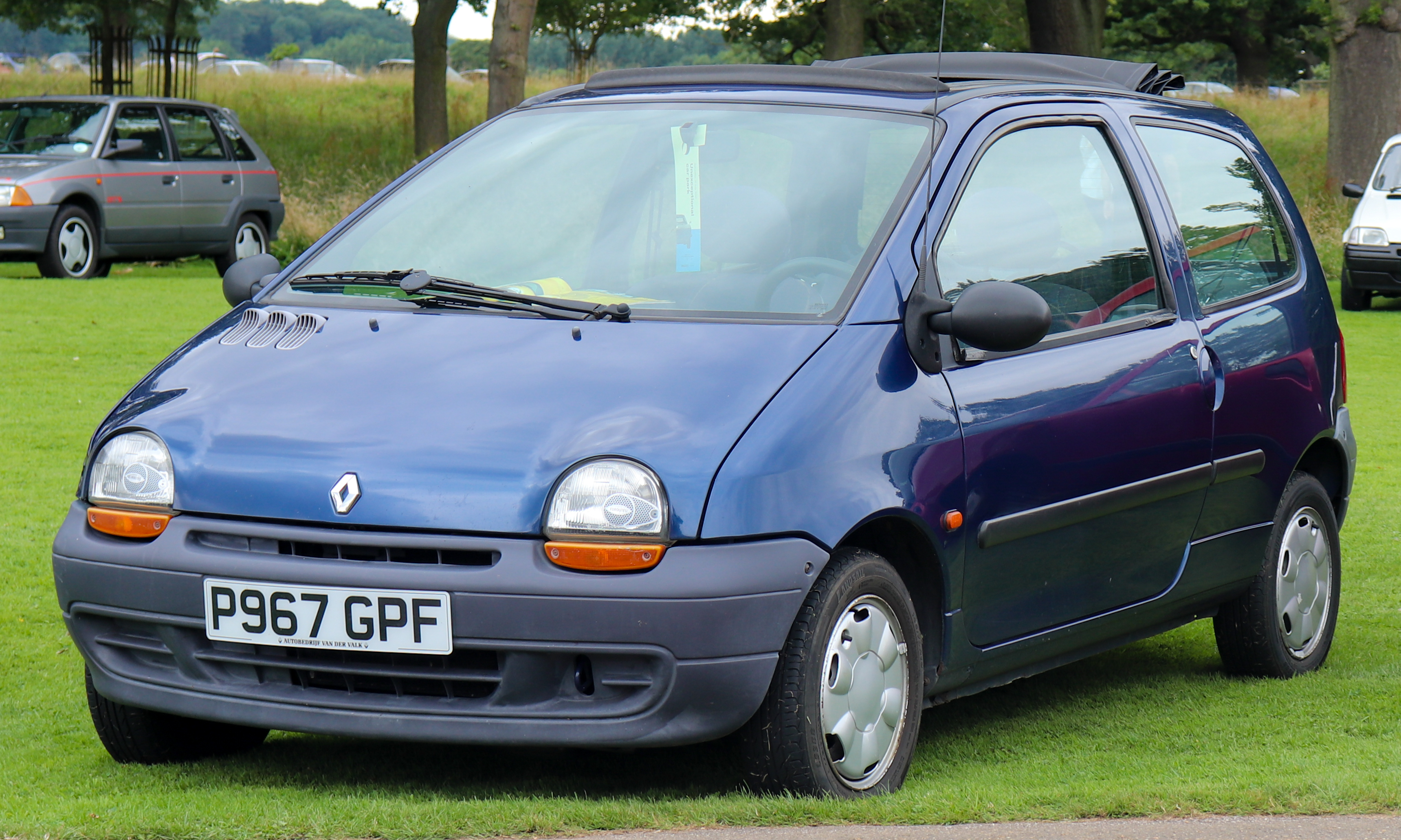
Clockwise from top-left: a Casio F-91W, popular for its low price; a Rolex GMT Master II made with gold and steel; an original Renault Twingo, a budget car option; a Ferrari Enzo luxury sports car

The song received positive reactions from many Latin music artists on social media, and within a day of its release Shakira's name was trending on Twitter at number one worldwide, with around 2.5 million tweets. Communications specialist Ximena N. Beltran Quan Kiu found that the song served as a "significant cultural statement", that Shakira refusing to feel shame for the end of her relationship was rejecting "societal expectations and pressures to behave in a certain way" as a woman. She suggested that this was the reason for its popularity, with people discussing Shakira's method of statement on social media also driving engagement. Other media wrote that one popular line in the song, gaining lots of engagement, was the hook "las mujeres ya no lloran, las mujeres facturan", embodying the empowering message; BIMM Institute lecturer Martin Wright also highlighted the line "yo contigo ya no regreso, ni que me llores, ni me supliques", which he said managed to "impressively" in one line convey multiple break-up song elements, including those used in songs both about being the one to end the relationship and the one getting left.

Shakira's name trended at number globally with over 2.1 million tweets for two days, other related phrases also trended on Twitter, including "RIP Piqué", "Clara Chía", "Claramente", "Salpique" "Casio" and "Rolex"; when the companies Casio and Renault, each having products mentioned in the song, started trending worldwide, both appeared to react to the song in their own posts. However the official Twitter account of Casio refuted these claims and reminded people to look out for fake accounts. The official Twitter account of the European Union Intellectual Property Office also responded on Twitter, with a joke about the line "cambiaste un Rolex por un Casio".

University of Cambridge lecturer Dr Maya Feile Tomes wrote a letter published in The Guardian, criticizing how the song espoused a feminist message but was "disappointingly sexist" by the way it demeans and judges the new girlfriend in the lyrics, something Feile Tomes felt was unnecessary. A CNN op-ed by author and communications specialist Ximena N. Beltran Quan Kiu instead felt that Shakira's lyrics were welcomely raw about all the things that were hurting her or keeping her up at night, including the cheating in which the new girlfriend was complicit, and her insecurity compared to younger women; Beltran Quan Kiu did note that among the popular responses were social media users "questioning whether Shakira broke an unwritten rule between women by dragging her ex's new flame".

==== Other artists ====
A handful of Latin artists reacted to the song with positive and encouraging messages to Shakira. The artists include Alejandro Sanz, Danna Paola, Andres Cepeda, Aitana, Tokischa, Fonseca, Carla Morrison, Manolo Cardona.

==== Shakira and Piqué ====
In the days after the song's release, Gerard Piqué acknowledged it in various affronted ways. He turned up for a recording for his Kings League (a seven-a-side football league created by Piqué and participated in by former footballers and streamers) show in a Twingo, and pointed out on the show that he was wearing a Casio watch, also claiming to have sponsorship from the company. Casio later denied having any ties to or plans to sponsor Piqué or the Kings League. It was reported in Spanish tabloids that Clara Chía, who is also targeted in the song, was stressed and scared to leave her house because of its popularity. It was reported that Chía hired professional help after the track, because people would stop her and sing it to her on the streets. According to journalists close to Gerard Piqué, Chía was admitted to a hospital in Barcelona after suffering from anxiety attacks. Piqué was booed at Esland Awards in Mexico with the crowd repeatedly chanting Shakira's name.

In thanking fans for their support on Instagram in the days after the release of the song, Shakira wrote that the song "was a catharsis" for herself, and she was happy it had become an anthem for other women going through break-ups or being made to feel insignificant, also thanking fans for having her go straight to number one "at 45 years old and in Spanish". On 14 January, Shakira put up a model of a witch on her balcony, facing Piqué mother's home, and played the song at full volume on repeat. The next day, after Shakira had turned off the song, fans gathered in the street outside Shakira's home and started singing and dancing to the track.

== Music video ==
Bizarrap's 53rd music session, serving as the official music video, was released on 11 January 2023. In it, Shakira performs the song in a teal-tinted studio with Bizarrap producing the song in the background. Straying from realism in part, the music video features animation that depicts Shakira and her microphone as rough pencil drawings, paying homage to the music video of "Take On Me". The animation was created by Julia Conde, who said "Take On Me" is her favourite music video.

The video was viewed over 50.3 million times within its first 24 hours of release, breaking the record for biggest debut for a Latin song in YouTube history "by some distance". During one 24-hour period in its first week, the video was watched over 82 million times, which broke the viewing record for a new Latin song. On 13 January 2023, in its third day of being available, it became the fastest Latin music video to reach 100 million views on the platform.

== Live performances ==
Bizarrap and Shakira performed the song live for the first time on 10 March 2023, on The Tonight Show Starring Jimmy Fallon. The performance likewise was a viral hit on the internet. Viewers praising Shakira's boldness and the audience interaction with the song. Four days after the performance, TheWrap revealed it had scored more than 156 million views across social media platforms including TikTok, Instagram, Facebook, YouTube and Twitter making it one of the most-viewed performances on The Tonight Show.

On 12 September 2023, Shakira was honored with MTV Video Vanguard Award at the 2023 MTV Video Music Awards where she performed a 10-minute medley of her greatest hits, closing of the set with Session 53. On 16 November 2023, Bizarrap and Shakira performed the song at the 24th Annual Latin Grammy Awards. On 2 February 2025, Shakira performed the song at the 67th Annual Grammy Awards, where Las Mujeres Ya No Lloran won Best Latin Pop Album. The song is the final performance of her Las Mujeres Ya No Lloran World Tour.

== Cultural impact ==
=== Carnivals ===
Upon the song's release, the song became the year's biggest carnival and parade costume and music theme in Spain and Latin America. Along with Shakira, caricatures Gerard and Clara were also common costume choices According to ¡Hola! Shakira was the most popular and iconic costume at carnivals in 2023, reporting that several videos were posted displaying the public's love for Shakira. These videos showcased individuals wearing various imaginative costumes such as dancers imitating Shakira's attire from the music video with caricatures of Gerard Pique and his Barcelona jersey and multiple floats of Casio watches and Twingos. Army of women wearing Shakira's attire from the video flocked the streets during a carnival in Argentina.

During a carnival in Macas, Ecuador a Twingo painted with Shakira phrases like "cuidado te salpique" was sunk in a pool. Aside from Shakira, Gerard, Clara, and Twingo and Casio watch floats, witch dolls were also present at a carnival in Girona, Spain representing Gerard Pique's mother, in reference to Shakira's witch doll which was set up on her balcony in Barcelona. Other related reference at the carnival were people disguised as the treasury workers referencing the line "la deuda en Hacienda".

At the Carnival of Santa Cruz de Tenerife, Shakira was depicted in the form of the Virgin Mary and was paraded around Tenerife with candles and roses while the Bizarrap session was played.

=== Marketplace ===
It quickly had an impact outside of music. According to Google Trends, searches for Twingo and Casio reached five-year highs worldwide, with Launchmetrics data showing that during the first week of the song's release, Casio and Rolex gained $70 million and $40.5 million respectively in media exposure across print, online content, and social media. Spanish media dubbed the fiscal impact "El efecto Shakira"; also affecting Ferrari, this company saw its share value rise 2.08% due to the positive mention in the song, while Casio had a 1.87% decrease in value and Renault a 1.45% decrease, with both being mentioned negatively. It soon became noted that the Shakira effect, as a phenomenon of social influence, may have seen the stock values of the brands mentioned negatively decrease, but also saw the social value of the brands increase; social media insights firm Audiense showed that besides social media mentions dramatically increasing for Casio, many of these were positive, including some social media users discussing a nostalgic affection for the brand, provoked by the song. On 23 January, the marketing director of Casio said "thanks to "the Shakira effect," the sales have been spectacular... [and] intense. But the best thing is every day [sales] are much better than last year."

=== References in politics ===
Croatian The Bridge MP Nino Raspudić used the lyrics as referents to convey a political message on 17 January at the session of the Croatian Parliament that saw Šime Erlić elected to succeed Nataša Tramišak as Minister of Regional Development and EU Funds, with Raspudić saying: "we could say that the two most dangerous women in the world right now are Tramišak and Shakira, and by electing Erlić you gave us a Twingo instead of a Ferrari." Senator and former Italian Prime Minister Matteo Renzi made a reference to the song's lyrics to convey a political message during an electoral event on 5 February leading up to the upcoming regional elections: "As they say in contemporary philosophy, they had a Ferrari and they traded it for a Twingo".

=== Academic studies ===
El Tiempo reported that, after a week of release, it was part of a study at the National Autonomous University of Mexico as a subject of analysis by gender studies experts. Educators are studying symbolism in its lyrics from the point of view of gender violence.

=== References in pop culture ===
- In February 2023, Puerto Rican rapper Daddy Yankee referenced the line "cambiaste un Rolex por un casio" in his collaboration with Justin Quiles and Dalex titled "La Hora y el Día" from his album Legendaddy, readapting the phrase and directly naming Shakira with the line "Cambié un Rolex por un Casio. Shakira me lo dijo y no le hice caso."
- In October 2023, Puerto Rican rapper Bad Bunny referenced the famous "Las mujeres ya no lloran, las mujeres facturan" line from session 53 in a track titled "Los Pits" from his album Nadie Sabe Lo Que Va a Pasar Mañana, altering the line to "ahora los hombres lloran, sí; pero sin parar de facturar."

== Legacy and records ==
"Shakira: Bzrp Music Sessions, Vol. 53" broke 14 Guinness World Records, on March 10, Bizarrap and Shakira were presented with four records in New York City. Shakira was further awarded ten additional awards for records she broke with the success of the session. The records broken by the song are:

- Most streamed Latin track on Spotify in 24 hours (14,393,324 streams)
- Most viewed Latin track on YouTube in 24 hours (63,000,000 views)
- Fastest Latin track to reach 100 million views on YouTube (two days and approximately 22 hours)
- Most streamed Latin track on Spotify in one week (80,646,962 streams)

Further records Shakira achieved with the song:

- First female vocalist to debut in the top ten of the Billboard Hot 100 with a Spanish-language track
- Most number one on the Billboard Latin Airplay chart by a female artist
- First female artist to replace herself at number one on the Billboard Latin Airplay chart
- Most cumulative weeks at number one on the Billboard Hot Latin Songs chart by a female artist
- Most top ten hits on the Billboard Hot Latin Songs chart by a female artist
- Most top ten hits on the Billboard Latin Airplay chart by a female artist
- Most number ones on the Billboard Latin Pop Airplay chart by a female artist
- Most top ten hits on the Billboard Latin Pop Airplay chart by a female artist
- Most number ones on the Billboard Latin Digital Song Sales chart
- Most Billboard charts topped by a Spanish-language track by a female artist

== Charts ==
=== Weekly charts ===
2023 weekly chart performance for "Shakira: Bzrp Music Sessions, Vol. 53"
| Chart (2023) | Peak position |
|---|---|
| Argentina Hot 100 (Billboard) | 1 |
| Argentina (Monitor Latino) | 1 |
| Australia (ARIA) | 100 |
| Austria (Ö3 Austria Top 40) | 16 |
| Belgium (Ultratop 50 Wallonia) | 21 |
| Bolivia (Billboard) | 1 |
| Bolivia (Monitor Latino) | 1 |
| Brazil Latin Airplay (Crowley Charts) | 1 |
| Canada Hot 100 (Billboard) | 25 |
| Canada CHR/Top 40 (Billboard) | 43 |
| Central America (Monitor Latino) | 1 |
| Chile (Billboard) | 1 |
| Chile (Monitor Latino) | 1 |
| CIS Airplay (TopHit) | 151 |
| Colombia (Billboard) | 1 |
| Colombia (Monitor Latino) | 1 |
| Costa Rica (FONOTICA) | 1 |
| Costa Rica (Monitor Latino) | 1 |
| Croatia (Billboard) | 7 |
| Czech Republic Singles Digital (ČNS IFPI) | 15 |
| Denmark (Tracklisten) | 40 |
| Dominican Republic (Monitor Latino) | 1 |
| Ecuador (Billboard) | 1 |
| Ecuador (Monitor Latino) | 1 |
| El Salvador (Monitor Latino) | 1 |
| Finland Airplay (Radiosoittolista) | 31 |
| France (SNEP) | 20 |
| Germany (GfK) | 26 |
| Global 200 (Billboard) | 2 |
| Greece International (IFPI) | 4 |
| Guatemala (Monitor Latino) | 1 |
| Honduras (Monitor Latino) | 1 |
| Hungary (Single Top 40) | 4 |
| Hungary (Stream Top 40) | 9 |
| Iceland (Tónlistinn) | 19 |
| Ireland (IRMA) | 14 |
| Italy (FIMI) | 1 |
| Latin America (Monitor Latino) | 1 |
| Lebanon Airplay (Lebanese Top 20) | 3 |
| Latvia (LaIPA) | 14 |
| Lithuania (AGATA) | 13 |
| Luxembourg (Billboard) | 2 |
| Middle East and North Africa (IFPI) | 16 |
| Mexico (Billboard) | 1 |
| Mexico (Monitor Latino) | 2 |
| Netherlands (Single Top 100) | 41 |
| Nicaragua (Monitor Latino) | 1 |
| Norway (IFPI Norge) | 37 |
| Panama (Monitor Latino) | 1 |
| Paraguay (Monitor Latino) | 1 |
| Peru (Billboard) | 1 |
| Peru (Monitor Latino) | 1 |
| Poland (Polish Airplay Top 100) | 32 |
| Poland (Polish Streaming Top 100) | 5 |
| Portugal (AFP) | 2 |
| Puerto Rico (Monitor Latino) | 2 |
| Romania (Billboard) | 7 |
| San Marino Airplay (SMRTV Top 50) | 11 |
| Slovakia Airplay (ČNS IFPI) | 17 |
| Slovakia Singles Digital (ČNS IFPI) | 7 |
| Spain (PROMUSICAE) | 1 |
| Sweden (Sverigetopplistan) | 24 |
| Switzerland (Schweizer Hitparade) | 2 |
| UK Singles (Official Charts) | 31 |
| UK Indie (Official Charts) | 5 |
| Uruguay (Monitor Latino) | 1 |
| US Billboard Hot 100 | 9 |
| US Hot Dance/Electronic Songs (Billboard) | 2 |
| US Hot Latin Songs (Billboard) | 1 |
| US Latin Airplay (Billboard) | 1 |
| US Pop Airplay (Billboard) | 37 |
| US Rhythmic Airplay (Billboard) | 20 |
| Venezuela Airplay (Monitor Latino) | 2 |

=== Monthly charts ===
Monthly chart performance for "Shakira: Bzrp Music Sessions, Vol. 53"
| Chart (2023) | Peak position |
|---|---|
| Paraguay Airplay (SPG) | 1 |
| Uruguay Streaming (CUD) | 1 |

=== Year-end charts ===
2023 year-end chart performance for "Shakira: Bzrp Music Sessions, Vol. 53"
| Chart (2023) | Position |
|---|---|
| Argentina (Monitor Latino) | 2 |
| Bolivia (Monitor Latino) | 1 |
| Chile (Monitor Latino) | 1 |
| Colombia (Monitor Latino) | 13 |
| Costa Rica (Monitor Latino) | 9 |
| Dominican Republic (Monitor Latino) | 3 |
| Ecuador (Monitor Latino) | 1 |
| El Salvador (ASAP EGC) | 1 |
| El Salvador (Monitor Latino) | 3 |
| France (SNEP) | 115 |
| Global 200 (Billboard) | 22 |
| Guatemala (Monitor Latino) | 1 |
| Honduras (Monitor Latino) | 5 |
| Italy (FIMI) | 27 |
| Lithuania Airplay (TopHit) | 194 |
| Mexico (Monitor Latino) | 13 |
| Nicaragua (Monitor Latino) | 3 |
| Spain (PROMUSICAE) | 1 |
| Switzerland (Schweizer Hitparade) | 54 |
| Panama (Monitor Latino) | 2 |
| Paraguay (Monitor Latino) | 2 |
| Peru (Monitor Latino) | 7 |
| Puerto Rico (Monitor Latino) | 21 |
| Romania (TopHit) | 154 |
| Uruguay (CUD) | 14 |
| US Billboard Hot 100 | 96 |
| US Hot Dance/Electronic Songs (Billboard) | 3 |
| US Hot Latin Songs (Billboard) | 12 |
| US Latin Airplay (Billboard) | 2 |
| US Latin Pop Airplay (Billboard) | 1 |
| Venezuela (Monitor Latino) | 15 |

2024 year-end chart performance for "Shakira: Bzrp Music Sessions, Vol. 53"
| Chart (2024) | Position |
|---|---|
| Hungary (Dance Top 100) | 86 |

2025 year-end chart performance for "Shakira: Bzrp Music Sessions, Vol. 53"
| Chart (2025) | Position |
|---|---|
| Bolivia Airplay (Monitor Latino) | 63 |
| Chile Airplay (Monitor Latino) | 32 |
| Hungary (Dance Top 40) | 99 |

== Certifications ==
Certifications for "Shakira: Bzrp Music Sessions, Vol. 53"
| Region | Certification | Certified units/sales |
|---|---|---|
| Colombia | 2× Diamond+5× Platinum+10× Gold | |
| France (SNEP) | Platinum | 200,000^{‡} |
| Italy (FIMI) | 3× Platinum | 300,000^{‡} |
| Mexico (AMPROFON) | Diamond+Platinum+Gold | 910,000^{‡} |
| Poland (ZPAV) | Gold | 62,500^{‡} |
| Portugal (AFP) | 2× Platinum | 20,000^{‡} |
| Spain (Promusicae) | 7× Platinum | 420,000^{‡} |
| United States (RIAA) | Gold | 500,000^{‡} |
Streaming
| Chile (PROFOVI) | Gold | 38,600,000 |
| Greece (IFPI Greece) | Gold | 1,000,000^{†} |
^{‡} Sales+streaming figures based on certification alone.^{†} Streaming-only figures based on certification alone.

== Release history ==
"Shakira: Bzrp Music Sessions, Vol. 53" release history
| Region | Date | Format(s) | Label | Ref. |
|---|---|---|---|---|
| Various | 11 January 2023 | Digital download; streaming | Dale Play | |
| United States | 24 January 2023 | Contemporary hit radio | Dale Play | |
| United States | 24 January 2023 | Rhythmic contemporary | Dale Play | |
| Italy | 27 January 2023 | Radio airplay | MayaSound | |

== See also ==
- List of best-selling singles in Spain
- List of best-selling singles in Mexico
- List of Billboard Argentina Hot 100 number-one singles of 2023
- List of Billboard Argentina Hot 100 top-ten singles in 2023
- List of Billboard Hot 100 top-ten singles in 2023
- List of Billboard Latin Pop Airplay number ones of 2023
- List of Billboard Hot Latin Songs and Latin Airplay number ones of 2023
- List of number-one hits of 2023 (Italy)
- List of number-one singles of 2023 (Spain)
- List of Billboard Global 200 top 10 singles of 2023
- Billboard Year-End Hot 100 singles of 2023
