= Andy Skinner =

Andy Skinner is an American DJ, concert promoter, and indie record store owner in Indianapolis, Indiana. He started A-Squared Industries with his wife Annie Skinner in 2005 and through that company they book and promote concerts, provide outside marketing consulting for entertainment industry clients, and they have also run a record label and hosted a radio show under the same company name. They were voted "Best DJs" by readers of NUVO Newsweekly in their 2012 Best Of Indy Readers Poll. Andy and his wife were also named to the list of "Top 10 Indianapolis-area couples making a difference in the arts" by The Indianapolis Star in 2013. In January 2013 Andy joined the board of directors of the Indianapolis chapter of the 501(c)(3) not-for-profit Girls Rock Camp, and in February 2014 Andy, his wife Annie, and their friend Eric Davis bought Indy CD & Vinyl, central Indiana's largest independent record store.
