= Luca Maria Invrea =

Doge of the Republic of Genoa and king of Corsica

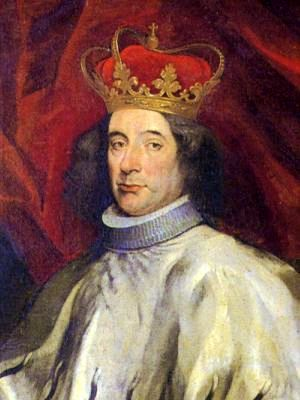

126th Doge of the Republic of Genoa
- In office August 13, 1681 – August 13, 1683
- Preceded by: Agostino Spinola
- Succeeded by: Francesco Maria Imperiale Lercari

Personal details
- Born: 1624 Genoa, Republic of Genoa
- Died: 1693 (aged 68–69) Genoa, Republic of Genoa

Luca Maria Invrea (Genoa, 1624 – Genoa, 1693) was the 126th Doge of the Republic of Genoa and king of Corsica.

== Biography ==
His mandate, the eighty-first in biennial succession and the one hundred and twenty-sixth in republican history, was judged in the annals as magnanimous, respectful of the people and the laws, and like his predecessors he sought to remedy the ever growing tension with Louis XIV of France which exploded in 1684 in the naval bombardment of Genoa. As doge he was also invested with the related biennial office of king of Corsica. At the end of the dogate on 13 August 1683, Luca Maria Invrea was elected perpetual prosecutor and continued to work in public circles. In the post-dogal period he also had the coveted position of prior of the chapel of San Giovanni of the Genoese cathedral. He died in Genoa in 1693.

== See also ==
- Republic of Genoa
- Doge of Genoa
