= Annie Skinner =

Annie Skinner is an American DJ, concert promoter, and indie record store owner in Indianapolis, Indiana.

She started A-Squared Industries with her husband Andy Skinner in 2005 and through that company they book and promote concerts, provide outside marketing consulting for entertainment industry clients, and they have also run a record label and hosted a radio show under the same company name. They were voted "Best DJs" by readers of NUVO Newsweekly in their 2012 Best Of Indy Readers Poll. Annie and her husband were also named to the list of "Top 10 Indianapolis-area couples making a difference in the arts" by The Indianapolis Star in 2013.

In November 2012 Annie joined the board of directors of the Indianapolis chapter of the 501(c)(3) not-for-profit Girls Rock Camp, and in February 2014 Annie, her husband Andy, and their friend Eric Davis bought Indy CD & Vinyl, central Indiana's largest independent record store.
