= Palazzo Stefano De Mari =

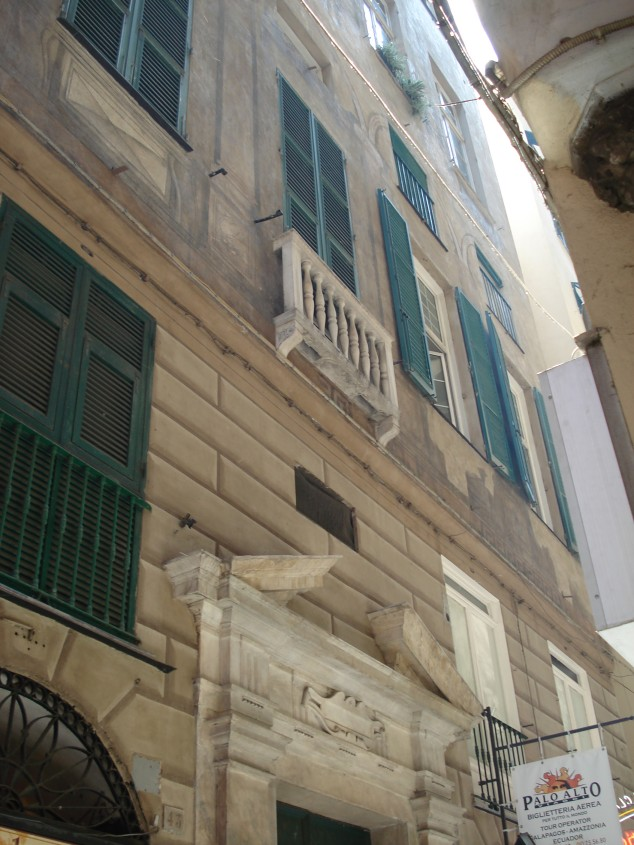
- Facade of the Palazzo Stefano De Mari in via San Luca 5
- Interactive map of the Palazzo Stefano De Mari area

General information
- Status: In use
- Type: Palace
- Architectural style: Mannerist
- Location: Genoa, Italy, 5, San Luca
- Coordinates: 44.408883°N 8.929997°E
- Current tenants: housing/offices
- Construction started: 16th century
- Completed: 16th century

UNESCO World Heritage Site
- Part of: Genoa: Le Strade Nuove and the system of the Palazzi dei Rolli
- Criteria: Cultural: (ii)(iv)
- Reference: 1211
- Inscription: 2006 (30th Session)

The Palazzo Stefano De Mari is a building located in Via San Luca in the Mercato di Banchi area in the historic centre of Genoa. On 13 July 2006 it was included in the list of the 42 palaces inscribed in the Rolli di Genova that became World Heritage sites announced by UNESCO.

== History ==
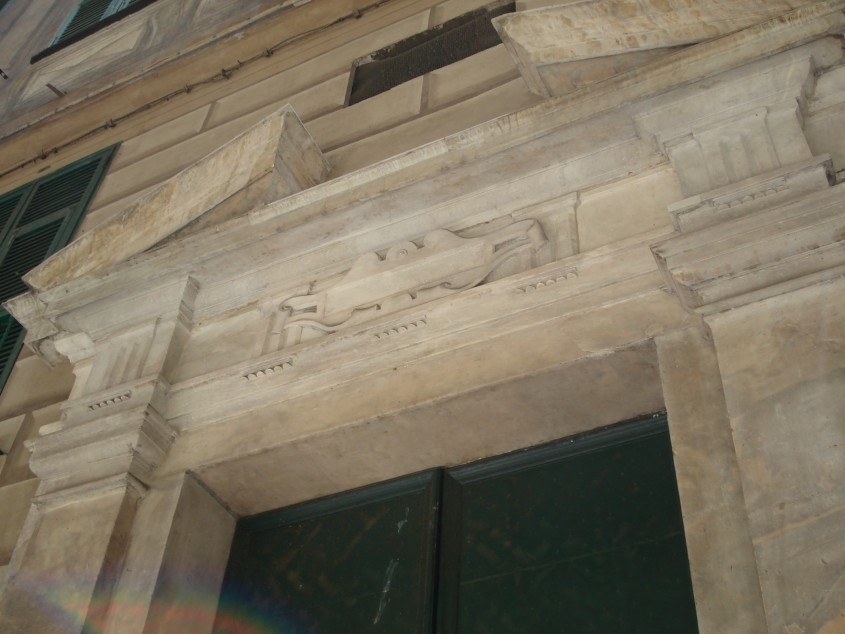
Portal detail

The palace was built in the 16th century on property of the Spinola. It has been included in the rolli since 1588, associated with the De Mari family.

Stefano De Mari, the most frequently imbued name, was a nobleman often in the running for dogato, later conferred on him in 1663; he belonged to a family linked to Spain and Naples through business and trade.

The ties with the city are manifested by the title of Prince Acquaviva of Naples held by Carlo, Stefano's nephew and the owner of the palace in 1798, as can be seen from the estimo.

== Design ==
The monumental late 15th century portal leads to a atrium renovated in the 19th century that holds a plaque commemorating an episode of the Resistance. The narrow façades are frescoed in quadrature. They are compensated for by the brightness of the inner courtyard. A porticoed staircase, partly filled in, runs above the courtyard. The building is divided into private flats. The monumental flat on the piano nobile retains two frescoed salons.

Both rooms have a mock colonnade on the walls attributed to the quadraturists Enrico and Antonio Haffner. The vault of the first hall features Episodes from Ancient History by Bernardo Castello. The vault of the second displays a fresco with Tobiolo and the Angel attributed to Giovanni Battista Carlone.

== Sources ==
- Luciana Müller Profumo, Le pietre parlanti, Genova, Carige, 1992, pp. 232–233.
