= Luca Spinola =

Luca Spinola may refer to:

- Luca Spinola (1489–1579), Doge of Genoa
- Luca Spinola (1628–1715), Doge of Genoa
