= Alessandro Grimaldi =

Doge of the Republic of Genoa and king of Corsica

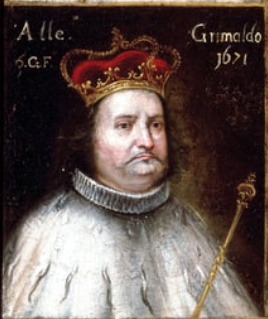

121st Doge of the Republic of Genoa
- In office 27 June 1671 – 27 June 1673
- Preceded by: Francesco Garbarino
- Succeeded by: Agostino Saluzzo

Personal details
- Born: 1621 Genoa, Republic of Genoa
- Died: 1683 (aged 61–62) Genoa, Republic of Genoa

Alessandro Grimaldi (Genoa, 1621 - Genoa, 1683) was the 121st Doge of the Republic of Genoa and king of Corsica.

== Biography ==
Grimaldi's mandate, the seventy-sixth in two-year succession and the one hundred and twenty-first in republican history, was marked by the new territorial war in the Riviera di Ponente between the republic and the Duchy of Savoy of Charles Emmanuel II, during 1672. Parallel to this episode he thwarted a related conspiracy against the state of Genoa hatched by Raffaele Della Torre, nephew of the homonymous jurist Della Torre, who, with the collaboration of the Duke of Savoy himself, would have led in the plan to a military invasion of Piedmontese troops in Savona and Genoa with the intent to revive their respective populations against the government. After the end of the Dogate on 27 June 1673, Grimaldi continued to serve the republic until his death in Genoa during 1683.

== See also ==
- Republic of Genoa
- Doge of Genoa
- House of Grimaldi
