= Francesco Garbarino =

Doge of the Republic of Genoa and king of Corsica

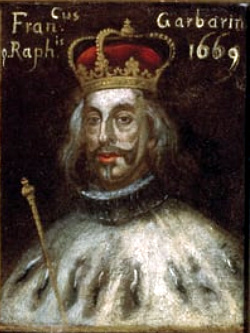

120th Doge of the Republic of Genoa
- In office June 18, 1669 – June 18, 1671
- Preceded by: Cesare Gentile
- Succeeded by: Alessandro Grimaldi

Personal details
- Born: 1607 Genoa, Republic of Genoa
- Died: 1672 (aged 64–65) Genoa, Republic of Genoa

Francesco Garbarino (Genoa, 1607 – Genoa, 1672) was the 120th Doge of the Republic of Genoa and king of Corsica.

== Biography ==
His dogate, the seventy-fifth in biennial succession and the one hundred and twentieth in republican history, was characterized by the continuation of various public works in the republican territory such as the Molo Nuovo in Genoa, the fortress of Vado Ligure and in the Savona area, on a favorable proposal by the protectors of the Bank of Saint George, the opening of a new road in the hinterland of Ceriale.

== See also ==
- Republic of Genoa
- Doge of Genoa
