= Francesco Maria Imperiale Lercari =

Doge of the Republic of Genoa and king of Corsica

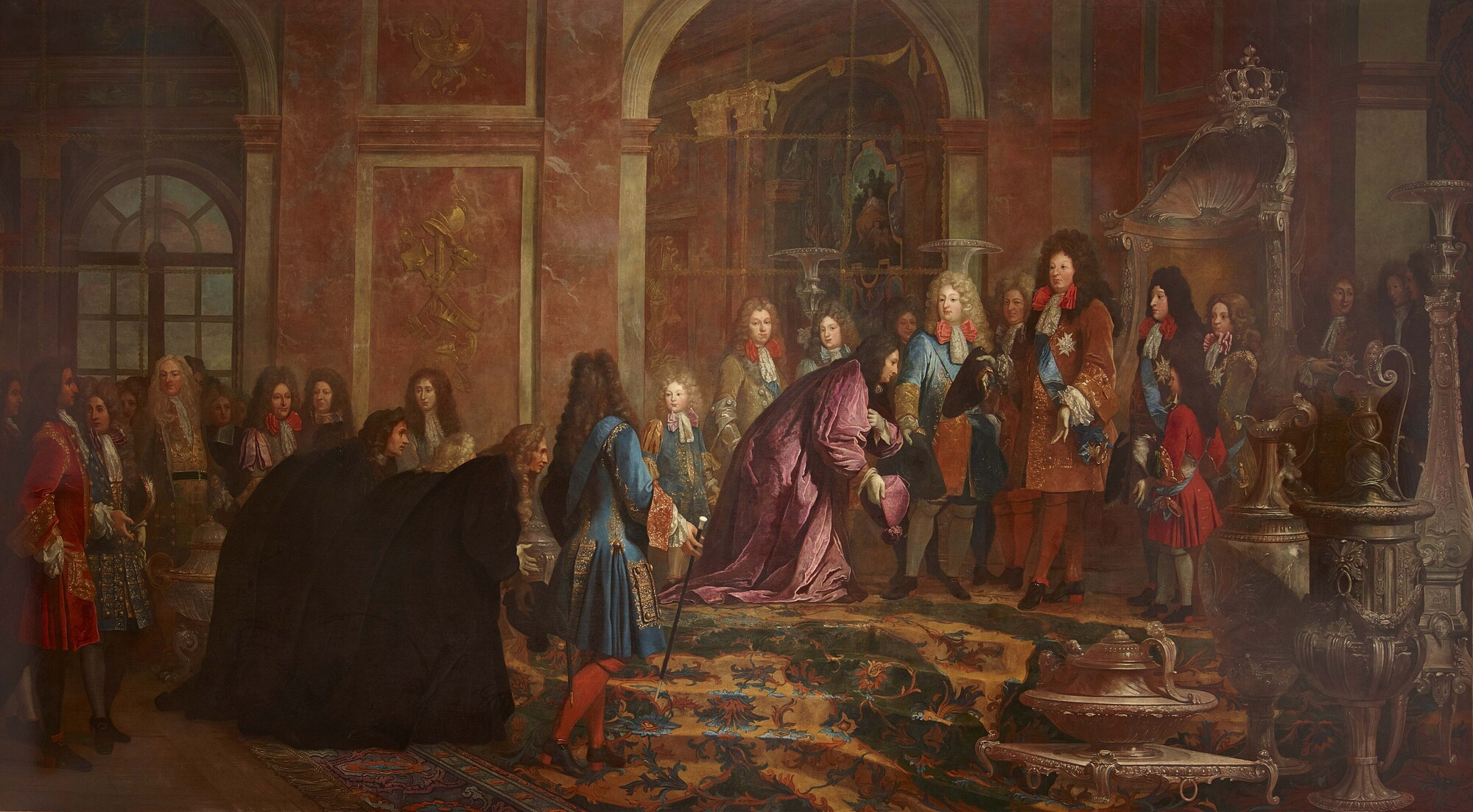
- Imperiale Lercari at Versailles on 15 May 1685

127th Doge of the Republic of Genoa
- In office 18 August 1683 – 18 August 1685
- Preceded by: Luca Maria Invrea
- Succeeded by: Pietro Durazzo

Personal details
- Born: 4 June 1629 Sampierdarena, Genoa, Republic of Genoa
- Died: 25 May 1712 (aged 82) Genoa, Republic of Genoa

Francesco Maria Imperiale Lercari (4 June 1629 in Sampierdarena – 25 May 1712 in Genoa) was the 127th Doge of the Republic of Genoa and king of Corsica.

== Biography ==
He ascended into the Dogate on 18 August 1683, and as the doge was also invested in the related biennial office of King of Corsica, and from the beginning had to face the increasingly explosive diplomatic issue with the Kingdom of France of Louis XIV. A state of tension which soon also aroused the concerns of the Genoese people and of the institutions so much so that, in view of an increasingly possible French attack, in May 1684 the doge Francesco Maria Imperiale Lercari arranged for the birth of a "war junta" composed by eight trusted members, chaired by him, as well as a new defense of the walls and of the territory as, among other things, his predecessors already prepared. On 17 May the siege of the French began, which lasted until 29 May and which saw the doge, the Genoese garrisons, and other militias from the Duchy of Milan and the courageous defense of the whole city, the naval bombardment of Genoa in 1684 was one of the most serious episodes in history of the Republic of Genoa. And at a further arrogant claim by the French crown to the Republic of Genoa, the doge himself, and other representatives were forced to go to Versailles on 15 May 1685 to perform an act of "reparation".

The reception in the royal palace was attended to in every detail, respectful of protocol and labels and all to the advantage of the prestige of the French court. But the doge, who to make this "reparative" gesture had to leave the Genoese borders, a very rare if not unique case, answered a spontaneous question by Louis XIV on what had struck him most in his palace with the words in Genoese "mi chi" (me here) as if to hold high, even on that occasion, the honor of the Republic which he represented. After his mandate ended on 18 August 1685, the eighty-second in two-year succession and the one hundred and twenty-seventh in republican history, he continued to work in public settings and to receive other assignments. He died in Genoa on 25 May 1712.

== See also ==
- Republic of Genoa
- Doge of Genoa
- Imperiali family
