= Agostino Saluzzo =

Doge of the Republic of Genoa and king of Corsica

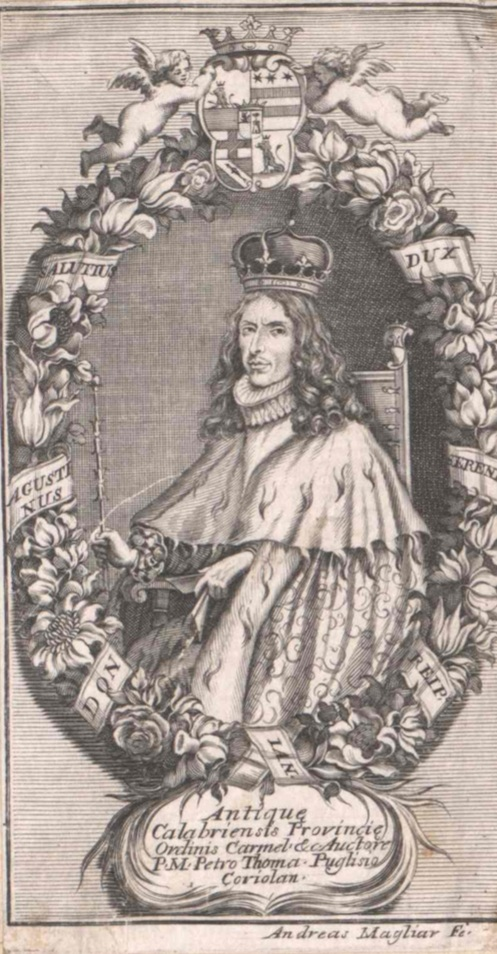

122nd Doge of the Republic of Genoa
- In office July 5, 1673 – July 4, 1675
- Preceded by: Alessandro Grimaldi
- Succeeded by: Antonio Da Passano

Personal details
- Born: 1631 Naples, Kingdom of Naples
- Died: 1700 (aged 68–69) Corigliano Calabro, Kingdom of Naples

Agostino Saluzzo (1631 in Naples – 1700 in Corigliano Calabro) was the 122nd Doge of the Republic of Genoa, king of Corsica, prince of Lequile and duke of Corigliano Calabro.

== Biography ==
Member of the Saluzzo family, that had its origins in Bonassola, moved to Genoa in 1438, but it was in the Kingdom of Naples that they had their economic and feudal interests and where the Neapolitan branches of the family developed. Agostino Saluzzo rose to dogal power with the election of July 5, 1673 and his mandate was seventy-seventh in two-year succession and one hundred and twenty-second in republican history. As doge he was also invested with the related biennial office of king of Corsica. After the Dogate ended on July 4, 1675, he would continue to serve the republic until his death in Corigliano Calabro in 1700.

== See also ==
- Republic of Genoa
- Doge of Genoa
