= Cesare Gentile =

Doge of the Republic of Genoa

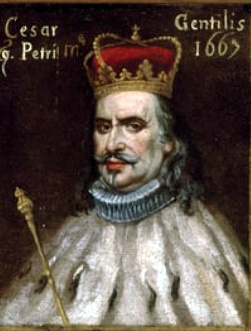

119th Doge of the Republic of Genoa
- In office May 10, 1667 – May 10, 1669
- Preceded by: Cesare Durazzo
- Succeeded by: Francesco Garbarino

Personal details
- Born: 1614 Genoa, Republic of Genoa
- Died: 1681 (aged 66–67) Genoa, Republic of Genoa

Cesare Gentile (1614–1681) was the 119th Doge of the Republic of Genoa and king of Corsica.

== Biography ==
At age 53, on May 10, 1667, the Grand Council elected Gentile as the new doge of Genoa, the seventy-fourth in two-year succession and the nineteenth in republican history. As doge he was also invested with the related biennial office of king of Corsica. He led an almost peaceful and administrative Dogate, except for some disagreements with the Chapter of the Genoa Cathedral, with the Genoese archbishop Giambattista Spinola and with the Inquisitor of the Holy Office. The dogate ceased on May 10, 1669 Cesare Gentile still dealt with public assignments. He died in Genoa in 1681.
