= Bombardment of Genoa =

1684 military event

- Part of the War of the Reunions
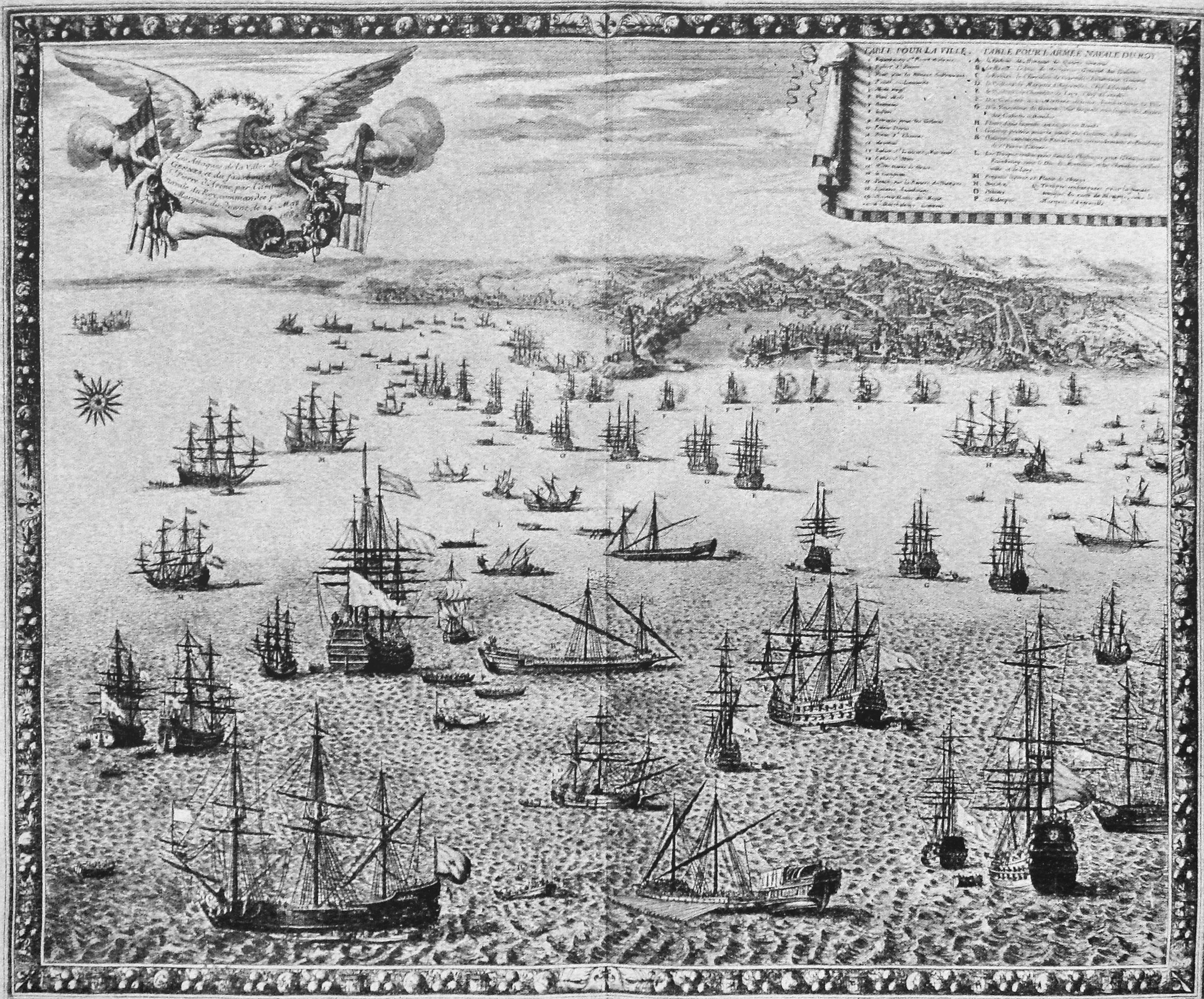
- Bombardment of Genoa by Duquesne in 1684, by Beaulieu le Donjon.
| Date | 18–28 May 1684 |
| Location | Genoa, Italy |
| Result | Inconclusive |

Belligerents
| (Kingdom of France) France | (Republic of Genoa) Genoa; Spain |

Commanders and leaders
| (Kingdom of France) Abraham Duquesne | (Republic of Genoa) Carlo Tasso (Republic of Genoa) Juan Maria Doria (Spain) Juan Tomas Enriquez de Cabrera |

The Bombardment of Genoa was a military event during the War of the Reunions when France bombarded the city of Genoa from the sea between May 18 and May 28, 1684.

== Background ==
The Republic of Genoa was strategically a very important ally of the Spanish Empire, as the Spanish Duchy of Milan was landlocked. All transport between Spain and Milan went through the port of Genoa. Furthermore, the financing of the Spanish crown by the Genoese bankers had made both countries natural allies ever since 1557, when the state bankruptcy of Philip II had ended the reign of the German Fuggers as Spanish financiers.

After the War of Devolution and the Franco-Dutch War (1672-78), it was clear that France had replaced Spain as the most powerful country in Europe. France's big clash with Genoa came in 1672, when a Dutch ship anchored in the city captured several French vessels. The French court accused Genoa of allowing the attack and retaliated confiscating all the Genoese ships in Provenza. In response, Genoese batteries bombarded all the French ships in sight, and when France demanded reparations, they only handed four artillerymen to be punished.

A new incident came in 1679, when a French fleet entering Genoa was not saluted, leading the fleet to bombard Sampierdarena without warning, although achieving little effect. Afterwards, Louis XIV was advised by his court to conquer Genoa, stating that its possession give him naval hegemony in the Mediterranean. This was never attempted, considering it too complicated, but the animosity remained. In October 1683, France annexed some territory in the Spanish Netherlands, starting the War of the Reunions. When Spain sent reinforcements via the port of Genoa, the French decided to punish the city.

== Opposing forces ==
The French fleet, commanded by Abraham Duquesne, was composed of 14 ships of the line, 19 galleys, 10 bomb vessels, 2 fireships, 2 troop carriers and 97 tartanes and skiffs. It was followed by other 10 galleys and carriers, possibly giving a total of up to 160 vessels of any size, with 756 guns. François Pidou de Saint Olon, who had become the first French resident envoy to the Republic of Genoa in 1682, was actively involved in the bombardment: indeed he communicated precious information to the French about the defence of Genoa and the position of the batteries of guns, being practically a spy.

For their part, suspecting French attacks, Genoese doge Francesco Maria Imperiale Lercari made preparations for the battle. He requested 1,000 soldiers to the Spanish governor of Milan, the Duke of Medina de Rioseco. Defense of the port was directed by captain Carlo Tasso.

== Battle ==
Without a formal declaration of war, Duquesne's fleet entered the port on May 17 pretending to come in peace, exchanging salutes with the Genoese batteries. His passenger Jean Baptiste Colbert, Marquis of Seignelay then demanded the city to hand over four galleys recently acquired as reinforcements and to send an embassy to apologize to the court of Louis XIV. Upon their negative, he bombarded the city for four days. By May 25, 6.000 cannonballs had been shot at the city, causing terrible damage. French parties were sent to demand their surrender, but Imperiale replied Genoa would not negotiate until the French had withdrawn.

The French also tried to land 3,500 land troops, choosing Albaro as a diversion and Sampierdarena as the main attack, but they were defeated by Genoese troops and volunteers from the Polcevera valley, as well as a Spanish tercio squad commanded by Francisco de Córdoba. The bombardment ended on May 29 when the French fleet ran out of gunpowder, after which it returned to Toulon. 16,000 cannonballs had fallen over the city at its ending.

== Aftermath ==
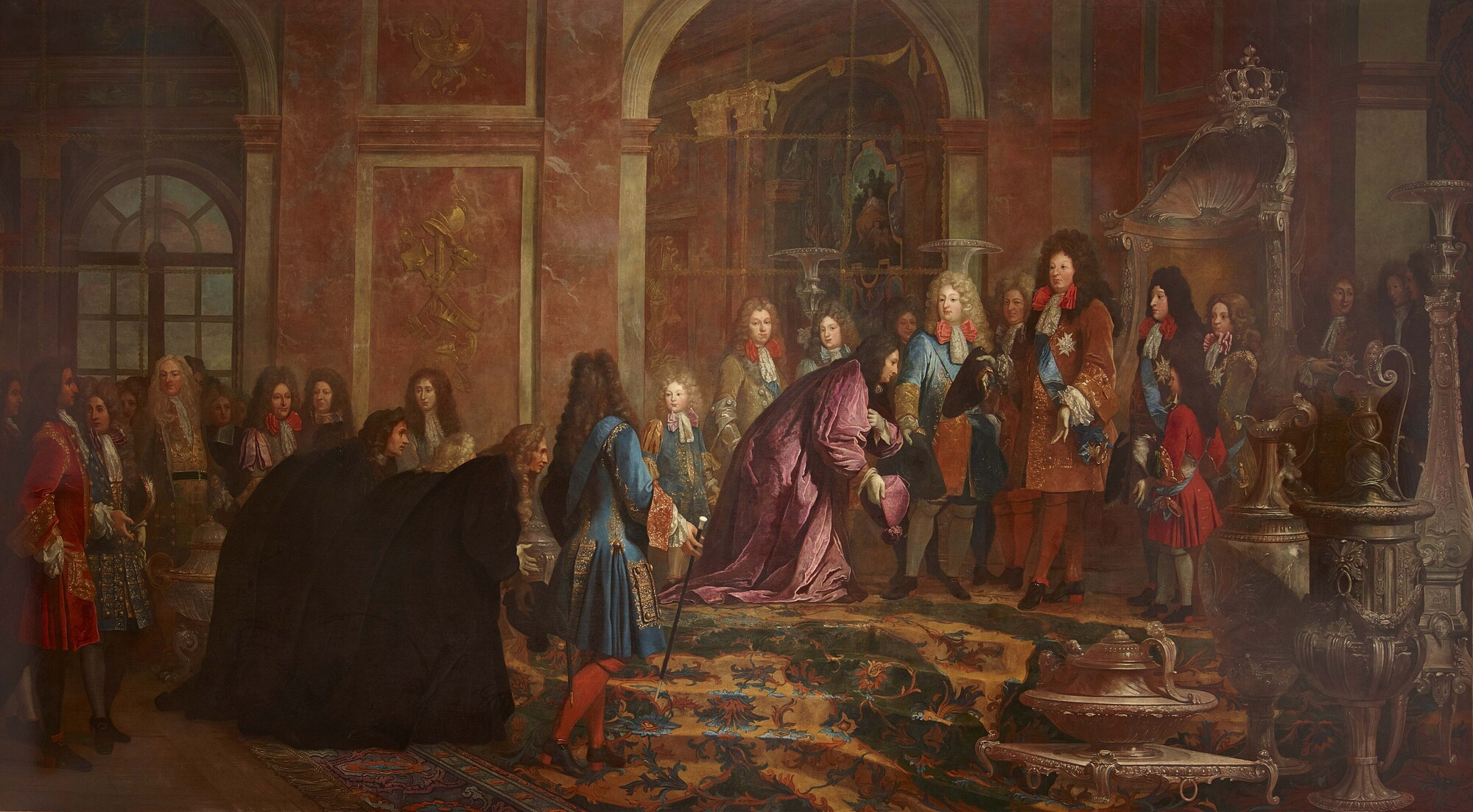
Imperiale at Versailles on 15 May 1685 Reparation faite à Louis XIV par le Doge de Gênes.15 mai 1685 by Claude Guy Halle, Versailles

The attack caused outrage across Europe, and galvanized the decision by Spain, the Dutch Republic and several factions of the Holy Roman Empire to form an alliance against France. Even in France, the attack was met with criticism, having in account that many French merchants residing in Genoa had been killed or went bankrupt with the bombardment. According to Augusto Vittorio Vecchi, Louis XIV came to repent the attack and condemned Seignelay's orders. Still, a Genoese and Papal embassy including Imperiale himself traveled to Paris to negotiate peace. In 1688, the alliance between the enemies of Louis XIV resulted in the League of Augsburg.

== Bibliography ==
- Dellepiane, Riccardo (1984). Mura e Forti di Genova. Nuova Editrice Genovese.
- Fernández Duro, Cesáreo (1895). Armada Española, desde la unión de los reinos de Castilla y Aragón (PDF). Vol. 5. Instituto de Historia Naval.

== Sources ==
Genova 1684, World History at KMLA
