= Antonio Da Passano =

Doge of the Republic of Genoa and king of Corsica

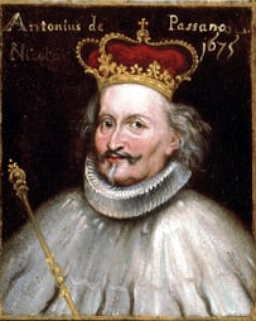

123rd Doge of the Republic of Genoa
- In office 11 July 1675 – 11 July 1677
- Preceded by: Agostino Saluzzo
- Succeeded by: Giannettino Odone

Personal details
- Born: 1599 Genoa, Republic of Genoa
- Died: 1681 (aged 81–82) Genoa, Republic of Genoa

Antonio Da Passano (Genoa, 1599 – Genoa, 1681) was the 123rd Doge of the Republic of Genoa and king of Corsica.

== Biography ==
Da Passano was elected Doge of the Republic with the election of 11 July 1675 and his mandate was the seventy-eighth in two-year succession and the one hundred and twenty-third in republican history. As doge he was also invested with the related biennial office of king of Corsica. His interventions include an institutional clash between his person and the supreme syndicators for the sending of some galleys, without his authorization, which granted to hunt down a Turkish ship that threatened the Ligurian coast.

== See also ==
- Republic of Genoa
- Doge of Genoa
