= Cesare Durazzo =

Doge of the Republic of Genoa and king of Corsica

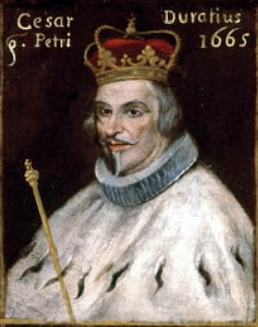

118th Doge of the Republic of Genoa
- In office 18 April 1665 – 18 April 1667
- Preceded by: Stefano De Mari
- Succeeded by: Cesare Gentile

Personal details
- Born: 1593 Genoa, Republic of Genoa
- Died: 8 December 1680 (aged 86–87) Genoa, Republic of Genoa

Cesare Durazzo (Genoa, 1593 - Genoa, 8 December 1680) was the 118th Doge of the Republic of Genoa and king of Corsica.

== Biography ==
At the age of 72, on 18 April 1665, Cesare Durazzo went up to the dogato with a good number of favorable votes from the Grand Council. His mandate, the seventy-third in biennial succession and the one hundred and eighteenth in republican history, was characterized by the reopening of commercial traffic with the East, especially with the Ottoman Empire thanks to the diplomatic commitment made by his nephews Giovan Agostino and Giovan Luca, to which benefited the republic first but also the Durazzo family themselves. As doge he was also invested with the related biennial office of king of Corsica.

The dogate ceased on 18 April 1667, the supreme trade unions positively judged his subsequent appointment as perpetual prosecutor. Despite advancing age, he continued to work for the Genoese state: he presided over the junta dei Confini; he negotiated financial affairs with the former doge Stefano De Mari in the Bank of Saint George; in 1674 he took part in the revision of the "chalice tickets". In 1678 he underwent another trial as a perpetual procurator from which he went unpunished. Durazzo probably died in Genoa on 8 December 1680.

== See also ==
- Republic of Genoa
- Doge of Genoa
- Durazzo family
