= Suzy Exposito =

American music writer

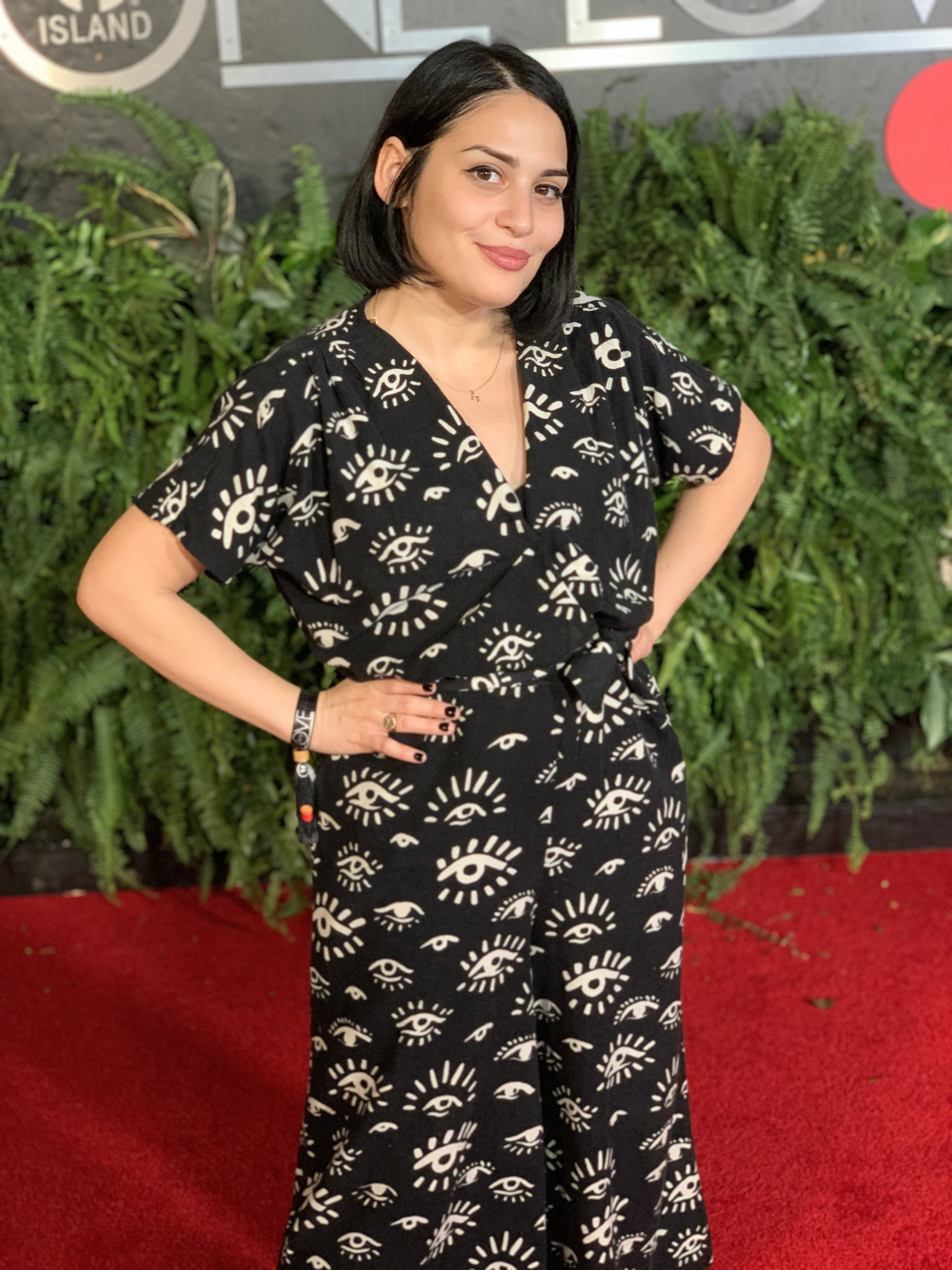
- Exposito in 2020
- Born: Suzanne Exposito; September 1, 1989 (age 37); Jersey City, New Jersey, U.S.
- Education: The New School
- Occupation: Music journalist
- Years active: 2009–present

Suzanne Exposito (born September 1, 1989), is an American writer. She has worked as a music reporter and columnist at the Los Angeles Times and previously as Latin music editor at Rolling Stone. In May 2020 she became the first Latina to write a cover story for the magazine, which was a profile of the Puerto Rican artist Bad Bunny.

Her writing has been featured in Pitchfork, Revolver magazine, Them. magazine and Teen Vogue. She was previously a contributing illustrator for Bitch as well as Rookie. She has appeared as a guest speaker at conferences such as NPR Music's Turning the Tables and StopSlut: A Conference on Sexuality, Bullying, and Rape.

== Early life ==
Exposito is half-Belizean; her mother is a native of the country. Her father is Cuban-American. Exposito graduated from Douglas Anderson School of the Arts in Jacksonville, Florida in 2007. She then attended Parsons School of Design in New York for three semesters, where she studied illustration. She subsequently attended the Eugene Lang College of Liberal Arts in New York, graduating in 2011 with a B.A. in Writing and a minor in Gender Studies.

== Career ==
Exposito began her career while still in college, volunteering at the Willie Mae Rock Camp for Girls, also known as Girls Rock! Camp. Beginning her involvement in 2009, she would continue as a camp counselor and band coach through 2018. She has also volunteered for the POC Zine Project, Planned Parenthood and Students Active for Ending Rape. From 2010 to 2015 she was the lead vocalist in the feminist punk band Shady Hawkins. In 2012, Exposito started writing and illustrating a serial comic called "The Best Song Ever" for Rookie; in 2013, she continued her role while also assistant editing at MTV World. In 2015, she began work as a staff contributor at Rolling Stone. In 2018, she was promoted to the post of Latin music editor for the magazine. In October 2020 she became a staff writer for the Los Angeles Times. In 2021, Exposito and two other Latino culture reporters responded to the release of In the Heights.

== Personal life ==
Exposito is bisexual.

In 2020, in partnership with Tierra Narrative, Exposito helped raise funds for Centro Corona, a Queens community center providing aid to Central American countries affected by coronavirus.
