= Oberto Della Torre =

Doge of the Republic of Genoa and king of Corsica

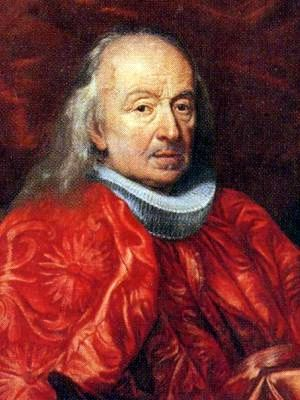

130th Doge of the Republic of Genoa
- In office 31 August 1689 – 1 September 1691
- Preceded by: Luca Spinola
- Succeeded by: Giovanni Battista Cattaneo Della Volta

Personal details
- Born: 1617 Genoa, Republic of Genoa
- Died: 1698 (aged 80–81) Genoa, Republic of Genoa

Oberto Della Torre (1617 in Genoa – 1698 in Genoa) was the 130th Doge of the Republic of Genoa and king of Corsica.

== Biography ==
During his mandate as Doge, the eighty-fifth in biennial succession and the one hundred and thirtieth in republican history, some disagreements with the Spanish Governor of the neighbouring Duchy of Milan are remembered due to the blockade of the income of the Genoese nobles in that territory, on the other hand, the Doge had cordial relations with the Charles II, as the Spanish Empire was a great ally of the Genoese Republic. After the end of his Dogate on 1 September 1691, Oberto Della Torre retired to private life. He died in Genoa in 1698.

== See also ==
- Republic of Genoa
- Doge of Genoa
