= Giannettino Odone =

Ruler of the Republic of Genoa and king of Corsica (1626–1698)

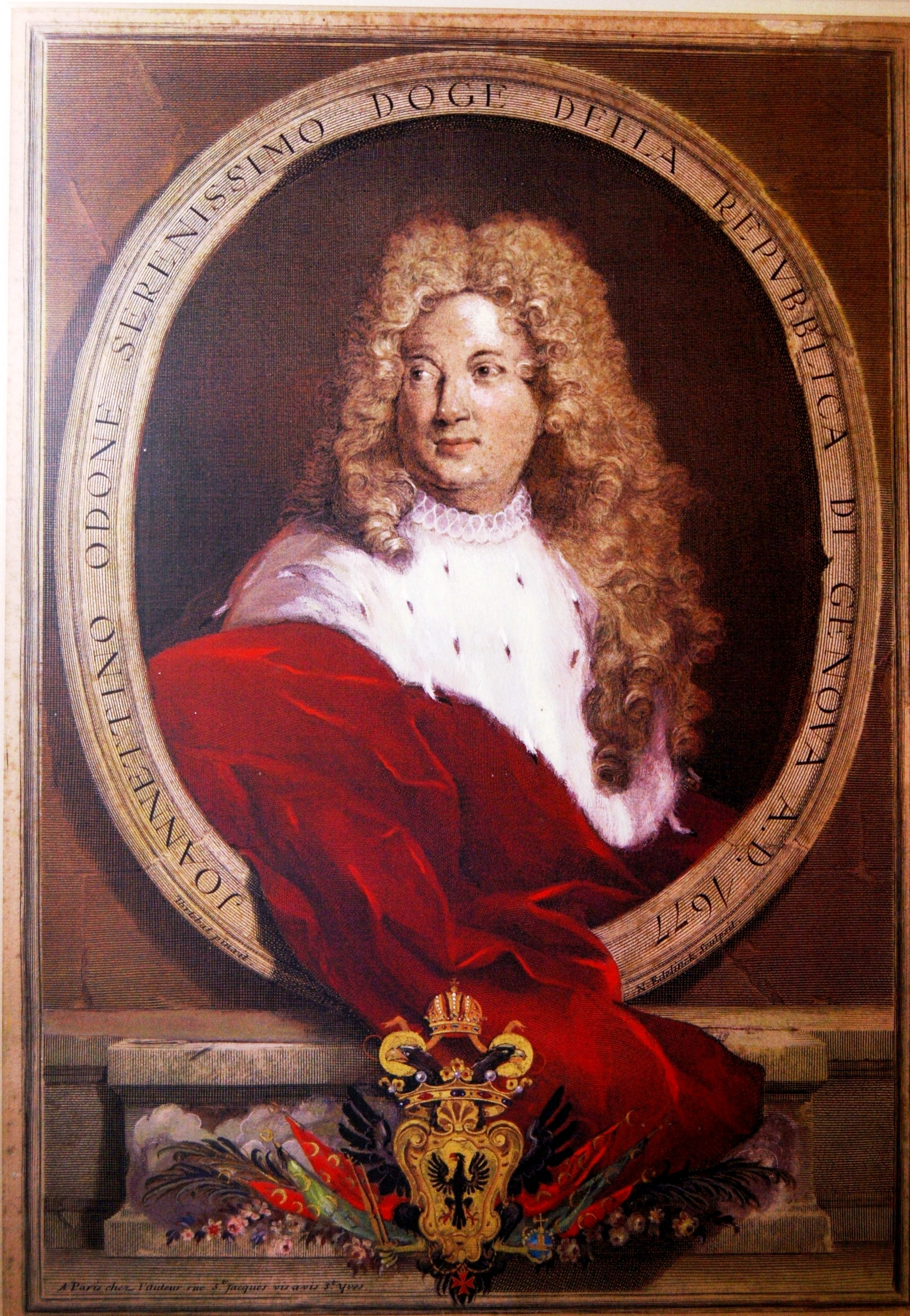
- Portrait by Nicolas Edelinck

124th Doge of the Republic of Genoa
- In office July 16, 1677 – July 16, 1679
- Preceded by: Antonio Da Passano
- Succeeded by: Agostino Spinola

Personal details
- Born: 1626 Genoa, Republic of Genoa
- Died: 1698 (aged 71–72) Genoa, Republic of Genoa

Giannettino Odone (1626–1698) was the 124th Doge of the Republic of Genoa and king of Corsica.

== Biography ==
On 16 July 1677, Odone was elected doge of Genoa, the seventy-ninth in the two-year succession, and the one hundred and twenty-fourth in the republic's history. As doge he was invested in the related biennial office of king of Corsica. Once his Dogate ended on 16 July 1679, he continued to serve the republic until 1694. Giannettino Odone died in Genoa in 1698.

== See also ==
- Republic of Genoa
- Doge of Genoa
