= Pietro Durazzo (1632–1699) =

Doge of the Republic of Genoa and king of Corsica

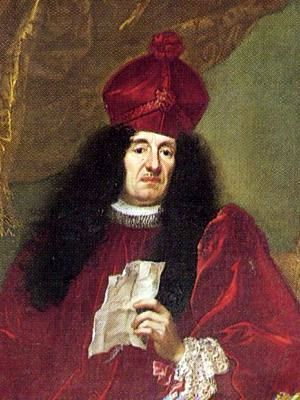

128th Doge of the Republic of Genoa
- In office 23 August 1685 – 23 August 1687
- Preceded by: Francesco Maria Imperiale Lercari
- Succeeded by: Luca Spinola

Personal details
- Born: 1632 Genoa, Republic of Genoa
- Died: 31 July 1699 (aged 66–67) Genoa, Republic of Genoa

Pietro Durazzo (Genoa, 1632 – Genoa, 31 July 1699) was the 128th Doge of the Republic of Genoa and king of Corsica.

== Biography ==
Elected on 23 August 1685, the new doge of Genoa, the eighty-third in biennial succession and the one hundred and twenty-eighth in republican history, the mandate of Pietro Durazzo was dedicated almost entirely to the reconstruction of the Genoese capital after the devastating French naval bombardment of a year earlier. As doge he was also invested with the related biennial office of king of Corsica. With the end of the Dogate's term, on 23 August 1687, which was followed by his appointment as perpetual prosecutor, he continued to serve the state in various positions. Durazzo died in Genoa on 31 July 1699.

== See also ==
- Republic of Genoa
- Doge of Genoa
