= Luca Spinola (1628–1715) =

129th Doge of Genoa

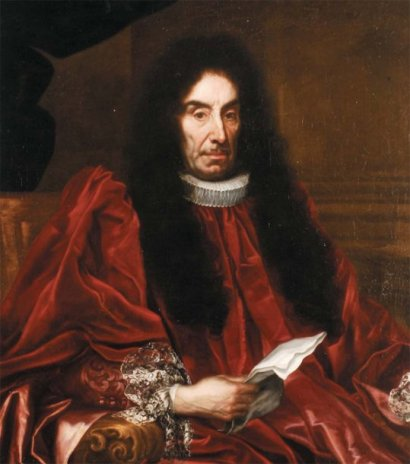

129th Doge of the Republic of Genoa
- In office 27 August 1687 – 27 August 1689
- Preceded by: Pietro Durazzo
- Succeeded by: Oberto Della Torre

Personal details
- Born: 1628 Genoa, Republic of Genoa
- Died: 1715 (aged 86–87) Genoa, Republic of Genoa

Luca Spinola (Genoa, 1628 - Genoa, 1715) was the 129th Doge of the Republic of Genoa and king of Corsica.

== Biography ==
Luca Spinola was born around 1628, son of Luciano of the noble branch of the Spinola di Luccoli and Francisca Ferrero, a native of Genoa. He was inscribed in the Golden Book of the Genoese nobility in 1655. He held, however, his first assignment for the Republic of Genoa in 1673 thus giving credit that the noble Luca Spinola initially preferred to take care of his family activities and personally govern the management of some of the family fiefdoms.

Only in 1680 saw an intensification of the commitments was more stable and continuous way that led him, among others, to be part of the junta extraordinary chaired by the Doge Francesco Maria Imperiale Lercari during the period of open hostility with Louis XIV of France. In 1685 he was appointed supreme syndicator. In the customs elections of 27 August 1687, his name won with four discarding votes compared to the other candidate, the Magnificent Bendinelli Negrone. As doge he was also invested with the related biennial office of king of Corsica.

=== Dogate ===
The eighty-fourth Doge of the Republic of Genoa in biennial succession and the one hundred and twenty-ninth in republican history, Spinola was dedicated to the continuation of the works of the new pier under the fortifications of San Giacomo di Carignano and to the reconstruction of the city after the French naval bombardment of 1684.

=== Personal life and later years ===
After the dogate ended on 27 August 1689 he continued to serve the Genoese state in assignments and commitments until the age of 75. Withdrawing to private life, Luca Spinola died in Genoa in 1715 where he was buried inside the abbey of San Gerolamo di Quarto dei mille.

Spinola was married to Vittoria De Marini and had no children.

== See also ==
- Doge of Genoa
- Republic of Genoa
- House of Spinola
