= Giovanni Battista Cattaneo Della Volta =

Doge of the Republic of Genoa and king of Corsica

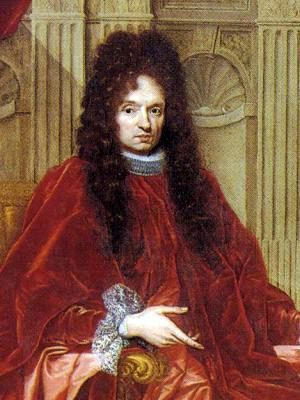

131st Doge of the Republic of Genoa
- In office 4 September 1691 – 5 September 1693
- Preceded by: Oberto Della Torre
- Succeeded by: Francesco Invrea

Personal details
- Born: 23 June 1638 Genoa, Republic of Genoa
- Died: 24 December 1721 (aged 83) Genoa, Republic of Genoa

Giovanni Battista Cattaneo Della Volta (Genoa, 23 June 1638 - Genoa, 24 December 1721) was the 131st Doge of the Republic of Genoa and king of Corsica.

== Biography ==
The mandate of the doge Cattaneo Della Volta, the eighty-sixth in biennial succession and the one hundred and thirty-first in republican history, was characterized by the ordinary administration of the state. Among its most important measures was the authorization granted to the community of Nervi for the construction of the new marina. After the dogate ended on 5 September 1693, he left the biennial residence of Doge's Palace for his palace in the historic center of Genoa. In 1713 he retired to private life and died on 24 December 1721 in Genoa.

== See also ==
- Republic of Genoa
- Doge of Genoa
