= Agostino Spinola (Doge of Genoa) =

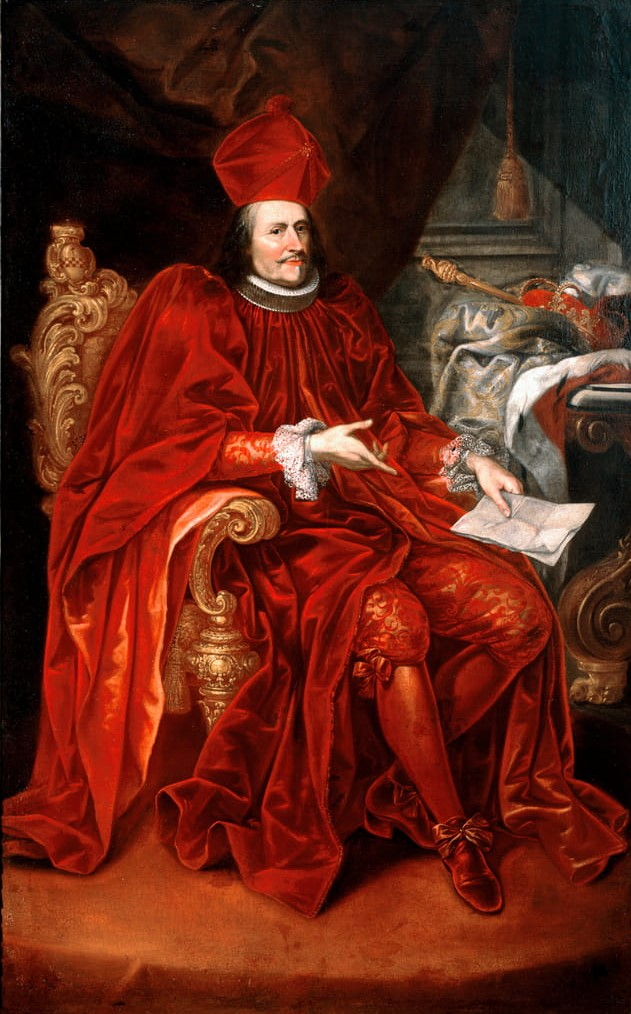
- Portrait by Giovanni Enrico Vaymer, c. 1681

125th Doge of the Republic of Genoa
- In office 29 July 1679 – 29 July 1681
- Preceded by: Giannettino Odone
- Succeeded by: Luca Maria Invrea

Personal details
- Born: 1624 Genoa, Republic of Genoa
- Died: 1692 (aged 67–68) Genoa, Republic of Genoa

Agostino Spinola (1624–1692) was the 125th Doge of the Republic of Genoa and king of Corsica.

== Biography ==
Spinola was born in Genoa around 1624. With the age of majority he received his first public offices in some offices and magistrates of the Republic of Genoa, alternating with his many jobs at the Bank of Saint George. At the outbreak of the plague in the republic, between 1656 and 1657, he worked with other local nobles in providing care, assistance and administrative management. In the following time he also took on the role of the extraordinary ambassador to the Spanish court where he dealt with the crown the well-known question of the territorial rights advanced by Genoa on the Marquisate of Finale.

At the age of 55, he ascended to the dogate with the election of 29 July 1679: the eightieth in biennial succession and the one hundred and twenty-fifth in republican history. As doge he was also invested with the related biennial office of king of Corsica.

He led an almost quiet two-year term and as usual, except for the delicate question of diplomatic relations increasingly tense with Louis XIV of France that in the year of 1679, under the dogate of Giannettino Odone, bombarded the Genovese coast near Sampierdarena with about 3,000 bullets. Signs and tensions that culminated in 1684 in the naval bombardment of Genoa by the French fleet.

After the doge's office on 29 July 1681, it is reported that Agostino Spinola still continued to serve the republic in offices and public offices. He died in Genoa during 1692; the burial place is unknown.

== See also ==
- Doge of Genoa
- Republic of Genoa
