= Girls Rock! =

- Girls Rock! film poster
- Directed by: Arne Johnson; Shane King
- Produced by: Arne Johnson
- Cinematography: Shane King
- Edited by: Diana J. Brodie; Arne Johnson; Shane King
- Distributed by: Shadow Distribution
- Release dates: April 21, 2007 (Toronto Hot Docs Film Festival); March 7, 2008 (United States)
- Running time: 90 minutes
- Country: United States
- Language: English

Girls Rock! is a 2007 documentary film that follows four 8-18-year-old girls at the Rock and Roll Camp for Girls in Portland, Oregon, United States.

At Rock and Roll Camp, girls ranging in age from eight to 18 are taught that "it is 100% okay to be exactly who you are." The girls have a week to select a band, an instrument they may have never played before, and write a song. In between, they are taught by indie rock stars such as Carrie Brownstein from Sleater-Kinney various lessons of empowerment from self-defense to anger management. At the end of the week, all the bands perform a concert for over 700 people. The film follows several campers: Laura, a Korean adoptee obsessed with death metal; Misty, who is emerging from a life of meth addiction, homelessness and gang activity; and Amelia, an eight-year-old who writes experimental rock songs about her dog Pipi.

The film ultimately explores what happens to the girls as they are given a temporary reprieve from being sexualized, analyzed, and pressured to conform. Young girls are given the opportunity to express themselves through the culture of rock music by participating in activities that challenge gender stereotypes, encourage confidence, and build self esteem through being supported by a community and environment that values the concept of feminism and female empowerment. The camp provides the girls with a chance to build a community and develop a connection with other young girls through forming bands, writing songs and creating a space that allows them to grow and express themselves without the pressure of societal norms that women face.

== Screenings ==
The movie opened in the following cities on March 7, 2008: New York, Los Angeles, Portland, Seattle, San Francisco, Berkeley, Chicago.

== Critical reception ==
The film received generally favorable reviews from critics. On review aggregator website Rotten Tomatoes, the film holds a 70% approval rank based on 43 reviews, with an average rating of 6.4/10. The site's consensus states: "Girls Rock! is an inspiring and enjoyable documentary of girls' empowerment and self-discovery". Metacritic reported the film had an average score of 62 out of 100, based on 7 reviews.

Ty Burr of the Globe and Mail said that "How are girls supposed to behave in a culture that tells them they're Disney princesses for the first 12 years and sex toys after that? Girls Rock! has one answer: Strap on a Fender and rage against the machine".

Ultimate Guitar gives Girls Rock! 7 out of 10, while Kimberly Jones of The Austin Chronicle gave it 2.5 out of 5.

Jeannette Catsoulis of The New York Times praised the film, saying that "Young women find expression for more than their music in Girls Rock!, a jubilant documentary about a place where power chords and empowerment go hand in hand".

Noel Murray of The A.V. Club pointed out that "Frankly, the scenes of these girls trying to work together and share ideas are enough to make the movie's point".

== Bibliography ==
- Hertz, Todd (February 29, 2008). "Girls Rock!". Christianity Today.
