= Stefano De Mari =

Doge of the Republic of Genoa

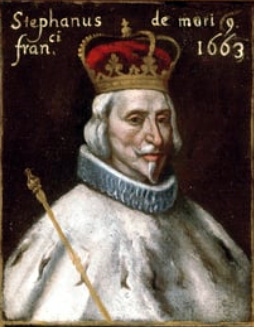

117th Doge of the Republic of Genoa
- In office 13 April 1663 – 12 April 1665
- Preceded by: Antoniotto Invrea
- Succeeded by: Cesare Durazzo

Personal details
- Born: 1593 Genoa, Republic of Genoa
- Died: 25 February 1674 (aged 80–81) Genoa, Republic of Genoa

Stefano De Mari (Genoa, 1593 - Genoa, 25 February 1674) was the 117th Doge of the Republic of Genoa and king of Corsica.

== Biography ==
Among the important events of his mandate, doge De Mari paid homage to the new Genoese archbishop Giambattista Spinola with whom, towards the end of the customs mandate, he had personal conflicts, as well as with the Senate itself. He left the Doge's office on 12 April 1665 but continued to serve the republic as head of the Corsican magistrate, the war magistrate and financial positions at Bank of Saint George. De Mari died in Genoa on 25 February 1674.

== See also ==
- Republic of Genoa
- Doge of Genoa
