= Augusto Vittorio Vecchi =

Augusto Vittorio Vècchi (22 December 1842, Marseille – 6 September 1932, Forte dei Marmi), known under the pseudonym Jack La Bolina, was an officer in the Regia Marina (Italian navy) and a writer on maritime subjects. He has been called "the Italian Captain Marryat".

== Biography ==
Vecchi graduated from the Regia Scuola di Marina di Genoa (Royal Naval School Genoa) and became a midshipman in 1861. He became a sub-lieutenant in 1863 and a lieutenant in 1866. He participated in the Battle of Lissa in 1866 and resigned from the Regia Marina in 1872.

Vecchi was an editor for Caffaro; giornale politico quotidiano and the Roman newspaper Fanfulla. In 1879 he founded the Regio Yacht Club Italiano.

== Selected works ==
- Bozzetti di mare. 1874.
- Leggende di mare. Nicola Zanichelli. 1879.
- Nuove Leggende di mare. 1880.
- La Vita e le gesta di Giuseppe Garibaldi. N. Zanichelli. 1882.
- Racconti di mare e di Guerra. 1887.
- Le fortune della Indipendenza Italica. 1888.
- Racconti, fiabe e fantasia. 1888.
- Ironie blande. 1889.
- Storia generale della marina militare. Tip. di R. Giusti. 1895.
- Memorie di un luogotenente di vascello. 1897.
- La marina contemporanea. 1899.
- L'Italia marinara o il lido della patria. 1899.
- Vita di bordo. 1914.
- La guerra sul mare. 1915.
- Storia del mare. 1923.
- Al servizio del mare italiano. 1928.
- Cacce su terra e su mare. 1933.
