= Rock and Roll Camp for Girls =

Rock n Roll Camp for girls (non-profit Organization)

Rock 'n' Roll Camp for Girls
- Formation: Summer 2001, Portland Oregon
- Region served: Brazil, Canada, Europe, UAE, US, Argentina
- Members: Over 60 camps world wide
- Website: www.girlsrockcampalliance.org

The Rock 'n' Roll Camp for Girls is both the original Rock ‘n’ Roll Camp for Girls non-profit organization based in Portland, Oregon, United States, and the common name associated with the Girls Rock Camp movement of youth organizations for girls inspired by the original camp in Portland. The camp in Portland gives girls ages 8–18 the opportunity to learn rock instruments, form bands, write songs, and perform. The mostly volunteer and female staff strives to inspire self-esteem and mutual support among diverse campers within this rock band framework. The first camp was held in August 2001.

The camp grew out of founder Misty McElroy's 2000 project as a women's studies major at Portland State University.

Inspired by the work from the original Portland project, there are now Girls Rock Camps all over the globe. The mission of the Rock ‘n’ Roll Camp for Girls has become a DIY global movement that seeks to empower girls through music. Girls Rock Camps now take place in more than 40 American cities including New York (Willie Mae Rock Camp for Girls), Austin, Texas (Girls Rock Austin), Charlotte, North Carolina (Girls Rock CLT), Atlanta, Georgia (Y'all Rock Camp ATL), Las Vegas, Nevada (Girls Rock, Las Vegas), Washington, DC, (Girls Rock, DC), Philadelphia, Pennsylvania (Girls Rock! Philly), Seattle, Washington (Rain City Rock Camp), Indianapolis, Indiana (Girls Rock! Indianapolis), Los Angeles, California (Rock n Roll Camp for Girls, Los Angeles), Athens, Ohio (Athens Girls Rock Camp), Oklahoma City, Oklahoma (Rock 'n Roll Camp for Girls, OKC) and Tulsa, Oklahoma (Girls Rock! Tulsa). Girls Rock camps take place globally in Dubai (Rock Camp for Girls, UAE), Germany (Ruby Tuesday Berlin), Brazil (Girls Rock Camp Brasil), Canada (many, see below table for locations), Sweden (Popkollo), Finland (Girls Rock! Finland) and Australia (Girls Rock! Australia). Each camp is independently run, but organizers exchange ideas and share approaches by way of the international Girls Rock Camp Alliance.

== Camps around the globe ==
The Rock n Roll Camp for Girls mission is expanding as people become inspired to start chapters in their hometowns all over the world. Each camp is put together by the community it represents, and because of this many camps offer different versions of similar programming.

Canada	United States	Europe	Australasia	South America	United Arab Emirates
Mississauga	Jacksonville, Florida	Berlin (Ruby Tuesday)	Canberra (Founded 2016)	Brazil (Founded 2013)	Dubai
Montreal	New York, New York (Willie Mae Rock Camp for Girls, Founded 2003)	Paris	Brisbane	Buenos Aires, Argentina (Chicas Amplificadas, Founded 2016)	
Peterborough	Austin, Texas (Girls Rock Austin)	Sweden (Popkollo) (Founded 2003)	Melbourne		
Saskatoon (Founded 2015)	Los Angeles, California (Founded 2010)	Iceland (Stelpur Rokka!) (Founded 2012)	Wollongong		
Toronto	Boston, Massachusetts	Helsinki, Finland (Rock Donna and Girls Rock! Finland) (Founded 2012)	Sydney		
Victoria	Seattle, Washington	Lower Austria, Austria (Pink Noise Girls Rock Camp)	Auckland, Aotearoa	Curitaba (Founded 2018)	
Vancouver	Portland, Oregon (Founded 2001)	Munich, Germany	Wellington, Aotearoa		
Dawson City	Boise, Idaho	Stavanger, Norway (Loud!) (Founded 2012)	Hamilton, Aotearoa		
Whitehorse	Vermont		Palmerston North, Aotearoa		
St. John's, Newfoundland	Rhode Island				
Winnipeg	Rochester, New York	Joint Euro Camp, Pink Noise (Founded 2018)			
	Philadelphia, Pennsylvania (Girls Rock! Philly, Founded 2007)				
	Roanoke, Virginia				
	Richmond, Virginia (Girls Rock RVA)				
	Washington, D.C. (Founded 2008)				
	Athens, Ohio				
	Columbia, Missouri (Como Girls Rock Camp)				
	Columbus, Ohio (Girlz Rhythm and Rock Camp)				
	Grand Rapids, Michigan				
	Madison, Wisconsin				
	Twin Cities, Minnesota (Girls Rock n Roll Retreat)				
	Chicago, Illinois (Founded 2006)				
	Indianapolis, Indiana (Founded 2010)				
	Milwaukee, Wisconsin				
	Warren, Ohio (Girlz Voices)				
	Oakland, California (Bay Area Girls Rock Camp, Founded 2008)				
	Anchorage, Alaska				
	Las Vegas, Nevada				
	Santa Barbara, California (Girls Rock SB)				
	Orange County, California				
	Denver, Colorado (Founded 2008)				
	Omaha, Nebraska				
	Des Moines, Iowa (Girls Rock! Des Moines)				
	Athens, Georgia				
	Atlanta, Georgia				
	Columbia, South Carolina				
	Charleston, South Carolina				
	Durham, North Carolina (Founded 2004)				
	Orlando, Florida (Rock n Roll Camp for Girls Central Florida)				
	Dallas, Texas				
	Houston, Texas				
	Pittsburgh, Pennsylvania				
	Knoxville, Tennessee				
	Charleston, West Virginia (Rock Camp for Girls Appalachia)				
	Murfreesboro, Tennessee (Southern Girls Rock Camp)				
	Baton Rouge, Louisiana				
	Oklahoma City, Oklahoma (Rock 'n’ Roll Camp for Girls OKC)				
	Seattle, Washington (Rain City Rock N Roll Camp for Girls)				
	Bellingham, Washington (Bellingham Girls Rock Camp)				
	South East Los Angeles, California (Chicas Rockeras)				
	Nashville, Tennessee (Y'eah, Founded 2003)				
	Charm City, Baltimore (Founded 2025)				
	New Orleans (Founded 2014)				
	Detroit (Founded 2014)				
	Asheville, North Carolina (Founded 2014)				
	Charlotte, North Carolina (Founded 2014)				
	Carbondale, Illinois (Y'all Rock, Founded 2014)				
	London (Spark the noise, Founded 2015)				
	Japan (Founded 2015)				
	Lawrence Illinois (Amplify Lawrence, Founded 2015)				
	Lawrence Illinois (Amplify Lawrence, Founded 2015)				
	Lima, Ohio (Warmi Rock Camp, Founded 2016)				
	Pine Ridge (Rock the Rez, Founded 2016)				
	St. Pete (Founded 2016)				
	Canberra (Founded 2016)				
	Dublin (Founded 2016)				
	North Ireland (Founded 2016)				
	Serbia (Founded 2016)				
	Mozambique (Loud, Founded 2017)				
	Porto Alegre (Founded 2017)				
	Rosebud, South Dakota, Pink Noise (Founded 2018)				
	Tulsa, Oklahoma, Girls Rock! Tulsa				

== Girls rock camp alliance ==
The Girls Rock Camp Alliance (GRCA) is an alliance of music camps who share the same mission of empowerment through music. The purpose of the GRCA is to create a physical and a virtual space for camps to share ideas and resources, as well as a space for organizers of camps to meet in person and gain inspiration from each other. The GRCA holds one conference a year where organizers from individual camps gather to skill build, resource share, build community, and talk about different camp philosophies as well as movement building.

== Girls rock camp in culture and media ==
In 2006, the Rock ‘n’ Roll Camp for Girls was the subject of Stacy Lynn Singer's dissertation at Georgia State University, entitled I'm Not Loud Enough to be Heard, Rock n Roll Camp for Girls, and Feminist Quests for Equity, Community, and Cultural Production. In 2008, Girls Rock! was released. It is a documentary that follows the stories of three young girls through their week at the Rock n Roll Camp for Girls in Portland, Oregon. Also in 2008, a book was written by the Rock n Roll Camp for Girls to encourage girls to play music, which featured illustrations by Graphic Artist Nicole Georges. This book contained a short history of women in rock music, and featured contributions from former volunteers of camps such as Nicole Georges, STS, Carrie Brownstein (Portlandia/Sleater Kinney) and members of The Gossip. In 2012, the documentary Hit So Hard (about drummer Patty Schemel from the band Hole) featured a portion about the Rock n Roll Camp for Girls.

== Other programs ==
Many Girls Rock Camps offer programs other than a summer camp, but with the same idea. Programs that are offered by some Girls Rock Camps include but are not limited to: Ladies Rock Camps, after school programs, and special events. Ladies Rock Camp (or in some places Women's Rock Camp) is usually a 2-3 day program where adult women are exposed to similar workshops and musical instrument instruction that girls receive during summer camp. After school programs differ depending on the location, but range from strictly music driven programming to community and school focused programs. Many Girls Rock Camps offer special events during the year ranging from movie nights to concerts.

Queer Rock Camp Olympia was founded in 2011 in Olympia, Washington, and was a week long summer camp program for queer youth ages 12–21 that was inspired by the Rock n Roll Camp for Girls program. Like Girls Rock Camps, they sought to empower queer youth through music, creativity, expression, and workshops that aim to foster those goals. The camp reorganized as the Queer and Trans Youth Music Project before offering its last session in 2019. Queer Rock Camp Pdx was founded in Portland, Oregon in 2015 and partners with local organizations Rock and Roll Camp for Girls and the Sexual & Gender Minority Youth Resource Center to offer a free week-long summer camp of intergenerational music, arts and empowerment-based programming for youth ages 12-23.

== See also ==
- Culture of Portland, Oregon
- Girls Rock!, a documentary film about the Rock and Roll Camp for Girls
