= Provenza =

Provenza is a surname. Notable people with the surname include:

- Karlee Provenza, American politician
- Paul Provenza (born 1957), American actor, comedian, and filmmaker
- Louie Provenza, fictional character from The Closer

Provenza may also refer to:

- "Provenza" (song), a 2022 song by Karol G
- Wenzhou Provenza F.C., Chinese football club

== See also ==
- Provence
- Provincia
