= List of state leaders in the 18th-century Holy Roman Empire =

This is a list of state leaders in the 18th century (1701–1800) AD, of the Holy Roman Empire.

== Main ==
- Holy Roman Empire, Kingdom of Germany

- Emperors Elect, Kings –

- Leopold I, Emperor Elect, King (1658–1705)
- Joseph I, Emperor Elect (1705–1711), King (1690–1711)
- Charles VI, Emperor Elect, King (1711–1740)
- Charles VII, Emperor Elect, King (1742–1745)
- Francis I, Emperor Elect (1745–1765), King (1745–1764)
- Joseph II, Emperor Elect (1765–1790), King (1764–1790)
- Leopold II, Emperor Elect, King (1790–1792)
- Francis II, Emperor Elect, King (1792–1806)

- Imperial Vice Chancellors (Reichsvizekanzlers, 1527–1806) –

- Dominik Andreas I. von Kaunitz, Vice Chancellor (1698–1705)
- Friedrich Karl von Schönborn-Buchheim, Vice Chancellor (1705–1734)
- Johann Adolf Graf von Metsch, Vice Chancellor (1734–1740)
- Johann Georg Graf von Königsfeld, Vice Chancellor (1742–1745)
- Rudolph Joseph von Colloredo, Vice Chancellor (1745–1788)
- Franz de Paula Gundaker von Colloredo, Vice Chancellor (1789–1806)

== Austrian ==
- Archduchy of Austria (complete list) –

- Leopold VI, Archduke (1657, 1665–1705)
- Joseph I, Archduke (1705–1711)
- Charles III, Archduke (1711–1740)
- Maria Theresa, Archduchess (1740–1780)
- Francis I Stephen, Archduke (1740–1765)
- Joseph II, Archduke (1765–1790)
- Leopold VII, Archduke (1790–1792)
- Francis II, Archduke (1792–1804), Emperor (1804–1835)

- Principality of Auersperg (complete list) –

- Johann Ferdinand, Prince (1677–1705)
- Franz Karl, Prince (1705–1713)
- Heinrich Joseph Johann, Prince (1713–1783)
- Karl Josef, Prince (1783–1800)
- Wilhelm I, Prince (1800–1806)

- Prince-Bishopric of Brixen (complete list) –

- Johann Franz Graf Khuen of Belasi, Prince-bishop (1685–1702)
- Kaspar Ignaz of Künigl, Prince-bishop (1702–1747)
- Leopold of Spaur, Prince-bishop (1747–1778)
- Ignaz of Spaur, Prince-bishop (1779–1779)
- Joseph of Spaur, Prince-bishop (1779–1791)
- Karl Franz Lodron, Prince-bishop (1791–1803)

- Prince-Bishopric of Chur (complete list) –

- Ulrich VII. Freiherr von Federspiel, Prince-bishop (1692–1728)
- Joseph Benedikt Freiherr von Rost, Prince-bishop (1728–1754)
- Johannes Baptist Anton Freiherr von Federspiel, Prince-bishop (1755–1777)
- Franz Dionys von Rost, Prince-bishop (1777–1793)
- Karl Rudolf Graf von Buol-Schauenstein, Prince-bishop (1794–1803)

- Fürstenberg-Fürstenberg (complete list) –

- Joseph Wilhelm Ernst, Count (1704–1716), Prince (1716–1762)
- Joseph Wenceslaus, Prince (1762–1783)
- Joseph Maria Benedict, Prince (1783–1796)
- Charles Joachim, Prince (1796–1804)

- Principality of Heitersheim (complete list) –

- Hermann von Wachtendonk, Prince-prior (1683–1704)
- Bernhard Wilhelm von Rhede, Prince-prior (1704–1721)
- Goswin Hermann Otto von Merveldt, Prince-prior (1721–1727)
- Philipp Wilhelm Graf von Nesselrode und Reichenstein, Prince-prior (1728–1752)
- Philipp Joachim von Prassberg, Prince-prior (1754–1754)
- Johann Baptist von Schauenburg, Prince-prior (1755–1775)
- Franz Christoph Sebastian Freiherr von Remchingen, Prince-prior (1775–1777)
- Josef Benedikt von Reinach-Foussemagne, Prince-prior (1777–1796)
- Ignaz Balthasar Rinck von Baldenstein, Prince-prior (1796–1806)

- Principality of Liechtenstein (complete list) –

- Hans-Adam I, Prince (1684–1712)
- Josef Wenzel I, Prince (1712–1718)
- Anton Florian, Prince (1718–1721)
- Josef Johann Adam, Prince (1721–1732)
- Johann Nepomuk Karl, Prince (1732–1748)
- Josef Wenzel I, Prince (1748–1772)
- Franz Josef I, Prince (1772–1781)
- Aloys I, Prince (1781–1805)

- Prince-Bishopric of Trent (complete list) –

- Johann Michael Graf von Spaur, Prince-bishop (1696–1725)
- Giovanni Benedetto Gentilotti, Prince-bishop (1725–1725)
- Anton Dominik Graf von Wolkenstein, Prince-bishop (1725–1730)
- Dominik Anton Graf von Thun, Prince-bishop (1730–1758)
- Leopold Ernst von Firmian, Administrator (1748–1758)
- Francesco Felice Alberti di Enno, Prince-bishop (1758–1762)
- Cristoforo Francesco Sizzo de Norris, Prince-bishop (1763–1776)
- Peter Michael Vigil Graf von Thun und Hohenstein, Prince-bishop (1776–1800)
- Emmanuel Maria Graf von Thun und Hohenstein, Prince-bishop (1800–1802), Prince (1802–1803)

== Bavarian ==
- Electorate of Bavaria (complete list) –

- Maximilian II Emanuel, Elector (1679–1726)
- Charles Albert, Elector (1726–1745)
- Maximilian III Joseph, Elector (1745–1777)
- Charles Theodore, Elector (1777–1799)
- Maximillian IV, Elector (1799–1805), King (1805–1825)

- Berchtesgaden Prince-Provostry (complete list) –

- Joseph Clemens of Bavaria, Prince-provost (1688–1723)
- Julius Heinrich von Rehlingen-Radau, Prince-provost (1723–1732)
- Cajetan Anton von Notthaft, Prince-provost (1732–1752)
- Michael Balthasar von Christalnigg, Prince-provost (1752–1768)
- Franz Anton Joseph von Hausen-Gleichenstorff, Prince-provost (1768–1780)
- Joseph Konrad von Schroffenberg-Mös, Prince-provost (1780–1803)

- Saint Emmeram's Abbey (complete list) –

- Anselm Godin de Tampezo, Prince-Abbot (1731–1742)
- Johann V Baptist Kraus, Prince-Abbot (1742–1762)
- Frobenius Forster, Prince-Abbot (1762–1791)
- Coelestin II Steiglehner, Prince-Abbot (1791–1803)

- Prince-Bishopric of Freising (complete list) –

- John Francis Eckher of Kapfing and Liechteneck, Prince-bishop (1694/95–1727)
- Johann Theodor of Bavaria, Prince-bishop (1727–1763)
- Clemens Wenceslaus, Prince-bishop (1763–1768)
- Louis Joseph of Welden, Prince-bishop (1768–1788)
- Maximilian Prokop of Toerring-Jettenbach, Prince-bishop (1788–1789)
- Joseph Conrad Freiherr, Prince-bishop (1790–1802)

- Prince-Abbey of Niedermünster (complete list) –

- Johanna Franziska Sibylla von Muggenthal, Abbess (1697–1723)
- Maria Katharina Helena von Aham-Neuhaus, Abbess (1723–1757)
- Anna Katharina von Dücker-Hasslen-Urstein-Winkel, Abbess (1757–1768)
- Anna Febronia Elisabeth von Speth-Zwyfalten, Abbess (1769–1789)
- Maria Franziska Xaveria von Königfeld, Abbess (1789–1793)
- Maria Violanta von Lerchenfeld-Premberg, Abbess (1793–1801)

- Prince-Abbey of Obermünster (complete list) –

- Maria Theresia von Sandizell, Abbess (1683–1719)
- Anna Magdalena Franziska von Dondorff, Abbess (1719–1765)
- Maria Franziska von Freudenberg, Abbess (1765–1775)
- Maria Josepha von Neuenstein-Hubacker, Abbess (1775–1803)

- Imperial County of Ortenburg (complete list) –

- George Philip, Count (1684–1702)
- John George, Count (1702–1725)
- Charles III, Count (1725–1776)
- Charles Albert, Count (1776–1787)
- Joseph Charles Leopold, Count (1787–1805)

- Palatinate-Birkenfeld-Gelnhausen –

- John Charles, Count (1654–1704)
- Frederick Bernard, Count (1704–1739)
- John, Count (1739–1780)
- Charles John Louis, Count (1780–1789)
- William, Count (1789–1799)

- Palatinate-Birkenfeld-Zweibrücken (complete list) –

- Christian III, Count Palatine (1731–1735)
- Christian IV, Count Palatine (1735–1775)
- Charles III, Count Palatine (1775–1795)
- Maximilian Joseph, Count Palatine (1795–1797)

- Palatinate-Sulzbach –

- Christian Augustus, Count (1632–1708)
- Theodore Eustace, Count (1708–1732)
- John Christian Joseph, Count (1732–1733)
- Charles Theodore, Count (1733–1742), Elector (1742–1799)

- Pappenheim (complete list) –

- Christian Ernest, co-Count (1697–1721)
- John Frederick, co-Count (1697–1731)
- Frederick Ernest, co-Count (1721–1725)
- Albert Louis Frederick, co-Count (1725–1733)
- Frederick Ferdinand, Count (1733–1773)
- John Frederick Ferdinand, Count (1773–1792)
- Frederick William, Regent (1792–1797)
- Charles Theodore Frederick Eugene Francis, Count (1792–1806)

- Prince-Bishopric of Passau (complete list) –

- John Philip of Lamberg, Prince-Bishop (1689–1712)
- Raymund Ferdinand, Count of Rabatta, Prince-Bishop (1713–1722)
- Joseph Dominic of Lamberg, Prince-Bishop (1723–1761)
- Joseph Maria, Count of Thun, Prince-Bishop (1761–1763)
- Leopold Ernst von Firmian, Prince-Bishop (1763–1783)
- Joseph Francis Anton of Auersperg, Prince-Bishop (1783–1795)
- Thomas John Caspar, Count of Thun-Hohenstein, Prince-Bishop (1795–1796)
- Leopold Leonard, Prince-Bishop (1796–1803)

- Prince-Bishopric of Regensburg (complete list) –

- Joseph Clemens of Bavaria, Prince-bishop (1685–1716)
- Clemens August I of Bavaria, Prince-bishop (1716–1719)
- Johann Theodor of Bavaria, Prince-bishop (1719–1763)
- Clemens Wenceslaus of Saxony, Prince-bishop (1763–1769)
- Anton Ignaz von Fugger-Glött, Prince-bishop (1769–1787)
- Maximilian Prokop von Toerring-Jettenbach, Prince-bishop (1787–1789)
- Joseph Konrad von Schroffenberg, Prince-bishop (1790–1803)

- Prince-Archbishopric of Salzburg (complete list) –

- Johann Ernst von Thun und Hohenstein, Prince-archbishop (1687–1709)
- Francis Anton od Harrach, Prince-archbishop (1709–1727)
- Leopold Anton von Firmian, Prince-archbishop (1727–1744)
- Jacob Ernest of Liechtenstein-Castelcorno, Prince-archbishop (1744–1747)
- Andreas Jacob of Dietrichstein, Prince-archbishop (1747–1753)
- Sigismund III of Schrattenbach, Prince-archbishop (1753–1771)
- Hieronymus von Colloredo, Prince-archbishop (1772–1803)

== Bohemian and Hungary ==
- Kingdom of Bohemia, Kingdom of Hungary (complete list, complete list) –

- Leopold I, King of Bohemia (1656–1705), of Hungary (1657–1705)
- Joseph I, King (1705–1711)
- Charles II, King (1711–1740)
- Maria Theresa, Queen of Bohemia (1740–1741, 1743–1780), of Hungary (1740–1780)
- Charles Albert, disputed King (1741–1743)
- Joseph II, King (1780–1790)
- Leopold II, King (1790–1792)
- Francis II, King (1792–1835)

- Duchy of Teschen (Cieszyn) (complete list) –

- Leopold, Duke (1722–1729)
- Francis I Stephen, Duke (1729–1765)
- Joseph II, Duke (1765–1766)
- Maria Christina, Duchess (1766–1797)
- Albert Casimir, Duke (1766–1822)

== Burgundian-Low Countries ==
- Duchy of Brabant (complete list) –

- Philip VI, Duke (1700–1706)
- Charles IV, Duke (1706–1740)
- Maria Theresa, Duchess (1740–1780)
- Joseph, Duke (1780–1789)
- Leopold, Duke (1790–1792)
- Francis I, Duke (1792–1794)

- County of Flanders (complete list) –

- Philip VII, Count (1700–1706)
- Charles V, Count (1714–1740)
- Maria Theresa, Countess (1740–1780)
- Francis I, Count (1740–1765)
- Joseph I, Count (1780–1790)
- Leopold, Count (1790–1792)
- Francis II, Count (1792–1795)

- Upper Guelders (complete list) –

- Philippe Emanuel, Stadtholder (1699–1702)

- County of Holland, Lordship of Utrecht, County of Zeeland (complete list) –

- William III, Stadtholder (1672–1702)
- Second Stadtholderless Period (1702–1747)

- Duchy of Limburg (complete list) –

- Philip VI, Duke (1700–1706)
- Charles IV, Duke (1706–1740)
- Maria Theresa, Duchess (1740–1780)
- Joseph, Duke (1780–1790)
- Leopold, Duke (1790–1792)
- Francis, Duke (1792–1794)

- Duchy of Luxemburg

- Limburg-Luxemburg dynasty (complete list) –

- Philip V, Duke (1700–1712)
- Maximilian II, Duke (1712–1713)
- Charles V, Duke (1713–1740)
- Mary II, Duchess (1740–1780)
- Joseph, Duke (1780–1790)
- Leopold, Duke (1790–1792)
- Francis, Duke (1792–1794)

- Stadtholders (complete list) –

- Franz-Paul von Wallis, Stadtholder (1727–1734)

- Namur (complete list) –

- War of the Spanish Succession (1706–1714)
- Charles IV, Margrave (1714–1740)
- Mary II Theresa, Margrave (1740–1780)
- Joseph I, Margrave (1780–1790)

== Franconian ==
- Prince-Bishopric of Bamberg (complete list) –

- Lothar Franz von Schönborn, Prince-bishop (1693–1729)
- Friedrich Karl von Schönborn, Prince-bishop (1729–1746)
- Johann Philipp Anton von Franckenstein, Prince-bishop (1746–1753)
- Franz Konrad von Stadion und Thannhausen, Prince-bishop (1753–1757)
- Adam Friedrich von Seinsheim, Prince-bishop (1757–1779)
- Franz Ludwig von Erthal, Prince-bishop (1779–1795)
- Christoph Franz von Buseck, Prince-bishop (1795–1802)

- County of Castell (complete list) –

- Louis Frederick, Count (1709–1772)
- Christian Adolph Frederick, Count of Castell-Remlingen (1743–1762)

inherited by Castell-Castell

- Prince-Bishopric of Eichstätt (complete list, de) –

- Johann Martin von Eyb, Prince-bishop (1697–1704)
- Johann Anton I Knebel von Katznellenbogen, Prince-bishop (1705–1725)
- Ludwig Franz Schenk von Castell, Prince-bishop (1725–1736)
- Johann Anton II von Freinerg-Hopferau, Prince-bishop (1736–1757)
- Raymund Anton von Strasoldo, Prince-bishop (1757–1781)
- Johann Anton III von Zehmen, Prince-bishop (1781–1790)
- Joseph Graf von Stubenberg, Prince-bishop (1790–1802)

- Hohenlohe-Bartenstein (complete list) –

- Philipp Karl, Count (1688–1729)
- Karl Philipp, Count (1729–1744), Prince (1744–1763)
- Ludwig Carl Franz Leopold, Prince (1763–1798)
- Louis Aloysius, Prince (1799–1806)

- Hohenlohe-Ingelfingen (complete list) –

- Christian Kraft, Count (1701–1743)
- Philipp Heinrich, Count (1743–1764), Prince (1764–1781)
- Heinrich August (Hohenlohe-Ingelfingen-Öhringen), Prince (1781–1796)
- Frederick Louis, Prince (1796–1806)
- Adolf Karl Friedrich Ludwig, Prince (1806)

- Hohenlohe-Jagstberg (complete list) –

- Karl Joseph, Prince (1798–1806)

- Hohenlohe-Kirchberg (complete list) –

- Frederick Eberhard, Count of Hohenlohe-Kirchberg (1701–1737)
- Charles Augustus, Count (1737–1764), Prince (1764–1767)
- Christian Friedrich Karl zu Hohenlohe-Kirchberg, Prince (1767–1806)

- Hohenlohe-Langenburg (complete list) –

- Christian Kraft, Count (1699–1701)
- Frederick Eberhard, Count (1699–1701)
- Albert Wolfgang, Count (1699–1715)
- Ludwig, Count (1715–1764), Prince (1764–1765)
- Christian Albrecht, Prince (1765–1789)
- Karl Ludwig, Prince (1789–1806)

- Hohenlohe-Oehringen –

- Johann Friedrich, co-Count of Hohenlohe-Neuenstein (1645–1677), Count of Hohenlohe-Oehringen (1677–1702)
- Karl Ludwig, co-Count of Hohenlohe-Oehringen (1702–1708), Count of Hohenlohe-Weikersheim (1708–1756)
- Johann Friedrich II, co-Count (1702–1708), Count (1708–1764), Prince (1764–1765)
- Ludwig Friedrich Karl (Hohenlohe-Neuenstein-Öhringen), Prince (1765–1805)

- Hohenlohe-Waldenburg-Pfedelbach –

- Ludwig Gottfried of Hohenlohe-Waldenburg-Pfedelbach (1685–1728)

- Schönborn (complete list) –

- John Erwin, Baron (1668–1701), Count (1701–1705)
- Melchior Friedrich, Count (1705–1717)

divided between the lines Heusenstamm and Wiesentheid.

- Schönborn-Heusenstamm (complete list) –

- Anselm Francis, Count (1717–1726)
- Anselm Posthumous, Count (1726–1801)

- Schönborn-Wiesentheid (complete list) –

- Rudolf Franz Erwein, Count (1717–1754)
- Joseph Francis Bonaventura, Count (1754–1772)
- Damian Hugo Erwin, Count (1772–1806)

- Hohenlohe-Waldenburg-Schillingsfürst (complete list) –

- Philipp Ernst zu Hohenlohe-Waldenburg-Schillingsfürst, Count (1697–1744), Prince (1744–1750)
- Karl Albrecht I. zu Hohenlohe-Waldenburg-Schillingsfürst, Prince (1759–1793)
- Charles Albert II, Prince (1793–1796)
- Charles Albert III, Prince (1796–1806)

- Prince-Bishopric of Würzburg (complete list) –

- Johann Philipp von Greifenclau zu Vollraths, Prince-bishop (1699–1719)
- Johann Philipp Franz von Schönborn, Prince-bishop (1719–1725)
- Christoph Franz von Hutten, Prince-bishop (1724–1729)
- Friedrich Karl von Schönborn, Prince-bishop (1729–1746)
- Anselm Franz von Ingelheim, Prince-bishop (1746–1749)
- Karl Philipp von Greifenclau zu Vollraths, Prince-bishop (1749–1754)
- Adam Friedrich von Seinsheim, Prince-bishop (1755–1779)
- Franz Ludwig von Erthal, Prince-bishop (1779–1795)
- Georg Karl Ignaz von Fechenbach zu Laudenbach, Prince-bishop (1795–1803)

== Electoral Rhenish ==
- Arenberg (complete list) –

- Leopold, Duke (1691–1754)
- Charles Marie Raymond, Duke (1754–1778)
- Louis Engelbert, Duke (1778–1803)

- Elector-Archbishopric of Cologne (complete list) –

- Joseph Clemens of Bavaria, Archbishop-elector (1688–1723)
- Clemens August of Bavaria, Archbishop-elector (1723–1761)
- Maximilian Frederick of Königsegg-Rothenfels, Archbishop-elector (1761–1784)
- Maximilian Franz of Austria, Archbishop-elector (1784–1801)

- Elector-Bishopric of Mainz (complete list) –

- Lothar Franz von Schönborn, Archbishop-elector (1695–1729)
- Francis Louis of Palatinate-Neuburg, Archbishop-elector (1729–1732)
- Philipp Karl von Eltz-Kempenich, Archbishop-elector (1732–1743)
- Johann Friedrich Karl von Ostein, Archbishop-elector (1743–1763)
- Emmerich Joseph von Breidbach zu Bürresheim, Archbishop-elector (1763–1774)
- Friedrich Karl Joseph von Erthal, Archbishop-elector (1774–1802)

- Electoral Palatinate (complete list) –

Palatinate-Birkenfeld-Gelnhausen
Palatinate-Kleeburg
Palatinate-Sulzbach
Palatinate-Zweibrücken
Palatinate-Zweibrücken-Birkenfeld

- John Charles, Count Palatine of Birkenfeld-Gelnhausen (1654–1704)
- Christian II, Count Palatine of Zweibrücken-Birkenfeld (1671–1717)
- Adolph John II, Count Palatine of Kleeburg (1689–1701)
- John William, Elector (1690–1716)
- Charles IV, Count Palatine of Zweibrücken (1697–1718)
- Gustavus, Count Palatine of Kleeburg (1701–1718)
- Gustavus, Count Palatine of Zweibrücken (1718–1731)
- Frederick Bernard, Count Palatine of Birkenfeld-Gelnhausen (1704–1739)
- Theodore Eustace, Count Palatine of Sulzbach (1708–1732)
- Charles Philip, Elector (1716–1742)
- Christian III, Count Palatine of Zweibrücken-Birkenfeld (1717–1731)
- Christian III, Count Palatine of Zweibrücken (1731–1735)
- John Christian, Count Palatine of Sulzbach (1732–1733)
- Christian IV, Count Palatine of Zweibrücken (1735–1775)
- John VI, Count Palatine of Birkenfeld-Gelnhausen (1739–1780)
- Charles Theodore, Count Palatine of Sulzbach (1733–1742)
- Charles Theodore, Elector of Palatinate (1742–1777)
- Charles Theodore, Elector of Bavaria (1777–1799)
- Charles August, Count Palatine of Zweibrücken (1775–1795)
- Charles John, Count Palatine of Birkenfeld-Gelnhausen (1780–1789)
- William, Count Palatine of Birkenfeld-Gelnhausen (1789–1799)
- Maximilian I Joseph, Count of Palatine Zweibrücken (1795–1799), Elector of Palatinate and of Bavaria (1799–1803)

- Thurn und Taxis (complete list) –

- Eugen Alexander, Count (1676–1695), Prince (1695–1714)
- Anselm Franz, Prince (1714–1739)
- Alexander Ferdinand, Prince (1739–1773)
- Karl Anselm, Prince (1773–1805)

- Elector-Bishopric of Trier (complete list) –

- Johann Hugo von Orsbeck, Archbishop-elector (1676–1711)
- Charles Joseph of Lorraine, Archbishop-elector (1711–1715)
- Franz Ludwig of Palatinate-Neuburg, Archbishop-elector (1716–1729)
- Franz Georg von Schönborn-Buchheim, Archbishop-elector (1729–1756)
- Johann Philipp von Walderdorf, Archbishop-elector (1756–1768)
- Prince Clemens Wenceslaus of Saxony, Archbishop-elector (1768–1801)

== Lower Rhenish–Westphalian ==
- Bentheim-Bentheim (complete list) –

- Arnold Maurice, Count (1668–1701)
- Herman Frederick, Count (1701–1723)
- Louis Francis, Count (1723–1731)
- Frederick Charles, Count (1731–1803)

- Bentheim-Steinfurt (complete list) –

- Ernest, Count (1693–1713)
- Charles Frederick, Count (1713–1733)
- Charles Paul Ernest, Count (1733–1780)
- Louis, Count (1780–1803)

- Bentheim-Tecklenburg-Rheda (complete list) –

- John Adolph, Count (1674–1701/04)
- Friedrich Moritz, Count (1701/04–1710)
- Moritz Kasimir I, Count (1710–1768)
- Moritz Kasimir II, Count (1768–1805)

- Princely Abbey of Corvey (de:complete list) –

- Florenz von dem Felde, Prince-abbot (1696–1714)
- Maximilian von Horrich, Prince-abbot (1714–1721)
- Karl von Plittersdorf, Prince-abbot (1722–1737)
- Caspar II von Böselager-Honeburg, Prince-abbot (1737–1758)
- Philipp von Spiegel zum Desenberg, Prince-abbot (1758–1776)
- Johann Karl Theodor von Brabeck, Prince-abbot (1776–1792)
- Johann Karl Theodor von Brabeck, Prince-bishop (1792–1794)
- Ferdinand von Lüninck, Prince-bishop (1794–1802)

- Essen Abbey (complete list) –

- Bernhardine Sophia of East Frisia and Rietberg, Princess-Abbess (1691–1726)
- Francisca Christina, Princess-Abbess (1726–1776)
- Maria Kunigunde of Saxony, Princess-Abbess (1776–1802)

- County of East Frisia (complete list) –

- Christian Everhard, Prince (1690–1708)
- George Albert, Prince (1708–1734)
- Charles Edzard, Prince (1734–1744)

- Herford Abbey (complete list) –

- Charlotte Sophia, Abbess (1688–1728)
- Johanna Charlotte, Abbess (1729–1750)
- Sophia, Abbess (1750–1764)
- Princess Christine Charlotte of Hesse-Kassel, coadjutor Abbess (1766–1779)
- Frederica Charlotte, Abbess (1764–1802)

- Prince-Bishopric of Liège (complete list) –

- Joseph Clemens of Bavaria, Prince-Bishop (1694–1723)
- Georges-Louis de Berghes, Prince-Bishop (1724–1743)
- Jean-Théodore of Bavaria, Prince-Bishop (1744–1763)
- Charles-Nicolas d'Oultremont, Prince-Bishop (1763–1771)
- François-Charles de Velbruck, Prince-Bishop (1772–1784)
- César-Constantin-François de Hoensbroeck, Prince-Bishop (1784–1792)
- François-Antoine-Marie de Méan, Prince-Bishop (1792–1794)

- Limburg-Styrum-Borkelö (complete list) –

- Albert Dominic, Count (1766–1776)
- Otto Ernest Gelder, Count (1776–1806)

- Limburg-Styrum-Bronchhorst (complete list) –

- Frederick Theodore Ernest, Count (1766–1806)

- Limburg-Styrum-Bronchhorst-Borkelö (complete list) –

- Frederick William, Count (1679–1724)
- Leopold, Count (1724–1728)
- Otto Ernest Gelder, Count (1724–1766)

- Limburg-Styrum-Gemen (complete list) –

- Herman Otto II, Count (1657–1704)
- Otto Leopold Ernest, Count (1704–1754)
- Frederick Karl, Count (1754–1771)
- August Philip, Count (1771–1782)

- Limburg-Styrum-Iller-Aichheim (complete list) –

- Maximilian William, Count (1657–1724)
- Leopold, Count (1724–1726)
- Charles Alois Joseph, Count (1726–1739)
- Karl Josef, Count (1739–1798)
- Ferdinand I, Count (1798–1800)

- Limburg-Styrum-Styrum (complete list) –

- Moritz Hermann, Count (1664–1703)
- Christian Otto, Count (1703–1749)
- Karl Joseph August von Limburg-Styrum, Count (1749–1760)
- Philipp Ferdinand, Count (1760–1794)
- Ernst Maria von Limburg-Styrum, Countess (1794–1806)

- County/ Principality of Lippe (complete list) –

- Friedrich Adolf, Count (1697–1718)
- Simon Heinrich Adolf, Count (1718–1734)
- Simon August, Count (1734–1782)
- Leopold I, Count (1782–1789), Prince (1789–1802)

- Lippe-Biesterfeld (complete list) –

- Friedrich Charles, Count (1762–1781)
- Karl, Count (1781–1810)

- Prince-Bishopric of Münster (complete list) –

- Frederick Christian of Plettenberg, Prince-bishop (1688–1706)
- Francis Arnold von Wolff-Metternich zur Gracht, Prince-bishop (1706–1718)
- Clemens August I, Prince-bishop (1719–1761)
- Maximilian Frederick of Königsegg-Rothenfels, Prince-bishop (1761–1784)
- Maximilian Franz, Prince-bishop (1784–1801)

- County/ Duchy of Oldenburg (complete list) –

- Frederick II, Count (1699–1730)
- Christian IX, Count (1730–1746)
- Frederick III, Count (1746–1766)
- Christian X, Count (1766–1773)
- Paul I, Count (1773)
- Frederick Augustus I, Count (1773), Duke (1774–1785)
- Wilhelm I, Duke (1785–1810), Grand Duke (1815–1823)

- Principality of Orange-Nassau –

- John William Friso, Prince (1702–1711)
- William IV (1711–1751)
- William V (1751–1806)

- Principality of Orange-Nassau (complete list) –

- John William Friso, Prince (1702–1711)
- William IV, Prince (1711–1751)
- William V, Prince (1751–1806)

- Prince-Bishopric of Osnabrück (complete list) –

- Charles Joseph of Lorraine, Prince-bishop (1698–1715)
- Ernest Augustus of York and Albany, Prince-bishop (1715–1728)
- Clemens August of Bavaria, Prince-bishop (1728–1761)
- Frederick of York and Albany, Prince-bishop (1764–1802)

- Prince-Bishopric of Paderborn (complete list) –

- Hermann Werner von Wolff-Metternich zur Gracht, Prince-bishop (1683–1704)
- Franz Arnold von Wolff-Metternich zur Gracht, Prince-bishop (1704–1718)
- Clemens August of Bavaria, Prince-bishop (1719–1761)
- William Anton of Asseburg, Prince-bishop (1763–1782)
- Frederick William of Westphalia, Prince-bishop (1782–1789)
- Franz Egon von Fürstenberg, Prince-bishop (1789–1825)

- Wied-Dierdorf (complete list) –

- Louis Frederick, Count (1664–1709)

- Wied-Neuwied (complete list) –

- Frederick William, Count (1698–1737)
- John Frederick Alexander, Count (1737–1784), Prince (1784–1791)
- Frederick Charles, Prince (1791–1802)

- Wied-Runkel (complete list) –

- Maximilian Heinrich, Count (1692–1706)
- Johann Ludwig Adolph, Count (1706–1762)
- Christian Ludwig, Count (1762–1791), Prince (1791)
- Karl Ludwig Friedrich Alexander, Prince (1791–1806)

== Upper Rhenish ==
- Prince-Bishopric of Basel (complete list) –

- Wilhelm Jakob Rink von Baldenstein, Prince-bishop (1693–1705)
- Johann Konrad von Reinach-Hirtzbach, Prince-bishop (1705–1737)
- Jakob Sigismund von Reinach-Steinbrunn, Prince-bishop (1737–1743)
- Josef Wilhelm Rinck von Baldenstein, Prince-bishop (1744–1762)
- Simon Nikolaus Euseb von Montjoye-Hirsingen, Prince-bishop (1762–1775)
- Friedrich Ludwig Franz von Wangen zu Geroldseck, Prince-bishop (1775–1782)
- Franz Joseph Sigismund von Roggenbach, Prince-bishop (1782–1794)
- Franz Xaver von Neveu, Prince-bishop (1794–1828)

- Free City of Frankfurt

- Senior Mayors (de:complete list) –

- Heinrich von Barckhausen, Senior Mayor (1700–1701)
- Johann Adolph Stephan von Cronstetten II, Senior Mayor (1701–1702)
- Dominicus Heyden, Senior Mayor (1702–1703)
- Nicolaus August Ruland, Senior Mayor (1703–1704)
- Johann Arnold Mohr von Mohrenhelm, Senior Mayor (1704–1705)
- Johann Adolph von Glauburg I, Senior Mayor (1705–1706)
- Heinrich von Barckhausen, Senior Mayor (1706–1707)
- Johann Adolph Stephan von Cronstetten II, Senior Mayor (1707–1708)
- Dominicus Heyden, Senior Mayor (1708–1709)
- Philipp Jacob Fleckhammer von Aystetten, Senior Mayor (1709–1710)
- Johann Georg von Holzhausen, Senior Mayor (1710–1711)
- Johann Philipp Orth, Senior Mayor (1711–1712)
- Johann Adolph von Glauburg I, Senior Mayor (1712–1713)
- Heinrich von Barckhausen, Senior Mayor (1713–1714)
- Johann Georg von Holzhausen, Senior Mayor (1714–1715)
- Johann Philipp Orth II, Senior Mayor (1715–1716)
- Johann Martin von den Birgden, Senior Mayor (1716–1717)
- Johann Heinrich Werlin, Senior Mayor (1717–1718)
- Johann Philipp von Kellner I, Senior Mayor (1718–1719)
- Konrad Hieronymus Eberhard gen. Schwind, Senior Mayor (1719–1720)
- Ludwig Adolph von Syvertes, Senior Mayor (1720–1721)
- Johann Christoph von Stetten, Senior Mayor (1721–1722)
- Bartholomäus von Barckhausen, Senior Mayor (1722–1723)
- Georg Friedrich Faust von Aschaffenburg, Senior Mayor (1723–1724)
- Johann Hieronymus von Glauburg, Senior Mayor (1724–1725)
- Johann Christoph Ochs von Ochsenstein, Senior Mayor (1725–1726)
- Johann Adolph von Glauburg II, Acting Mayor (1726)
- Konrad Hieronymus Eberhard gen. Schwind, Senior Mayor (1726–1727)
- Achilles Augustus von Lersner, Senior Mayor (1727–1728)
- Johann Daniel Fleischbein von Kleeberg, Senior Mayor (1728)
- Johann Adolph von Glauburg III, Acting Mayor (1728)
- Achilles Augustus von Lersner, Senior Mayor (1728–1729)
- Johann Christoph Ochs von Ochsenstein, Senior Mayor (1729–1730)
- Achilles Augustus von Lersner, Senior Mayor (1730–1731)
- Johann Carl von Kaib, Senior Mayor (1731–1732)
- Johann Jacob von Bertram, Senior Mayor (1732–1733)
- Johann Hieronymus von Holzhausen, Senior Mayor (1733–1734)
- Johann Jacob von Bertram, Senior Mayor (1734–1735)
- Johann Philipp von Syvertes, Senior Mayor (1735–1736)
- Johann Carl von Kaib, Senior Mayor (1736–1737)
- Johann Philipp von Kellner II, Senior Mayor (1737–1738)
- Johann Wolfgang Textor, Senior Mayor (1738–1739)
- Johann Carl von Kaib, Senior Mayor (1739–1740)
- Johann Philipp von Syvertes, Senior Mayor (1740–1741)
- Johann Christoph Ochs von Ochsenstein, Senior Mayor (1741)
- Remigius Seyffart von Klettenberg, Acting Mayor (1741)
- Johann Wolfgang Textor, Senior Mayor (1741–1742)
- Johann Carl von Kaib, Senior Mayor (1742–1743)
- Johann Wolfgang Textor, Senior Mayor (1743–1744)
- Johann Georg Schweitzer Edler von Wiederhold, Senior Mayor (1744–1745)
- Johann Carl von Fichard, Senior Mayor (1745–1746)
- Friedrich Maximilian von Günderrode, Senior Mayor (1746–1747)
- Friedrich Maximilian von Lersner, Senior Mayor (1747–1748)
- Johann Georg Schweitzer Edler von Wiederhold, Senior Mayor (1748–1749)
- Friedrich Maximilian von Günderrode, Senior Mayor (1749–1750)
- Johann Carl von Fichard, Senior Mayor (1750–1751)
- Friedrich Maximilian von Lersner, Senior Mayor (1751–1752)
- Johann Georg Schweitzer Edler von Wiederhold, Senior Mayor (1752–1753)
- Johann Carl von Fichard, Senior Mayor (1753–1754)
- Remigius Seyffart von Klettenberg, Senior Mayor (1754–1755)
- Johann Carl von Fichard, Senior Mayor (1755–1756)
- Friedrich Wilhelm von Völcker, Senior Mayor (1756–1757)
- Erasmus Schlösser, Senior Mayor (1757–1758)
- Philipp Jacob von Stallburg, Senior Mayor (1758–1759)
- Remigius Seyffart von Klettenberg, Senior Mayor (1759–1760)
- Johann Carl von Fichard, Senior Mayor (1760–1761)
- Johann Maximilian von Holzhausen, Senior Mayor (1761–1762)
- Johann Friedrich Armand von Uffenbach, Senior Mayor (1762–1763)
- Johann Isaac Moors, Senior Mayor (1763–1764)
- Erasmus Schlösser, Senior Mayor (1764–1765)
- Hieronymus Maximilian von Glauburg, Senior Mayor (1765–1766)
- Johann Carl von Fichard, Senior Mayor (1766–1767)
- Friedrich Maximilian Baur von Eysseneck, Senior Mayor (1767–1768)
- Johann Philipp von Heyden, Senior Mayor (1768–1769)
- Johann Isaac Moors, Senior Mayor (1769–1770)
- Hieronymus Maximilian von Glauburg, Senior Mayor (1770–1771)
- Johann Daniel von Olenschlager, Senior Mayor (1771–1772)
- Johann Philipp von Heyden, Senior Mayor (1772–1773)
- Hieronymus Maximilian von Glauburg, Senior Mayor (1773–1774)
- Friedrich Adolph von Glauburg, Senior Mayor (1774–1775)
- Johann Philipp von Heyden, Senior Mayor (1775–1776)
- Hieronymus Maximilian von Glauburg, Senior Mayor (1776–1777)
- Johann Friedrich von Wiesenhütten, Senior Mayor (1777–1778)
- Friedrich Adolph von Glauburg, Senior Mayor (1779–1780)
- Johann Daniel Fleischbein von Kleeberg II, Senior Mayor (1780–1781)
- Johann Friedrich von Wiesenhütten, Senior Mayor (1781–1782)
- Friedrich Adolph von Glauburg, Senior Mayor (1782–1783)
- Johann Christoph von Adlerflycht, Senior Mayor (1783–1784)
- Johann Friedrich von Wiesenhütten, Senior Mayor (1784–1785)
- Johann Christoph von Adlerflycht, Senior Mayor (1785–1786)
- Friedrich Adolph von Glauburg, Senior Mayor (1786–1787)
- Johann Friedrich Maximilian von Stallburg, Senior Mayor (1787–1788)
- Friedrich Adolph von Glauburg, Senior Mayor (1788–1789)
- Friedrich Maximilian von Lersner II, Senior Mayor (1789–1790)
- Johann Christoph von Lauterbach, Senior Mayor (1790–1791)
- Adolph Carl von Humbracht, Senior Mayor (1791–1792)
- Johann Christoph von Lauterbach, Senior Mayor (1792–1793)
- Johann Nicolaus Olenschlager (1751–1820), Senior Mayor (1793–1794)
- Adolph Carl von Humbracht, Senior Mayor (1794–1795)
- Johann Nicolaus Olenschlager von Olenstein, Senior Mayor (1795–1796)
- Johann Christoph von Lauterbach, Senior Mayor (1796–1797)
- Adolph Carl von Humbracht, Senior Mayor (1797–1798)
- Friedrich Maximilian von Lersner II, Senior Mayor (1798–1799)
- Adolph Carl von Humbracht, Senior Mayor (1799–1800)
- Anton Ulrich von Holzhausen, Senior Mayor (1800–1801)

- Stadtschultheißens (de:complete list) –

- Johann Erasmus Seyffart von Klettenberg und Rhoda, Stadtschultheißen (1696–1716)
- Johann Georg von Holzhausen, Stadtschultheißen (1716–1721)
- Johann Heinrich Werlin, Stadtschultheißen (1721–1741)
- Johann Christoph Ochs von Ochsenstein, Stadtschultheißen (1741–1747)
- Johann Wolfgang Textor Stadtschultheißen (1747–1771)
- Johann Isaac Moors, Stadtschultheißen (1771–1777)
- Johann Martin Ruppel, Stadtschultheißen (1777–1788)
- Johann Friedrich Maximilian von Stalburg, Stadtschultheißen (1788–1802)
- Wilhelm Carl Ludwig Moors, Stadtschultheißen (1788–1806)

- Princely Abbey of Fulda (complete list) –

- Adalbert I. von Schleifras, Prince-abbot (1700–1714)
- Konstantin von Buttlar, Prince-abbot (1714–1726)
- Adolphus von Dalberg, Prince-abbot (1726–1737)
- Amand von Buseck, Prince-abbot (1737–1752), Prince-bishop (1752–1756)
- Adalbert II. von Walderdorff, Prince-bishop (1757–1759)
- Heinrich von Bibra, Prince-bishop (1759–1788)
- Adalbert von Harstall, Prince-bishop (1789–1802)

- Hesse-Darmstadt (complete list) –

- Ernest Louis, Landgrave (1678–1739)
- Louis VIII, Landgrave (1739–1768)
- Louis IX, Landgrave (1768–1790)
- Louis X, Landgrave of Hesse-Darmstadt (1790–1806), Grand Duke of Hesse (1806–1830)

- Hesse-Homburg (complete list) –

- Frederick II, Landgrave (1679–1708)
- Frederick III Jacob, Landgrave (1708–1746)
- Frederick IV Charles, Landgrave (1746–1751)
- Ulrike Louise of Solms-Braunfels, Regent (1751–1766)
- Frederick V, Landgrave (1751–1820)

- Hesse-Kassel (complete list) –

- Charles I, Landgrave (1670–1730)
- Frederick V, Landgrave (1730–1751)
- William XI, Landgrave (1751–1760)
- Frederick VIII, Landgrave (1760–1785)
- William XIII, Landgrave of Hesse-Kassel (1785–1803), Elector of Hesse (1803–1807, 1813–1821)

- Hesse-Philippsthal (complete list) –

- Philip, Landgrave (1663–1721)
- Charles I, Landgrave (1721–1770)
- William, Landgrave (1770–1806)

- Hesse-Philippsthal-Barchfeld (complete list) –

- William, Landgrave (1721–1761)
- Frederick, Landgrave (1761–1777)
- Adolph, Landgrave (1777–1803)

- Hesse-Rotenburg (complete list) –

- William the Elder, Landgrave (1693–1725)
- Ernest Leopold, Landgrave (1725–1749)
- Constantine, Landgrave of Hesse-Rotenburg (1749–1778), Landgrave of Hesse-Wanfried-Rheinfels (1755–1778)
- Charles Emmanuel, Landgrave (1778–1812)

- Hesse-Wanfried-Rheinfels (complete list) –

- Charles, Landgrave (1676–1711)
- William II the Younger, Landgrave (1711–1731)
- Christian, Landgrave (1731–1755)
- Constantine, Landgrave of Hesse-Rotenburg (1749–1778), Landgrave of Hesse-Wanfried-Rheinfels (1755–1778)

- Isenburg-Birstein (complete list) –

- Wolfgang Ernest I, Count (1711–1744), Prince (1744–1754)
- Wolfgang Ernest II, Prince (1754–1803)

- Isenburg-Büdingen (complete list) –

- Johann Ernst II. von Isenburg und Büdingen, Count (1693–1708)
- Ernst Casimir I. von Isenburg-Büdingen, Count (1708–1749)
- Gustav Friedrich von Isenburg und Büdingen, Count (1749–1768)
- Ludwig Casimir von Isenburg und Büdingen, Count (1768–1775)
- Ernst Casimir II. von Isenburg und Büdingen, Count (1775–1801)

- Isenburg-Büdingen-Birstein (complete list) –

- Wilhelm Moritz I, Count (1685–1711)
- Wolfgang Ernest I, Prince (1711–1754)
- Wolfgang Ernest II, Prince (1754–1803)

- Isenburg-Offenbach (complete list) –

- John Philip, Count (1685–1711)
- Christian Henry, Count (1685–1711)

- Isenburg-Meerholz (complete list) –

- George Albert, Count (1691–1724)
- Charles Frederick, Count (1724–1774)
- John Frederick William, Count (1774–1802)

- Isenburg-Philippseich (complete list) –

- William Maurice II, Count (1711–1772)
- Christian Charles, Count (1772–1779)
- Charles William, Count (1779–1781)
- Henry Ferdinand, Count (1779–1806)

- Isenburg-Wächtersbach –

- Ferdinand Maximilian I, Count (1673–1703)
- Ferdinand Maximilian II, Count (1703–1755)
- Ferdinand Casimir I, Count (1755–1778)
- Ferdinand Casimir II, Count (1778–1780)
- Albert Augustus, Count (1780–1782)
- William Reinhard, Count (1782–1785)
- Adolph, Count (1785–1798)
- Louis Maximilian I, Count (1798–1805)

- Westerburg-Leiningen-Leiningen (complete list: de) –

- Philipp Ludwig, Count of Leiningen-Leiningen (1668–1705)

- Leiningen-Dagsburg-Falkenburg –

- Christian Karl Reinhard, Count (1698–1766)
- Maria Louise Albertine, Countess (1766–c.1803)

- Leiningen-Schaumburg (de:complete list) –

- George Friedrich, Count (1698–1708)

- Leiningen-Westerburg-Altleiningen (de:complete list) –

- Christopher Christian, Count (1695–1728)
- George Hermann, Count (1728–1751)
- Christian Johann, Count (1751–1770)
- Christian Karl, Count (1770–1806)

- Leiningen-Westerburg-Neuleiningen (de:complete list) –

- George II Karl Ludwig, Count (1695–1726)
- George Karl I August Ludwig, Count (1726–1787)
- Karl II Gustav Reinhard Waldemar, Count (1787–1798)
- Ferdinand Karl III, Count (1798–1806)

- Leiningen-Hardenburg (de:complete list) –

- Johann Friedrich, Count (1684–1722)
- Friedrich Magnus, Count (1722–1756)
- Carl Friedrich Wilhelm, Count (1756–1779), Prince (1779–1807)

- Principality of Leiningen (de:complete list) –

- Carl Friedrich Wilhelm, Count (1756–1779), Prince (1779–1807)

- Duchy of Lorraine (complete list) –

- Leopold, Duke (1690–1729)
- Francis III, Duke (1729–1737)
- Stanisław I, Duke (1737–1766)

- Nassau-Saarbrücken (complete list) –

- Louis Crato, Count (1677–1713)
- Charles Louis, Count (1713–1723)
- Frederick Louis, Count (1723–1728)
- Charles, Count (1728–1735)
- William Henry II, Count (1735/42–1768)
- Louis, Count (1768–1794)
- Henry, Count (1794–1797)

- Nassau-Usingen (complete list) –

- Walrad, Count (1659–1688), Prince (1688–1702)
- William Henry, Prince (1702–1718)
- Charles, Prince (1718–1775)
- Charles William, Prince (1775–1803)

- Nassau-Weilburg (complete list) –

- John Ernst, Count (1675–1688), Princely count (1688–1719)
- Charles August, Princely count (1719–1753)
- Charles Christian, Princely count (1753–1788)
- Frederick William, Princely count (1788–1816)

- Salm-Dhaun (complete list) –

- Charles, Rhinegrave (1693–1733)
- John Philip III, Rhinegrave (1733–1742)
- Christian Otto, Rhinegrave (1742–1748)

- Salm-Hoogstraten (complete list) –

- William Florentin, Rhinegrave (1696–1707)
- Nicolas Leopold I, Prince (1707–1770)

- Salm-Kyrburg (complete list) –

- Philipp Joseph of Salm-Leuze, Rhinegrave (1716–1743), Prince (1743–1779)
- Frederick III, Prince (1779–1794)
- Frederick IV, Prince (1794–1813)

- Salm-Leuze (complete list) –

- Henry Gabriel, Rhinegrave (1696–1716)
- Philipp Joseph of Salm-Leuze, Rhinegrave (1716–1743), Prince (1743–1779)

- Salm-Püttlingen (complete list) –

- Vollrath Victor, Rhinegrave (1697–1730)
- John, Rhinegrave (1730–1750)
- Frederick William, Rhinegrave (?–1748)
- John Frederick, Rhinegrave (1748–1750)
- Charles Leopold Louis, Rhinegrave (1750)
- Frederick William, Rhinegrave (1750)

- Salm-Reifferscheid-Bedburg (complete list) –

- Francis William, Altgrave (1673–1734)
- Charles Anthony, Altgrave (1734–1755)
- Sigismund, Altgrave (1755–1798)
- Francis William, Altgrave (1798–1804), Prince (1804–1806)

- Salm-Reifferscheid-Dyck (complete list) –

- Francis Ernest, Count (1684–1727)
- Augustus Eugene Bernard, Count (1727–1767)
- William, Count (1767–1775)
- Joseph, Count (1775–1806)

- Salm-Reifferscheid-Hainsbach (complete list) –

- Leopold Anthony, Altgrave (1734–1769)
- Francis Wenceslaus, Altgrave (1769–1811)

- Salm-Reifferscheid-Krautheim (complete list) –

- Francis William, Altgrave (1798–1804), Prince (1804–1806)

- Salm-Reifferscheid-Raitz (complete list) –

- Anthony, Altgrave (1734–1769)
- Charles Joseph, Altgrave (1769–1790), Prince (1790–1811)

- Salm-Salm (complete list) –

- Charles Theodore, Prince of Salm, Count of Salm-Salm (1663–1710)
- Ludwig Otto, Prince of Salm, Count of Salm-Salm (1710–1736)
- Nikolaus Leopold, Prince (1739–1770)
- Ludwig Karl Otto, Prince (1770–1778)
- Konstantin Alexander, Prince (1778–1813)

- Sayn-Wittgenstein-Berleburg (complete list) –

- Casimir, Count (1694–1741)
- Ludwig Ferdinand, Count (1741–1773)
- Christian Heinrich, Count (1773–1792), Prince (1792–1800)
- Albrecht, Prince (1800–1806)

- Sayn-Wittgenstein-Hohenstein (complete list) –

- Friedrich II, Count (1796–1801), Prince (1801–1806)

- Prince-Bishopric of Sion (complete list) –

- Adrien V of Riedmatten, Prince-Bishop (1672–1701)
- François-Joseph Supersaxo, Prince-Bishop (1701–1734)
- Jean-Joseph-Arnold Blatter, Prince-Bishop (1734–1752)
- Jean-Hildebrand Roten, Prince-Bishop (1752–1760)
- François-Joseph-Frédéric Ambuel, Prince-Bishop (1760–1780)
- François-Melchior-Joseph Zen-Ruffinen, Prince-Bishop (1780–1790)
- Joseph Anton Blatter, Prince-Bishop (1790–1807)

- Solms-Braunfels (complete list) –

- Wilhelm Moritz, Count (1693–1720)
- Friedrich William, Count (1720–1742), Prince (1742–1761)
- Ferdinand Wilhelm Ernst, Prince (1761–1783)
- Wilhelm Christian Karl, Prince (1783–1806)

- Prince-Bishopric of Speyer (complete list) –

- Johann Hugo von Orsbeck, Prince-bishop (1675–1711)
- Heinrich Hartard of Rollingen, Prince-bishop (1711–1719)
- Hugo Damian of Schönborn, Prince-bishop (1719–1743)
- Franz Christoph of Hutten zu Stolzenberg, Prince-bishop (1743–1770)
- Damian August Philipp Karl, Count of Limburg-Stirum-Vehlen, Prince-bishop (1770–1797)

- Prince-Bishopric of Strasbourg (complete list) –

- Wilhelm Egon von Fürstenberg, Prince-Bishop (1682–1704)
- Armand Gaston Maximilien de Rohan, Prince-Bishop (1704–1749)
- François-Armand-Auguste de Rohan-Soubise-Ventadour, Prince-Bishop (1749–1756)
- Louis César Constantin, prince de Rohan-Guéméné, Prince-Bishop (1756–1779)
- Louis René Édouard de Rohan-Guéméné, Prince-Bishop (1779–1801)

- County of Waldeck and Pyrmont –

- Christian Louis, Count of Waldeck-Wildungen (1645–1692), of Waldeck and Pyrmont (1692–1706)
- Friedrich Anton Ulrich, Count (1706–1712), Prince (1712–1728)

- Principality of Waldeck and Pyrmont (complete list) –

- Friedrich Anton Ulrich, Count (1706–1712), Prince (1712–1728)
- Karl August, Prince (1728–1763)
- Friedrich Karl August, Prince (1763–1812)

- Prince-Bishopric of Worms (complete list) –

- Count Palatine Francis Louis of Neuburg, Prince-bishop (1694–1732)
- Franz Georg von Schönborn, Prince-bishop (1732–1756)
- Johann Friedrich Karl von Ostein, Prince-bishop (1756–1763)
- Johann Philipp II von Walderdorf, Prince-bishop (1763–1768)
- Emmerich Joseph von Breidbach zu Bürresheim, Prince-bishop (1768–1774)
- Friedrich Karl Josef von Erthal, Prince-bishop (1774–1802)

== Lower Saxon ==
- Electorate of Saxony, Albertine (complete list) –

- Augustus II the Strong, Elector (1694–1733), Regent of Saxe-Merseburg (1694–1712)
- Frederick Augustus II, Elector (1733–1763)
- Frederick Christian, Elector (1763)
- Maria Antonia of Bavaria, Regent (1763–c.1768)
- Frederick Augustus the Just, Elector (1763–1806), King (1806–1827)

- Saxe-Lauenburg (complete list) –

- George William, occupying Duke (1689–1705)

title then held successively by the monarchs of Britain, Denmark, and Prussia

- Saxe-Zeitz (complete list) –

- Moritz Wilhelm, Duke (1681–1718)

- Saxe-Zeitz-Pegau-Neustadt (complete list) –

- Frederick Henry, Duke of Saxe-Zeitz-Pegau-Neustadt, Duke (1699–1713)

inherited by the Electorate of Saxony

- Saxe-Weissenfels (complete list) –

- Johann Georg, Duke (1697–1712)
- Christian, Duke (1712–1736)
- Johann Adolf II, Duke (1736–1746)

inherited by the Electorate of Saxony

- Saxe-Merseburg (complete list) –

- Augustus II the Strong, Elector (1694–1733), Regent of Saxe-Merseburg (1694–1712)
- Erdmuthe Dorothea of Saxe-Zeitz, Regent (1694–1712)
- Maurice William, Duke (1694–1731)
- Heinrich, Duke (1731–1738)

inherited by the Electorate of Saxony

- Bremen-Verden (complete list) –

- Charles XII, Duke (1697–1718)
- Ulrika Eleonora, Duchess (1718–1719)
- George I, Duke (1715–1727)
- George II, Duke (1727–1760)
- George III, Duke (1760–1807, 1813–1820)

- Principality of Brunswick-Wolfenbüttel/ Principality of Wolfenbüttel (complete list) –

- Rudolf Augustus, Prince (1666–1704)
- Anthony Ulrich, Prince (1685–1702, 1704–1714)
- Augustus William, Prince (1714–1731)
- Louis Rudolph, Prince (1731–1735)
- Ferdinand Albert II, Prince of Bevern (1687–1735), of Brunswick-Wolfenbüttel (1735)
- Charles I, Prince (1735–1780)
- Charles William Ferdinand, Prince (1780–1806)

- Gandersheim Abbey (complete list) –

- Henriette Christine, Princess-Abbess (1693–1712)
- Marie Elisabeth zu Mecklenburg, Princess-Abbess (1712–1713)
- Elisabeth Ernestine Antonie, (1713–1766)
- Therese Natalie, Princess-Abbess (1767–1778)
- Augusta Dorothea, Princess-Abbess (1778–1810)

- Free City of Hamburg (complete list) –

- Peter Lütkens, Mayor (1687–1717)
- Peter von Lengerke (or Lengerks), Mayor (1697–1709)
- Julius Surland, Mayor (1702)
- Gerhard Schröder, Mayor (1703)
- Paul Paulsen, Mayor (1704)
- Lucas von Borstel, Mayor (1709–1716)
- Ludwig Becceler, Mayor (1712)
- Bernhard Matfeld, Mayor (1716–1720)
- Garlieb Sillem, Mayor (1717)
- Hinrich Diedrich Wiese, Mayor (1720–1728)
- Hans Jacob Faber, Mayor (1722)
- Johann Anderson, Mayor (1723)
- Rütger Rulant, Mayor (1728–1742)
- Daniel Stockfleth, Mayor (1729)
- Martin Lucas Schele, Mayor (1733)
- Johann H. Luis, Mayor (1739)
- Cornelius Poppe, Mayor (1741)
- Conrad Widow, Mayor (1742–1754)
- Nicolaus Stempeel, Mayor (1743)
- Clemens Samuel Lipstrop, Mayor (1749)
- Lucas von Spreckelsen, Mayor (1750)
- Martin H. Schele, Mayor (1751)
- Lucas Corthum, Mayor (1751)
- Nicolaus Schuback, Mayor (1759)
- Peter Greve, Mayor (1759)
- Vincent Rumpff, Mayor (1765)
- Johann Schlüter, Mayor (1774)
- Albert Schule, Mayor (1778)
- Frans Doormann, Mayor (1780)
- Jacob Albrecht von Sienen, Mayor (1781)
- Johann Anderson, Mayor (1781)
- Johann Luis, Mayor (1784)
- Johann Adolph Poppe, Mayor (1786)
- Martin Dorner, Mayor (1788)
- Franz Anton Wagener, Mayor (1790–1801)
- Daniel Lienau, Mayor (1798)
- Peter Hinrich Widow, Mayor (1800–1802)

- Electorate of Hanover (Brunswick-Lüneburg) (complete list) –

- George I, Elector-designate (1698–1708), Elector (1708–1727)
- George II, Elector (1727–1760)
- George III, Elector (1760–1806), King (1814–1820)

- Prince-Bishopric of Hildesheim (complete list) –

- Jobst Edmund von Brabeck, Prince-bishop (1688–1702)
- Joseph Clemens of Bavaria, Prince-bishop (1702–1723)
- Clemens August of Bavaria, Prince-bishop (1723–1761)
- Friedrich Wilhelm von Westphalen, Prince-bishop (1763–1789)
- Franz Egon von Fürstenberg, Prince-bishop (1789–1803)

- Holstein-Glückstadt

- Dukes (complete list) –

- Frederick IV, Duke (1699–1730)
- Christian VI, Duke (1730–1746)
- Frederick V, Duke (1746–1766)
- Christian VII, Duke of Holstein-Glückstadt (1766–1773), of Holstein (1773–1808)

- Statholders (complete list) –

- Friedrich von Ahlefeldt, Statholder (1697–1708)
- Carl von Ahlefeldt, Count of Langeland (1708–1722), Statholder (1708–1722)
- Charles Augustus of Brandenburg-Kulmbach, Statholder (1730–1731)
- Frederick Ernest of Brandenburg-Kulmbach, Statholder (1731–1762)
- Friedrich Ludwig von Ahlefeldt-Dehn, Statholder (1762–1768)
- Charles of Hesse-Kassel, Statholder (1768–1836)

- Duchy of Holstein

- Dukes (complete list) –

- Christian VII, Duke of Holstein-Glückstadt (1766–1773), of Holstein (1773–1808)

- Statholders (complete list) –

- Charles of Hesse-Kassel, Statholder (1768–1836)

- Holstein-Gottorp (complete list) –

- Frederick IV, Duke (1694–1702)
- Charles Frederick, Duke (1702–1739)
- Karl Peter Ulrich, Duke (1739–1762)
- Paul, Duke (1762–1773)

- Prince-bishopric of Lübeck (complete list) –

- August Frederick of Holstein-Gottorp, Prince-bishop (1666–1705)
- Christian August of Holstein-Gottorp, Prince-bishop (1705–1726)
- Charles August of Holstein-Gottorp, Prince-bishop (1726–1727)
- Adolf Friedrich (1727–1750)
- Frederick August I, Prince-bishop (1750–1785)
- Peter Frederick Louis, Prince-bishop (1785–1803)

- Free City of Lübeck (complete list) –

- Anton Winckler, Mayor (1694–1707)
- Hieronymus von Dorne, Mayor (1695–1704)
- Gotthard Kerkring, Mayor (1697–1705)
- Johann Westken, Mayor (1703)
- Thomas von Wickede (1646–1716), Mayor (1708)
- Sebastian Gercken, Mayor (1706)
- Adolf Mattheus Rodde, Mayor (1708)
- Peter Hinrich Tesdorpf (Kaufmann, 1648), Mayor (1715)
- Daniel Müller (Bürgermeister), Mayor (1717)
- Hermann Rodde, Mayor (1717)
- Joachim Lothar Carstens, Mayor (1722)
- Jakob Hübens, Mayor (1731)
- Heinrich Balemann, Mayor (1724)
- Heinrich von Brömbsen, Mayor (1728)
- Anton von Lüneburg, Mayor (1732)
- Christian Albrecht Niemann, Mayor (1731)
- August Simon Lindholtz, Mayor (1735)
- Johann Heinrich Dreyer, Mayor (1732)
- Hermann Münter (Bürgermeister), Mayor (1738)
- Gotthard Arnold Isselhorst, Mayor (1744)
- Johann Adolph Krohn, Mayor (1744)
- Heinrich Rust, Mayor (1743)
- Mattheus Rodde, Mayor (1757)
- Johann Friedrich Carstens, Mayor (1750)
- Andreas Albrecht von Brömbsen, Mayor (1750)
- Ludwig Philipp Roeck, Mayor (1761)
- Daniel Haecks, Mayor (1757)
- Friedrich Green, Mayor (1769)
- Heinrich Diedrich Balemann, Mayor (1761)
- Georg Wilhelm Detharding, Mayor (1765)
- Joachim Peters, Mayor (1773)
- Bernhard von Wickede, Mayor (1773)
- Franz Bernhard Rodde, Mayor (1789)
- Joachim Matthias Lütkens, Mayor (1777)
- Hermann Georg Bünekau, Mayor (1778)
- Johann Arnold Isselhorst, Mayor (1781)
- Joachim Tanck, Mayor (1783)
- Heinrich Brockes II., Mayor (1768)
- Anton Diedrich Wilken, Mayor (1790)
- Georg Blohm, Mayor (1792)
- Hermann Diedrich Krohn, Mayor (1786)
- Gabriel Christian Lembke, Mayor (1794)
- Johann Georg Böhme, Mayor (1799)
- Christian von Brömbsen, Mayor (1800)

- Principality of Lüneburg (complete list) –

- George William, Prince of Calenberg (1648–1665), of Lüneburg (1658–1705)

inherited by the Electorate of Hanover (Brunswick-Lüneburg)

- Mecklenburg (complete list) –

- Frederick William I, Duke of Mecklenburg-Schwerin (1692–1695, 1701–1713), Duke of Mecklenburg (1695–1701)

- Duchy of Mecklenburg-Schwerin (complete list) –

- Frederick William I, Duke of Mecklenburg-Schwerin (1692–1695, 1701–1713), Duke of Mecklenburg (1695–1701)
- Charles Leopold I, Duke (1713–1728)
- Christian Louis II, Duke (1728–1756)
- Frederick II the Pious, Duke (1756–1785)
- Frederick Francis I, Duke (1785–1815), Grand Duke (1815–1837)

- Duchy of Mecklenburg-Strelitz (complete list) –

- Adolphus Frederick II, Duke (1701–1708)
- Adolphus Frederick III, Duke (1708–1752)
- Adolphus Frederick IV, Duke (1752–1794)
- Charles II, Duke (1794–1815), Grand Duke (1815–1816)

- County/ Duchy of Oldenburg (complete list) –

- Frederick II, Count (1699–1730)
- Christian IX, Count (1730–1746)
- Frederick III, Count (1746–1766)
- Christian X, Count (1766–1773)
- Paul I, Count (1773)
- Frederick Augustus I, Count (1773–1774), Duke (1774–1785)
- Wilhelm, Duke (1784/85–1810, 1813–1815), Grand Duke (1815–1823)
- Peter I, Regent (1785–1823), Grand Duke (1823–1829)

- County of Rantzau –

- Christian Detlev of Rantzau, Count (1697–1721)
- Wilhelm Adolf of Rantzau, Count (1721–1726)

== Upper Saxon ==
- Anhalt-Bernburg (complete list) –

- Victor Amadeus, Prince (1656–1718)
- Karl Frederick, Prince (1718–1721)
- Victor Frederick, Prince (1721–1765)
- Frederick Albert, Prince (1765–1796)
- Alexius Frederick Christian, Prince (1796–1807), Duke (1807–1834)

- Anhalt-Zeitz-Hoym/ Anhalt-Bernburg-Schaumburg-Hoym (complete list) –

- Lebrecht, Prince (1718–1727)
- Victor I, Prince (1727–1772)
- Karl Louis, Prince (1772–1806)

- Anhalt-Dessau (complete list) –

- Leopold I, Prince (1693–1747)
- Leopold II Maximilian, Prince (1747–1751)
- Dietrich of Anhalt-Dessau, Regent (1751–1758)
- Leopold III, Prince (1751–1758), Duke (1758–1817), Regent of Anhalt-Köthen (1812–1817)

- Anhalt-Dornburg (complete list) –

- John Louis I, Prince (1667–1704)
- John Louis II, co-Prince (1704–1742)
- John Augustus, co-Prince (1704–1709)
- Christian Louis, co-Prince (1704–1710)
- John Frederick, co-Prince (1704–1742)
- Christian August, co-Prince of Anhalt-Dornburg (1704–1747), of Anhalt-Zerbst (1742–1747)

united with Anhalt-Zerbst

- Anhalt-Köthen (complete list) –

- Emmanuel Lebrecht, Prince (1671–1704)
- Gisela Agnes of Rath, Regent (1704–1715)
- Leopold, Prince (1704–1728)
- Augustus Louis, Prince (1728–1755)
- Charles George Lebrecht, Prince (1755–1789)
- Augustus Christian Frederick, Prince (1789–1806), Duke (1806–1812)

- Anhalt-Zerbst (complete list) –

- Charles, Prince (1667–1718)
- John Augustus, Prince (1718–1742)
- John Louis II, co-Prince (1742–1746)
- Christian August, co-Prince of Anhalt-Dornburg (1704–1747), of Anhalt-Zerbst (1742–1747)
- Joanna Elisabeth of Holstein-Gottorp, Regent (1747–1752)
- Frederick August, Prince (1747–1793)

divided among Anhalt-Bernburg, Anhalt-Dessau, and Anhalt-Köthen

- Electorate of Brandenburg, Duchy/ Kingdom of Prussia (complete list, complete list) –

- Frederick I, Elector (1688–1713), Duke (1688–1701), King (1701–1713)
- Frederick William I, Elector, King (1713–1740)
- Frederick II the Great, Elector, King (1740–1786)
- Frederick William II, Elector, King (1786–1797)
- Frederick William III, Elector (1797–1806), King (1797–1840)

- Brandenburg-Ansbach (complete list) –

- George Frederick II, Margrave (1692–1703)
- William Frederick, Margrave (1703–1723)
- Charles William Frederick, Margrave (1723–1757)
- Charles Alexander, Margrave (1757–1791)

- Brandenburg-Bayreuth (formally Brandenburg-Kulmbach) (complete list) –

- Christian Ernst, Margrave (1655–1712)
- George William, Margrave (1712–1726)
- George Frederick Charles, Margrave (1726–1735)
- Frederick, Margrave (1735–1763)
- Frederick Christian, Margrave (1763–1769)
- Charles Alexander, Margrave (1769–1791)

- Reuss-Ebersdorf (complete list) –

- Heinrich X, Count (1678–1711)
- Heinrich XXIX, Count (1711–1747)
- Heinrich XXIV, Count (1747–1779)
- Heinrich LI, Count (1779–1806), Prince (1806–1822)

- Reuss-Greiz (complete list) –

- Heinrich XI, Prince (1778–1800)
- Heinrich XIII, Prince (1800–1817)

- Reuss-Lobenstein (complete list) –

- Heinrich III, Lord (1671–1673), Count (1673–1710)
- Heinrich XV, Count (1710–1739)
- Heinrich II, Count (1739–1782)
- Heinrich XXXV, Count (1782–1790), Prince (1790–1805)

- Reuss-Schleiz (complete list) –

- Heinrich I, Count (1673–1692)
- Heinrich XI, Count (1692–1726)
- Heinrich I, Count (1726–1744)
- Heinrich XII, Count (1744–1784)
- Heinrich XLII, Count (1784–1806), Prince (1806–1818)

- Saxe-Eisenberg (complete list) –

- Christian, co-Duke of Saxe-Gotha-Altenburg (1675–1680), Duke of Saxe-Eisenberg (1680–1707)

inherited by Saxe-Hildburghausen

- Saxe-Römhild (complete list) –

- Henry, co-Duke of Saxe-Gotha-Altenburg (1675–1680), Duke of Saxe-Römhild (1680–1710)

divided in dispute

- Saxe-Eisenach (complete list) –

- John William III, Duke (1698–1729)
- Wilhelm Heinrich, Duke (1729–1741)

inherited by Saxe-Weimar to form Saxe-Weimar-Eisenach

- Saxe-Coburg-Saalfeld (complete list) –

- John Ernest IV, co-Duke of Saxe-Gotha-Altenburg (1675–1680), Duke of Saxe-Saalfeld (1680–1699), of Saxe-Coburg-Saalfeld (1699–1729)
- Christian Ernest II, Duke (1729–1745)
- Francis Josias, Duke of Saxe-Coburg-Saalfeld (1745–1764), co-Regent of Saxe-Weimar-Eisenach (1748–1755)
- Ernest Frederick, Duke (1764–1800)
- Francis, Duke (1800–1806)

- Saxe-Gotha-Altenburg (complete list) –

- Frederick II, Duke (1691–1732)
- Frederick III, Duke of Saxe-Gotha-Altenburg (1732–1772), co-Regent of Saxe-Weimar-Eisenach (1748–1755))
- Ernest II, Duke (1772–1804)

- Saxe-Hildburghausen (complete list) –

- Ernest, co-Duke of Saxe-Gotha-Altenburg (1675–1680), Duke of Saxe-Hildburghausen (1680–1715)
- Ernest Frederick I, Duke (1715–1724)
- Sophia Albertine of Erbach-Erbach, Regent (1724–1728)
- Ernest Frederick II, Duke (1724–1745)
- Caroline of Erbach-Fürstenau, Regent (1745–1748)
- Ernest Frederick III, Duke (1745–1780)
- Joseph Frederick, Regent (1780–1787)
- Frederick, Duke of Saxe-Hildburghausen (1780–1826), of Saxe-Altenburg (1826–1834)

- Saxe-Meiningen (complete list) –

- Bernhard I, co-Duke of Saxe-Gotha-Altenburg (1675–1680), Duke of Saxe-Meiningen (1680–1706)
- Ernst Ludwig I, Duke (1706–1724)
- Ernst Ludwig II, Duke (1724–1729)
- Friedrich II of Saxe-Gotha, co-Regent (1729–1733)
- Karl Friedrich, Duke (1729–1743)
- Friedrich Wilhelm, co-Regent (1729–1733), co-Duke (1743–1746)
- Anthony Ulrich, Duke (1746–1763)
- Charlotte Amalie of Hesse-Philippsthal, Regent (1763–1779)
- Karl Wilhelm, Duke (1763–1782)
- Georg I, Duke (1782–1803)

- Saxe-Weimar (complete list) –

- William Ernest, Duke of Saxe-Weimar (1683–1728), Regent of Saxe-Jena (1686–1690)
- Ernest Augustus I, Duke of Saxe-Weimar (1707–1741), of Saxe-Weimar-Eisenach (1741–1748)

- Saxe-Weimar-Eisenach (complete list) –

- Ernest Augustus I, Duke of Saxe-Weimar (1707–1741), of Saxe-Weimar-Eisenach (1741–1748)
- Frederick III, Duke of Saxe-Gotha-Altenburg (1732–1772), co-Regent of Saxe-Weimar-Eisenach (1748–1755)
- Francis Josias, Duke of Saxe-Coburg-Saalfeld (1745–1764), co-Regent of Saxe-Weimar-Eisenach (1748–1755)
- Ernest Augustus II, Duke (1748–1758)
- Anna Amalia of Brunswick-Wolfenbüttel, Regent (1758–1775)
- Karl August, Duke (1758–1815), Grand Duke (1815–1828)

- Schwarzburg-Rudolstadt (complete list) –

- Albert Anton, Count (1646–1710)
- Louis Frederick I, Prince (1710–1718)
- Frederick Anton, Prince (1718–1744)
- John Frederick, Prince (1744–1767)
- Louis Günther II, Prince (1767–1790)
- Frederick Charles, Prince (1790–1793)
- Louis Frederick II, Prince (1793–1807)

- Schwarzburg-Sondershausen (complete list) –

- Anton Günther II, co-Count (1666–1697), co-Prince (1697–1716)
- Christian William, co-Count (1666–1697), co-Prince (1697–1721)
- Günther XLIII, Prince (1721–1740)
- Henry XXXV, Prince (1740–1758)
- Christian Günther III, Prince (1758–1794)
- Günther Friedrich Carl I, Prince (1794–1835)

- County of Stolberg (de:complete list) –

- Christoph Ludwig I, Count (1634–1704)

- Stolberg-Rossla (de:complete list) –

- Jost Christian, Count (1706–1739)
- Friedrich Botho zu Stolberg-Roßla, Count (1739–1768)
- Heinrich Friedrich Christian zu Stolberg-Roßla, Count (1768–1806)

- Stolberg-Stolberg (de:complete list) –

- Christoph Friedrich zu Stolberg-Stolberg, Count (1706–1738)
- Christian Günther zu Stolberg-Stolberg, Count (1738–1765)
- Karl Ludwig zu Stolberg-Stolberg, Count (1765–1806)

- Stolberg-Wernigerode (complete list) –

- Ernest, Count (1672–1710)
- Christian Ernest, Count (1710–1771)
- Henry Ernest, Count (1771–1778)
- Christian Frederick, Count (1778–1807)

== Swabian ==
- Prince-Bishopric of Augsburg (complete list) –

- Alexander Sigismund von der Pfalz-Neuburg, Prince-bishop (1690–1737)
- Johann Franz Schenk von Stauffenberg, Prince-bishop (1737–1740)
- Joseph Ignaz Philipp von Hessen-Darmstadt, Prince-bishop (1740–1768)
- Clemens Wenceslaus of Saxony, Prince-bishop (1768–1803)

- Margraviate of Baden-Baden (complete list) –

- Louis William the Turkish, Margrave (1677–1707)
- Sibylle of Saxe-Lauenburg, Regent (1707–1727)
- Louis George the Hunter, Margrave (1707–1761)
- August George, Margrave (1761–1771)

then inherited by Charles Frederick to unite Baden

- Margraviate of Baden-Durlach/ Margraviate of Baden (complete list) –

- Frederick VII Magnus, Margrave (1677–1709)
- Charles III William, Margrave (1709–1738)
- Magdalena Wilhelmine of Württemberg, Regent (1738–1742)
- Charles August of Baden-Durlach, Regent (1738–1746)
- Charles Frederick, Margrave of Baden-Durlach (1746–1771), of Baden (1771–1803), Elector (1803–1806), Grand Duke (1806–1811)

- Prince-Bishopric of Constance (complete list) –

- Marquard Rudolf von Rodt, Prince-bishop (1689–1704)
- Johann Franz Schenk von Stauffenberg, Prince-bishop (1704–1740)
- Hugo Damian von Schönborn, Prince-bishop (1740–1743)
- Kasimir Anton von Sickingen, Prince-bishop (1743–1750)
- Franz Konrad von Rodt, Prince-bishop (1750–1775)
- Maximilian Christof von Rodt, Prince-bishop (1775–1799)
- Karl Theodor Anton Maria von Dalberg, Prince-bishop (1799–1803)

- Prince-Provostry of Ellwangen (complete list) –

- Francis Louis, Prince-provost (1694–1732)
- Franz Georg von Schönborn, Prince-provost (1732–1756)
- Anton Ignaz of Fugger-Glött, Prince-provost (1756–1787)
- Clemens Wenceslaus, Prince-provost (1787–1803)

- Gutenzell Abbey (de:complete list) –

- Maria Victoria Hochwind, Princess-abbess (1696–1718)
- Maria Bernarda von Donnersberg, Princess-abbess (1718–1747)
- Maria Franziska von Gall, Princess-abbess (1747–1759)
- Maria Alexandra Zimmermann, Princess-abbess (1759–1776)
- Maria Justina von Erolzheim, Princess-abbess (1776–1803)

- Hohenzollern-Hechingen (complete list) –

- Friedrich Wilhelm, Prince (1671–1735)
- Friedrich Ludwig, Prince (1735–1750)
- Josef Friedrich Wilhelm, Prince (1750–1798)
- Hermann, Prince (1798–1810)

- Hohenzollern-Sigmaringen (complete list) –

- Meinrad II, Prince (1689–1715)
- Joseph Friedrich Ernst, Prince (1715–1769)
- Karl Friedrich, Prince (1769–1785)
- Anton Aloys, Prince (1785–1831)

- Princely Abbey of Kempten (complete list) –

- Rupert von Bodman, Prince-abbot (1678–1728)
- Anselm Reichlin von Meldegg, Prince-abbot (1728–1747)
- Engelbert von Syrgenstein, Prince-abbot (1747–1760)
- Honorius Roth von Schreckenstein, Prince-abbot (1760–1785)
- Rupert II von Neuenstein, Prince-abbot (1785–1793)
- Castolus Reichlin von Meldegg, Prince-abbot (1793–1803)

- Königsegg-Aulendorf (complete list) –

- Francis Maximilian, Count (1692–1710)
- Charles Siegfried, Count (1710–1765)
- Herman Frederick, Count (1765–1786)
- Ernest, Count (1786–1803)

- Königsegg-Rothenfels (complete list) –

- Sigmund William, Count (1694–1709)
- Albert, Count (1709–1736)
- Charles Ferdinand, Count (1736–1759)
- Francis Hugh, Count (1759–1771)
- Francis Fidelis Anthony, Count (1771–1804)

- Lindau Abbey (de:complete list) –

- Maria Magdalena von Hallwyl, Princess-abbess (1689–1720)
- Maria Franzisca Hundbiss von Waltrams, Princess-abbess (1720–1730)
- Maria Anna Margaretha von Gemmingen, Princess-abbess (1730–1743)
- Therese Wilhelmine von Pollheim-Winkelhausen, Princess-abbess (1743–1757)
- Maria Anna Margaretha von Gemmingen, Princess-abbess (1757–1771)
- Maria Josepha Agatha von Ulm-Langenrhein, Princess-abbess (1771–1781)
- Friederike von Bretzenheim, Princess-abbess (1782–1796)
- Maria Anna Franziska Susanna Clara Ferdinanda von Ulm-Langenrhein, Princess-abbess (1797–1800)

- Principality of Mindelheim (complete list) –

- John Churchill Prince (1705–1714)

- Oettingen-Wallerstein (complete list) –

- Wolfgang IV, Count (1692–1708)
- Franz Ignaz, Count (1708–1728)
- Anton Karl, Count (1728–1738)
- Johann Karl Friedrich, Count (1738–1744)
- Maximilian Ignaz Philipp, Count (1744–1745)
- Philipp Karl, Count (1745–1766)
- Kraft Ernst, Count (1766–1774), Prince (1774–1802)

- Stadion (complete list) –

- John Philip, Lord (1666–1686), Baron (1686–1705), Count (1705–1741)

- Stadion-Thannhausen (complete list) –

- Hugo Philip, Count (1741–1785)
- John George Joseph Nepomuk, Count (1785–1806)

- Stadion-Warthausen (complete list) –

- Anthony Henry Frederick, Count (1741–1768)
- Francis Conrad, Count (1768–1787)
- Johann Philipp, Count (1787–1806)

- Weingarten Abbey (complete list) –

- Sebastian Hyller, Prince-abbot (1697–1730)
- Alfons II Jobst, Prince-abbot (1730–1738)
- Placidus Renz, Prince-abbot (1738–1745)
- Domenicus II Schnitzer, Prince-abbot (1746–1784)
- Anselm Ritter, Prince-abbot (1784–1803)

- Duchy of Württemberg (complete list) –

- Eberhard Louis, Duke of Württemberg, Duke (1677–1733)
- Charles Alexander, Duke of Württemberg, Duke (1733–1737)
- Frederick Achilles, Duke of Württemberg-Neuenstadt, Duke (1617–1631)
- Frederick, Duke of Württemberg-Neuenstadt, Duke (1649–1682)
- Frederick Charles, Duke of Württemberg-Winnental, Duke (1677–1698)
- Frederick Augustus, Duke of Württemberg-Neuenstadt, Duke (1682–1716)
- Carl Rudolf, Duke of Württemberg-Neuenstadt, Duke (1716–1742)
- Charles Eugene, Duke of Württemberg, Duke (1737–1793)
- Louis Eugene, Duke of Württemberg, Duke (1793–1795 )
- Frederick II Eugene, Duke of Württemberg, Duke (1795–1797)
- Frederick I, Duke (1797–1803), Elector (1803–1805), King (1805–1816)

== Italy ==
Holy Roman Empire in Italy

- Republic of Genoa (complete list) –

- Girolamo De Mari, Doge (1699–1701)
- Federico De Franchi Toso, Doge (1701–1703)
- Antonio Grimaldi, Doge (1703–1705)
- Stefano Onorato Ferretti, Doge (1705–1707)
- Domenico Maria De Mari, Doge (1707–1709)
- Vincenzo Durazzo, Doge (1709–1711)
- Francesco Maria Imperiale, Doge (1711–1713)
- Giovanni Antonio Giustiniani, Doge (1713–1715)
- Lorenzo Centurione, Doge (1715–1717)
- Benedetto Viale, Doge (1717–1719)
- Ambrogio Imperiale, Doge (1719–1721)
- Cesare De Franchi Toso, Doge (1721–1723)
- Domenico Negrone, Doge (1723–1725)
- Gerolamo Veneroso, Doge (1726–1728)
- Luca Grimaldi, Doge (1728–1730)
- Francesco Maria Balbi, Doge (1730–1732)
- Domenico Maria Spinola, Doge (1732–1734)
- Stefano Durazzo, Doge (1734–1736)
- Nicolò Cattaneo Della Volta, Doge (1736–1738)
- Costantino Balbi, Doge (1738–1740)
- Nicolò Spinola, Doge (1740–1742)
- Domenico Canevaro, Doge (1742–1744)
- Lorenzo De Mari, Doge (1744–1746)
- Giovanni Francesco II Brignole Sale, Doge (1746–1748)
- Cesare Cattaneo Della Volta, Doge (1748–1750)
- Agostino Viale, Doge (1750–1752)
- Stefano Lomellini, Doge (1752)
- Giovanni Battista Grimaldi, Doge (1752–1754)
- Gian Giacomo Veneroso, Doge (1754–1756)
- Giovanni Giacomo Grimaldi, Doge (1756–1758)
- Matteo Franzoni, Doge (1758–1760)
- Agostino Lomellini, Doge (1760–1762)
- Rodolfo Emilio Brignole Sale, Doge (1762–1764)
- Francesco Maria Della Rovere, Doge (1765–1767)
- Marcello Durazzo, Doge (1767–1769)
- Giovanni Battista Negrone, Doge (1769–1771)
- Giovanni Battista Cambiaso, Doge (1771–1773)
- Ferdinando Spinola, Doge (1773–1775)
- Pier Francesco Grimaldi, Doge (1775–1777)
- Brizio Giustiniani, Doge (1777–1779)
- Giuseppe Lomellini, Doge (1779–1781)
- Giacomo Maria Brignole, Doge (1781–1783)
- Marco Antonio Gentile, Doge (1783–1785)
- Giovanni Battista Ayroli, Doge (1785–1787)
- Gian Carlo Pallavicino, Doge (1787–1789)
- Raffaele Agostino De Ferrari, Doge (1789–1791)
- Alerame Maria Pallavicini, Doge (1791–1793)
- Michelangelo Cambiaso, Doge (1793–1795)
- Giuseppe Maria Doria, Doge (1795–1797)

- Duchy of Milan (complete list) –

- Philip IV, Duke (1700–1714)
- Charles II, Duke (1714–1740)
- Maria Theresa, Duchess (1740–1780)
- Joseph I, Duke (1780–1790)
- Leopold I, Duke (1790–1792)
- Francis III, Duke (1792–1796)

- Duchy of Modena (complete list) –

- Rinaldo, Duke (1695–1737)
- Francesco III, Duke (1737–1780)
- Ercole III, Duke (1780–1796)

- Principality of Orange (complete list) –

- William III, Prince (1650–1702)

- Papal States (complete list) –

- Innocent XII, Pope (1691–1700)
- Clement XI, Pope (1700–1721)
- Innocent XIII, Pope (1721–1724)
- Benedict XIII, Pope (1724–1730)
- Clement XII, Pope (1730–1740)
- Benedict XIV, Pope (1740–1758)
- Clement XIII, Pope (1758–1769)
- Clement XIV, Pope (1769–1774)
- Pius VI, Pope (1775–1799)
- Pius VII, Pope (1800–1823)

- Duchy of Savoy (complete list) –

- Victor Amadeus II, Duke (1675–1730)
- Charles Emmanuel III, Duke (1730–1773)
- Victor Amadeus III, Duke (1773–1792)

- Kingdom of Sardinia (complete list) –

- Victor Amadeus II, King (1720–1730)
- Charles Emmanuel III, King (1730–1773)
- Victor Amadeus III, King (1773–1796)
- Charles Emmanuel IV, King (1796–1802)

== Bibliography ==
- Phillips, Walter Alison; Atkinson, Charles Francis (1911). "Hohenlohe" . In Chisholm, Hugh (ed.). Encyclopædia Britannica. Vol. 13 (11th ed.). Cambridge University Press. pp. 572–575.
