= Paolo da Novi =

42nd Doge of the Republic of Genoa (1440–1507)

42nd Doge of the Republic of Genoa
- In office 10 April 1507 – 27 April 1507
- Preceded by: Dogeship vacant
- Succeeded by: Dogeship vacant

Personal details
- Born: 1440 Novi Ligure, Republic of Genoa
- Died: 10 July 1507 (aged 66–67) Genoa, Republic of Genoa

Paolo da Novi (Novi Ligure, 1440 – Genoa, 10 July 1507) was the 42nd Doge of the Republic of Genoa.

== Biography ==
A native of Novi Ligure, he moved to Genoa with his family where he worked as a silk dyer. At the end of the fifteenth century he was appointed to the Office of the Authority, which was followed by his appointment as captain for the defense of the Riviere.

In his short Dogate, which lasted 17 days, as a wise and prudent man, he tried to promote reforms in favor of the people and peaceful coexistence. And to restore the state coffers he also took out a mortgage with Bank of Saint George.

== See also ==
- Doge of Genoa
- Republic of Genoa
