= Domenico Maria De Mari =

Doge of the Republic of Genoa and king of Corsica

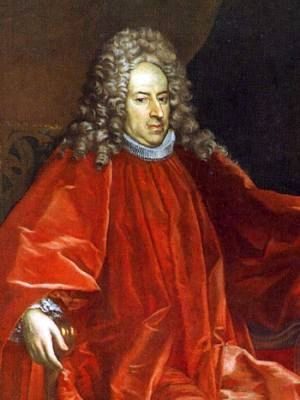

139th Doge of the Republic of Genoa
- In office September 9, 1707 – September 9, 1709
- Preceded by: Stefano Onorato Ferretti
- Succeeded by: Vincenzo Durazzo

Personal details
- Born: 1653 Genoa, Republic of Genoa
- Died: 1726 (aged 72–73) Genoa, Republic of Genoa

Domenico Maria De Mari (Genoa, 1653 - Genoa, 1726) was the 139th Doge of the Republic of Genoa and king of Corsica.

== Biography ==
Son of Stefano De Mari, and Livia Maria Lercari, he was born in Genoa in 1653. On 9 September 1707 Domenico Maria De Mari was elected by the members of the Grand Council the new Doge of the Republic of Genoa with 374 votes out of 596, the ninety-fourth in biennial succession and the one hundred and thirty-ninth in republican history. On November 12 he was solemnly crowned in the Genoa Cathedral in the presence of the Bishop of Savona Vincenzo Maria Durazzo. As doge he was also invested with the related biennial office of king of Corsica. Domenico Maria De Mari died in 1726.

== See also ==
- Republic of Genoa
- Doge of Genoa
