= Doge of Genoa =

Ruler of the Republic of Genoa

- Coat of arms

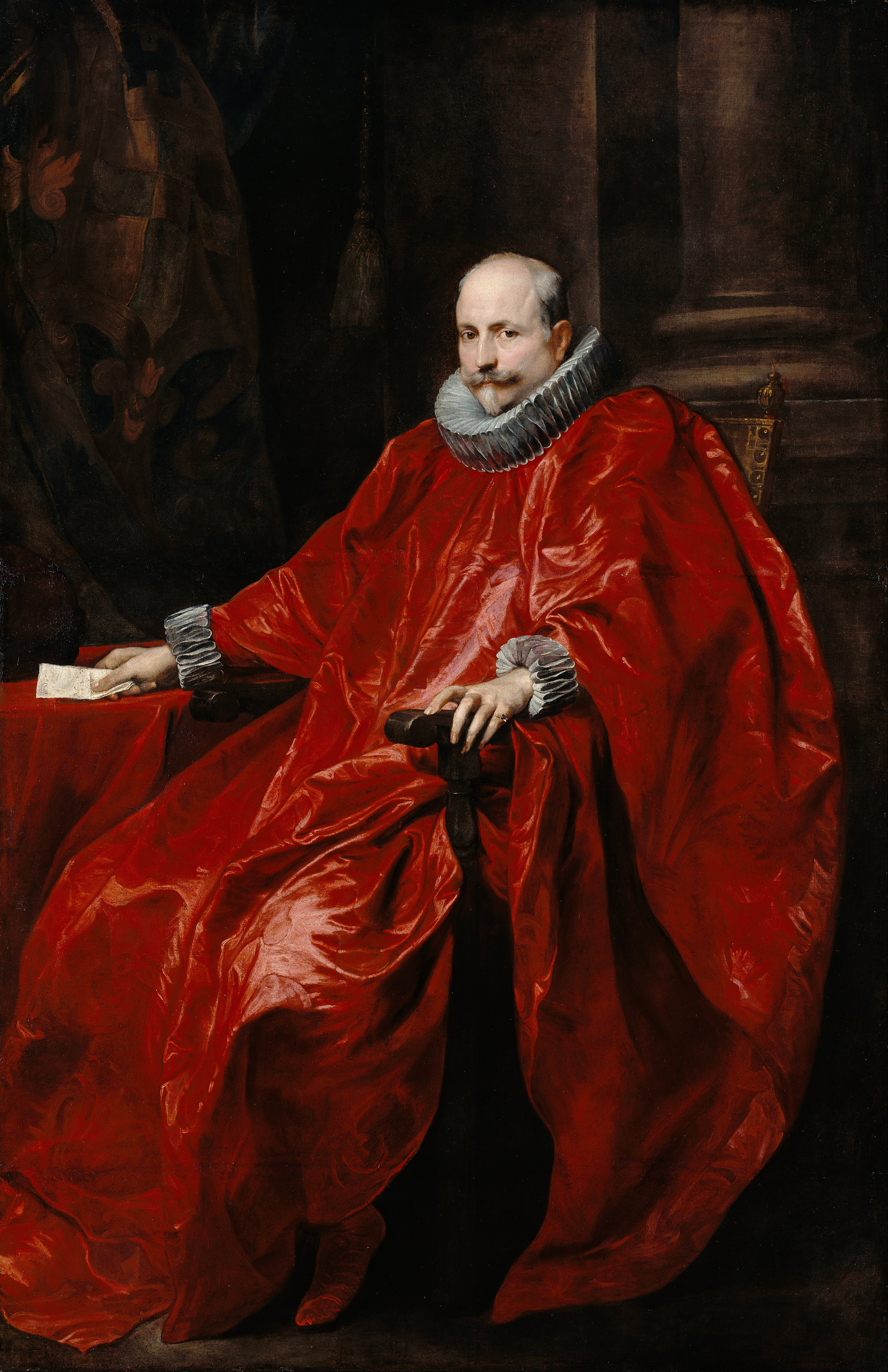
- Agostino Pallavicini
- Style: Altezza Serenissima
- Residence: Palazzo Ducale
- Appointer: Great Council and Minor Council
- Formation: 23 December 1339
- First holder: Simone Boccanegra
- Final holder: Giacomo Maria Brignole
- Abolished: 17 June 1797

The doge of Genoa (/doʊdʒ/ DOHJ) (Note: Ligurian: Dûxe da Repùbrica de Zêna, pronounced [ˈdyːʒe da ɾeˈpybɾika de ˈzeːna]; Italian: Doge della Repubblica di Genova; Latin: Januensium Dux et Populi Defensor, lit. 'Commander of the Genoese and Defender of the People'.) was the head of state of the Republic of Genoa, a city-state and soon afterwards a maritime republic, from 1339 until the state's extinction in 1797. Originally elected for life, after 1528 the doges were elected for terms of two years. The Republic (or Dogate) was ruled by a small group of merchant families, from whom the doges were selected.

== Form of address ==
The Genoese doge's form of address initially was eccelso ('exalted'), then illustrissimo ('most illustrious'), eccellentissimo ('most excellent'), and finally, serenissimo principe ('most serene prince'), signore ('lord'), or altezza serenissima ('most serene highness').

== History ==
Flag of Genoa

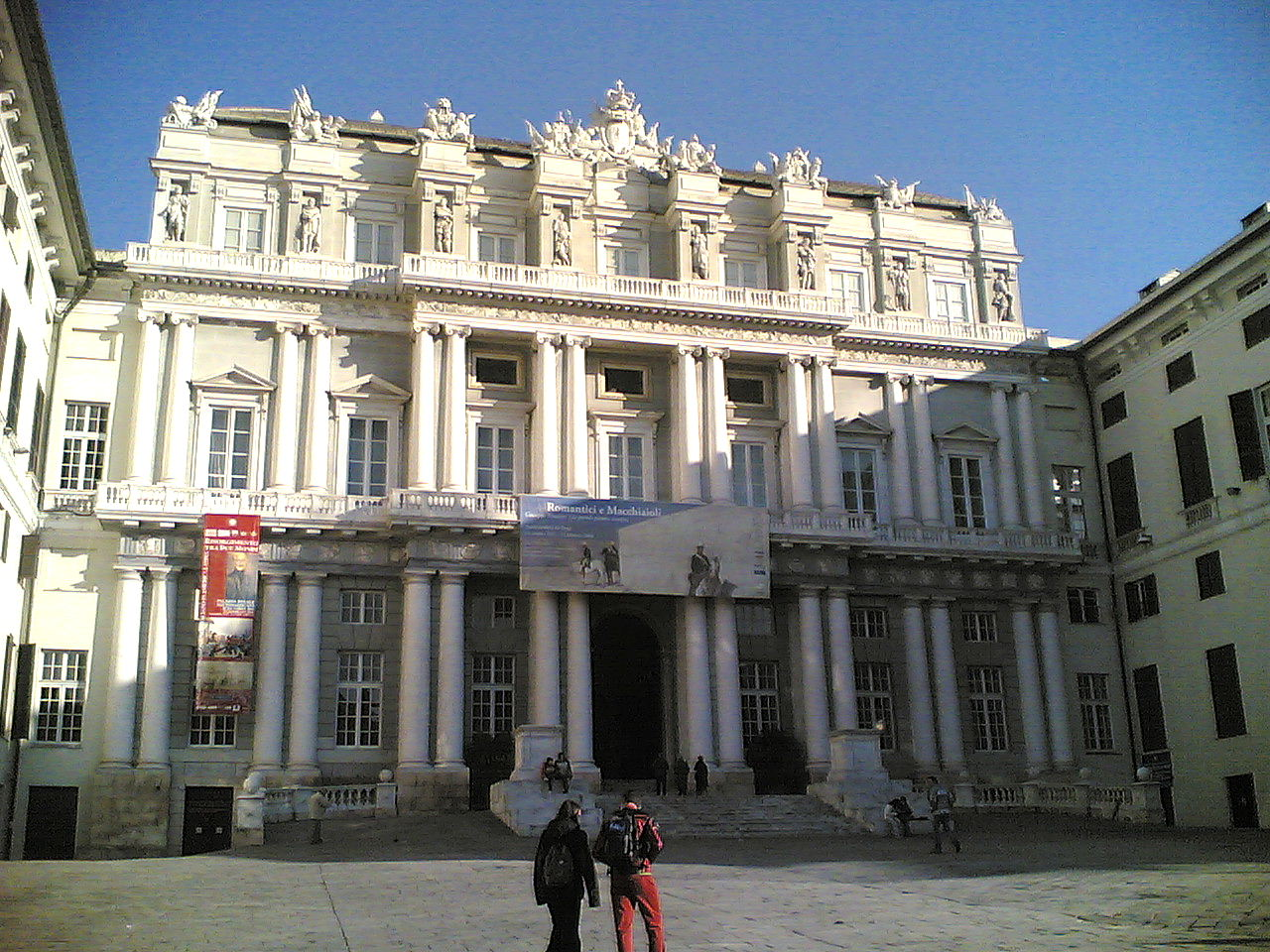
The Palace of the Doges; view from Piazza Matteotti.

The first doge of Genoa, Simone Boccanegra (Ligurian: Scimón Boccanéigra), whose name is kept alive by Verdi's opera, was appointed by public acclaim in 1339. Initially, the doge of Genoa was elected without restriction and by popular suffrage, holding office for life in the so-called "perpetual dogate"; after the reform effected by Andrea Doria in 1528, the term of his office was reduced to two years. At the same time plebeians were declared ineligible, and the appointment of the doge was entrusted to the members of the great council, the Gran Consiglio, who employed for this purpose a complex political system.

The Palazzo Pubblico, where the doges had formerly presided, was expanded in 1388 to accommodate the new ruler and style of government, the first of a series of radical reconstructions. It was renamed Palazzo Ducale and magnificently rebuilt in the 16th century. Until recently the palazzo housed courts, but it now functions as Genoa's cultural centre.

Of all the "perpetual" doges of Genoa who ruled for their lifetime, only one ruled for more than eight years. Many resigned or were driven out before taking office. Some failed to complete a single day in power. Between 1339 and 1528, only four doges were legally elected. Genoa did not trust its doges; the ruling caste of Genoa tied them to executive committees, kept them on a small budget, and kept them apart from the communal revenues held at the Casa di San Giorgio.

Still, the position of Doge stood at the head of state patronage, and the city's inner group of leading merchant families vied with each other to place their man in the position. Rival elections were known to take place within the building. In 1389, a frustrated candidate made a surprise return from enforced exile accompanied by 7,000 supporters, and after dining amicably with the incumbent, politely but firmly ejected him, thanking him for serving so ably as his deputy during his own "unavoidable absence" from Genoa.

For generations two powerful families in Genoa all but monopolized the dogate: the Adorno and the Fregoso or di Campofregoso. Tomaso di Campofregoso became Doge three times: in 1415, 1421 and 1437. In 1461, Paolo Fregoso, archbishop of Genoa, enticed the current doge to his own palace, held him hostage and offered him the choice of retiring from the post or being hanged. When Fregoso was in due course himself toppled, he fled to the harbour, commandeered four galleys and launched himself on a whole new career as a pirate. Among other influential families in the republic were the Spinola, the Grimaldi, the Doria and the Durazzo; all these dynasties gave numerous doges to Genoa. While the doge's palace in Venice accumulated great furnishings and works of art over the years, in Genoa, each Doge was expected to arrive with his own furnishings and, when he left, to strip the palace to its bare walls.

In the 16th century, the republic enjoyed a dramatic revival under the leadership of the admiral, statesman and patron of the arts Andrea Doria who ruled the state as a virtual dictator but never actually became doge. It was through the Spanish empire in the New World that Genoa became rich again. And the bankers of Genoa handled Spain's financial business, which vastly enriched Genoa's banking oligarchy.

The Napoleonic Wars put an end to the office of Doge of Genoa. In 1797, when Napoleon Bonaparte incorporated Genoa into the newly organized Ligurian Republic, French soldiers and the city's mob ransacked the doge's palace.

== Election ==
The doge's election took place through the vote of the members of the Great Council and Minor Council of Genoa that met in a room with the same name at the Doge's Palace. The voting took place by drawing fifty golden balls which were contained in an urn placed in front of the throne. Thanks to a series of successive votes, the number of candidates was reduced to six and, among the latter, the one who obtained the highest number of votes was elected Doge.

== List of doges of Genoa ==
=== Lifetime office-holders ===
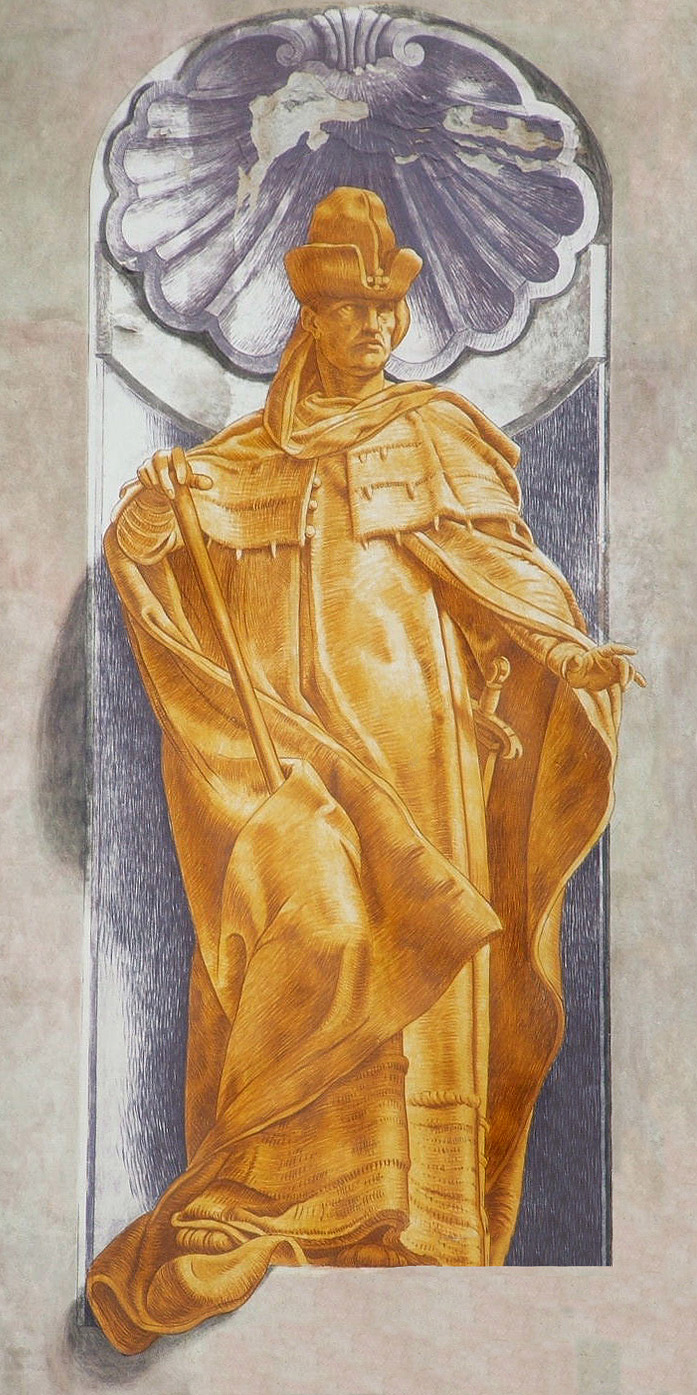
Simone Boccanegra

- Simone Boccanegra, 1339–1344 (first reign)
- Giovanni I di Murta, 1344–1350
- Giovanni II Valente, 1350–1353
- 1353–1356 – Dogeship vacant, Genoa ruled by the Visconti of Milan.
- Simone Boccanegra, 1356–1363, (second reign)
- Gabriele Adorno, 1363–1370
- Domenico di Campofregoso, 1370–1378
- Antoniotto I Adorno, 17 June 1378 (first reign)
- Nicolò Guarco (or Guasco), 1378–1383
- Antoniotto I Adorno (second reign)
- Federico di Pagana, 7 April 1383
- Leonardo Montaldo, 1383–14 June 1384
- Antoniotto I Adorno, 15 June 1384 – 1390 (third reign)
- Giacomo Fregoso, 1390–1391
- Antoniotto I Adorno, 1391–1392 (fourth reign)
- Antoniotto Montaldo, 16 June 1392 – 1393 (first reign)
- Pietro Fregoso, 13 July 1393
- Clemente Promontorio, 13 July 1393
- Francesco Giustiniano di Garibaldo, 14 July 1393 – October 1393
- Antoniotto Montaldo, 1 November 1393 – May 1394 (second reign)
- Niccolo Zoagli, 24 May 1394 – September 1394
- Antonio Guarco, 17 September 1394 – 1 October 1394
- Antoniotto I Adorno, 1394–1396, 5th term
- 1396–1413 – Dogeship vacant. Genoa held by the French.
- Giorgio Adorno, 1413–1415
- Barnaba Guano, 29 March 1415 – 3 July 1415
- Tomaso di Campofregoso, 1415–1421 (first reign)
- 1421–1436 – Dogeship vacant. Genoa controlled by Milan.
- Isnardo Guarco, serves as doge for one week in 1436
- Tomaso di Campofregoso, 1436–1437 (second reign)
- Battista Fregoso served as doge for a few hours
- Tomaso di Campofregoso, 1437–1442 (third reign)
- Raffaele Adorno, 28 Jan 1443 – 4 Jan 1447
- Barnaba Adorno, 4 Jan 1447 – 30 Jan 1447
- Giano I di Campofregoso, 30 Jan 1447 – Dec 1448
- Lodovico di Campofregoso, 1448–1450 (first reign)
- Pietro di Campofregoso, 1450–1458
- 1458–1461 – Dogeship vacant. Genoa occupied by France.
- Prospero Adorno, 12 March 1461 – 8 July 1461
- Spinetta Fregoso, 8 July 1461 – 11 July 1461
- Lodovico di Campofregoso, July 1461 – March 1462 (second reign)
- Paolo Fregoso, March 1462, served simultaneously as Archbishop of Genoa.
- Lodovico di Campofregoso, 8 June 1462 (third reign)
- Paolo Fregoso, 9 June 1462 – late 1463 (second reign)
- Genoa accepts the rule of Francesco Sforza, no doge, 1463–1477
- Prospero Adorno, 17 Aug 1477 – 25 Nov 1477 (second reign)
- Battista Fregoso, 26 November 1478 – 25 November 1483
- Paolo Fregoso, 1483–1488 (third reign)
- 1488–1499 – Dogeship vacant. Genoa ruled by Sforza.
- 1499–1507 – Dogeship vacant. Genoa occupied by France.
- Paolo da Novi, 10 April 1507 – late 1507
- 1507–1511 – Dogeship vacant. Genoa occupied by France.
- Giano II di Campofregoso, 1512–1513
- Ottaviano Fregoso, 1513–1515
- 1515–1522 – Dogeship vacant. Genoa occupied by France.
- Antoniotto II Adorno, 1522–1527
- 1527–1528 – Dogeship vacant. Genoa ruled by France.

=== Doges elected for two years ===
==== From 1528 to 1599 ====
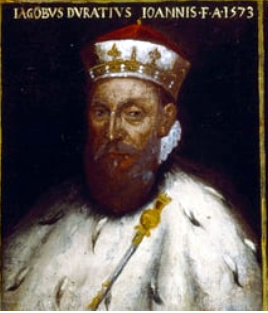
Giacomo Grimaldi Durazzo

| From | To | Doge | Notes |
|---|---|---|---|
| 12 October 1528 | 4 January 1531 | Oberto Cattaneo Lazzari | |
| 4 January 1531 | 4 January 1533 | Battista Spinola | |
| 4 January 1533 | 4 January 1535 | Battista Lomellini | |
| 4 January 1535 | 4 January 1537 | Cristoforo Grimaldi Rosso | |
| 4 January 1537 | 4 January 1539 | Giovanni Battista Doria | |
| 4 January 1539 | 4 January 1541 | Giannandrea Giustiniani Longo | |
| 4 January 1541 | 4 January 1543 | Leonardo Cattaneo della Volta | |
| 4 January 1543 | 4 January 1545 | Andrea Centurione Pietrasanta | |
| 4 January 1545 | 4 January 1547 | Giovanni Battista De Fornari | |
| 4 January 1547 | 4 January 1549 | Benedetto Gentile Pevere | |
| 4 January 1549 | 4 January 1551 | Gaspare Grimaldi Bracelli | |
| 4 January 1551 | 4 January 1553 | Luca Spinola | |
| 4 January 1553 | 4 January 1555 | Giacomo Promontorio | |
| 4 January 1555 | 4 January 1557 | Agostino Pinelli Ardimenti | |
| 4 January 1557 | 3 December 1558 | Pietro Giovanni Chiavica Cibo | Died in office. |
| 4 January 1559 | 4 January 1561 | Girolamo Vivaldi | |
| 4 January 1561 | 27 September 1561 | Paolo Battista Giudice Calvi | Died in office. |
| 4 October 1561 | 4 October 1563 | Giovanni Battista Cicala Zoagli | |
| 7 October 1563 | 7 October 1565 | Giovanni Battista Lercari | |
| 11 October 1565 | 11 October 1567 | Ottavio Gentile Oderico | |
| 15 October 1567 | 3 October 1569 | Simone Spinola | |
| 6 October 1569 | 6 October 1571 | Paolo Giustiniani Moneglia | |
| 10 October 1571 | 10 October 1573 | Giannotto Lomellini | |
| 16 October 1573 | 17 October 1575 | Giacomo Grimaldi Durazzo | |
| 17 October 1575 | 17 October 1577 | Prospero Centurione Fattinanti | |
| 19 October 1577 | 19 October 1579 | Giovanni Battista Gentile Pignolo | |
| 20 October 1579 | 20 October 1581 | Nicolò Doria | |
| 21 October 1581 | 21 October 1583 | Gerolamo De Franchi Toso | |
| 4 November 1583 | 4 November 1585 | Gerolamo Chiavari | |
| 8 November 1585 | 13 November 1587 | Ambrogio Di Negro | |
| 14 November 1587 | 14 November 1589 | Davide Vacca | |
| 20 November 1589 | 15 November 1591 | Battista Negrone | |
| 27 November 1591 | 26 November 1593 | Giovanni Agostino Giustiniani Campi | |
| 27 November 1593 | 26 November 1595 | Antonio Grimaldi Cebà | |
| 5 December 1595 | 4 December 1597 | Matteo Senarega | |
| 7 December 1597 | 15 February 1599 | Lazzaro Grimaldi Cebà | |

==== From 1599 to 1650 ====
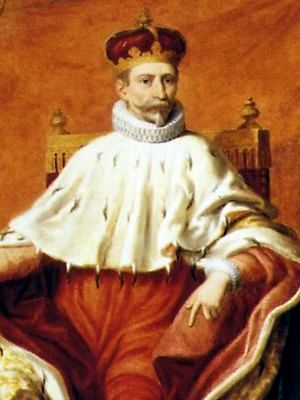
Giovanni Francesco I Brignole Sale

| From | To | Doge | Notes |
|---|---|---|---|
| 22 February 1599 | 21 February 1601 | Lorenzo Sauli | |
| 24 February 1601 | 25 February 1603 | Agostino Doria | |
| 26 February 1603 | 27 February 1605 | Pietro De Franchi Sacco | |
| 1 March 1605 | 2 March 1607 | Luca Grimaldi De Castro | |
| 3 March 1607 | 17 March 1607 | Silvestro Invrea | |
| 22 March 1607 | 23 March 1609 | Gerolamo Assereto | |
| 1 April 1609 | 2 April 1611 | Agostino Pinelli Luciani | |
| 6 April 1611 | 6 April 1613 | Alessandro Giustiniani Longo | |
| 21 April 1613 | 21 April 1615 | Tomaso Spinola | |
| 25 April 1615 | 25 April 1617 | Bernardo Clavarezza | |
| 25 April 1617 | 29 April 1619 | Giovanni Giacomo Imperiale Tartaro | |
| 2 May 1619 | 2 May 1621 | Pietro Durazzo | |
| 4 May 1621 | 12 June 1621 | Ambrogio Doria | Died in office. |
| 22 June 1621 | 22 June 1623 | Giorgio Centurione | |
| 25 June 1623 | 16 June 1625 | Federico De Franchi Toso | |
| 16 June 1625 | 25 June 1627 | Giacomo Lomellini | |
| 28 June 1627 | 28 June 1629 | Giovanni Luca Chiavari | |
| 26 June 1629 | 26 June 1631 | Andrea Spinola | |
| 30 June 1631 | 30 June 1633 | Leonardo Della Torre | |
| 5 July 1633 | 5 July 1635 | Giovanni Stefano Doria | |
| 11 July 1635 | 11 July 1637 | Giovanni Francesco I Brignole Sale | |
| 13 July 1637 | 13 July 1639 | Agostino Pallavicini | |
| 28 July 1639 | 28 July 1641 | Giovanni Battista Durazzo | |
| 14 August 1641 | 19 June 1642 | Giovanni Agostino De Marini | Died in office. |
| 4 July 1642 | 4 July 1644 | Giovanni Battista Lercari | |
| 21 July 1644 | 21 July 1646 | Luca Giustiniani | |
| 24 July 1646 | 24 July 1648 | Giovanni Battista Lomellini | |
| 1 August 1648 | 1 August 1650 | Giacomo De Franchi Toso | |

==== From 1650 to 1699 ====
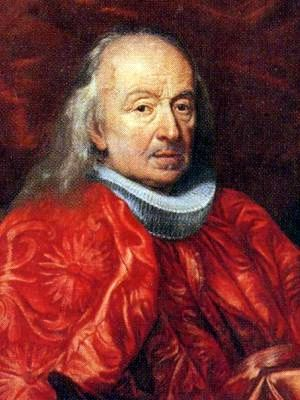
Oberto Della Torre

| From | To | Doge | Notes |
|---|---|---|---|
| 23 August 1650 | 23 August 1652 | Agostino Centurione | |
| 8 September 1652 | 8 September 1654 | Gerolamo De Franchi Toso | |
| 9 October 1654 | 9 October 1656 | Alessandro Spinola | |
| 12 October 1656 | 12 October 1658 | Giulio Sauli | |
| 15 October 1658 | 15 October 1660 | Giovanni Battista Centurione | |
| 28 October 1660 | 22 March 1661 | Gian Bernardo Frugoni | Died in office. |
| 28 March 1661 | 29 March 1663 | Antoniotto Invrea | |
| 13 April 1663 | 12 April 1665 | Stefano De Mari | |
| 18 April 1665 | 18 April 1667 | Cesare Durazzo | |
| 10 May 1667 | 10 May 1669 | Cesare Gentile | |
| 18 June 1669 | 18 June 1671 | Francesco Garbarino | |
| 27 June 1671 | 27 June 1673 | Alessandro Grimaldi | |
| 5 July 1673 | 4 July 1675 | Agostino Saluzzo | |
| 11 July 1675 | 11 July 1677 | Antonio Da Passano | |
| 16 July 1677 | 16 July 1679 | Giannettino Odone | |
| 29 July 1679 | 29 July 1681 | Agostino Spinola | |
| 13 August 1681 | 13 August 1683 | Luca Maria Invrea | |
| 18 August 1683 | 18 August 1685 | Francesco Maria Imperiale Lercari | |
| 23 August 1685 | 23 August 1687 | Pietro Durazzo | |
| 27 August 1687 | 27 August 1689 | Luca Spinola | |
| 31 August 1689 | 1 September 1691 | Oberto Della Torre | |
| 4 September 1691 | 5 September 1693 | Giovanni Battista Cattaneo Della Volta | |
| 9 September 1693 | 9 September 1695 | Francesco Invrea | |
| 16 September 1695 | 16 September 1697 | Bendinelli Negrone | |
| 19 September 1697 | 26 May 1699 | Francesco Maria Sauli | Died in office. |

==== From 1699 to 1750 ====
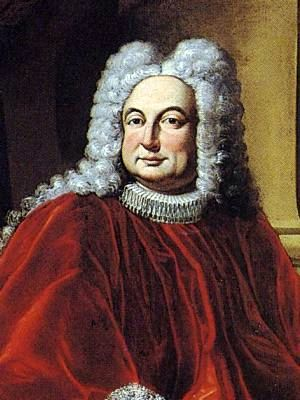
Nicolò Cattaneo Della Volta

| From | To | Doge | Notes |
|---|---|---|---|
| 3 June 1699 | 3 June 1701 | Girolamo De Mari | |
| 7 June 1701 | 7 June 1703 | Federico De Franchi Toso | |
| 1 August 1703 | 1 August 1705 | Antonio Grimaldi | |
| 22 August 1705 | 22 August 1707 | Stefano Onorato Ferretti | |
| 9 September 1707 | 9 September 1709 | Domenico Maria De Mari | |
| 14 September 1709 | 14 September 1711 | Vincenzo Durazzo | |
| 22 September 1711 | 22 September 1713 | Francesco Maria Imperiale | |
| 22 September 1713 | 22 September 1715 | Giovanni Antonio Giustiniani | |
| 26 September 1715 | 26 September 1717 | Lorenzo Centurione | |
| 30 September 1717 | 30 September 1719 | Benedetto Viale | |
| 4 October 1719 | 4 October 1721 | Ambrogio Imperiale | |
| 8 October 1721 | 8 October 1723 | Cesare De Franchi Toso | |
| 13 October 1723 | 13 October 1725 | Domenico Negrone | |
| 18 January 1726 | 18 January 1728 | Gerolamo Veneroso | |
| 22 January 1728 | 22 January 1730 | Luca Grimaldi | |
| 20 January 1730 | 20 January 1732 | Francesco Maria Balbi | |
| 29 January 1732 | 29 January 1734 | Domenico Maria Spinola | |
| 3 February 1734 | 3 February 1736 | Stefano Durazzo | |
| 7 February 1736 | 7 February 1738 | Nicolò Cattaneo Della Volta | 2nd King of Corsica (following the downfall of Theodor Stephan Freiherr von Neuhoff, the island was annexed to Genoa and the doges also became Kings of Corsica). |
| 7 February 1738 | 7 February 1740 | Costantino Balbi | 3rd King of Corsica |
| 16 February 1740 | 16 February 1742 | Nicolò Spinola | 4th King of Corsica |
| 20 February 1742 | 20 February 1744 | Domenico Canevaro | 5th King of Corsica |
| 1 February 1744 | 1 February 1746 | Lorenzo De Mari | 6th King of Corsica |
| 3 March 1746 | 3 March 1748 | Giovanni Francesco II Brignole Sale | 7th King of Corsica |
| 6 March 1748 | 6 March 1750 | Cesare Cattaneo Della Volta | 8th King of Corsica |

==== From 1750 to 1797 ====
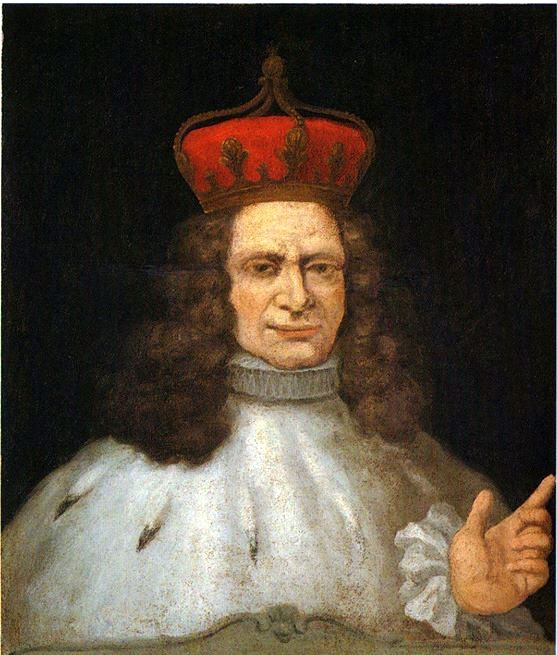
Stefano Lomellini

| From | To | Doge | Notes |
|---|---|---|---|
| 10 March 1750 | 10 March 1752 | Agostino Viale | 9th King of Corsica |
| 28 March 1752 | 7 June 1752 | Stefano Lomellini | 10th King of Corsica. Abdicated |
| 7 June 1752 | 7 June 1754 | Giovanni Battista Grimaldi | 11th King of Corsica |
| 23 June 1754 | 23 June 1756 | Gian Giacomo Veneroso | 12th and last King of Corsica |
| 22 June 1756 | 22 June 1758 | Giovanni Giacomo Grimaldi | |
| 22 August 1758 | 22 August 1760 | Matteo Franzoni | |
| 22 September 1760 | 10 September 1762 | Agostino Lomellini | |
| 25 November 1762 | 25 November 1764 | Rodolfo Emilio Brignole Sale | |
| 29 January 1765 | 29 January 1767 | Francesco Maria Della Rovere | |
| 3 February 1767 | 3 February 1769 | Marcello Durazzo | |
| 16 February 1769 | 16 February 1771 | Giovanni Battista Negrone | |
| 16 April 1771 | 16 April 1773 | Giovanni Battista Cambiaso | |
| 7 January 1773 | 9 January 1773 | Ferdinando Spinola | |
| 26 January 1773 | 26 January 1775 | Pier Francesco Grimaldi | |
| 31 January 1775 | 31 January 1777 | Brizio Giustiniani | |
| 4 February 1777 | 4 February 1779 | Giuseppe Lomellini | |
| 4 March 1779 | 4 March 1781 | Giacomo Maria Brignole | |
| 8 March 1781 | 8 March 1783 | Marco Antonio Gentile | |
| 6 May 1783 | 6 May 1785 | Giovanni Battista Ayroli | |
| 6 June 1785 | 6 June 1787 | Gian Carlo Pallavicino | |
| 4 July 1787 | 4 July 1789 | Raffaele Agostino De Ferrari | |
| 30 July 1789 | 30 July 1791 | Alerame Maria Pallavicini | |
| 3 September 1791 | 3 September 1793 | Michelangelo Cambiaso | |
| 16 September 1793 | 16 September 1795 | Giuseppe Maria Doria | |
| 17 November 1795 | 17 November 1797 | Giacomo Maria Brignole | Final Genoese Doge. Position abolished after Napoleon took Genoa. |

- A complete list is at Italian Wikipedia: Elenco dei Dogi della Repubblica di Genova.

== See also ==
- Doge of Venice
