= Cesare Cattaneo Della Volta =

Doge of the Republic of Genoa

159th Doge of the Republic of Genoa
- In office 6 March 1748 – 6 March 1750
- Preceded by: Giovanni Francesco II Brignole Sale
- Succeeded by: Agostino Viale

Personal details
- Born: 1680 Genoa, Republic of Genoa
- Died: 22 July 1756 (aged 75–76) Genoa, Republic of Genoa

Cesare Cattaneo Della Volta (Genoa, 1680 - Genoa, 22 July 1756) was the 159th Doge of the Republic of Genoa.

== Biography ==
Officially crowned on 31 August, his mandate as Doge was marked by the end of hostilities and the signing of the Treaty of Aix-la-Chapelle, in 1748, that brought a new air of hope and tranquility for the neo doge, and for the Genoese, after the clashes and riots of the people. Reabsorbed the territories of Finale and the colony of Corsica, the doge Cesare Cattaneo Della Volta actively worked for the return of the normalization of those political-social relations that the anti-oligarchic jolts that emerged during the revolt itself had threatened to crack. Ceased office as doge on 6 March 1750, he did not retire to private life, but rather continued to serve the state machine even in the post-customs period. The former doge died on 22 July 1756 leaving his only heirs the nephews Giovan Battista and Giacomo Cattaneo Della Volta, sons of the already deceased brother, and former doge Nicolò.

== See also ==
- Republic of Genoa
- Doge of Genoa

== Sources ==
- Buonadonna, Sergio. Rosso doge. I dogi della Repubblica di Genova dal 1339 al 1797.
