= Ambrogio Imperiale =

Doge of the Republic of Genoa and king of Corsica

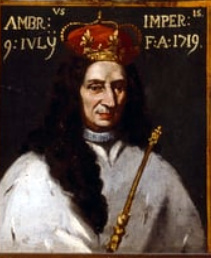

145th Doge of the Republic of Genoa
- In office 4 October 1719 – 4 October 1721
- Preceded by: Benedetto Viale
- Succeeded by: Cesare De Franchi Toso

Personal details
- Born: 1649 Genoa, Republic of Genoa
- Died: 1729 (aged 79–80) Genoa, Republic of Genoa

Ambrogio Imperiale (Genoa, 1649 - Genoa, 1729) was the 145th Doge of the Republic of Genoa and king of Corsica.

== Biography ==
Ambrogio Imperiale held other public offices before the dogate until the elections of 4 October 1719, which with a large majority consensus sanctioned his appointment as doge of Genoa, the hundredth in biennial succession and the one hundred and forty-fifth in republican history. As doge he was also invested with the related biennial office of king of Corsica. In his mandate, during 1721, the celebrations for the anniversary of the coronation of the Virgin Mary as queen of Genoa are remembered, an anniversary that took place every 25 years in Genoa. He ended his term on 4 October 1721. Suffering from Gout even before the dogal election, he died in Genoa in 1729.

== See also ==
- Republic of Genoa
- Doge of Genoa
- Imperiali family
