= Cesare De Franchi Toso =

Doge of the Republic of Genoa and king of Corsica

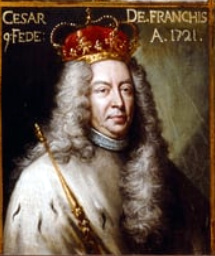

146th Doge of the Republic of Genoa
- In office October 8, 1721 – October 8, 1723
- Preceded by: Ambrogio Imperiale
- Succeeded by: Domenico Negrone

Personal details
- Born: 1666 Genoa, Republic of Genoa
- Died: 1739 (aged 72–73) Genoa, Republic of Genoa

Cesare De Franchi Toso (Genoa, 1666 – Genoa, 1739) was the 146th Doge of the Republic of Genoa and king of Corsica.

== Biography ==
Born in Genoa in a period around 1666, Cesare De Franchi held numerous public offices from the age of majority for the Genoese state. His election as doge of the Republic of Genoa took place on 8 October 1721, the one hundred and first in biennial succession and the one hundred and forty-sixth in republican history. As doge he was also invested with the related biennial office of king of Corsica. He died in Genoa in 1739.

== See also ==
- Republic of Genoa
- Doge of Genoa
