= Lorenzo Centurione =

Doge of the Republic of Genoa and king of Corsica

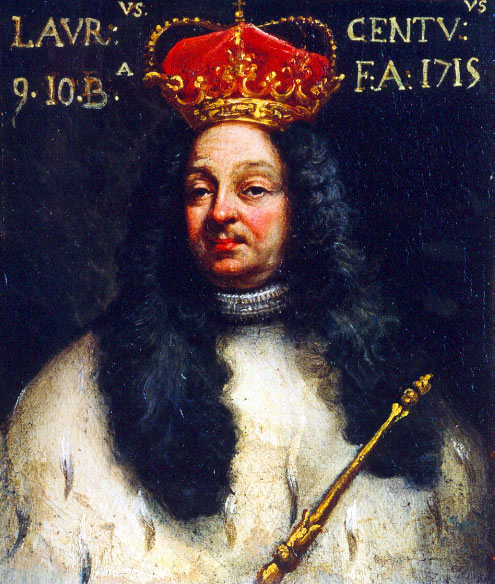

143rd Doge of the Republic of Genoa
- In office 26 September 1715 – 26 September 1717
- Preceded by: Giovanni Antonio Giustiniani
- Succeeded by: Benedetto Viale

Personal details
- Born: 1645 Genoa, Republic of Genoa
- Died: 1735 (aged 89–90) Genoa, Republic of Genoa

Lorenzo Centurione (Genoa, 1645 - Genoa, 1735) was the 143rd Doge of the Republic of Genoa and king of Corsica.

== Biography ==
On 26 September 1715, the Grand Council elected him as the new doge of the Republic of Genoa, the ninety-eighth in biennial succession and the one hundred and forty-third in republican history. As doge, he was also invested with the related biennial office of king of Corsica. Once the mandate ended on 26 September 1717, Lorenzo Centurione held other public offices. He died in Genoa around 1735.

== See also ==
- Republic of Genoa
- Doge of Genoa
