= Domenico Maria Spinola =

Doge of the Republic of Genoa and king of Corsica

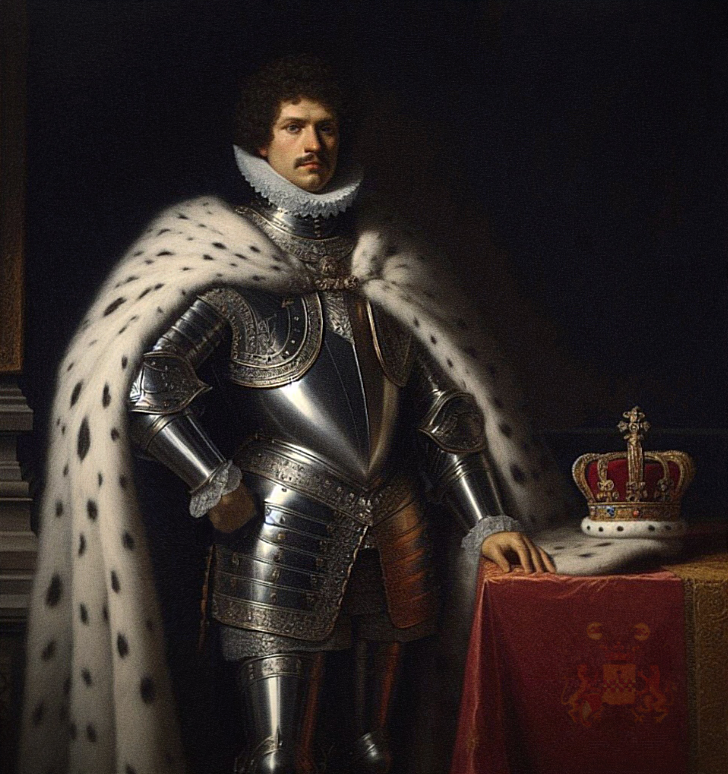

151st Doge of the Republic of Genoa
- In office 29 January 1732 – 29 January 1734
- Preceded by: Francesco Maria Balbi
- Succeeded by: Stefano Durazzo

Personal details
- Born: 1666 Bastia, Republic of Genoa
- Died: 1743 (aged 76–77) Bastia, Republic of Genoa

Domenico Maria Spinola (Bastia, 1666 – Bastia, 1743) was the 151st Doge of the Republic of Genoa and king of Corsica.

== Biography ==
The Grand Council of 29 January 1732 elected him the new doge of the Republic of Genoa, the one hundred and sixth in biennial succession and the one hundred and fifty-first in republican history. As doge he was also invested with the related biennial office of the king of Corsica.

== See also ==
- Republic of Genoa
- Doge of Genoa
