= Costantino Balbi =

Doge of the Republic of Genoa and king of Corsica

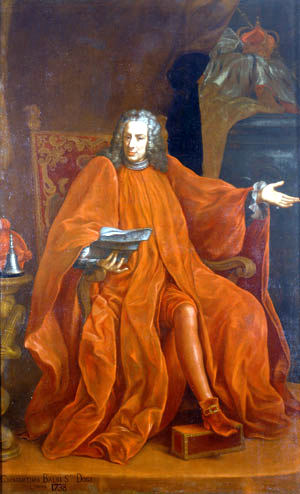

154th Doge of the Republic of Genoa
- In office February 7, 1738 – February 7, 1740
- Preceded by: Nicolò Cattaneo Della Volta
- Succeeded by: Nicolò Spinola

Personal details
- Born: September 12, 1676 Genoa, Republic of Genoa
- Died: 1741 (aged 64–65) Genoa, Republic of Genoa

Costantino Balbi (Genoa, 12 September 1676 - Genoa, 1741) was the 154th Doge of the Republic of Genoa and king of Corsica.

== Biography ==
On February 7, 1738, he was elected by the Grand Council as the new doge of the Republic: the one hundred and eighth in biennial succession and the one hundred and fifty-fourth in republican history. As doge he was also invested with the related biennial office of king of Corsica. Ceased the dogal office on February 7, 1740 and retired to private life, he died in Genoa in 1741.

== See also ==
- Republic of Genoa
- Doge of Genoa
