= Stefano Onorato Ferretti =

Doge of the Republic of Genoa and king of Corsica

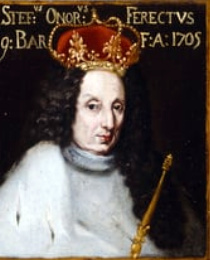

138th Doge of the Republic of Genoa
- In office 22 August 1705 – 22 August 1707
- Preceded by: Antonio Grimaldi
- Succeeded by: Domenico Maria De Mari

Personal details
- Born: 1640 Genoa, Republic of Genoa
- Died: 19 August 1720 (aged 79–80) Genoa, Republic of Genoa

Stefano Onorato Ferretti (1640 – 19 August 1720) was the 138th Doge of the Republic of Genoa and king of Corsica.

== Biography ==
Closer to a "conservationist" republican policy, as opposed to a vision of a more modern Genoese state and open to future scenarios, Stefano Onorato Ferretti won a significant majority of votes in the customs elections of 22 August 1705; as doge he was also invested with the related biennial office of king of Corsica. The mandate, the ninety-third in biennial succession and the one hundred and thirty-eighth in republican history, ended on 22 August 1707. Among the important events during his term as doge was the passage and reception in Genoa of Duke Victor Amadeus II of Savoy.

== See also ==
- Doge of Genoa
- Republic of Genoa
