= Giovanni Battista Negrone =

Doge of the Republic of Genoa

170th Doge of the Republic of Genoa
- In office 16 February 1769 – 26 January 1771
- Preceded by: Marcello Durazzo
- Succeeded by: Giovanni Battista Cambiaso

Personal details
- Born: 22 April 1714 Genoa, Republic of Genoa
- Died: 26 January 1771 (aged 56) Genoa, Republic of Genoa

Giovanni Battista Negrone (22 April 1714 in Genoa – 26 January 1771 in Genoa) was the 170th Doge of the Republic of Genoa.

== Biography ==
On 16 February 1769 the Grand Council elected Battista Negrone the new Doge of Genoa, the one hundred and twenty-fifth in biennial succession and the one hundred and seventieth in the history of the Republic of Genoa. The coronation took place in the Genoa Cathedral on 11 June.

The Doge's mandate authorised the abolition of the cloistered prisons, which were followed by their relative demolitions. The repeal of torture, despite the support of Doge Negrone and the approval with full marks from the colleges, nevertheless found the opposition of the supreme trade unions.

Almost at the end of the two-year period of his position in office, the Doge Giovanni Battista Negrone fell ill on 26 January 1771. It was the archbishop Giovanni Lercari who administered in communion to him as requested by the Doge himself.

Assisted by various priests and his personal confessor, he died on the evening of 26 January 1771.

== See also ==
- Republic of Genoa
- Doge of Genoa
