= Gerolamo Veneroso =

Doge of the Republic of Genoa

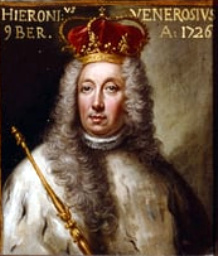

148th Doge of the Republic of Genoa
- In office January 18, 1726 – January 18, 1728
- Preceded by: Domenico Negrone
- Succeeded by: Luca Grimaldi

Personal details
- Born: 1660 Genoa, Republic of Genoa
- Died: 1739 (aged 78–79) Genoa, Republic of Genoa

Gerolamo Veneroso (1660 in Genoa – 1739 in Genoa) was the 148th Doge of the Republic of Genoa and king of Corsica.

== Biography ==
Veneroso was elected doge on January 18, 1726, the one hundred and third in biennial succession and one hundred and forty-eighth in republican history. As doge he was also invested with the related biennial office of king of Corsica. Among the significant events of his mandate, his commitment against the smuggling that raged in western Liguria is attested. The dogato ended on January 18, 1728. Veneroso died in Genoa in 1739.

== See also ==
- Republic of Genoa
- Doge of Genoa

== Sources ==
- Buonadonna, Sergio. Rosso doge. I dogi della Repubblica di Genova dal 1339 al 1797.
