= Agostino Viale =

Doge of the Republic of Genoa

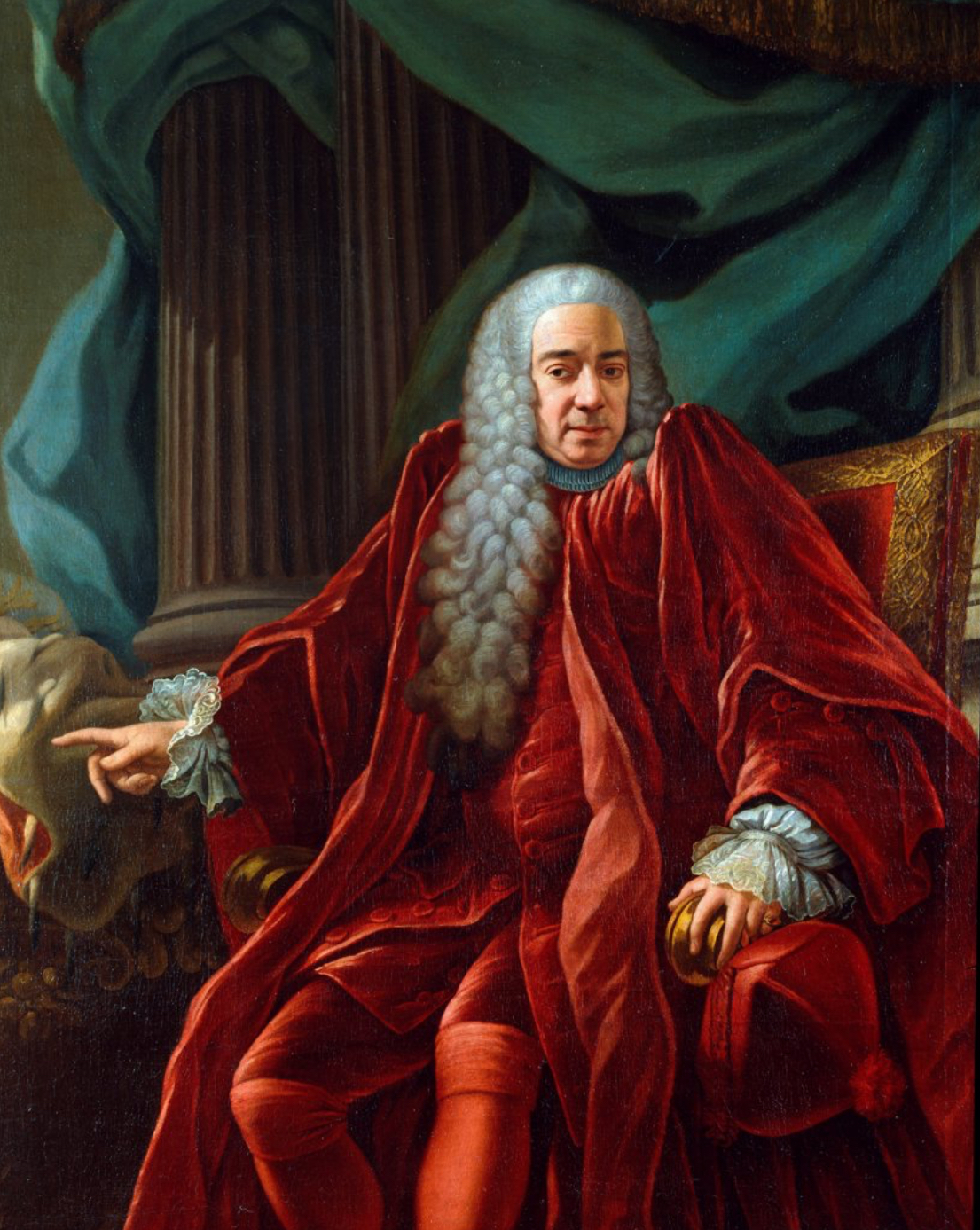
- Portrait by Francisco Naurice c. 1750

160th Doge of the Republic of Genoa
- In office 10 March 1750 – 10 March 1752
- Preceded by: Cesare Cattaneo Della Volta
- Succeeded by: Stefano Lomellini

Personal details
- Born: 1692 Genoa, Republic of Genoa
- Died: 1777 (aged 84–85) Genoa, Republic of Genoa

Agostino Viale (Genova, 1692 - Genova, 1777) was the 160th Doge of the Republic of Genoa.

== Biography ==
Son of Benedetto Viale, doge of the Genoese republic in the period 1717-1719, he was born in Genoa in 1692 and baptized in the Basilica Santa Maria delle Vigne. Viale received school education in Rome, at the Collegio Clementino. On 10 March 1750 he was elected by the Grand Council as the new doge of the Republic of Genoa, the one hundred and fifteenth in biennial succession and the one hundred and sixtieth in republican history. And the expenses for his coronation ceremony, from the banquet to the cost of the new customs liveries created for the occasion, were considered excessive by a part of the nobility for the Genoese coffers, considering the substantial monetary heritage of the neo doge. No details or important facts are known of the Dogate of Viale, a mandate which ended on 10 March 1752. He died in Genoa in 1777.

== See also ==
- Republic of Genoa
- Doge of Genoa
