= Marcello Durazzo (Doge of Genoa) =

Doge of the Republic of Genoa

169th Doge of the Republic of Genoa
- In office February 3, 1767 – February 3, 1769
- Preceded by: Francesco Maria Della Rovere
- Succeeded by: Giovanni Battista Negrone

Personal details
- Born: 1710 Genoa, Republic of Genoa
- Died: 1791 (aged 80–81) Genoa, Republic of Genoa

Marcello Durazzo (Genoa, 1710 - Genoa, December 1791) was the 169th Doge of the Republic of Genoa.

== Biography ==
On February 3, 1767 Durazzo became Doge of Genoa. His Dogate was marked by the definitive loss of the island of Corsica to France, in the Treaty of Versailles. On February 3, 1769, he ended his Dogate and later became head of the war magistrate and state inquisitors. Then Durazzo became deputy for the works of the Port of Savona and had the fort of Vado built, always on a personal design, which was then called Forte Marcello in his honor. Until 1791 he had three positions: protector of the "Jewish nation", magistrate of the Worship and protector of the Holy Office. Durazzo died in Genoa in December 1791 at 81 years old.

== See also ==
- Republic of Genoa
- Doge of Genoa
