= Benedetto Viale =

Doge of the Republic of Genoa and king of Corsica

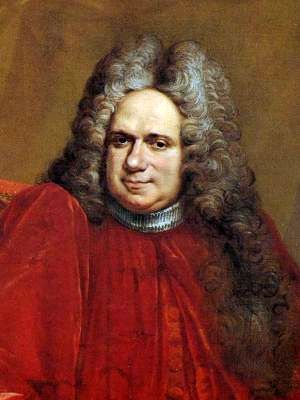

144th Doge of the Republic of Genoa
- In office September 30, 1717 – September 30, 1719
- Preceded by: Lorenzo Centurione
- Succeeded by: Ambrogio Imperiale

Personal details
- Born: 1660 Genoa, Republic of Genoa
- Died: 1749 (aged 88–89) Genoa, Republic of Genoa

Benedetto Viale (Genoa, 1660 - Genoa, 1749) was the 144th Doge of the Republic of Genoa and king of Corsica.

== Biography ==
Born in Genoa around 1660, he held his first public positions as representative of the Republic of Genoa in various European courts: at the Crown of Aragon, in Rome at the Holy See, in England, France and in the Netherlands. Back in the Genoese borders, Benedetto Viale was appointed syndicator of the West Riviera in 1696, of the Rota Criminale in 1703 and in the magistrates of the War, of the Cambi and, again, a member of the Inquisitors of State in 1713.

Praised and appreciated for his correct use and pronunciation of languages, learned and deepened during his stays as a diplomat in other countries, the Grand Council elected him the new doge of Genoa on 30 September 1717, the ninety-ninth in two-year succession and the one hundred and forty-fourth in republican history. As doge he was also invested with the related biennial office of king of Corsica.

A serious drought crisis that affected Genoa and Liguria in the summer of 1718 is mentioned in his Genoese annals. On his express order, for August 2, the Genoese were asked to close every shop and commercial activity, to clean the streets of the city as for the annual Corpus Christi festival and - as a grace - to go to a solemn religious procession with the ashes of the patron, John the Baptist. A few days later a modest amount of water rained from the sky which quenched the fields and the people: the population, cheering, and again for an order given by the doge Benedetto Viale intoned a Te Deum of thanks.

After the mandate ended on September 30, 1719, it is probable that he still held other public offices. He died in Genoa around 1749 where he was buried in the church of San Rocco in Granarolo. From the marriage to Giovanna D'Aste he had one son, Agostino Viale, who in 1750 became doge of the Republic of Genoa.

== See also ==
- Republic of Genoa
- Doge of Genoa
