= Alerame Maria Pallavicini =

Doge of the Republic of Genoa

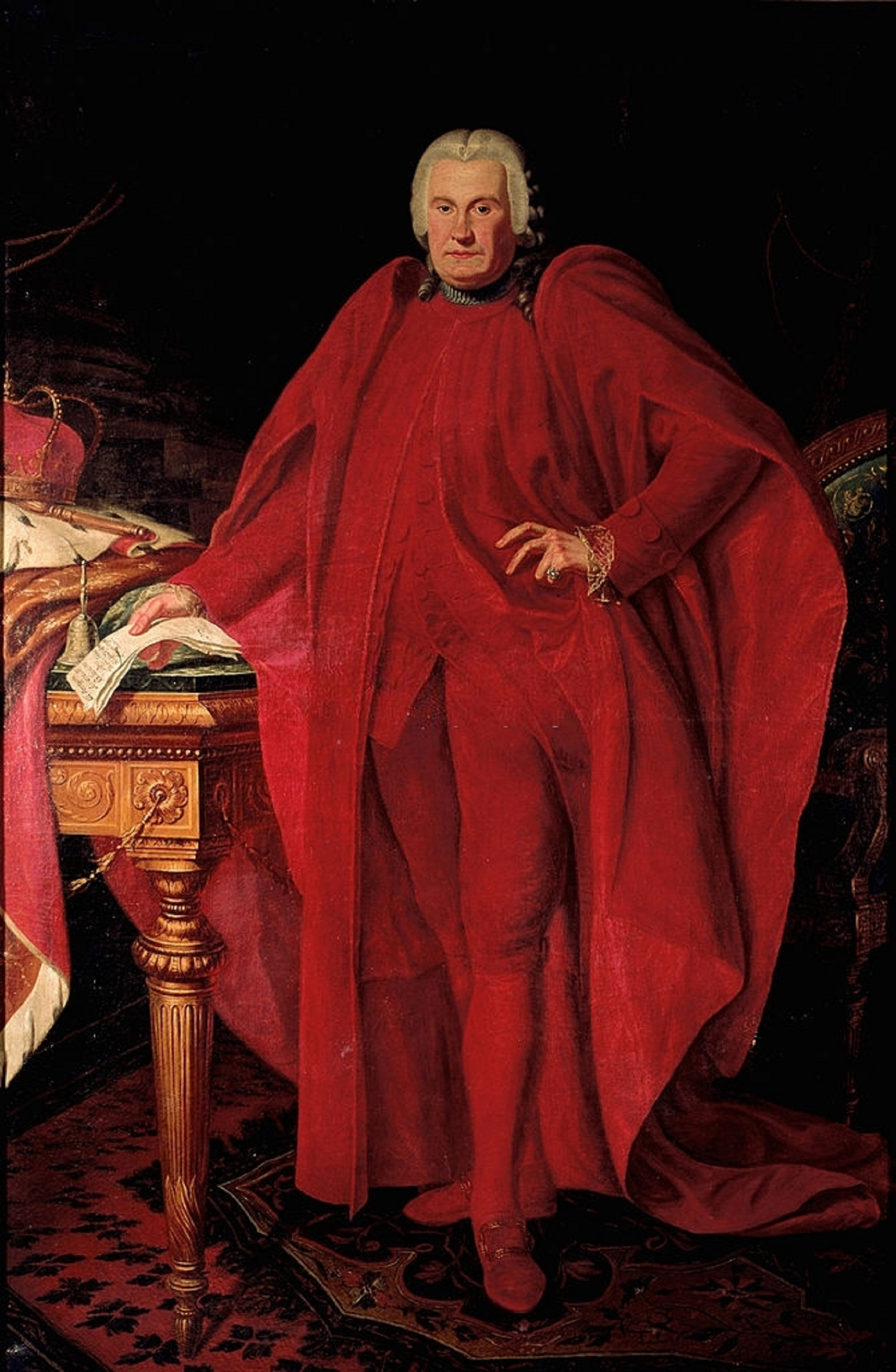

181st Doge of the Republic of Genoa
- In office 30 July 1789 – 30 July 1791
- Preceded by: Raffaele Agostino De Ferrari
- Succeeded by: Michelangelo Cambiaso

Personal details
- Born: 30 September 1730 Genoa, Republic of Genoa
- Died: 30 December 1805 (aged 75) Genoa, First French Empire

Alerame Maria Pallavicini (also called Alderame) (30 September 1730 - 30 December 1805) was the 181st Doge of his native Republic of Genoa.

== Biography ==
Pallavicini studied jurisprudence, theology, and philosophy at the Collegio Clementino in Rome, and by age 25, he had entered the ruling council, filling various positions in the Genoese government, including governor of Polcevera and three times as Senator. He rose to dogal power with the elections of the Major and Minor Council of 30 July 1789, the one hundred and thirty-sixth in two-year succession and the one hundred and eighty-first in republican history. His Dogate was marked by the management of new disputes related to the borders with the Duchy of Savoy and, again, as "observer" of the first revolutionary echoes from neighboring France. Other important facts during the mandate of Doge Pallavicini are the minting of new silver and gold coins; the purchase of a new English frigate to counter pirate assaults by the "Compagnia del Soccorso" and the donation of an Arab horse to the doge by the Bey of Constantine. He ended his term on 30 July 1791. Napoleon tried to cultivate the statesman by granting him the French Legion of Honor. Pallavicini presumably died in Genoa during 1805.

== See also ==
- Republic of Genoa
- Doge of Genoa
- Pallavicini family
