= Domenico Negrone =

Doge of the Republic of Genoa

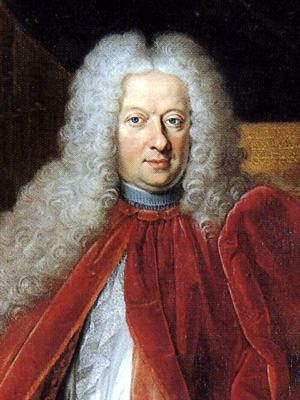

147th Doge of the Republic of Genoa
- In office October 13, 1723 – October 13, 1725
- Preceded by: Cesare De Franchi Toso
- Succeeded by: Gerolamo Veneroso

Personal details
- Born: 1672 Genoa, Republic of Genoa
- Died: 1736 (aged 63–64) Genoa, Republic of Genoa

Domenico Negrone (Genoa, 1672 - Genoa, 1736) was the 147th Doge of the Republic of Genoa and king of Corsica.

== Biography ==
Negrone's election as doge of the Republic of Genoa took place on 13 October 1723, the one hundred and second in two-year succession and the one hundred and forty-seventh in republican history. As doge he was also invested with the related biennial office of king of Corsica. In his mandate the doge Negrone decreed a 10% increase in taxes on goods coming from the Grand Duchy of Tuscany, a measure already implemented during the slate of the predecessor Cesare De Franchi Toso which already caused a collapse of commercial traffic and which, in a tight turn, was consequently canceled. He ended the Dogate on October 13, 1725, but continued to serve the republic in other public jobs. Negrone died in Genoa in 1736.

== See also ==
- Republic of Genoa
- Doge of Genoa
