= Antonio Grimaldi =

Doge of the Republic of Genoa and king of Corsica (1640–1717)

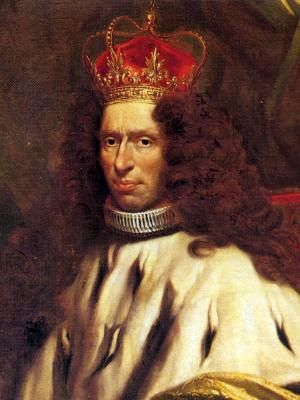

137th Doge of the Republic of Genoa
- In office 1 August 1703 – 1 August 1705
- Preceded by: Federico De Franchi Toso
- Succeeded by: Stefano Onorato Ferretti

Personal details
- Born: 1640 Genoa, Republic of Genoa
- Died: 1717 (aged 76–77) Genoa, Republic of Genoa

Antonio Grimaldi (1640–1717) was the 137th doge of the Republic of Genoa and king of Corsica.

== Biography ==
He was elected by the Grand Council of 1 August 1703, the ninety-second doge of the Republic of Genoa in two-year succession and the one hundred and thirty-seventh in republican history. As doge he was also invested with the related biennial office of king of Corsica. After the dogate ended on 1 August 1705, Antonio Grimaldi continued to serve the Genoese state. He died in Genoa during 1717 without ever marrying and without children.

== See also ==
- Republic of Genoa
- Doge of Genoa
- House of Grimaldi

== Sources ==
- Buonadonna, Sergio. Rosso doge. I dogi della Repubblica di Genova dal 1339 al 1797.
