= Francesco Maria Balbi =

Doge of the Republic of Genoa and king of Corsica

150th Doge of the Republic of Genoa
- In office January 20, 1730 – January 20, 1732
- Preceded by: Luca Grimaldi
- Succeeded by: Domenico Maria Spinola

Personal details
- Born: January 11, 1671 Genoa, Republic of Genoa
- Died: January 16, 1747 (aged 76) Genoa, Republic of Genoa

Francesco Maria Balbi (11 January 1671 - 16 January 1747) was the 150th Doge of the Republic of Genoa and king of Corsica.

== Biography ==
The election of the Grand Council of 20 January 1730 brought Francesco Maria Balbi to the highest office of the state, the one hundred and fifth Doge of Genoa in biennial succession and the one hundred and fiftieth in republican history. As doge he was also invested with the related biennial office of king of Corsica. And his two-year mandate was mostly focused, like his predecessors, in managing the various unrest that broke out on the island of Corsica. Once the Dogate ceased from 20 January 1732, he still held various public positions in the maritime offices, among the Inquisitors of State and reviser of the Chalices. Balbi died in Genoa on January 16, 1747.

== See also ==
- Republic of Genoa
- Doge of Genoa
