= Giafferi =

Giafferi is an Italian surname. Notable people with the surname include:

- Luiggi Giafferi (1668–1748), Prime Minister of the Kingdom of Corsica
- Vincent de Moro-Giafferi (1878–1956), French criminal attorney
