= Savona =

Seaport in Liguria, Italy

Savona Saña (Ligurian)
- Comune
- Comune di Savona
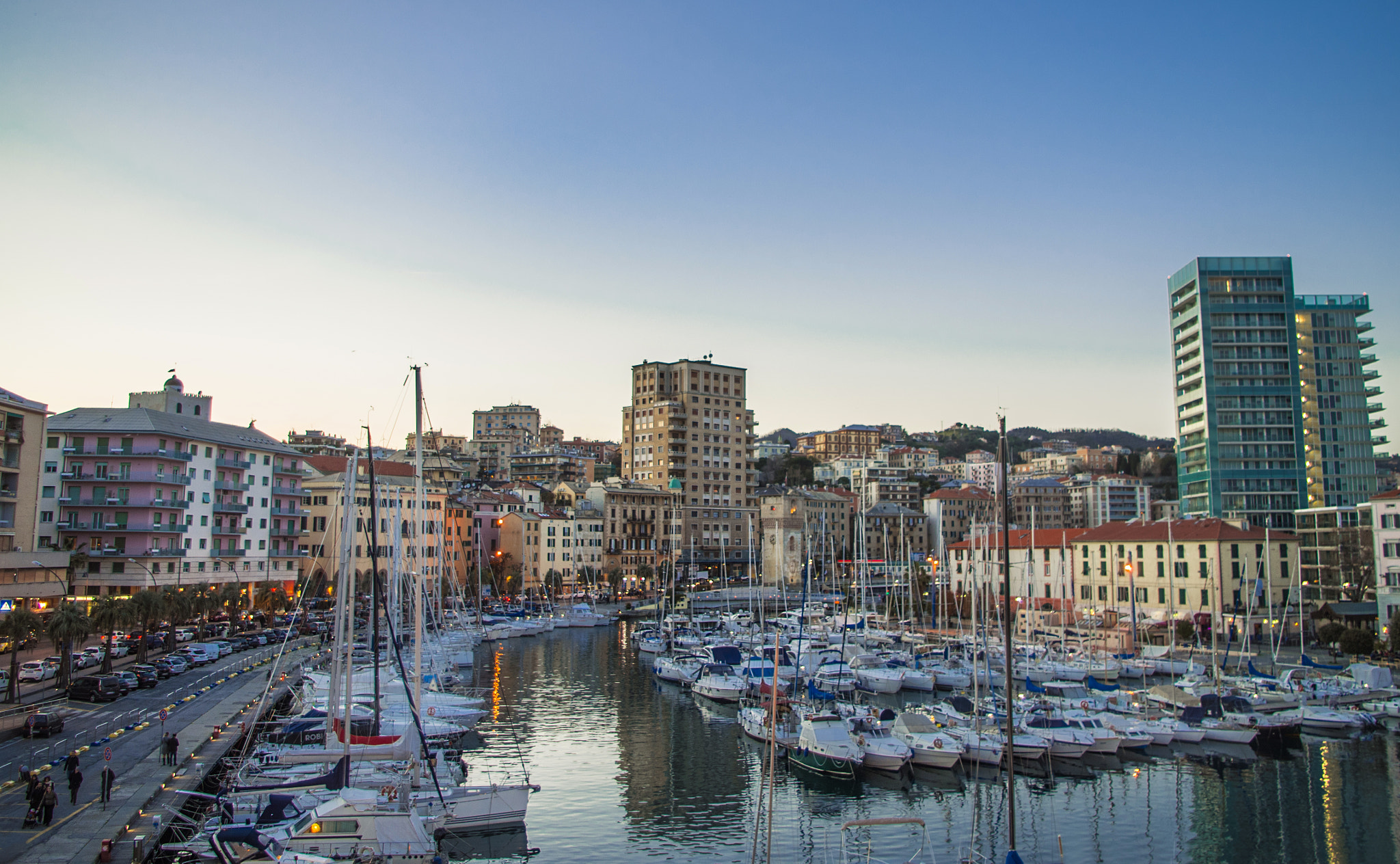
- Panorama of Savona

- Flag Coat of arms

- Location within Italy Location within Liguria
- Coordinates: 44°18′29″N 08°28′52″E
- Country: Italy
- Region: Liguria
- Province: Savona (SV)
- Frazioni: Bosco delle Ninfe, Ciantagalletto, Ciatti, Cimavalle, ConcaVerde, Galleria Ranco, Madonna del Monte, Maschio, Montemoro, Naso di Gatto, San Bartolomeo al Bosco, San Bernardo in Valle, Santuario

Government
  - Mayor: Marco Russo (PD)

Area
  - Total: 65.32 km^{2} (25.22 sq mi)
- Elevation: 4 m (13 ft)

Population (2025)
  - Total: 58,690
  - Density: 898.5/km^{2} (2,327/sq mi)
- Demonym: Savonesi
- Time zone: UTC+1 (CET)
  - Summer (DST): UTC+2 (CEST)
- Postal code: 17100
- Dialing code: 019
- Patron saint: Our Lady of Mercy
- Saint day: 18 March
- Website: Official website

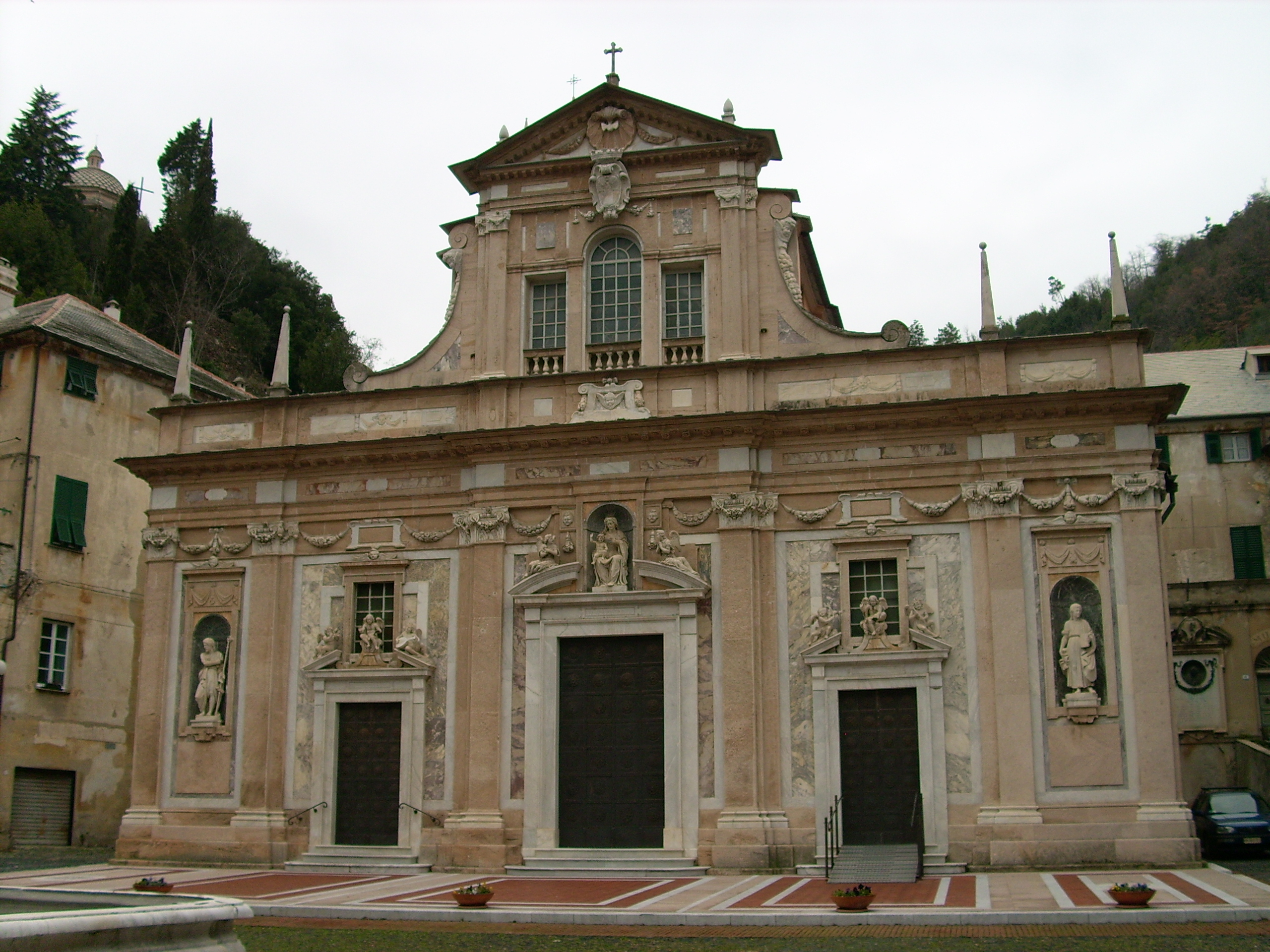
Sanctuary of Our Lady of Mercy.

Savona (Italian: [saˈvoːna]; Ligurian: Saña [ˈsaŋːa]) is a seaport and comune (municipality) in the west part of the northern Italian region of Liguria, and the capital of the Province of Savona. Facing the Ligurian Sea, Savona is the main city of the western section of the Italian Riviera. It has a population of 58,690.

One of the most celebrated former inhabitants of Savona was the navigator Christopher Columbus, who farmed land in the area while chronicling his journeys. 'Columbus's house', a cottage situated in the Savona hills, lay between vegetable crops and fruit trees. It is one of several residences in Liguria associated with Columbus.

== History ==
Inhabited in ancient times by Ligures tribes, it came under Roman influence in c. 180 BC, after the Punic Wars in which the city had been allied to Carthage. After the fall of the Western Roman Empire, it passed under Lombard rule in 641 AD (being destroyed in the attack), after a short period as an Ostrogoth and then Byzantine possession. Later it recovered as a county seat in the Carolingian Empire. In the 10th century, its bishops were Counts of Savona, but later the countship passed to the Marquesses of Montferrat (981) and afterwards to the Marquesses Del Vasto (1084).

After a long struggle against the Saracens, Savona acquired independence in the 11th century, becoming a free commune allied with the Holy Roman Emperor (similar to a free imperial city). Savona was the center of religious culture (13th to 16th centuries) due to the work of two important monasteries: Dominican and Franciscan. Subsequently, it fought against the Republic of Genoa before being definitively conquered in 1528. The Genoese destroyed the upper town and buried the port. It then shared the fortunes of the Republic of Genoa until Napoleonic times. In 1809, the city received Pope Pius VII, prisoner of Napoleon Bonaparte, for a few years. Between April and mid-May 1800, Austrian forces besieged the city while a small British naval force maintained a blockade; the fortress surrendered on 15 May. Subsequently, Savona was annexed to the Kingdom of Sardinia-Piedmont (1815). Eventually, it became part of the unified Kingdom of Italy, now a republic.

During the 20th century, Savona became a regional industrial hub.

== Geography ==
The town is situated 40 kilometres (25 miles) west of Genoa and circa 150 km (93 mi) (east) of Nice, in France, on the western Italian Riviera, between the Ligurian Sea and the Ligurian Alps.

=== Climate ===
Savona has a Mediterranean climate (Csa).

The average yearly temperature is around 19 °C (66 °F) during the day and 12 °C (54 °F) at night. In the coldest months: January, February and December, the average temperature is 11 °C (52 °F) during the day and 5 °C (41 °F) at night. In the warmest month – July and August – the average temperature is 28 °C (82 °F) during the day and 20 °C (68 °F) at night. Generally, a typical summer season lasts about 4 to 6 months, from May/June to September/October. The daily temperature range is limited, with an average range of about 7°C (13°F) between high and low temperatures. Rain occurs mainly in autumn, the summers being generally dry. Sunshine hours total above 2,097 per year, from an average 4 hours of sunshine duration per day in winter to average 9 hours in summer. Savona usually sees snow once or twice per year.

Climate data for Savona (1991–2012)
Month	Jan	Feb	Mar	Apr	May	Jun	Jul	Aug	Sep	Oct	Nov	Dec	Year
Mean daily maximum °C (°F)	11.6 (52.9)	12.8 (55.0)	15.4 (59.7)	18.2 (64.8)	22.7 (72.9)	26.3 (79.3)	28.6 (83.5)	28.7 (83.7)	25.6 (78.1)	20.4 (68.7)	15.6 (60.1)	12.4 (54.3)	19.9 (67.8)
Daily mean °C (°F)	8.9 (48.0)	9.8 (49.6)	12.4 (54.3)	15.0 (59.0)	19.4 (66.9)	22.9 (73.2)	25.1 (77.2)	25.5 (77.9)	22.3 (72.1)	17.6 (63.7)	12.9 (55.2)	9.7 (49.5)	16.8 (62.2)
Mean daily minimum °C (°F)	6.2 (43.2)	6.8 (44.2)	9.3 (48.7)	11.8 (53.2)	16.1 (61.0)	19.5 (67.1)	21.6 (70.9)	22.3 (72.1)	19.0 (66.2)	14.8 (58.6)	10.2 (50.4)	7.0 (44.6)	13.7 (56.7)
Average precipitation mm (inches)	74 (2.9)	79 (3.1)	94 (3.7)	66 (2.6)	71 (2.8)	41 (1.6)	20 (.8)	48 (1.9)	71 (2.8)	110 (4.2)	97 (3.8)	61 (2.4)	830 (32.6)
Source 1: Istituto Superiore per la Protezione e la Ricerca Ambientale (precipitation 1951–1980)
Source 2: Enea (precipitation 1961–1990)

== Demographics ==
Historical population
Year	Pop.	±%
1861	20,271	—
1871	24,802	+22.4%
1881	29,379	+18.5%
1901	38,645	+31.5%
1911	50,048	+29.5%
1921	58,573	+17.0%
1931	60,900	+4.0%
1936	64,195	+5.4%
1951	67,801	+5.6%
1961	72,110	+6.4%
1971	79,809	+10.7%
1981	75,353	−5.6%
1991	67,177	−10.9%
2001	59,907	−10.8%
2011	60,661	+1.3%
2021	58,534	−3.5%
Source: ISTAT

As of 2025, Savona has a population of 58,690, of whom 47.5% are male and 52.5% are female. Minors make up 13.0% of the population, and seniors make up 29.3%, compared to the Italian average of 14.9% and 24.7% respectively.

== Main sights ==
=== Churches ===
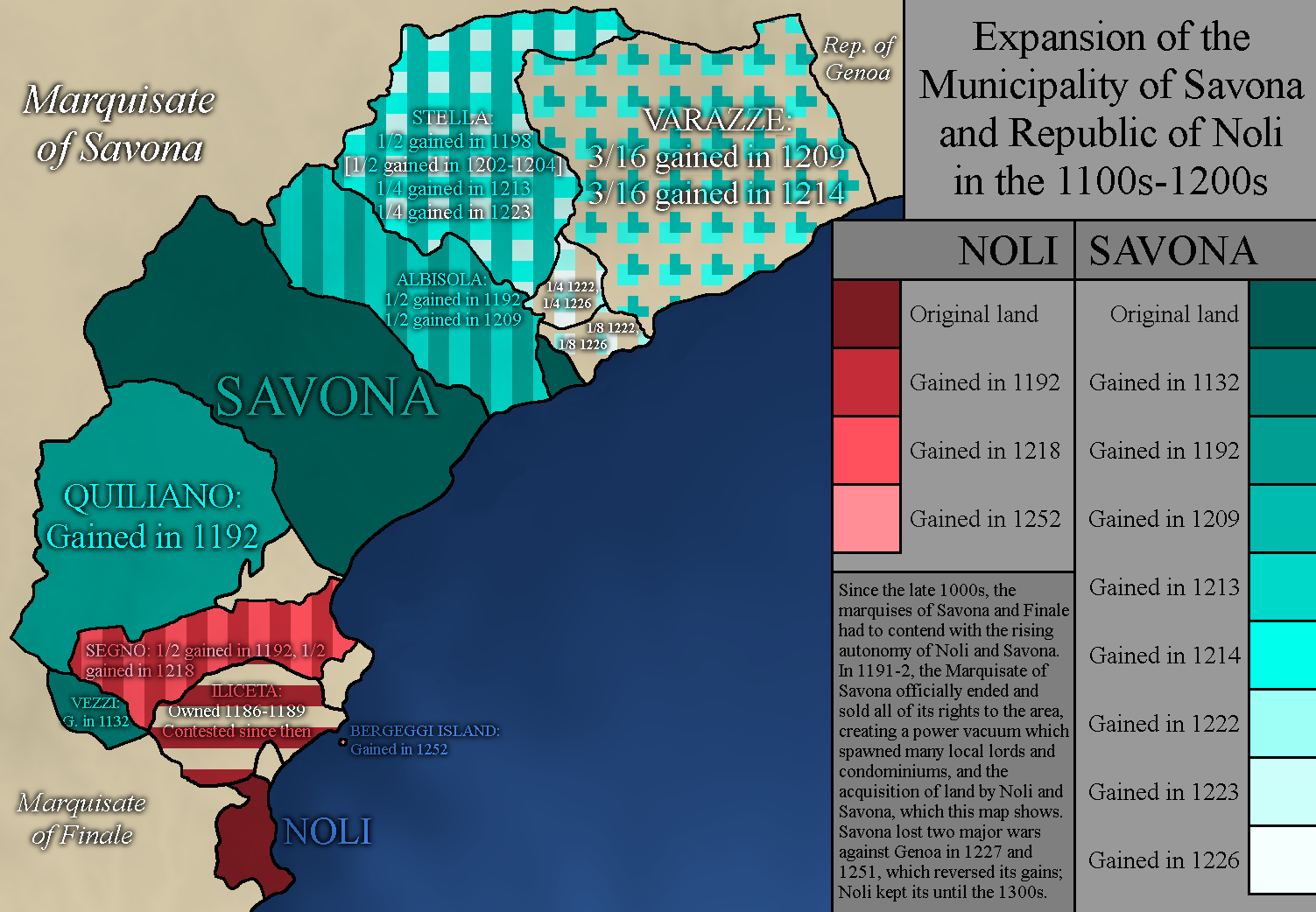
A map showing the expansion of the Municipality of Savona and Republic of Noli during the 1100s and 1200s. Sources are listed in the image's description.

- The Cattedrale dell'Assunta (Cathedral of the Assumption), built after Genoese demolition of the old cathedral. It kept the relics of Saint Valentine.
- The Cappella Sistina (Sistine Chapel), adjacent to the cathedral and built 1480–1483, it containing the Mausoleum erected by the Della Rovere Pope Sixtus IV to honor his parents, Leonardo Della Rovere and Luchina Monleone. The construction was commissioned by Giovanni D'Aria and his brother Michele. The chapel is architecturally similar to the chapel dedicated to the Cardinal Pietro Riario in the Basilica of the Santi Apostoli, Rome. After years of deterioration, in 1765–1767 a reconstruction was ordered by the Genovese Doge Francesco Maria Della Rovere. This updated the chapel in a Rococo style, with ceiling painted by Paolo Gerolamo Brusco. The cathedral has a noteworthy 16th-century carved wooden choir seats.
- The church of Nostra Signora di Castello (Our Lady of the Castle) has a large altarpiece by Vincenzo Foppa and Ludovico Brea painted in 1490.
- The Sanctuary of Nostra Signora della Misericordia (Our Lady of Mercy).

=== Towers and fortress ===
- The Torre Leon Pancaldo (Leon Pancaldo Tower), built in the 14th century and also known as "Torretta", is the symbol of the town.
- The Torre del Brandale (Brandale Tower), also known as Campanassa (Commune tower, where the freedom declaration of Savona was signed in 1191) and towers Corsi and Riario.
- The Priamar fortress, built by the Genoese in 1542 after their conquest of Savona, on the area of the old cathedral and old city and later used as a prison and military prison. In 1830–1831, Giuseppe Mazzini was imprisoned in the fortress and he "dreams" the "Giovine Italia". Inside the fortress there is the Museum Centre of Priamar.

=== Palaces and others ===
- The Palazzo Della Rovere (Della Rovere Palace), built by Cardinal Giulio della Rovere (future Pope Julius II) and designed by Giuliano da Sangallo as a university.
- The Palazzo Gavotti (Gavotti Palace), built in the 15th century. Inside the palace there is the Art Museum of Palazzo Gavotti that contains the Pinacoteca of Savona, the artwork of Fondazione Museo di Arte Contemporanea Milena Milani in memoria di Carlo Cardazzo and the Ceramic Museum.
- The Palazzo Delle Piane (Delle Piane Palace), an important building in Liberty style of Savona.
- The Villa Zanelli, an important Liberty-style former residence and hospital.
- In neighbourhood of Savona remains a house documented as property of Domenico Colombo, father of Christopher Columbus, where they lived for many years (Christopher Columbus lived in Savona for much of his youth).
- The War Memorial, with a marble base and bronze figures, was created by sculptor Luigi Venzano. It was inaugurated on 18 September 1927 and since then every day at 18:00 in Piazza Goffredo Mameli the fallen of all wars are commemorated with 21 tolls of the bell, one for each letter of the Italian alphabet: during the tolling traffic and pedestrians stop as a sign of respect.

=== Gardens ===
- Nemo's Garden is an underwater cultivation project based in nearby Noli, born to face main global issues, such as climate change, pollution, malnourishment and hunger.

== Events ==
- The Carnival, with a parade in the centre of the town, the typical costume of Savona is Cicciulin.
- The Patron saint's festival of Nostra Signora della Misericordia, on 18 March.
- The Holy Friday, with a spectacular procession in streets of the city which takes place every two years.
- The Santa Lucia fair in the central street of Via Paleocapa on 13 December.
- The Confuoco (in local dialect U Confeugu), it takes place the last Sunday before Christmas in the square of Sisto IV.

== Sport ==
Rari Nantes Savona is an aquatic sports club, mainly known for its professional men's water polo team, which competes uninterruptedly in the Serie A1, the top division of Italian championship, since 1982; the team has been national champion for three times.

Savona FBC is the local association football club, based at the Valerio Bacigalupo Stadium (named after Valerio Bacigalupo). The majority of their history they have oscillated between Serie C and Serie D.

== People ==
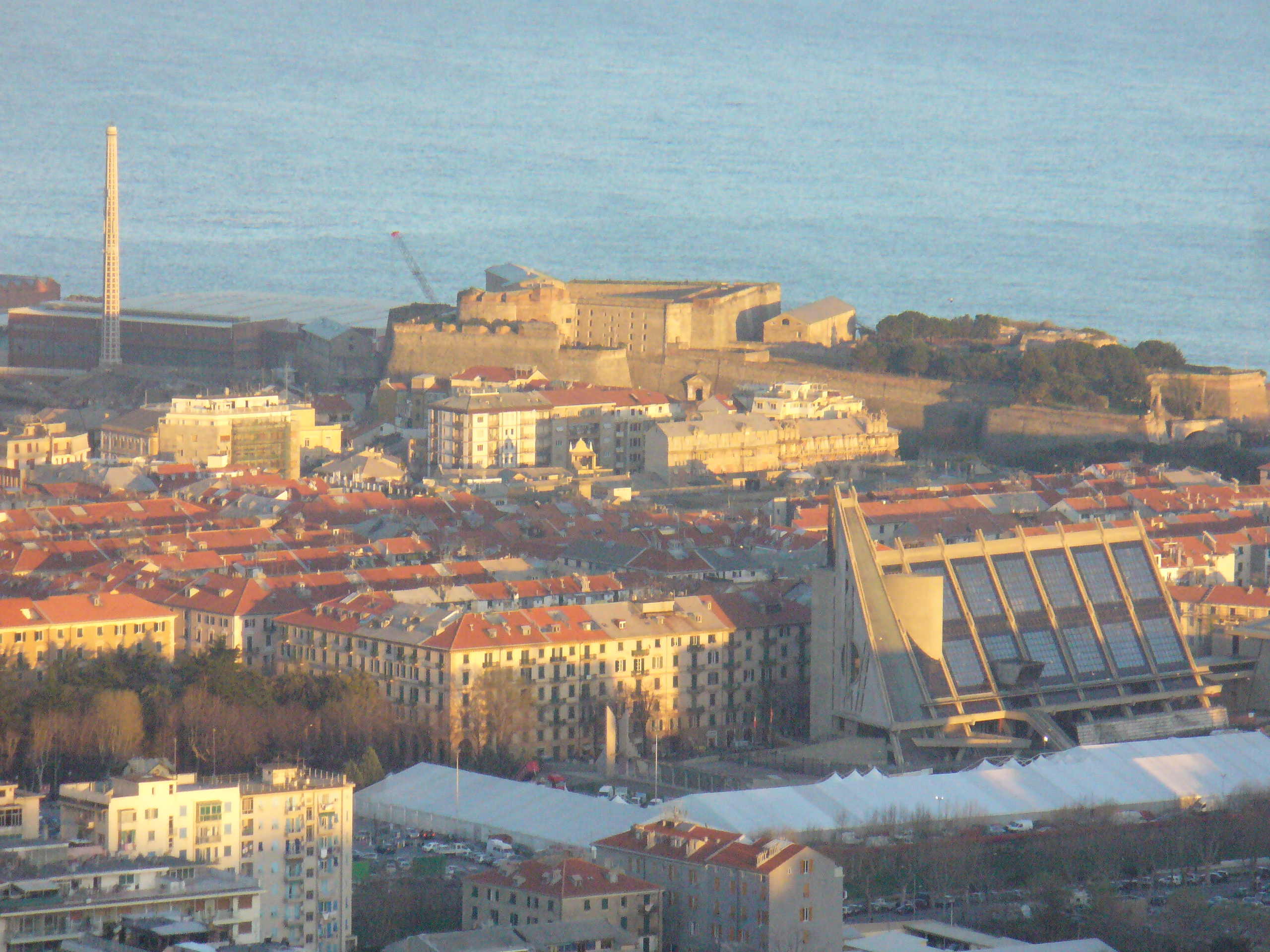
Panorama of Savona and Priamar fortress.

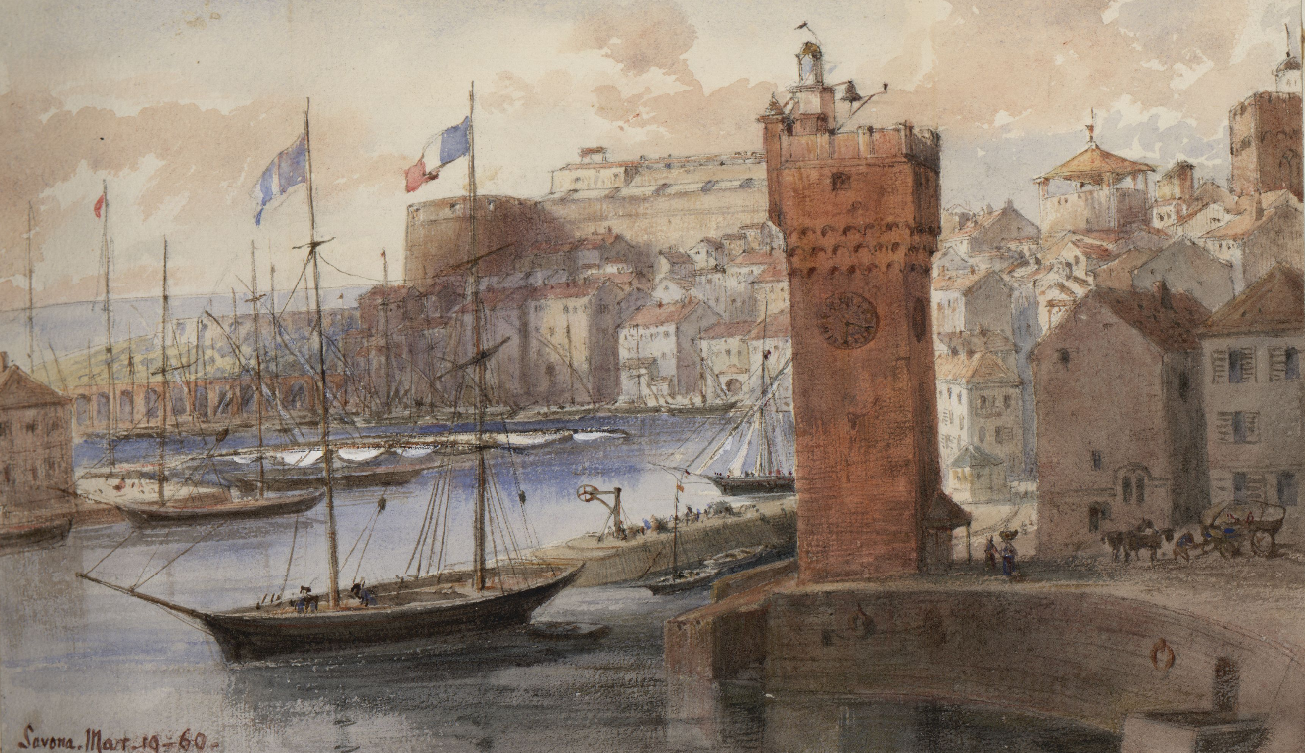
Savona, painted by a 19th-century tourist, 1860.

- Davide Biale (born 5 April 1994), YouTube personality and bassist
- Paolo Boselli (1838–1932), Prime Minister of Italy during World War I
- Gianni Baget Bozzo (1925–2009), priest and politician
- Susanna Bonfiglio (born 1974), basketball player
- Giacomo Boselli (1744–1808), Rococo-period sculptor of ceramics
- Elenoire Casalegno (born 1976), actress and TV host
- Luis Fernando Centi (born 1976), footballer
- Gabriello Chiabrera (1552–1638), poet
- Christopher Columbus (c. 1450–1506), explorer
- Enrico Cucchi (1965–1996), footballer
- Federico De Caroli (born 1964), musician
- Renato Dossena (born 1987), footballer
- Giulia Dotta (born 1992), professional dancer
- Fabio Fazio (born 1964), TV host
- Giuseppe Ferrerio (1554–1610), Roman Catholic archbishop
- Luca Ferro (born 1978), footballer
- Nando Gazzolo (1928–2015), actor
- Orazio Grassi (1583–1654), astronomer
- Bartolomeo Guidobono (1654–1709), painter
- Domenico Guidobono (1668–1746), painter
- Pope Julius II (Albisola 1443–1513)
- Michele Marcolini (born 1975), footballer
- Maria Christina of Naples and Sicily (1779–1849), Queen of Sardinia, died in Savona
- Leon Pancaldo (1488 or 1490–1538), explorer
- Christian Panucci (born 1973), footballer
- Sandro Pertini (1896–1990) President of the Italian Republic
- Daniela Poggi (born 1956), actress
- Girolamo Riario (1443–1488), lord of Imola and Forlì and one of the plotters behind the 1478 Pazzi conspiracy
- Pietro Riario (1447–1474), cardinal and Papal diplomat
- Della Rovere noble family that flourished in the 15th century
- Annalisa Scarrone (born 1985), know simply as Annalisa, singer-songwriter
- Renata Scotto (1934–2023), opera singer
- Stephan El Shaarawy (born 1992), footballer
- Pope Sixtus IV (Pecorile 1414–1484)

== Twin towns and sister cities ==
Savona is twinned with:

- Villingen-Schwenningen, Germany
- Saona, Dominican Republic
- Bayamo, Cuba
- Mariupol, Ukraine

== See also ==
- Corale Alpina Savonese
- Savona Football Club
- Nemo's Garden (Noli)

== Sources ==
- Scovazzi, Italo; Filippo Noberasco. Storia di Savona, vicende di una vita bimillenaria (in Italian). Sabatelli.
