= Priamar Fortress =

Fortress in Liguria, northern Italy

Coordinates: 44°18′16″N 8°29′4″E

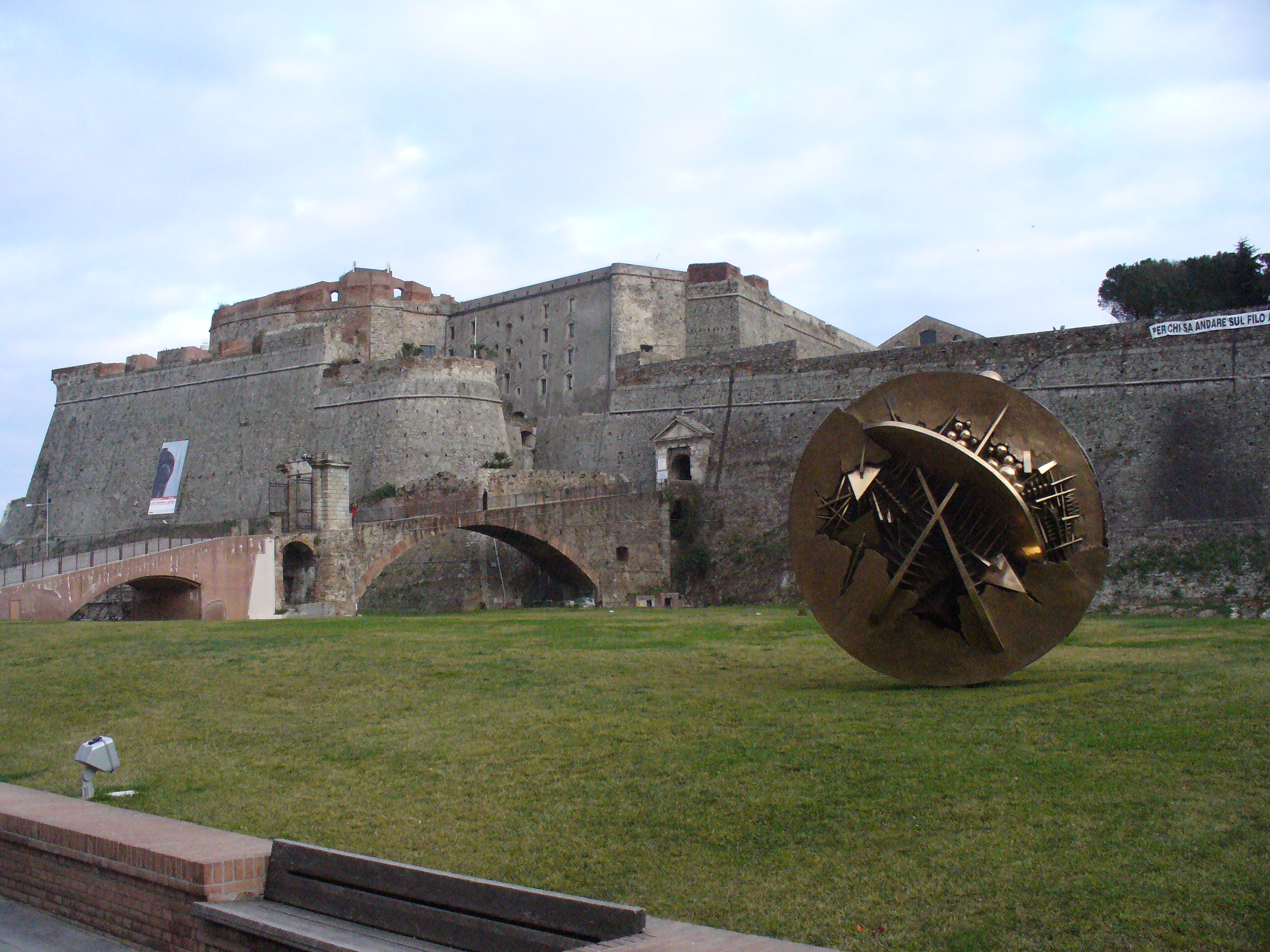
Priamar Fortess. In the foreground, a sculpture by Arnaldo Pomodoro

The Priamar Fortress (Italian: Fortezza del Priamar) is a fortress occupying the hill with the same name above the port of Savona, Liguria, northern Italy.

== History ==
Traces of pre-Roman, Roman and Byzantine presences in the site have been excavated in the past centuries, and are now on display in Savona's Archaeological Museum.

The cathedral of Santa Maria Maggiore (later renamed Santa Maria di Castello) was erected on the promontory between 825 and 887.

The fortress was built in 1542 by the Republic of Genoa on a promontory where in medieval times was the nucleus of Savona, by design of architect Giovanni Maria Olgiati.

In the 17th century the fortress received bastions designed by the Spanish Royal engineer Domenico Sirena, and in the 18th century were added the commissar's, officers' and Sibilla palaces. In order to create space for the new structures, edifices of the medieval Savona, including the cathedral Santa Maria di Castello (built in the 9th century over a pagan temple), were demolished.

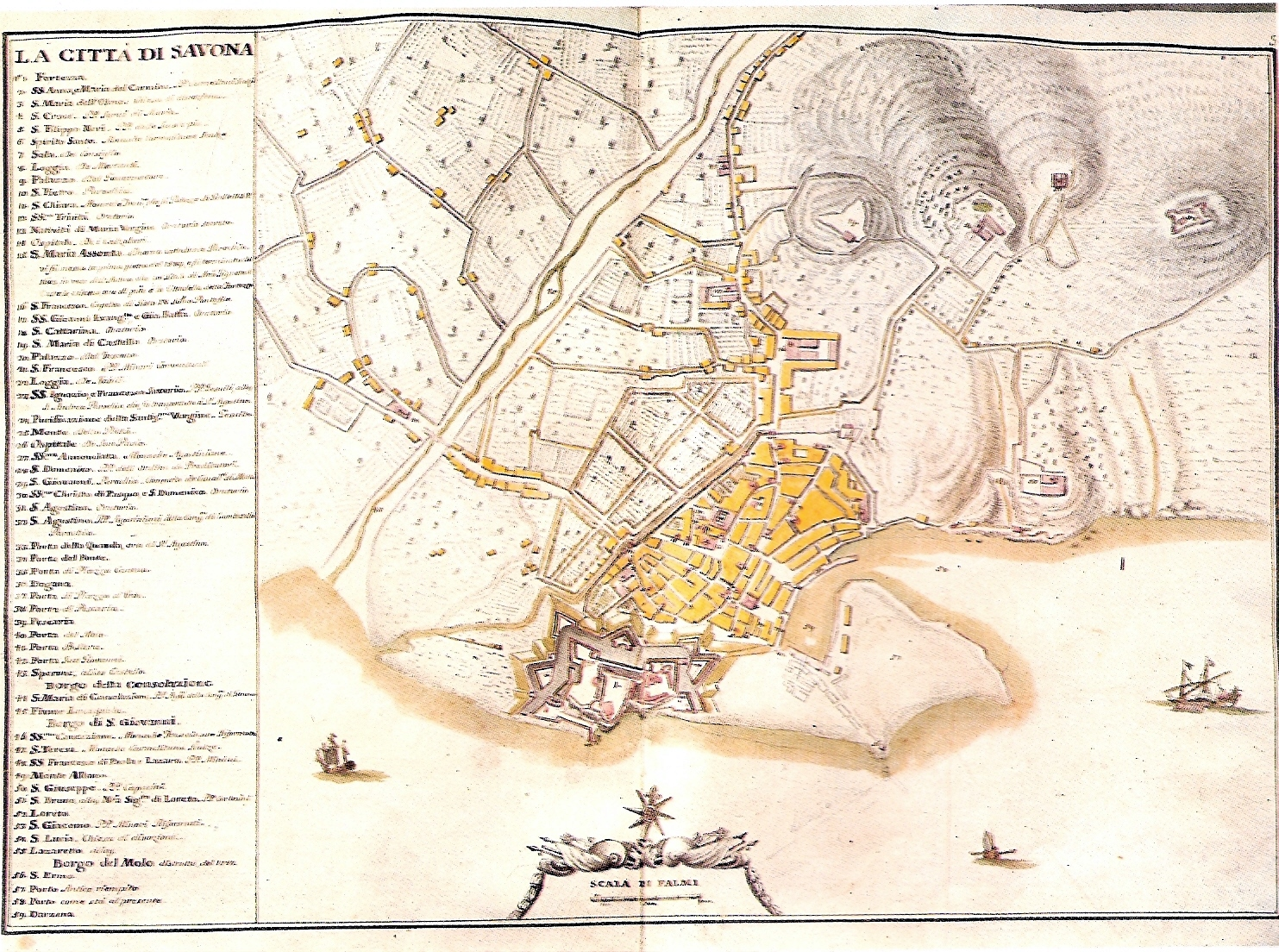
Map by Matteo Vinzoni (1773) showing Savona and the fortress.

In 1746, in the course of the War of Austrian Succession, it was stormed by the Piedmontese grenadiers. In 1820, after the annexation of Liguria to Piedmont, it became a prison. During the Risorgimento, Italian patriot Giuseppe Mazzini was jailed in the Priamar Fortress.

The fortress, which could house up to 500 prisoners, remained Italy's main military prison until 1903, when its role was taken by the castle of Gaeta.

After the outbreak of the coronavirus, the Fortress reopened to the public in June 2020. In January 2023, the front entrance portal was closed because of wall stones falling down.

== Description ==
The Civic Archaeological Museum and the Sandro Pertini and Renata Cuneo Museum are housed in the fortress' Palazzo degli Ufficiali. The Palazzo della Sibilla is a congress center. The Piazzale del Maschio contains a 600-seat theater. The square Piazzale del Maschio is the highest point of the Fortress, and the square Piazzale della Sibilla stands where the cathedral Santa Maria di Castello used to be erected.
