= Nemo's Garden (Noli) =

Biology research institution

- Interactive map of Nemo's Garden
- Type: Botanical
- Location: Noli, Italy
- Coordinates: 44.20122660471327°N 8.418236941683848°E
- Opened: 2012
- Owned by: Ocean Reef
- Operated by: Scuba Divers and Engineers
- Visitors: 100,000
- Plants: 150/200
- Species: 40
- Collections: Basil, Zucchini, Aromatic plants, Peas, Beans
- Budget: $2.3 million
- Website: www.nemosgarden.com

Nemo's Garden is an underwater cultivation designed by Sergio Gamberini along with a team from Ocean Reef Group in 2012, and currently coordinated by Gianni Fontanesi. The project was born to face main global issues, such as: climate change, pollution, malnourishment and hunger. It actively operates, and is open to visitors, from late June until late September.

The garden is located in Noli, Italy, and it consists in an underwater installation of several vinyl-plastic biospheres containing various kinds of herbs, vegetables and flowers that are being tested and observed for this alternative and sustainable way of gardening.

This concept of underwater agriculture exploits the sea, and the possibilities it offers, as its primary resource. It aims to be adaptable to the most hostile places on earth, where the lack of agricultural means causes poverty and hunger, and repopulate the reef in areas where pollution has destroyed it.

Nemo's Garden has the main goal of not harming the planet, consequently it was designed to be: self-sustainable, using mainly renewable energy from natural resources such as the sun and having the ability of reutilizing the freshwater it produces, eco-friendly, not harming the surrounding environment and its natural marine ecosystem that is heterogeneous, has an oligotrophic nature, a high diversity in marine species, and a high rate of endemism, and ecological, not producing any pollution.

The project is divided into two phases: the one going from 2012 until 2016, called "the 2016 phase", and the one being observed now. During the 2016 phase the objectives were: collecting data from the plants and analyzing their characteristics, designing and making the hydroponic system work, and taking into consideration the possibility of using the garden in cosmetic, pharmaceutical, and nutraceutical applications.

== Location ==
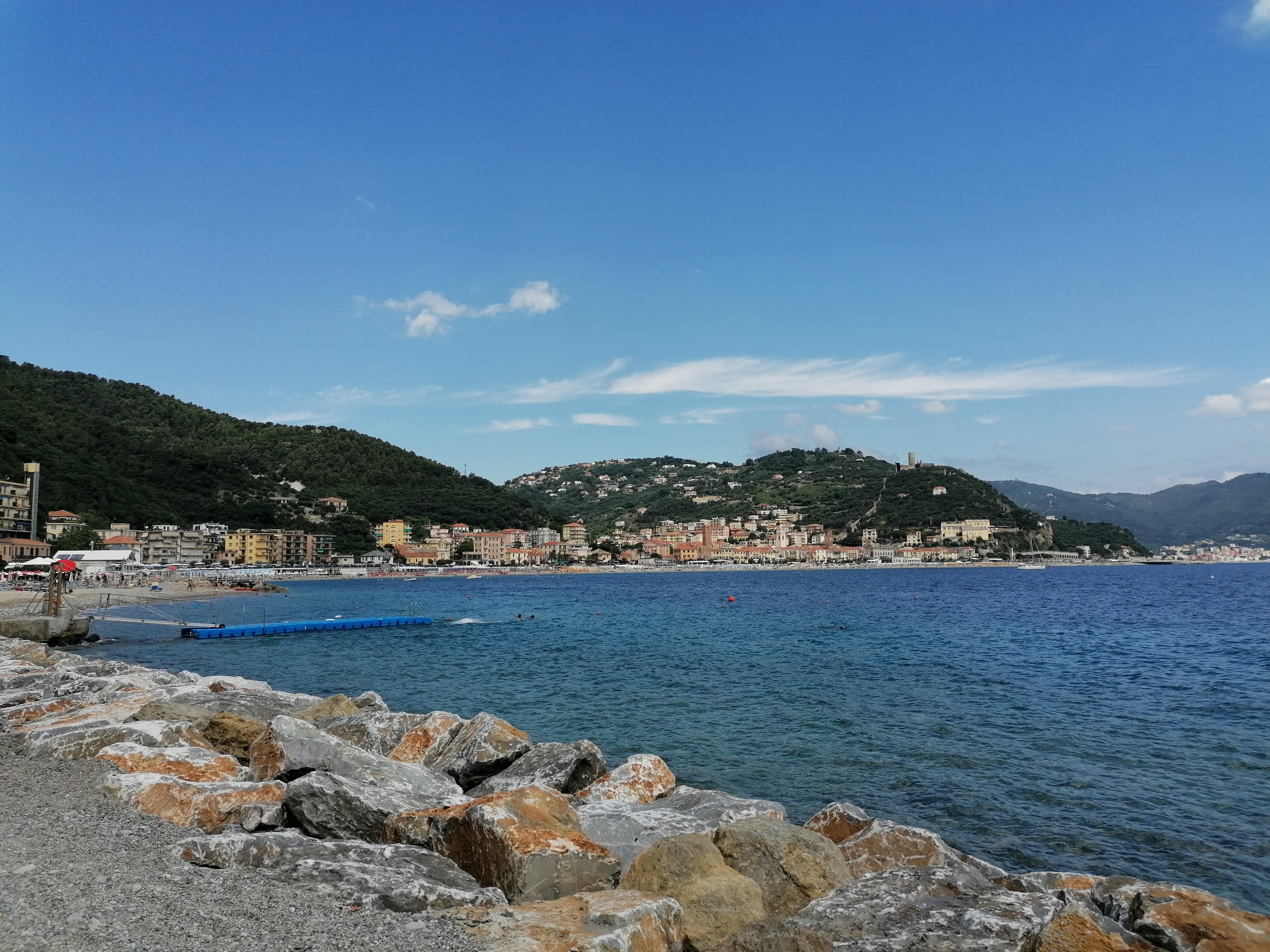
Town of Noli, view from Capo Noli

Nemo's Garden is located in a small inlet in the bay of Noli (in the Riviera di Ponente, Savona, Liguria). The length of the bay is almost 1 kilometre long. The underwater farm is placed about 40 m (130 ft) away from Letizia Beach, found between the cliff of Capo Noli and Punta Vescovato, and between 32 and 40 ft (9.8 and 12.2 m) under the sea level.

In Liguria the general depth of the sea varies from 6,500 feet (2,000 m) and 10,000 feet (3,000 m), but in the area of Noli the depth reaches a maximum of 3,200 feet (980 m).

The small village of Noli (Neapolis in Greek, means "new city"), is an Italian municipality placed on the west coast of Liguria. Historically speaking, from 1192 up until 1797, the time of the Napoleonic invasion, it was one of the maritime republics, called "Republic of Noli". The territory of this municipality is part of the Pollupice Mountain Community.

== History ==
In 2012, Sergio Gamberini, decided to combine his passions of gardening and scuba diving to create an underwater cultivation. With rising concerns about our planet's future he found this project could be a viable and safe alternative for modern agriculture, known to be one of the causes for the earth's conditions.

The plant he and the team decided to cultivate first was green basil, one of Liguria's regional symbols. In 2013 the basil plants were analyzed and it was discovered they had the same taste as the ones grown on land, but they contained 20% more of essential oils. The following year it was decided to build an additional biosphere where salad was the selected species of plant to cultivate.

In 2015 the project's team participated in the event Expo 2015, which helped publicize the garden and acquire new funds.

In 2016 the Tree of Life, the main exhibit from Expo 2015, was built in the garden as an homage to the event. The original structure of the Tree was designed by Creative Director Marco Balich and reaches an overall height of 37 metres. This piece of architecture represents the connection between past and future, united in one object, and becomes a metaphor for prosperity and hope. The creator claims his art piece is inspired by Michelangelo's flooring in Piazza del Campidoglio, Rome.

In 2018 some of the plants in the Garden were destroyed by Cyclone Zorbas, a storm that struck in the Mediterranean Sea. The structure of the biospheres was not damaged, but the high level of water in them resulted in the death of majority of the plants. Following this event, the team worked on restoring the habitat and rebuilding the biospheres to be more resistant.

Italy was one of the first countries to be affected by the COVID-19 pandemic. Divers were unable to collect new research data, and subsequently the team from Ocean Reef Group at Nemo's Garden was forced to take a break.

In the final months of 2020, Nemo's Garden made it through thunderstorms and the Winter season, which was registered as the most successful period in terms of plant growth.

== Design and working principles ==
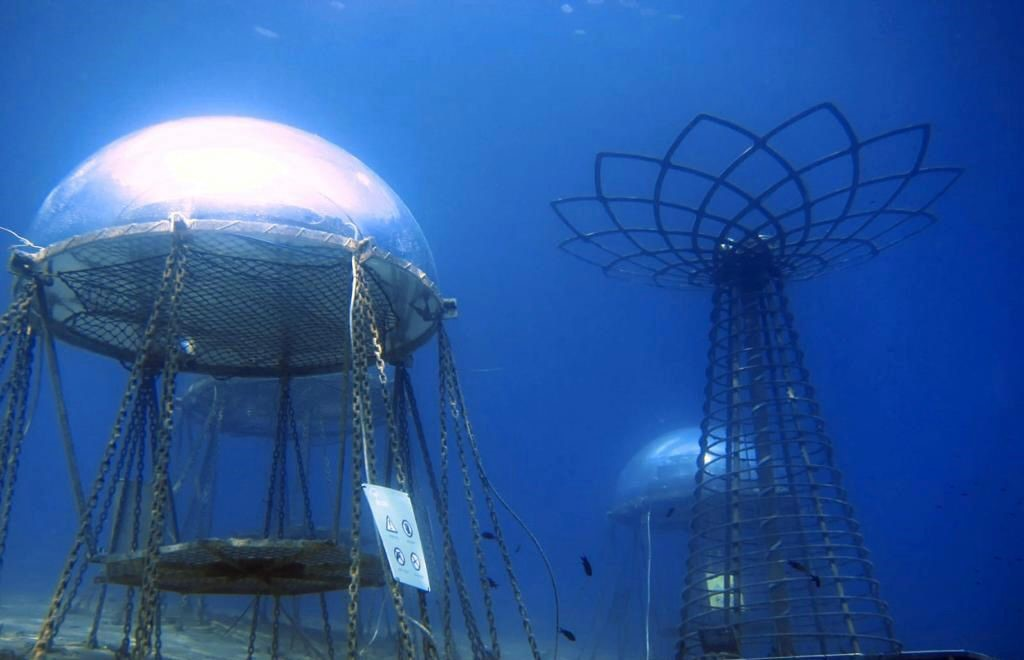
Tree of Life and Biospheres

Nemo's Garden is made up of a total of six biospheres. They are composed by a vinyl-plastic dome, that allows the sunlight to reach the plants inside, and an internal metallic scaffold that anchors the structure to the seabed through 24 chains and special screws. Each semi-sphere is filled with 2,000 litres (440 imp gal; 530 US gal) of air volume that is periodically refreshed, for a diameter of two metres (6 ft 7 in), and a step grid at the bottom where divers can stand to operate.

The Garden was originally structured in the shape of a pentagon with five biospheres, but a sixth one was added in 2021. The Tree of Life is a 3.5 metres (11 ft) high and 3 m (9.8 ft) large structure positioned in the middle. It hides cables going into the biospheres, provides illumination for the habitat, and has webcams monitoring the Garden from the top. Cameras are positioned in every biosphere and they work thanks to a wireless underwater communication network with a range of operation of 100 metres from the Tree of Life.

A Control Tower on the shoreline monitors and supervises all the activities in Nemo's Garden and it is used by the "agrinauts" (divers working in the biospheres) to communicate with their colleagues working on land.

This underwater farm uses a cultivation system called "Hydroponics", a method of growing plants using mineral solutions in water without soil. The solutions contain nutrients based on K+ ions and NO3- (Nitrate). Inside the plastic domes is installed a spiral tube 10 m (33 ft) long that has holes positioned every 15 cm (5.9 in) functioning as seedbeds, for a total of 60 holes in each biosphere and a total of 150 to 200 plants.

Every semi-sphere has monitoring sensors that detect and record physical and chemical data such as: air temperature, Humidity rate (controlled through fans powered by solar energy), luminosity, levels of oxygen and carbon dioxide.

The Garden is provided with an irrigation system situated in a tank in the lowest part of the spiral tube. The irrigation water is obtained thanks to the phenomenon of condensation caused by the difference between the air temperature inside of the biospheres and the surrounding water temperature. The water obtained is stored in the tanks and mixed with fertilizers and redistributed to the plants through a pump powered by solar energy that pushes the water from the bottom to the top of the spiral tube. The water then descends by gravity reaching the plants.

The main renewable energy source is solar energy and fresh water is obtained through the process of desalination of water. In absence of solar energy, LED lights are employed to provide light.

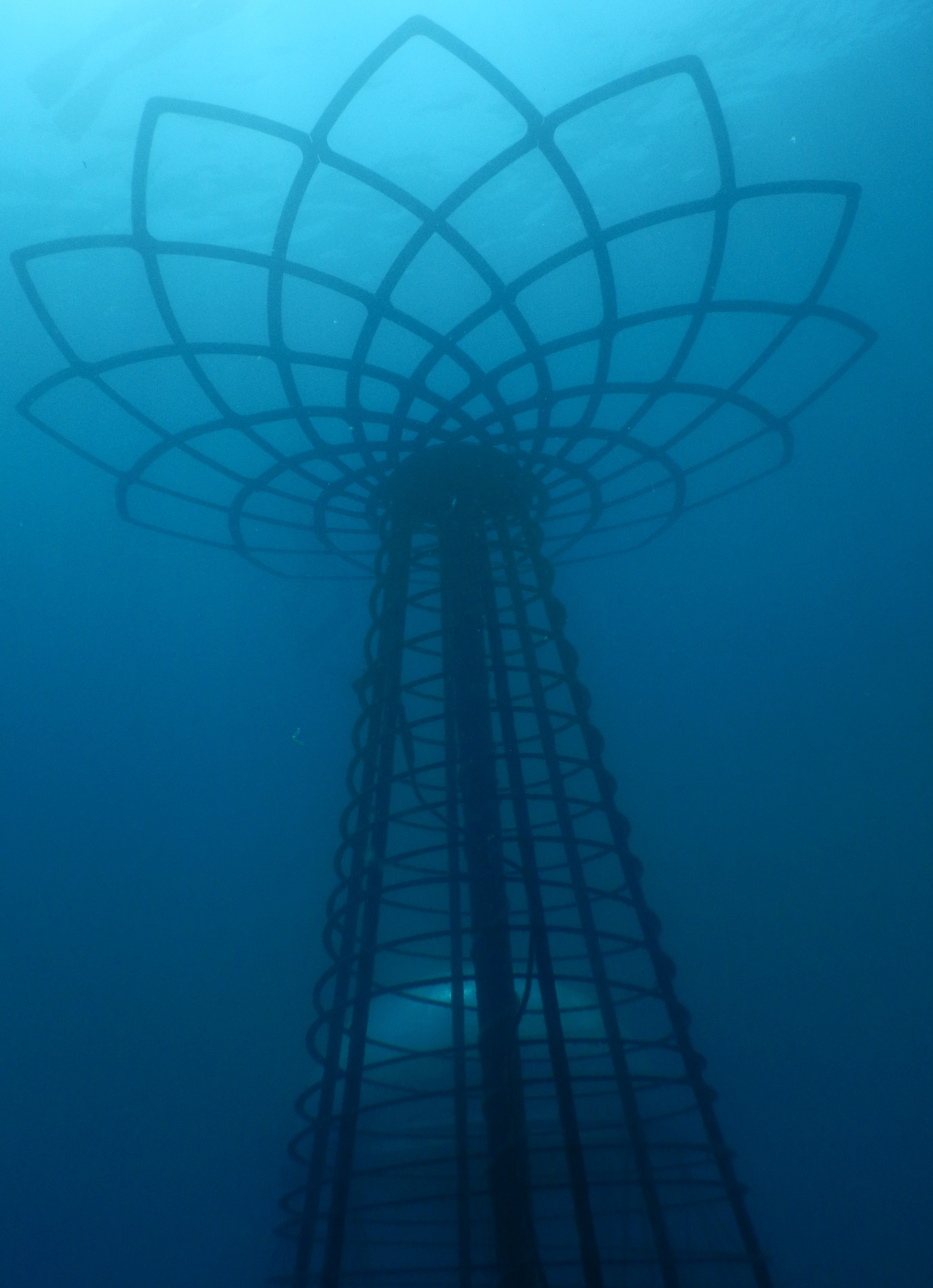
Tree of Life

The species of herbs, vegetables and flowers selected for the project are:Stevia rebaudiana, Salvia elegans, Eschscholzia californica, Vinca, Calendula, Pansy, Small Tomatoes, Lemon balm, Basil, Thyme, Orchids, Sophora, Goji, Oregano, Mentha and Beans. The aim is to observe how different plants can survive and grow in this kind of environment.

== Sustainability ==
One of the most significant systems for modern farming is industrial agriculture based on large-scale monoculture. This method takes into account the increasing importance of sustainability, but the many improvements in this branch, like plant breeding and the use of agrochemicals, have caused significant ecological damage and are known to have negative health effects on humans.

Water is the main resource for agriculture and its management is particularly important, especially in countries where rainfalls are insufficient or variable. In the last years, the availability of freshwater has started to decrease rising the public's concearn and opening the way to new possible more sustainable agricultural methods like the one used in Nemo's Garden.

Gamberini's new underwater system hopes to help overcome problems related to the use of harmful pesticides, known to damage both the fauna and the flora of the reef, but also human's health as these pesticides end up being in the food we eat. The closed ecosystem of the biospheres would disable the parasites to attack the plants to begin with. Moreover, the underwater farm does not pose a threat to marine ecosystems because of low interaction with the surrounding environment. It will be possible to produce natural fertilizers from algae growing in the areas surrounding the farms, and make the project completely sustainable.

The biospheres are made from non-toxic polymeric materials and have minimum interactions with the surroundings, so they could and are becoming the right habitat for small-sized marine animals. This is a phenomenon known as repopulation of the reef and it will eventually increase. As a result, the population of Noli's coastline has already increased by 150%.

In contrast to ordinary greenhouses, Nemo's Garden can maintain mild stable temperatures within its biospheres without extra thermoregulation, which leads to carbon dioxide emissions and greenhouse effect, two of the main issues regarding modern agriculture.

== Future projects ==
Nemo's Garden is a scientific project that tests how the underwater systems can remain diverse and productive infinitely. The research is focusing on the relationship between the time needed for the plants to grow underwater rather than on land, the depth at which the project could be installed for the plants' survival and the pros and cons of the different locations and materials.

The commercialization of fresh produce grown underwater is a possible application of the project. Public and private entities could use the farms for the production of food on a larger scale and sell it to the public, especially in third world countries to enlarge their economy.

The team at Nemo's Garden is expanding their research to adjust their general structure of the Garden in function of the environment it would be placed in. For example, exploiting of solar panels in desert areas.

Another future application of the project would be that of Ecotourism. This implies opening the installations up for the public, or even placing them in resorts, to help with the growth of tourism in certain areas and to spread awareness on climate change, pollution related to the current methods of agriculture, and other main issues tied to the time we are living in.

A phenomenon that is being observed in the Garden is the behaviour of sea animals around the biospheres, as many of them have started to inhabit the areas surrounding the domes. This led to the idea of using these cultivations also for fish farming, or for the growth of seaweed and corals to repopulate the reef that is lately been particularly affected by damaging activities such as chemical fishing or use of harmful pesticides and disastrous events, such as leaks of petroleum in the sea.

The team at Nemo's Garden is partnering up with scientists like Professor Giovanni Tanda and Professor Marco Fossa from the Engineering Group of the University of Genoa, for researches on thermal and hydrometrical issues caused by water evaporation in the biospheres, and Prof. Luisa Pistelli and Dr. Laura Pistelli from the University of Pisa for botanical studies, specifically the phytochemical composition of the plants, their aroma profile, their morphological structure, the histochemical features and their physiological behaviour compared to those grown on land.

== Scuba diving ==
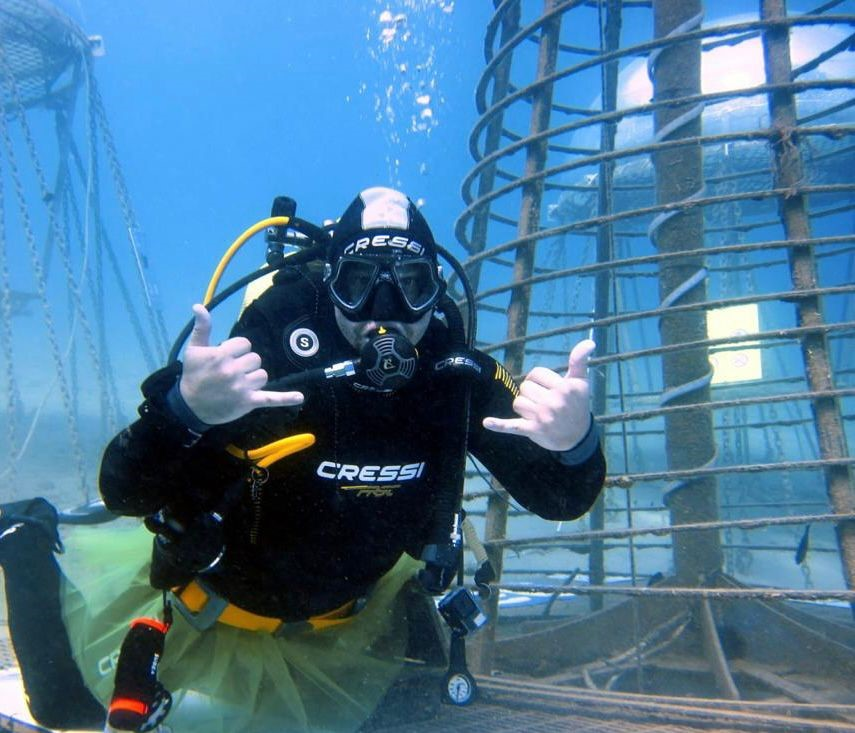
Diver working on Nemo's Garden

Scuba diving is an adventurous sport and before the COVID-19 pandemic struck, it was practiced in Italy by more than 100.000 people per year. After the pandemic only 20% of diving centres have registered no loss in profit, 60% has estimated a loss between 25 and 50% and the rest have had a loss of 50% or more. This emergency situation is expected to help the Italian scuba diving centres in the long run, especially for summer 2021–2022, as many Italian divers (50%) have decided to stay local, and explore the Italian coasts to save money and still be able to practice this sport.

Liguria is one of the main locations for scuba diving in Italy and between the main spots we can find: the area of the Cinque Terre, Portofino, the island of Bergeggi and Pelagos Sanctuary.

The team from Ocean's Reef Group at Nemo's Garden, along with Gamberini and Fontanesi, aim to make Liguria and its treasures more known to divers and tourists in general. They want to transform their farm in one of the top attractions and spots for scuba diving and tourism. The Garden is open to the public and it can be visited along with a guide.

== Gallery ==
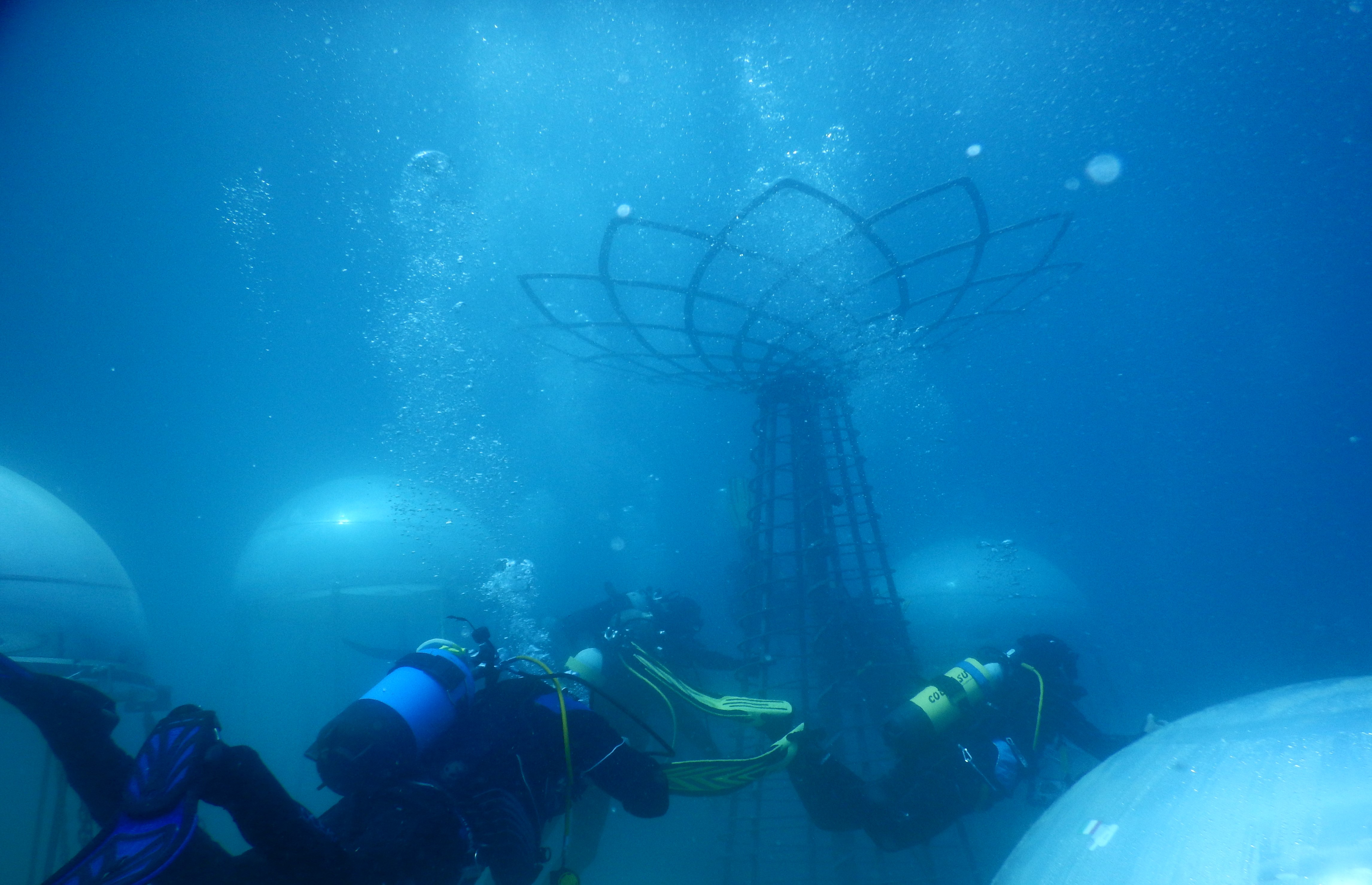
Divers entering a biosphere

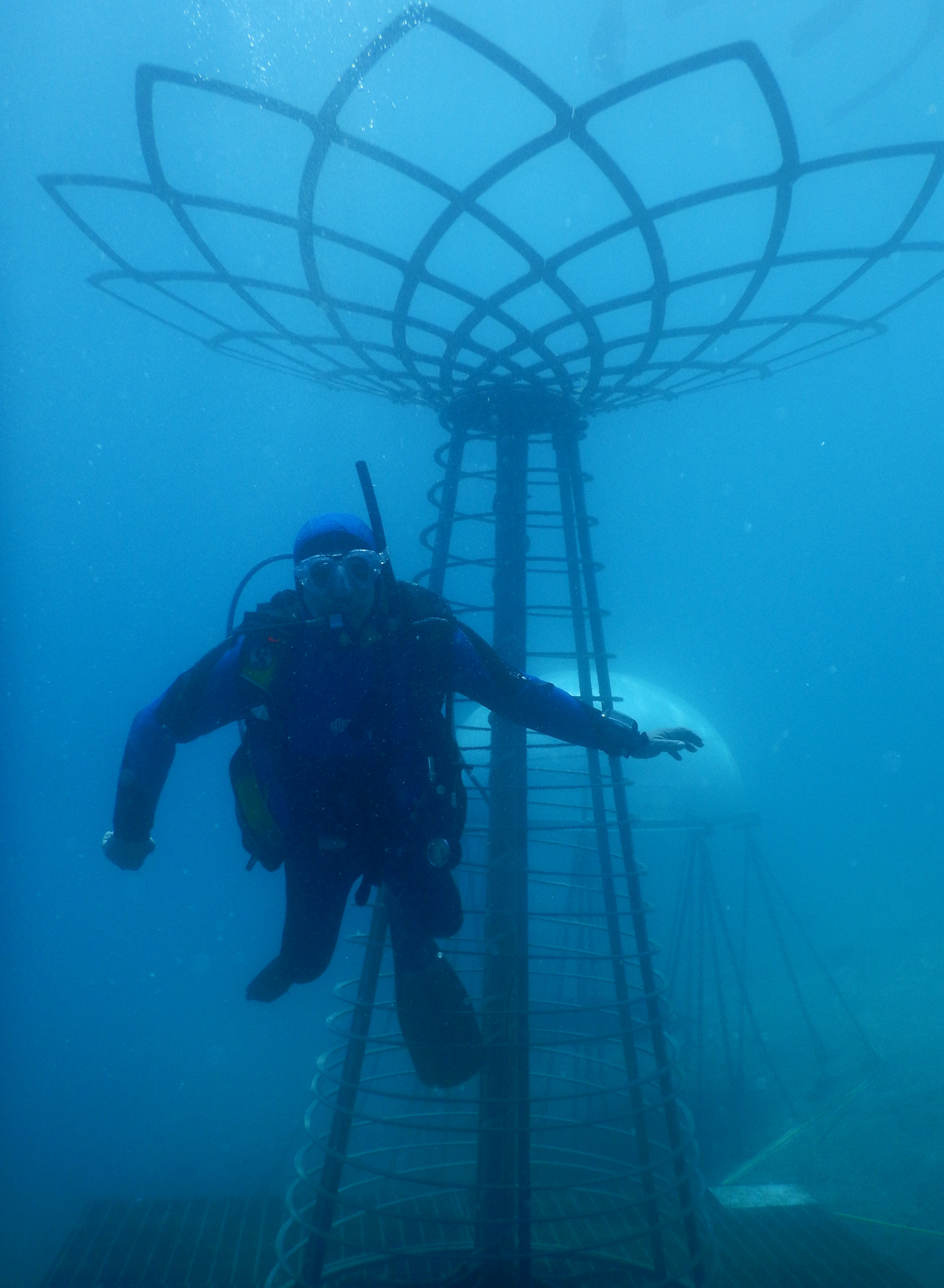
Diver in the forefront of the Tree of Life

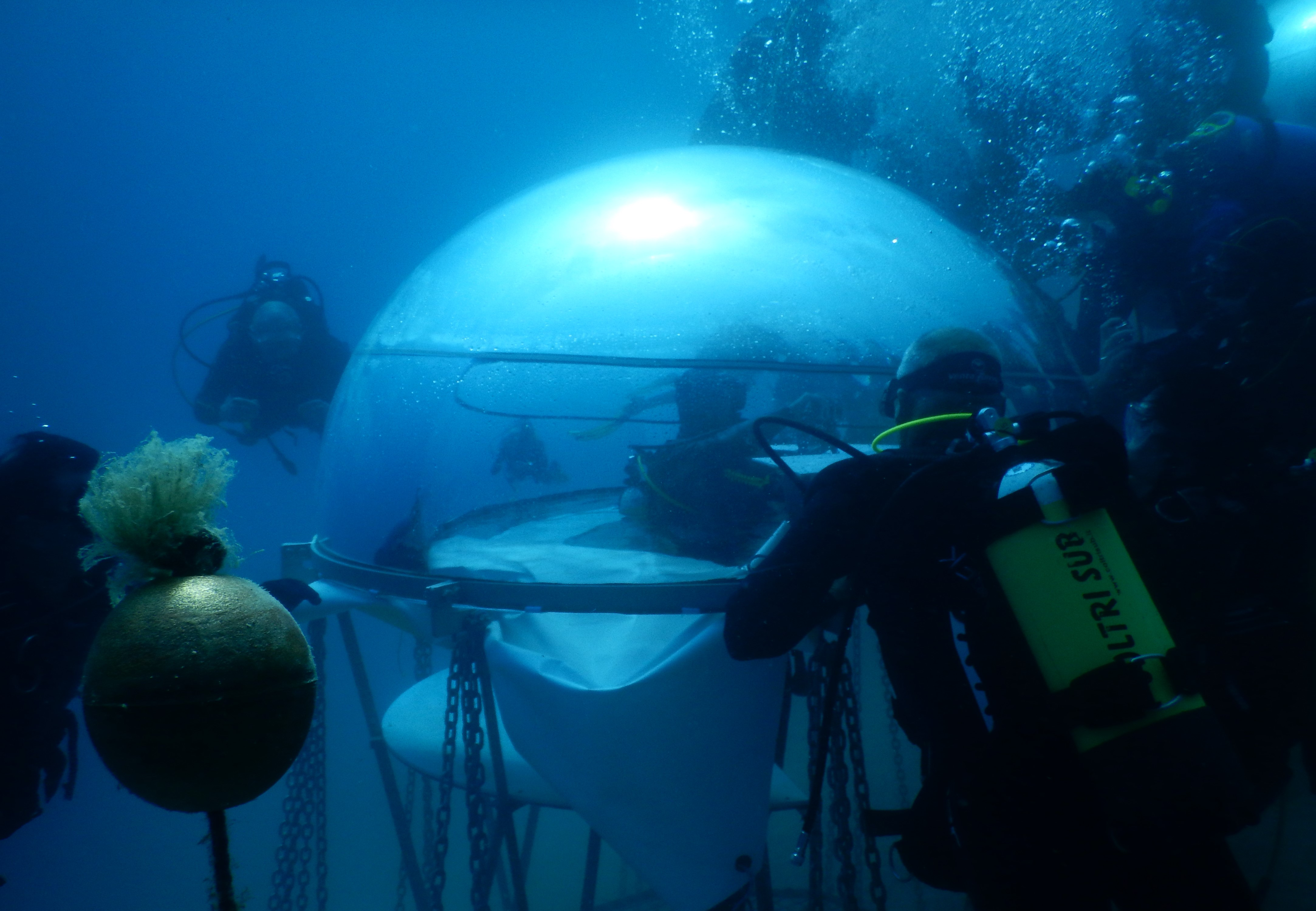
Close-up with a biosphere

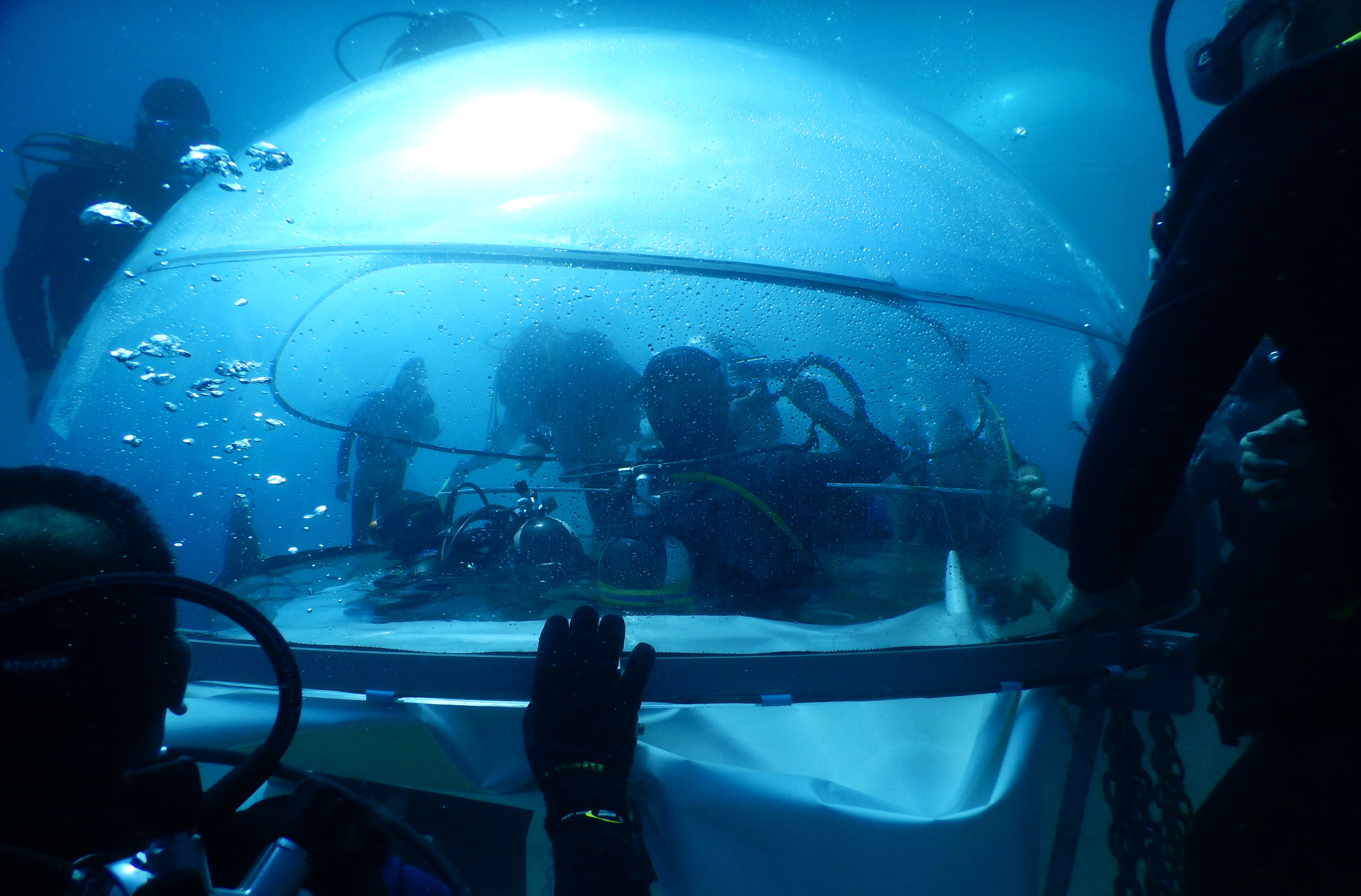
Biosphere analysis

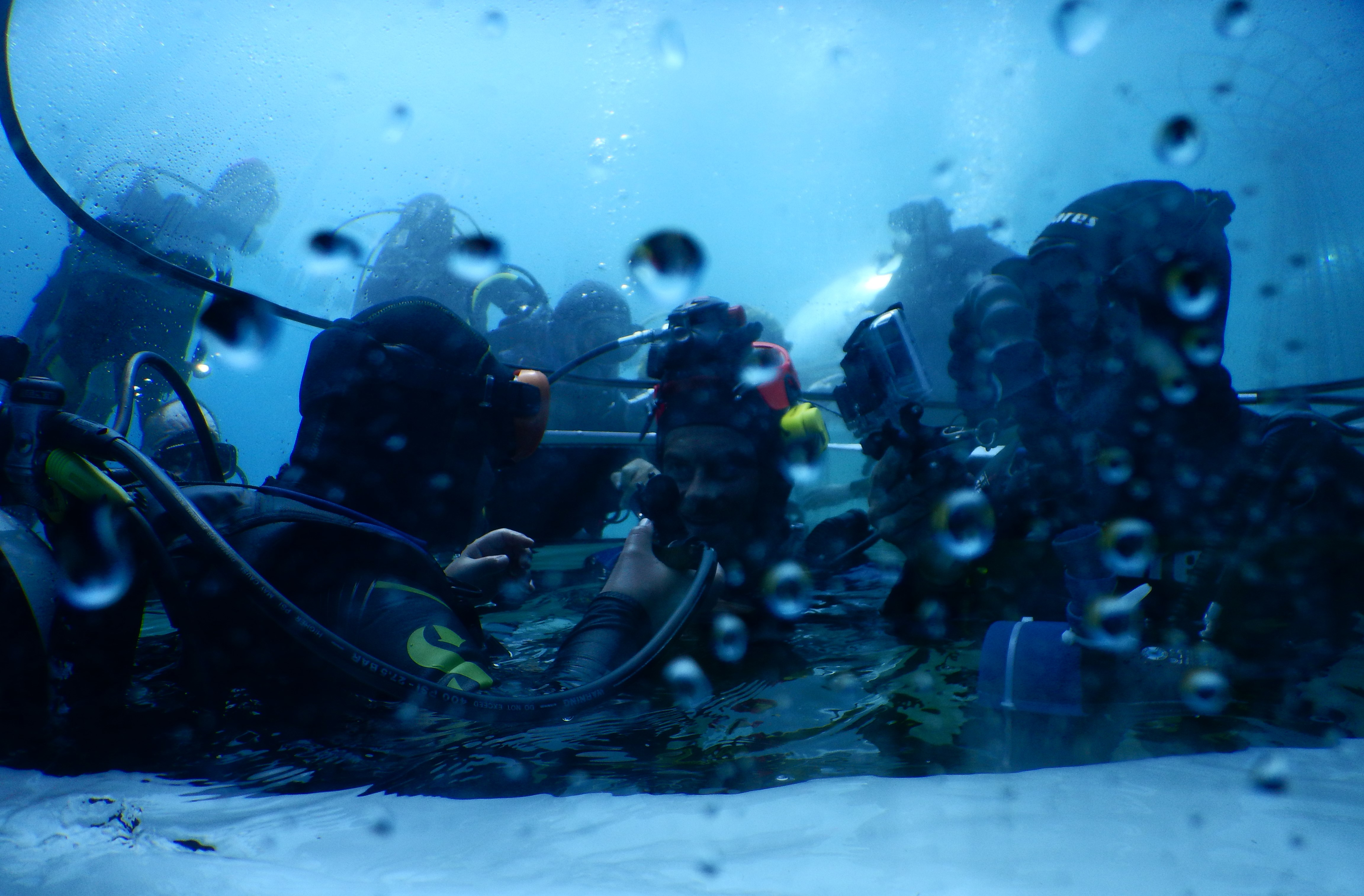
Inside a biosphere

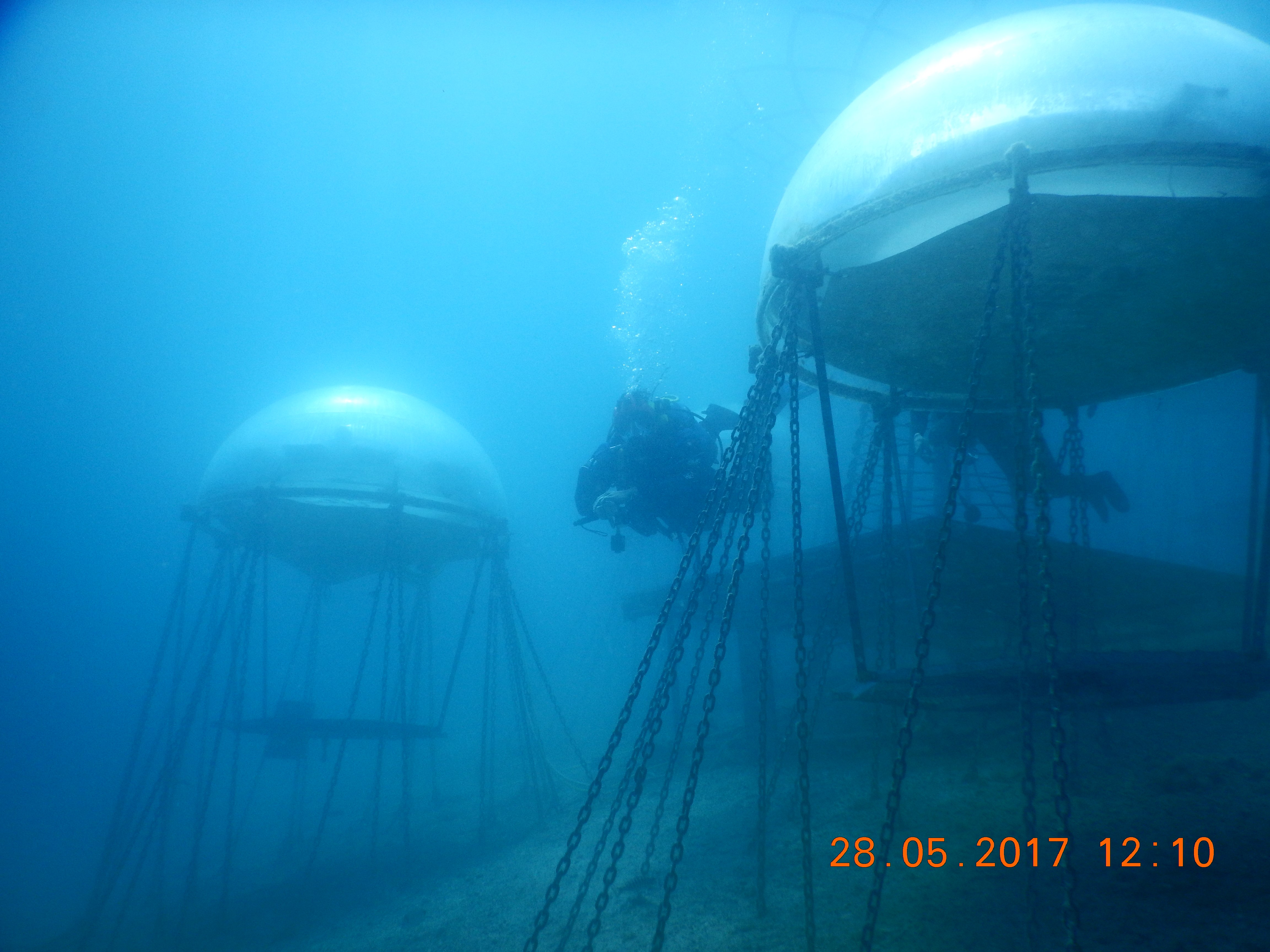
Down angle: Biospheres

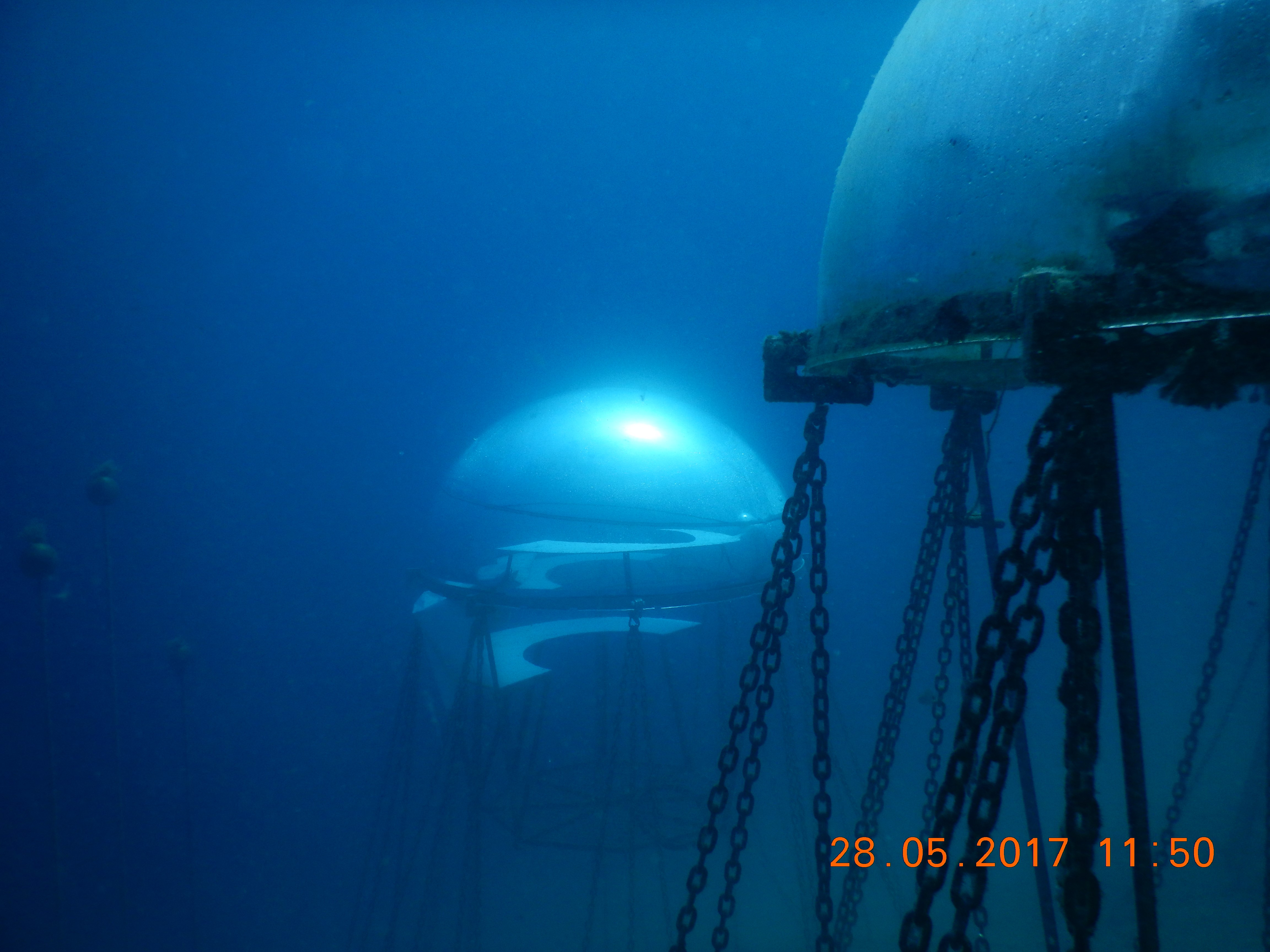
Frontal perspective: Biospheres

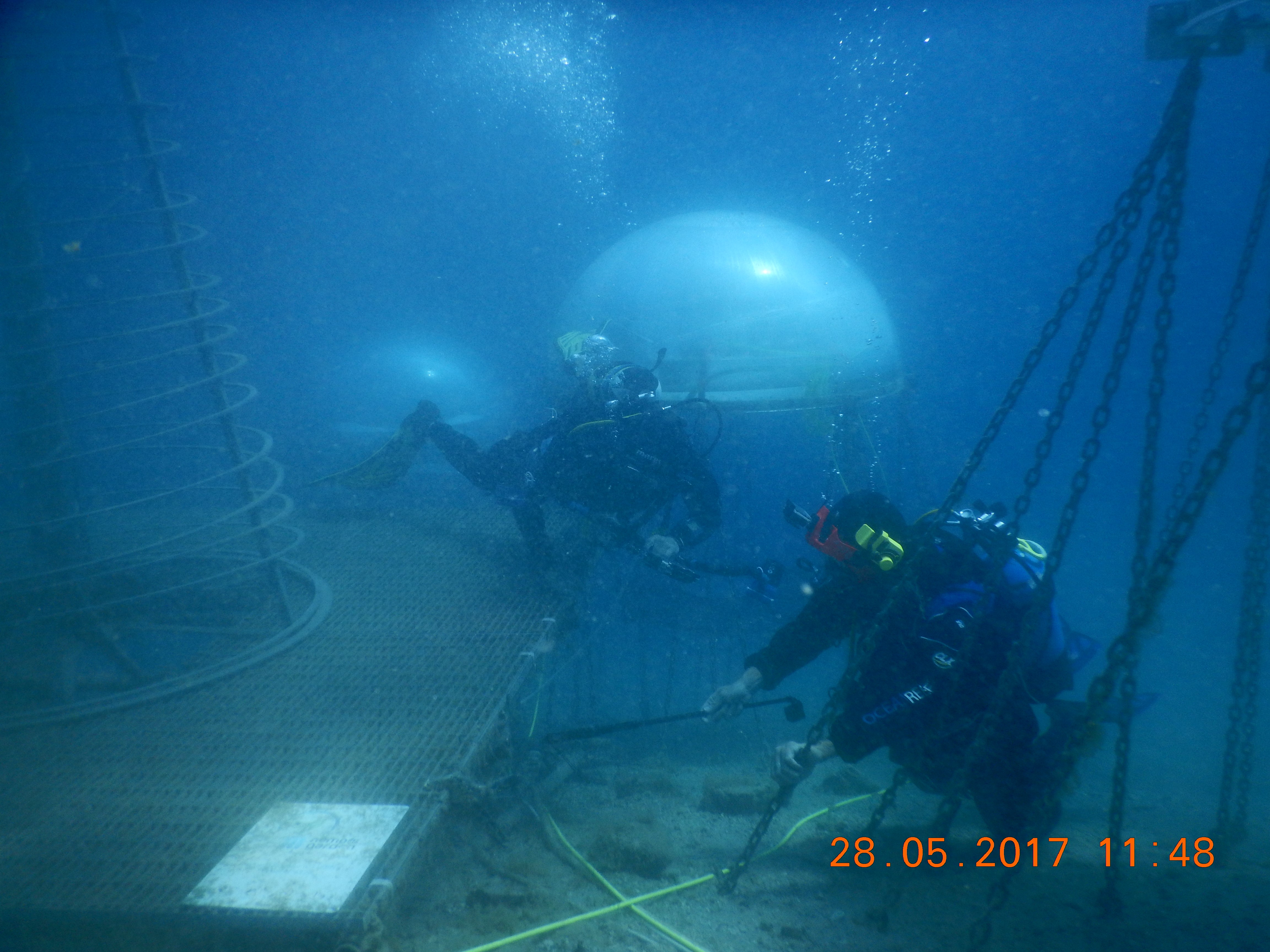
Structure maintenance

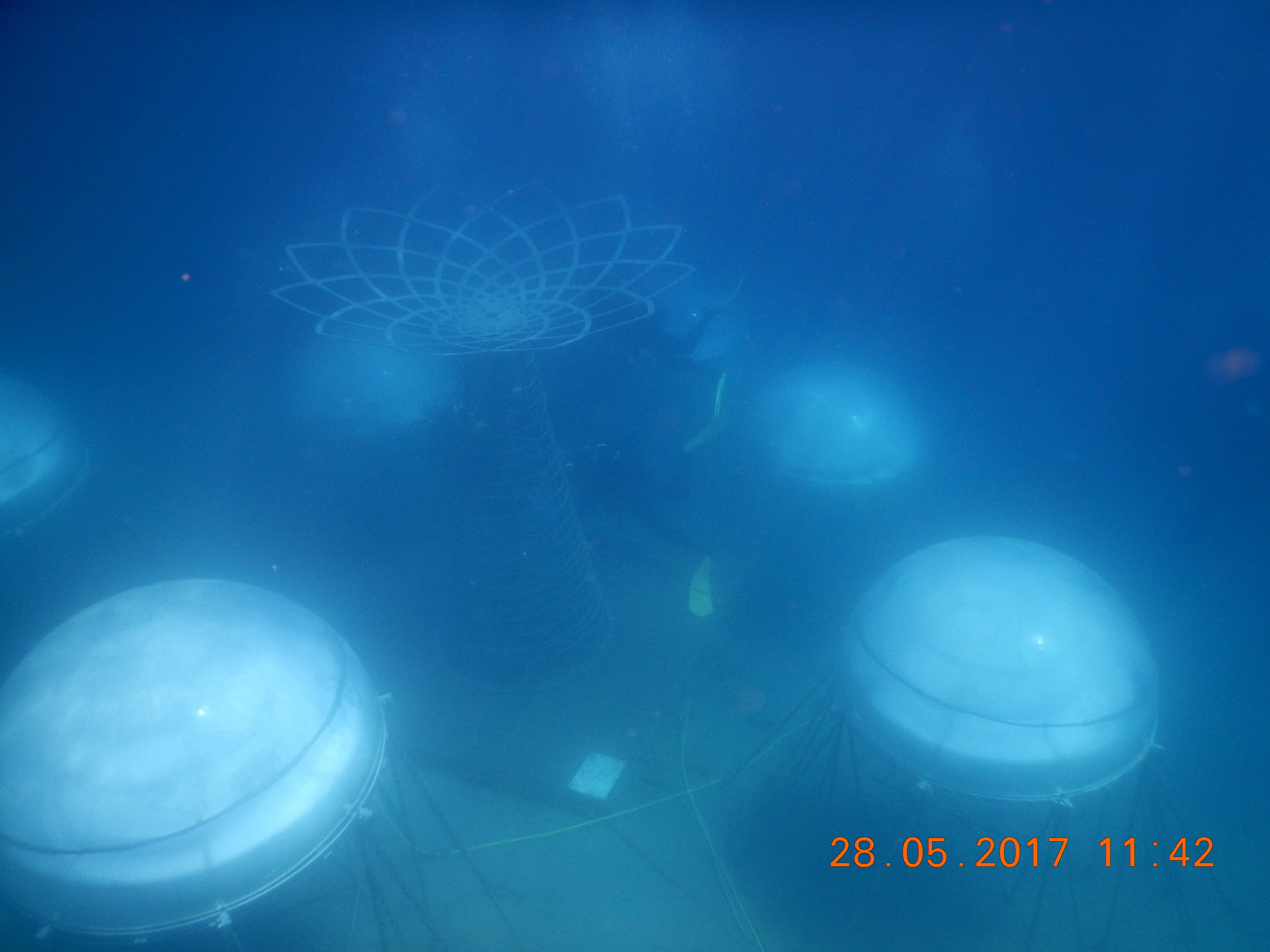
Up angle: Nemo's Garden
