= Stefano Lomellini =

Doge of the Republic of Genoa

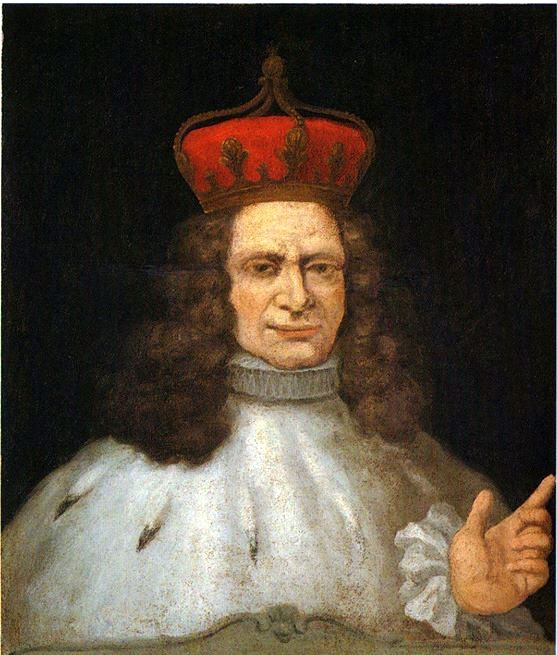

161st Doge of the Republic of Genoa
- In office 28 March 1752 – 7 June 1752
- Preceded by: Agostino Viale
- Succeeded by: Giovanni Battista Grimaldi

Personal details
- Born: 1683 Genoa, Republic of Genoa
- Died: 1753 (aged 69–70) Genoa, Republic of Genoa

Stefano Lomellini (1683 in Genoa – 1753 in Genoa) was the 161st Doge of the Republic of Genoa.

== Biography ==
Lomellini was known as a doge "out of obligation", since he never wanted to be the doge of the Republic. Just three months after his appointment he reformulated the same request for exemption, that he had already done when he was elected, but this time citing health problems and, having obtained a favorable response, and after payment for the exemption of 30,000 Genoese pounds, he was able to freely abdicate on 7 June 1752, an episode that has not happened since 1625 when doge Federico De Franchi Toso, following the outbreak of hostilities with the Piedmontese, preferred to resign to anticipate the customs elections. Consequently, he left political life to embrace religious life by becoming a priest. A very short, and above all never accepted, dogate, that of Doge Lomellini that fate would in any case have brought down early, a few months after his abdication, the nobleman died in Genoa in the early months of 1753.

== See also ==
- Republic of Genoa
- Doge of Genoa
