= Giovanni Battista Grimaldi =

Doge of the Republic of Genoa

162nd Doge of the Republic of Genoa
- In office 7 June 1752 – 7 June 1754
- Preceded by: Stefano Lomellini
- Succeeded by: Gian Giacomo Veneroso

Personal details
- Born: 1673 Genoa, Republic of Genoa
- Died: 1757 (aged 83–84) Genoa, Republic of Genoa

Giovanni Battista Grimaldi (1673 in Genoa – 1757 in Genoa) was the 162nd Doge of the Republic of Genoa.

== Biography ==
On 7 June 1752, the day of the abdication of Doge Stefano Lomellini, Grimaldi was elected by the Grand Council of the Republic as his successor, the seventeenth in biennial succession and the one hundred and sixty-second in republican history. In the Dogate he had to face two important internal issues, in the island of Corsica to counter the arrogance of the Marquis of Coursai and in the western Liguria where there were several anti-Genoese protests, with an indirect but "interested" involvement of the nearby Kingdom of Sardinia. He ceased office on 7 June 1754 and died in Genoa during 1757.

== See also ==
- Republic of Genoa
- Doge of Genoa
- House of Grimaldi
