= Agostino Lomellini =

Doge of the Republic of Genoa

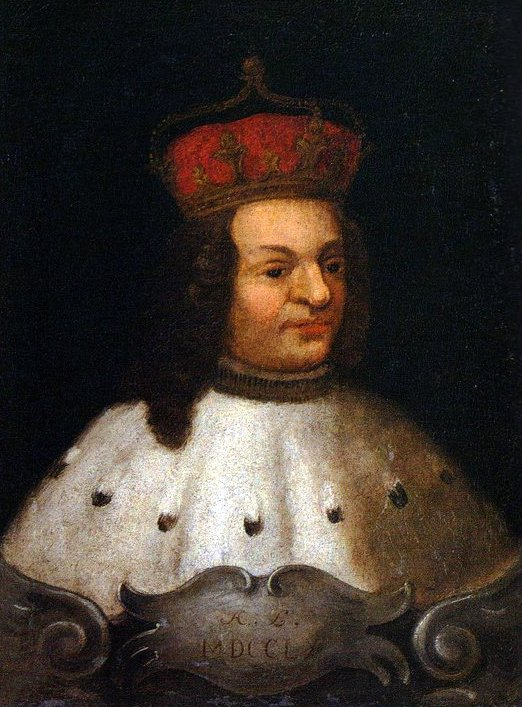

166th Doge of the Republic of Genoa
- In office September 22, 1760 – September 22, 1762
- Preceded by: Matteo Franzoni
- Succeeded by: Rodolfo Emilio Brignole Sale

Personal details
- Born: 1709 Genoa, Republic of Genoa
- Died: 1791 (aged 81–82) Genoa, Republic of Genoa

Agostino Lomellini (Genoa, 1709 – Genoa, 1791) was the 166th Doge of the Republic of Genoa.

== Biography ==
On September 22, 1760 he was elected by the new Grand Doge of Genoa: the one hundred and twenty-first in biennial succession and the one hundred and sixty-sixth in republican history. His mandate reminds the treatment and subsequent elimination with Spain of some economic restrictions which in the past undermined the Genoese economy and trade. Once the dogato ceased on 10 September 1762, he still served the Genoese state in tasks and assignments, such as being sent to Corsica where, however, his management was below the expectations.

== See also ==
- Republic of Genoa
- Doge of Genoa
