= Matteo Franzoni =

Doge of the Republic of Genoa

165th Doge of the Republic of Genoa
- In office 22 June 1758 – 22 June 1760
- Preceded by: Giovanni Giacomo Grimaldi
- Succeeded by: Agostino Lomellini

Personal details
- Born: 2 October 1682 Genoa, Republic of Genoa
- Died: 11 January 1767 (aged 84) Genoa, Republic of Genoa

Matteo Franzoni (Genoa, 2 October 1682 - Genoa, 11 January 1767) was the 165th Doge of the Republic of Genoa.

== Biography ==
The biennial mandate of Doge Matteo Franzoni was remembered in the annals and by the most illustrious Genoese historians, especially those most closely linked to the clergy, as unpopular and despotic; he was criticized in his choices for having convened the Senate a few times and in any case for assuming totalitarian and independent leadership, sometimes even trespassing beyond his own authorities and roles. And precisely against the religious power of the Holy See, Doge Franzoni once again promoted, especially after the refusal from Rome to the proposal of the Republic of Genoa for the appointment and control of the various bishops and priests residing in the tormented island-colony of Corsica. The term in office ended on 22 August the same year, contrary to the expectations of a large part of the nobility and of the Genoese people, the supreme trade unions pronounced positively for the subsequent appointment of Franzoni as perpetual procurator, a charge due to the former doges. He died in Genoa on 11 January 1767.

== See also ==
- Republic of Genoa
- Doge of Genoa
