= Rodolfo Emilio Brignole Sale =

Doge of the Republic of Genoa

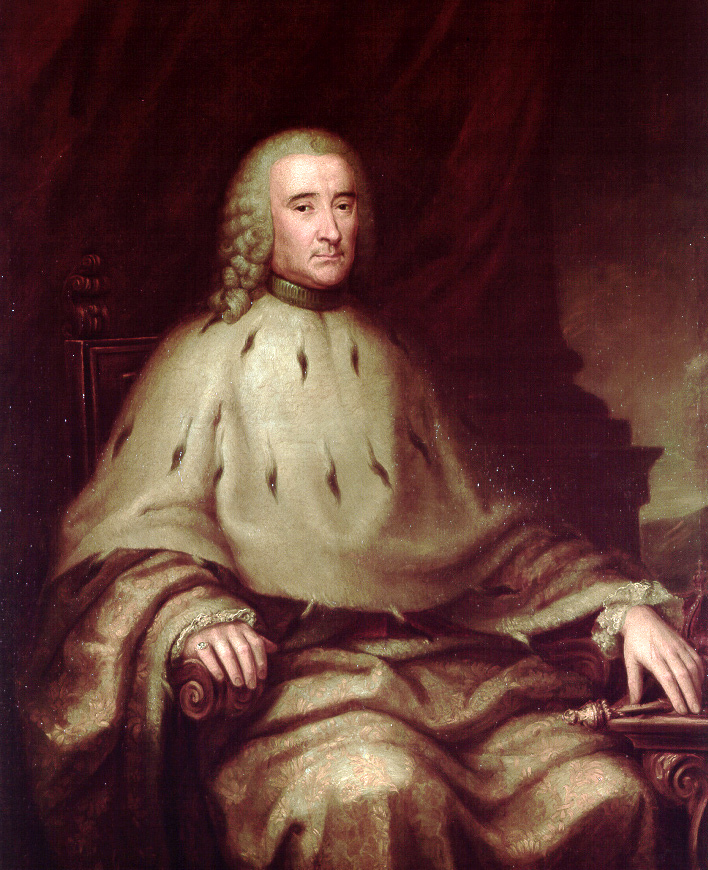

167th Doge of the Republic of Genoa
- In office 25 November 1762 – 25 November 1764
- Preceded by: Agostino Lomellini
- Succeeded by: Francesco Maria Della Rovere

Personal details
- Born: 27 June 1708 Genoa, Republic of Genoa
- Died: 18 April 1774 (aged 65) Genoa, Republic of Genoa

Rodolfo Emilio Brignole Sale, marquis of Groppoli (Genoa, 27 June 1708 - Genoa, 18 April 1774), was the 167th Doge of the Republic of Genoa from 25 November 1762 to 25 November 1764.

== Biography ==
He is the fourth and last son of Anton II Giulio Brignole Sale and Isabella Brignole, as well as younger brother of Giovanni Francesco II Brignole Sale, doge from 1746 to 1748 . He is the uncle of the Princess of Monaco and then of Condé Maria Caterina Brignole. Officially crowned with a solemn ceremony of 16 April 1763 at the Genoa Cathedral, in the mandate of the doge Rodolfo Brignole Sale the first institution of free schools for the poorest children of the city was approved, whose education was entrusted to some priests. After the Doge's two-year period, on 25 November 1764, Rodolfo Brignole Sale returned to stay in his palace in the historic center. He served the state again with the position of head of the War Magistrate and head of the State Inquisitors Magistrate. Brignole Sale died in 1774.

== See also ==
- Republic of Genoa
- Doge of Genoa
