= Giovanni Giacomo Grimaldi =

Doge of the Republic of Genoa

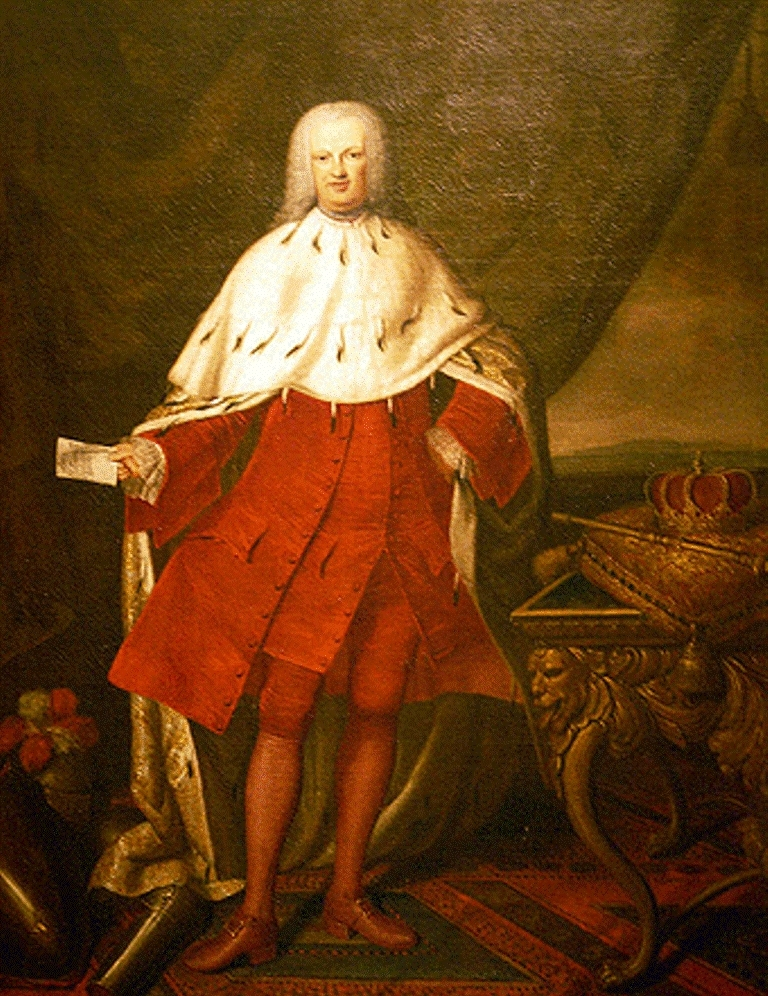

164th Doge of the Republic of Genoa
- In office June 22, 1756 – June 22, 1758
- Preceded by: Gian Giacomo Veneroso
- Succeeded by: Matteo Franzoni

Personal details
- Born: 1705 Genoa, Republic of Genoa
- Died: 1777 (aged 71–72) Padua, Republic of Venice

Giovanni Giacomo Grimaldi (Genoa, 1705 - Padua, 1777) was the 164th Doge of the Republic of Genoa.

== Biography ==
Grimaldi was appointed as doge in the elections of the Grand Council of 22 June, the nineteenth in biennial succession and the one hundred and sixty-fourth in republican history. His two-year mandate is recalled by a sumptuous Carnival party in the halls of the Doge's Palace which, although in the good intentions of Doge Grimaldi intended to follow what he saw and lived during his stays in Venice, sparked controversy and envy in various noble and citizen environments. After the office ended on 22 June 1758 he first moved to Corsica and, after having witnessed the various scenarios that definitively removed the island from Genoa in favor of the French, he moved to Venice. Single and without children, Giovanni Giacomo Grimaldi died in 1777 in Padua. He featured prominently in Episode 17, Chapter IV, of Casanova's "The Story of My Life".

== See also ==
- Republic of Genoa
- Doge of Genoa
- House of Grimaldi
