= Gian Giacomo Veneroso =

Doge of the Republic of Genoa

163rd Doge of the Republic of Genoa
- In office 23 June 1754 – 23 June 1756
- Preceded by: Giovanni Battista Grimaldi
- Succeeded by: Giovanni Giacomo Grimaldi

Personal details
- Born: 6 April 1701 Genoa, Republic of Genoa
- Died: 1758 (aged 56–57) Chiavari, Republic of Genoa

Gian Giacomo Veneroso (Genoa, 6 April 1701 - Chiavari, 17 November 1758) was the 163rd Doge of the Republic of Genoa.

== Biography ==
Veneroso was elected doge in June 1754. He ended his assignment on 23 June 1756, returning to the position of Magistrate of the Walls. After this, he was also magistrate of war. He had a son named Gerolamo.

== See also ==
- Republic of Genoa
- Doge of Genoa

== Sources ==
- Buonadonna, Sergio. Rosso doge. I dogi della Repubblica di Genova dal 1339 al 1797.
