= Francesco Maria Della Rovere =

Doge of the Republic of Genoa

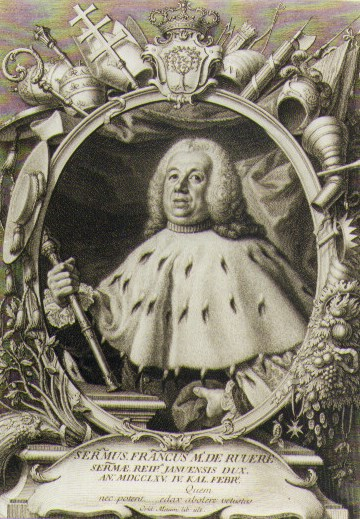

168th Doge of the Republic of Genoa
- In office 29 January 1765 – 29 January 1767
- Preceded by: Rodolfo Emilio Brignole Sale
- Succeeded by: Marcello Durazzo

Personal details
- Born: 13 February 1695 Genoa, Republic of Genoa
- Died: 23 May 1768 (aged 73) Genoa, Republic of Genoa

Francesco Maria Della Rovere (Genoa, 13 February 1695 - Genoa, 23 May 1768) was the 168th Doge of the Republic of Genoa, the last member of the Genoese branch of the Della Rovere family.

== Biography ==
During his mandate as Doge of Genoa, he commissioned new conservation and restoration works for the Doge's Palace, the residence of the doge in charge and seat of political power for the presence of the Major and Minor Council of the Republic of Genoa. He also maintained good relations with the Holy See in Rome and also thanks to his Roman knowledge he favored the cardinal election of the Genoese Nicolò Serra and Lazzaro Pallavicini. When the dogal office ended on 29 January 1767, Francesco Maria Della Rovere died in Genoa on 23 May 1768. Having had no children from his wife Caterina Negrone, daughter of the former doge Domenico Negrone, the Genoese noble branch of the Della Rovere family went extinct.

== See also ==
- Republic of Genoa
- Doge of Genoa

== Sources ==
- Buonadonna, Sergio. Rosso doge. I dogi della Repubblica di Genova dal 1339 al 1797.
