= Luiggi Giafferi =

Corsican politician

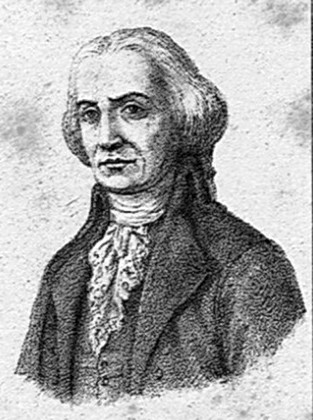
Portrait of Luigi Giafferi from Galletti's 1863 book

Luiggi or Luigi Giafferi (25 March 1668 Talasani – 1 October 1748) was a prime minister of Kingdom of Corsica (1736) and régent of Corsica (1736-1738).
