= Capture of Tabarka (1741) =

- Part of Tabarka expedition (1742), Tunisian–French war 1741-1742
Date	June 19, 1741
Location	Tabarka,Tunisia
Result	Tunisian victory

Belligerents
Beylik of Tunis	Republic of Genoa

Commanders and leaders
Abu l-Hasan Ali I Younes	Giacomo Lomellini

Strength
Unknown	Unknown

Casualties and losses
Unknwon	800–900 prisoners

The Capture of Tabarka took place in 1741 and involved Tunisian corsairs led by Younes Bey, son of Ali Pacha, against forces associated with the Republic of Genoa, represented by the Lomellini family and, in particular, Giacomo Lomellini, the owner of Tabarka. The conflict ended with the capture of the island by the Tunisian authorities and the destruction of its fortress.

== Background ==
The Lomellini were a Genoese family that governed and administered the settlement of Tabarka. They developed the island as a trading centre, expanding its activities beyond coral fishing to include grain trading, tuna fishing and the redemption of captives. Although their enterprise achieved some success, it remained largely a family-run operation and never became a major commercial centre.

Under the Lomellini, fishermen were allowed to settle in Tabarka with their families, leading to rapid population growth and the development of a distinct Tabarquin community. Despite maintaining their Ligurian origins, the inhabitants established contacts with the surrounding population and adopted elements of the local culture and way of life. The Genoese administration also maintained order and defended the settlement.

Morever, In 1741, an agreement was reached for the transfer of Tabarka to the Compagnie Royale d’Afrique, which had been established the previous year, in exchange for a payment of 100,000 livres to Giacomo Lomellini. The negotiations were conducted through Fougasse, director-general of the company at La Calle. However, the prolonged negotiations eventually became known in Tunis, and Ali Pacha was informed of the planned transfer. This ultimately led to military expeditions against Tabarka, including those led by his son Younes.

== Battle ==
In 1741, Ali Pacha captured Tabarka by surprise and destroyed most of the settlement, leaving the fortress intact. Around 900 inhabitants were taken captive. Meanwhile, approximately 500 people who were fishing at sea sought refuge at the French Bastion de France trading post near La Calle.

== Aftermath ==
Some of the 900 captives taken by Younes Bey were later ransomed, while others remained in Tunis and came to be regarded as inhabitants originating from Tabarka. These survivors formed the first group of Tabarquins, while a second group later originated from San Pietro.

== Sources ==
- Grandchamp, Pierre (1943). Les Tabarquins de Tunis (1741-1799) (PDF) (in French). Revue Tunisienne.
- Gafsi, Abdel Hakim (1988). Tabarka (Tunisie) (in French). mélanges de l’école française de Rome.
- Ouerfelli, Mohamed (2010). Histoire d’un comptoir génois en terre africaine : Gourdin (Philippe), Tabarka : histoire et archéologie d’un préside espagnol et d’un comptoir génois en terre africaine (XVe-XVIIIe siècle) (in French). Institut national du patrimoine de Tunis.
- Pellegrin, Arthur (1952). La destruction des établissements de Tabarque et du Cap Nègre en 1741 (PDF) (in French). Bulletin économique et social de la Tunisie.
