= Sack of Cape Negro =

- Part of Tabarka expedition (1742), Tunisian-French War 1741–1742
- establishment of Cap Negre and Tabarque
Date	August 16, 1741
Location	Cape Negro, Tunisia
Result	Tunisian victory
Territorial changes	Destruction of Cape Negro

Belligerents
Beylik of Tunis	Kingdom of France

Commanders and leaders
Abu l-Hasan Ali I Younes	Unknown

Strength
Unknown	Unknown

Casualties and losses
Unknown	Unknown

The Destruction of Cape Negro took place on 16 August 1741 and involved the Beylik of Tunis and the Kingdom of France. The conflict resulted in the destruction of Cape Negro.

== Background ==
In 1741, Cape Negro represented an important source of revenue in Africa for the Kingdom of France. Cape Negro was placed under the authority of the Compagnie Royale d’Afrique, which was based in Marseille. As the island of Tabarka was under the control of the Genoese Giacomo Lomellini, he decided to sell it, prompting the Kingdom of France to enter into negotiations with him through Monsieur Fougasse. These negotiations failed, and the Bey of Tunis became aware of the agreement. He subsequently decided to send his corsairs to confront the French.

== Destruction of Cape Negro ==
On 16 August 1741 Younes, the son of the Bey of Tunis, commanded an army of corsairs that destroyed and looted everything at Cape Negro, including warehouses, houses, and other buildings. The attack left the site completely devastated and resulted in the destruction of Cape Negro.

== Aftermath ==
The destruction of Cape Negro led to a French military expedition to Tabarka in 1742. The expedition ended in a French defeat and the recapture of Tabarka by the Tunisians.

== Sources ==
- De la Primaudaie, Élie (1861). Le commerce et la navigation de L'Algérie avant la colonisation française (in French).
- Pellegrin, Arthur (1952). La destruction des établissements de Tabarque et du Cap Nègre en 1741 (PDF) (in French).
- Masson, Paul (1903). histoire des établissements et du commerce français dans l'Afrique barbaresque (in French).
