= Ali Pasha =

Ali Pasha was the name of numerous Ottoman pashas named Ali. It is most commonly used to refer to Ali Pasha of Yanina (1740–1822).

== People ==
- Çandarlı Ali Pasha (died 1406), Ottoman grand vizier (1387–1406)
- Hadım Ali Pasha (died 1511), Ottoman grand vizier (1501–03, 1506–11)
- Sofu Hadım Ali Pasha (fl. 1537–1560), Ottoman governor of Diyarbekir, Bosnia and Egypt
- Semiz Ali Pasha (died 1565), Ottoman grand vizier (1561–1565)
- Müezzinzade Ali Pasha (died 1571), Ottoman governor of Egypt (1563–66) and commander in the Battle of Lepanto
- Uluç Ali Paşa (1519–1587), Ottoman Kapudan Pasha (admiral of the navy)
- Yavuz Ali Pasha (died 1604), Ottoman grand vizier (1603–04) and governor of Egypt (1601–03)
- Güzelce Ali Pasha (d. 1621), Ottoman grand vizier (1616–21)
- Sürmeli Ali Pasha (1645–1695), Ottoman grand vizier (1694–95)
- Çalık Ali Pasha (died 1698), Ottoman grand vizier (1692–93)
- Hekimoğlu Ali Pasha (1689–1758) served as Grand Vizier of the Ottoman Empire three times
- Silahdar Damat Ali Pasha (1667–1716), Ottoman grand vizier (1713–16)
- Çorlulu Ali Pasha (1670–1711), Ottoman grand vizier (1706–1710)
- Abu l-Hasan Ali I (1688–1756), ruler of Tunisia 1735–1756
- Moralı Ali Pasha (died 1735), Ottoman governor of various provinces, including Egypt (1725–26)
- Ali Pasha of Yanina or of Tepelena or of Janina/Yannina/Ioannina, or the Lion of Yannina (1740–1822), Ottoman Albanian ruler
- Ali Pasha Rizvanbegović (1783–1851), Ottoman governor of Herzegovina (1833–51)
- Trabluslu Ali Pasha (died 1804), Ottoman governor of Egypt (1803–04)
- Seydi Ali Pasha (died 1821), Ottoman Kapudan Pasha (admiral of the navy)
- Ali Pasha (Mamluk ruler of Baghdad) (r. 1802–1807)
- Mehmed Emin Âli Pasha (1815–1871), Ottoman grand vizier (1852–71) and a leader of the Tanzimat reforms
- Ali Pasha of Gucia (1817–1889), Albanian military leader
- Ali Pasha ibn Abd Allah (1859–1941), Sharif of Mecca

== Places ==
- Ali Pasha Mosque (Sarajevo), Bosnia and Herzegovina
- Ali Pasha Mosque (Tokat), Turkey
- Ali Pasha Castle, Albania

== See also ==
- Muhammad Ali Pasha (1769–1849), Ottoman Albanian commander, one-time governor of Egypt and Sudan
- Ali Rıza Pasha (governor of Baghdad) (fl. 1831–1842), Ottoman military leader and governor of Baghdad
- Ali Rıza Pasha (1860–1932), Ottoman grand vizier (1919–20)
- Ali Pasha Mosque (disambiguation)
