= Ali Pasha Mosque =

Ali Pasha is a Turkish name given to several mosques. Notable mosques with the name include:

- Ali Pasha Mosque, Diyarbakır, Turkey
- Ali Pasha Mosque (Ohrid) (1573), North Macedonia
- Ali Pasha Mosque (Sarajevo) (1561), Bosnia and Herzegovina
- Ali Pasha Mosque (Tokat) (1572), Turkey

== See also ==
- Mosque of Muhammad Ali, Cairo, Egypt
- Atik Ali Pasha Mosque, the name of two mosques in Fatih district, Istanbul, Turkey
- Kılıç Ali Pasha Mosque, Kılıç Ali Pasha Complex, Beyoğlu district, Istanbul, Turkey
- Hekimoğlu Ali Pasha Mosque, Fatih district, Istanbul, Turkey
