= Old consulate of Denmark in Tunis =

The old consulate of Denmark in Tunis is one of the monuments of the medina of Tunis.

== Localisation ==
The building is located in the European district of the medina near to Beb Bhar, in Al Zaytuna street.

== History ==
It was built in the 18th century as a primary school for boys. On 8 December 1751, Ali Pacha and Frederick V of Denmark signed a treaty by which the school became the consulate of the kingdom of Denmark and Norway.
