= Lomellini =

Lomellini is an Italian surname of Genoese origin.

The Lomellini family was a noble family in the Republic of Genoa (1099–1797).

== People ==
- Ignazio Lomellini (c. 1560–1645), Jesuit priest
- Benedetto Lomellini (1517–1579), Roman Catholic cardinal and bishop
- Battista Lomellini (1460–1540), 48th Doge of the Republic of Genoa
- Giannotto Lomellini (1519–1574), 68th Doge of the Republic of Genoa
- Giacomo Lomellini (1570–1652), 97th Doge of the Republic of Genoa
- Giovanni Battista Lomellini (1594–1674), 108th Doge of the Republic of Genoa and king of Corsica
- Stefano Lomellini (1683–1753), 161st Doge of the Republic of Genoa
- Agostino Lomellini (1709–1791), 166th Doge of the Republic of Genoa
- Giuseppe Lomellini (1723–1803), 175th Doge of the Republic of Genoa

== Other uses ==
- Palazzo Giacomo Lomellini, building in Genoa
- Palazzo Lomellini-Doria Lamba, building in Genoa
- Lomellini Ewer and Basin, silver artpiece
- The Lomellini Family, a portrait painting by the Flemish Baroque painter Anthony van Dyck
