= Vinsant =

Vinsant is a surname. Notable people with the surname include:

- Savannah Vinsant (born 1993), American trampoline gymnast
- Wilma Vinsant (1917–1945), American flight nurse
