= López de Lacalle =

López de Lacalle is a Spanish surname. It derives from the patronymic López and from the Sephardic surname Lacalle, De La Calle, De Lacalle or Calle.

The anthropologist Kenneth Moore explains that the xuetes (a despective term, similar to marrano) were called los de la calle ("the ones from the street") because they lived in the "street of the Jews" or call , from Hebrew kahal (קהל), a word used in Catalan-speaking areas.

== Notable people ==
- José Luis López de Lacalle (1938–2000), Spanish journalist
- Lorena López de Lacalle Arizti (born 1959), Basque politician

== See also ==
- La Calle
- Lacalle
