= Armando Torres III =

US marine (disappeared 2013)

- Spouse: Melissa Estrada
- Military career
- Allegiance: United States of America
- Branch: United States Marine Corps
- Service years: 7 years
- Conflicts: Iraq war Mexican drug war

Armando Torres III (disappeared 14 May 2013) is a U.S. marine in the Individual Ready Reserve who was reportedly kidnapped by gunmen near the U.S.-Mexico border in the Mexican state of Tamaulipas.

A native of San Benito, Texas, Torres served in United States Marine Corps in Africa and in the Iraq War for seven years. He then returned to Texas, where he worked at an energy service company. Before deciding to move to the state of Virginia, Torres went to visit his father in Mexico on 14 May 2013, but he never made it back. Reportedly, drug traffickers kidnapped him, his father, and one of his uncles at their ranch near the border city of Matamoros, Tamaulipas. The motives behind the abduction are unknown, but investigators believe they were kidnapped following a land dispute.

== Career ==
Torres (age 25) was born in San Benito, Texas, and lived there until he was 14 years old. Then, his family moved to the state of Virginia. He graduated from high school in 2005 and enlisted in the armed forces shortly afterwards.

Torres served in the armed forces for seven years as a U.S. marine in Africa and in the Iraq War. He is currently enlisted in the Individual Ready Reserve (IRR). As a reservist, Torres was living in Hargill, Texas, and was working at an energy services company. He has two sons (aged 2 and 4), and was separated from his wife Melissa Estrada.

== Kidnapping ==
On 14 May 2013 at around 6 p.m., Torres crossed the Progreso–Nuevo Progreso International Bridge from Texas into Mexico to visit his father and other relatives at their ranch at La Barranca, a rural community near the border city of Matamoros, Tamaulipas. Several hours after Torres's arrival, unidentified gunmen stormed the ranch and kidnapped him, his father Armando Torres II, and his uncle Salvador Torres. The gunmen also stole many belongings from the residence and three vehicles before leaving. That same evening between 8 and 9 p.m., Armando's sister Cristina Torres in Virginia received a phone call from her cousin who witnessed armed men in a white truck take Armando, his father, and his uncle by force. The motives behind the kidnapping are unknown, but relatives and investigators believe that the abduction may have been a result of a land dispute. According to Cristina, Armando's grandfather had sold a piece of his land in 2011 to Jesús Pecina Chaires, one of his neighbors. But when the neighbor failed to complete his payments, the Torres family took the land back. Upon the seizure one month earlier, the neighbor threatened revenge. An unnamed official said that after Torres's grandfather died, Torres's father and uncle went back on their father's land sale and retook the land, incurring the neighbor's wrath. The Tamaulipas state authorities allege that at least one of the members of the Pecina Chaires family has direct links with a Mexican drug trafficking organization.

Cristina said in an interview that she chatted online with Armando the day before the abduction, and said that he wanted to move to Virginia with his mother and sister. Armando told his sister that he wanted to bid farewell to his father and his family in Mexico before moving to Virginia in search of better work opportunities. Armando had not seen his father in years; while he was in the armed forces, he was not allowed to travel to Mexico. In response to the kidnapping, family and friends have used social media to help find Torres. His wife Melissa Estrada has asked people to contact lawmakers and sign two petitions that ask for Torres's safe return home. Fellow marines have contacted the White House through a petition asking the administration of President Barack Obama to demand the release of Torres. Others have emailed politicians and contacted several media outlets to increase the case's attention. By contacting their local representatives in Congress, U.S. marines in the United States have tried to make Torres's case reach a level of awareness in the media. Former New Mexico Governor Bill Richardson and Texas Congressman Rubén Hinojosa have responded to the email requests and expressed their support in the case. Hinojosa has been working with Congressman Filemon Vela Jr. and other Rio Grande Valley politicians to pressure Secretary of State John Kerry to use "diplomatic channels" to help find Torres. Among the congressmen who have also joined the White House petition are Ileana Ros-Lehtinen, Lynn Westmoreland, Mario Díaz-Balart, Aaron Schock, Edward Royce, John Carter, Walter B. Jones Jr., and Jeff Miller. A letter was also sent to Mexican ambassador to the United States Eduardo Medina-Mora Icaza urging the administration of President Enrique Peña Nieto to express their devotion in the case alongside the United States.

The Mexican authorities are working on the case alongside the Federal Bureau of Investigation (FBI), which has opened an international kidnapping investigation. Three weeks after the men's disappearance, although investigators on both sides of the border are pursuing the case, Tamaulipas authorities believe that the missing members of the Torres family are most likely dead and that their bodies will never be found, given the "circumstances of the case and the players involved". Armando's sister said her whole family still had hopes of finding Armando alive and safe back home, while the FBI neither confirmed or denied anything on Torres's status.

=== Background ===
The area where Armando was abducted is a key smuggling route for the Gulf Cartel, a transnational drug trafficking organization based in northeastern Mexico. Drug traffickers have been known to forcibly take ranches from people to facilitate their drug shipments, and especially properties that lie along the U.S.-Mexico border. Properties that border the Rio Grande River are attractive for smugglers because these areas make it difficult for U.S. law enforcement officers to intercept their drug trafficking activities. Large portions of the South Texas border with Tamaulipas are rural and contain uninhabited areas that smugglers use to traffic drugs into the United States. Drug traffickers also store their merchandise in storage places in these areas to later transport their drugs to towns and cities.

When former President Felipe Calderón took office in December 2006 and carried a military-led campaign to tackle the country's drug trafficking organizations, violence across Mexico spread. By the end of his presidency in 2012, at least 70,000 had been killed in drug cartel-related murders. Thousands more, roughly 25,000 adults and children, had disappeared. Many of these people were kidnapped by drug trafficking organizations; others, too, were reportedly disappeared by corrupt local, state, and/or federal authorities. According to the Mexico's Commission on Human Rights, an average of 49 people were kidnapped in Mexico every day in 2012, making it the highest kidnapping rate in the world. The figures may possibly be higher since many kidnappings in Mexico go unreported, mainly because citizens distrust the police and fear that the captors might kill the victims if they contact the authorities. For many Mexicans, paying the ransom is more convenient than calling the police to carry out an investigation given the low conviction rate throughout the country. Kidnappings, according to security experts, tarnishes urban dwellers' sense of security more than killings.

== See also ==
- Mexican drug war
