= Leonardo Della Torre =

Doge of the Republic of Genoa

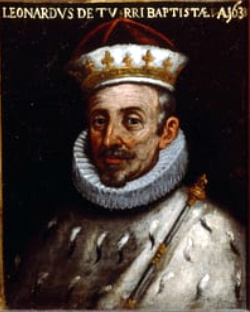

100th Doge of the Republic of Genoa
- In office 30 June 1631 – 30 June 1633
- Preceded by: Andrea Spinola
- Succeeded by: Giovanni Stefano Doria

Personal details
- Born: 1570 Genoa, Republic of Genoa
- Died: 16 August 1651 (aged 80–81) Genoa, Republic of Genoa

Leonardo Della Torre (Genoa, 1570 – Genoa, 16 August 1651) was the 100th Doge of the Republic of Genoa.

== Biography ==
On 30 June 1631 his person, who was still the supreme union and senator, was chosen by the Grand Council to lead the highest office in the state, the fifty-fifth in biennial succession and the hundredth in republican history. His dogate was remembered in the Genoese chronicles mainly for the peace negotiation that he started with the Duchy of Savoy. He ended his two-year term on 30 June 1633, but until his death in 1651 he continued to serve the state in official positions.

== See also ==
- Republic of Genoa
- Doge of Genoa
