= La Calle =

La Calle, meaning 'the street' in the Spanish language, may refer to:

- "La Calle" (song), a song written, produced and performed by Juan Luis Guerra and Juanes
- La Calle Stenger, a neighborhood located in San Benito, Texas
- El Kala, formerly La Calle, a port in Algeria

== People ==
- Andrés García La Calle (1909–1980), squadron leader of the 1st fighter squadron of the Spanish Republic and later Commander of all the fighter units of the Spanish Republican Air Force
- Antonio Sánchez de la Calle, a Spanish footballer
- Humberto De la Calle Lombana, a Colombian lawyer and politician

== See also ==
- Lacalle
- López de Lacalle
