= Andrea Spinola =

Doge of the Republic of Genoa

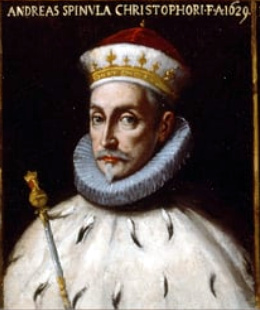

99th Doge of the Republic of Genoa
- In office 26 June 1629 – 26 June 1631
- Preceded by: Giovanni Luca Chiavari
- Succeeded by: Leonardo Della Torre

Personal details
- Born: 1562 Genoa, Republic of Genoa
- Died: 1641 (aged 78–79) Genoa, Republic of Genoa

Andrea Spinola (Genoa, 1562 - Genoa, 1641) was the 99th Doge of the Republic of Genoa.

== Biography ==
On 26 June 1629 Spinola was chosen by the Grand Council to lead the highest office in the state: the fifty-fourth in two-year succession and the ninety-ninth in republican history.

At the end of the Doge's two-year period, on 26 June 1631, he was therefore elected from among the perpetual prosecutors, taking up various positions for the Genoese state until his death. He died in Genoa in 1641 and his body was buried inside the chapel of the Nativity of the church of San Francesco di Castelletto.

From the marriage to Cecilia Spinola, daughter of Gerolamo Spinola, he had eleven children: four boys and seven girls. Among these Gerolamo and Carlo Spinola, that was the prince of Sant'Angelo dei Lombardi in the Avellino area.

== See also ==
- Republic of Genoa
- Doge of Genoa
- House of Spinola
