= Charles Fincher =

American cartoonist and lawyer

- Born: December 30, 1945 (age 80) South Padre Island, Texas
- Areas: Cartoonist, Writer, Penciller, Inker, Colourist
- Notable works: Thadeus & Weez; The Daily Scribble; LawComix

Charles Pugsley Fincher (born December 30, 1945, in San Benito, Texas) is an American cartoonist and lawyer. His cartoons and comics focus on the law.

== Education ==
Fincher received his bachelor's degree from the University of Texas at Austin in 1968, and he was a distinguished military graduate of St. Mary's University School of Law, where he received his juris doctor in 1971.

== Career ==
He was admitted to the State Bar of Texas in 1971 and admitted to practice before the Fifth Circuit and the U.S. District Court, Southern District of Texas. He has practiced law ever since.

In the 1970s, Fincher began publishing his law-related comics and strips. During 1987 he began his long-running Texas-themed political newspaper comic strip, Thadeus & Weez, which ran in 19 Texas newspapers before being retired in 2005. Also in 2005, he won "Best Web Cartoon" in the "People's Pick" category from About.com for The Illustrated Daily Scribble. Besides Texas newspapers, his editorial cartoons have appeared in the Arizona Daily Star and the Boston Herald, and his work has been reprinted in textbooks and legal journals.

For five years, Fincher's monthly lawyer strip Fenwilder & Jones ran in the ABA Journal.

Fincher ended his long-running political comic strip, The Illustrated Daily Scribble, in 2006, because, he said, "The Bush administration is hard to satirize."

A year later, he resumed Scribble and launched two new strips, Scribble-in-Law and Scribble Beach. His most recent cartoon characters include Bitcher & Prickman, comic law partners. He is also the founder of LawComix, a cartoon site for lawyers. He is the creator of Legal Isms, comic strips about lawyers, contracted by LexisNexis.

In 2008, Fincher was commissioned by the ABA's Council of Appellate Staff Attorneys (CASA) to paint a fantasy illustration of constitutional law professor Erwin Chemerinsky as a shortstop with the Chicago Cubs, the scholar's favorite team. The painting was presented to Chemerinsky at a conference.

Fincher practices at the Allison Law Firm, a private firm in South Padre Island, Texas that specializes in serious injury and wrongful death lawsuits.
