= Lacalle =

Lacalle is a surname. Notable people with the surname include:

- Alfi Conteh-Lacalle (born 1985), Spanish–Sierra Leonean footballer
- Andrés García La Calle (1909–1980), squadron leader of the 1st fighter squadron of the Spanish Republic and later Commander of all the fighter units of the Spanish Republican Air Force
- Borja Lacalle (born 2001), Spanish field hockey player
- Daniel Lacalle (born 1967), Spanish economist
- Fernando Sáenz Lacalle (born 1932), the tenth Bishop and sixth Archbishop of San Salvador, El Salvador
- Javier Lacalle (born 1969, Spanish politician
- Javier Zurbano Lacalle (born 1980), Spanish former footballer
- Joseph LaCalle (1860–1937), clarinettist, composer, conductor and music critic
- Luis Alberto Lacalle (born 1941), Uruguayan lawyer and politician who served as President of Uruguay from 1990 to 1995
- Luis Alberto Lacalle Pou (born 1973), Uruguayan lawyer and politician, current President of Uruguay since March 2020

== See also ==
- La Calle (disambiguation)
- López de Lacalle
