= Giovanni Stefano Doria =

Doge of the Republic of Genoa

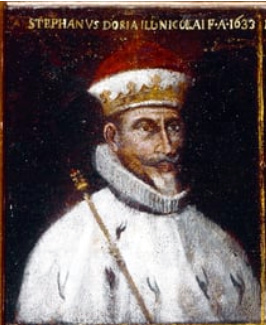

101st Doge of the Republic of Genoa
- In office 5 July 1633 – 5 July 1635
- Preceded by: Leonardo Della Torre
- Succeeded by: Giovanni Francesco I Brignole Sale

Personal details
- Born: 1578 Genoa, Republic of Genoa
- Died: 1643 (aged 64–65) Genoa, Republic of Genoa

Giovanni Stefano Doria (1578 in Genoa – 1643 in Genoa) was the 101st Doge of the Republic of Genoa.

== Career ==
On 5 July 1633 the Grand Council chose Giovanni Stefano Doria to lead the highest office in the state, the fifty-sixth in two-year succession and the one hundred and first in republican history. Despite the peace negotiations with the Duchy of Savoy, and consequently with the Spanish Empire, initiated by his predecessor Leonardo Della Torre, the Doria's two-year period focused on new economic-financial alliances with the Kingdom of France and in particular with the Prime Minister and Cardinal Richelieu. After the mandate ended on 5 July 1635 it is assumed that he continued to serve the state in various official positions. Doria died in Genoa in 1643.

== See also ==
- Republic of Genoa
- Doge of Genoa
- Doria (family)
