= Federico De Franchi Toso (1560–1630) =

Doge of the Republic of Genoa

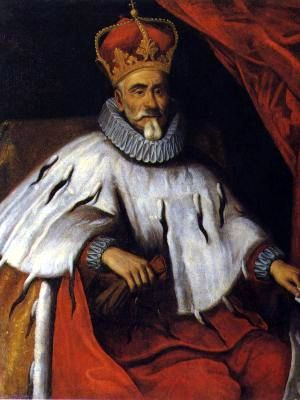

96th Doge of the Republic of Genoa
- In office 25 June 1623 – 16 June 1625
- Preceded by: Giorgio Centurione
- Succeeded by: Giacomo Lomellini

Personal details
- Born: 1560 Genoa, Republic of Genoa
- Died: 23 January 1630 (aged 69–70) Genoa, Republic of Genoa

Federico De Franchi Toso (1560 in Genoa – 23 January 1630 in Genoa) was the 96th Doge of the Republic of Genoa.

== Biography ==
Third-born son of Gerolamo De Franchi Toso, doge of Genoa in the biennium 1581–1583, and Isabella Sauli, he was born in Genoa around 1560. on 25 June 1623 De Franchi ascended to the highest office of the Genoese state, the 51st in two-year succession and the ninety-sixth in republican history. After a relatively quiet and normal first year of customs mandate, the remaining end of the two-year period was characterized by increasingly tense relationships between the Republic of Genoa and the Duchy of Savoy of Charles Emmanuel I. By now near the outbreak of the conflict, inserted between the war phases of the Thirty Years' War, an agreed advance of the customs elections was chosen. Genoa and the republican government could not have run the risk of a vacant seat in such a delicate war period. The doge voluntarily resigned from office on the morning of 16 June 1625 and already in the evening the Grand Council chose Giacomo Lomellini as his successor. With the arrival of old age and health, the former doge De Franchi attended little the life of the state. De Franchi Toso died on 23 January 1630 in Genoa.

== See also ==
- Republic of Genoa
- Doge of Genoa
