= Giulio Cesare Vachero =

Genoese adventurer and conspirator

- Born: c. 1586; Sospel, County of Nice
- Died: May 31, 1628 (aged approximately 42); Genoa, Republic of Genoa
- Cause of death: Decapitation
- Occupations: adventurer; conspirator
- Known for: conspiracy to overthrow the government of the Republic of Genoa
- Spouse: Ippolita Rela
- Criminal charges: High treason

Giulio Cesare Vachero (c. 1586 – May 31, 1628) was a Genoese adventurer and conspirator. He gave his name to one of the most famous conspiracies hatched in the 17th century against the government of the Republic of Genoa.

== Biography ==
Giulio Cesare Vachero was born in Sospel around 1586. He was the son of Bartolomeo Vachero, an enriched non-noble. In 1608 he married Ippolita Rela, of a distinguished Genoese family. After a series of misdemeanors, he was banished from the Republic. He was able to return in 1627 and settled in Genoa. Vachero put himself at the head of a group of wealthy and ambitious men of the popular class who were itching to be ennobled and to overthrow the existing oligarchy. They were recruited by Giovanni Antonio Ansaldo, an agent of the Duke of Savoy Charles Emmanuel, furnished with ample funds and told to raise groups of armed men who were to begin the coup d'état by occupying the Doge's Palace and exterminating as many of the old nobility as was possible. As soon as the insurrection was well under way, Charles Emmanuel promised to send in his troops to finish the job. The government was then to be reorganized, under the protection of the Duke of Savoy, with Vachero at its head as Doge. Meetings within the conspirators took place in Vachero's house, and plans for the insurrection were well advanced, when one of the traitors, Francesco Rodino, revealed the plot to the Doge Giovanni Luca Chiavari on payment of a substantial reward. Vachero was informed that the plot had been discovered and was able to go into hiding. The Republic offered a reward of 4,000 silver scudos for his capture. Vachero was betrayed and soon afterwards apprehended.

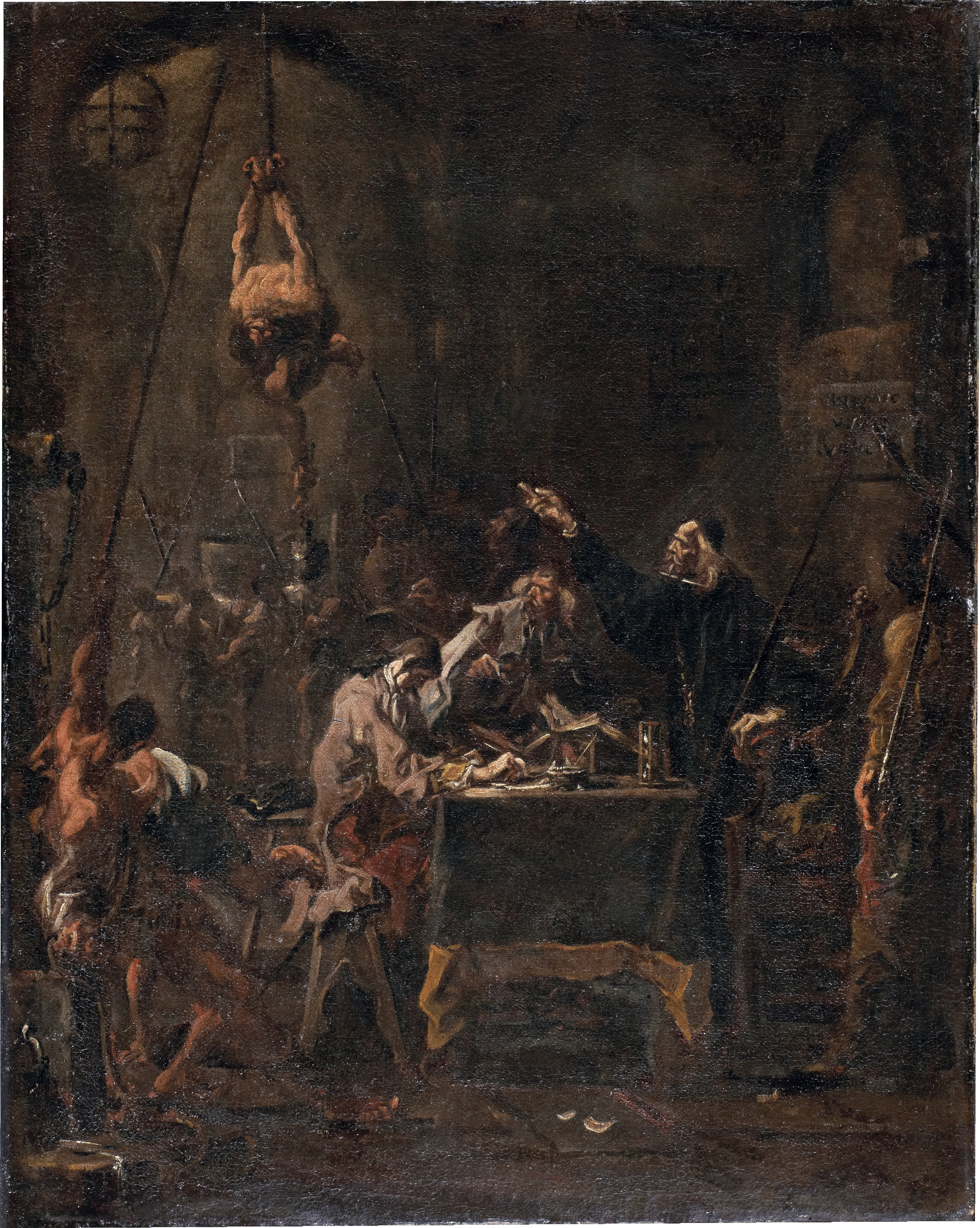
Torture scene by Alessandro Magnasco (1710). Frankfurt am Main, Städelsches Kunstinstitut.

During the interrogation preceding his trial, Vachero was tortured continuously for 36 hours but never named any of his accomplices. He was subjected to the most painful torments known as «Strappado» and a variant of this «la Sveglia». With the first, a prisoner's hands were tied behind his back and he was hauled up a few metres on a pulley fixed to a scaffold by a rope. To exert great pressure on, him he would then be made to drop, being jerked up sharply, before he reached the ground This praduced agonizing pain in the arms and shoulders and back. In the method of torture known as a «La Sveglia» the prisoner was kept tied up in the same position, with his feet just capable of touching the ground on tiptoe. After 36 hours of this, sustained only by an heroic rage, Vachero was released from the rope more dead than alive. Once the trial was completed, the culprits were executed on May 31, 1628, in spite of the remonstrances of the Duke of Savoy, who openly avowed himself the instigator of the conspiracy, and threatened reprisals. Vachero confessed his guilt only after the public pronunciation of the death sentence. His properties were confiscated, his house was demolished and his children were forced into exile.

== Legacy ==
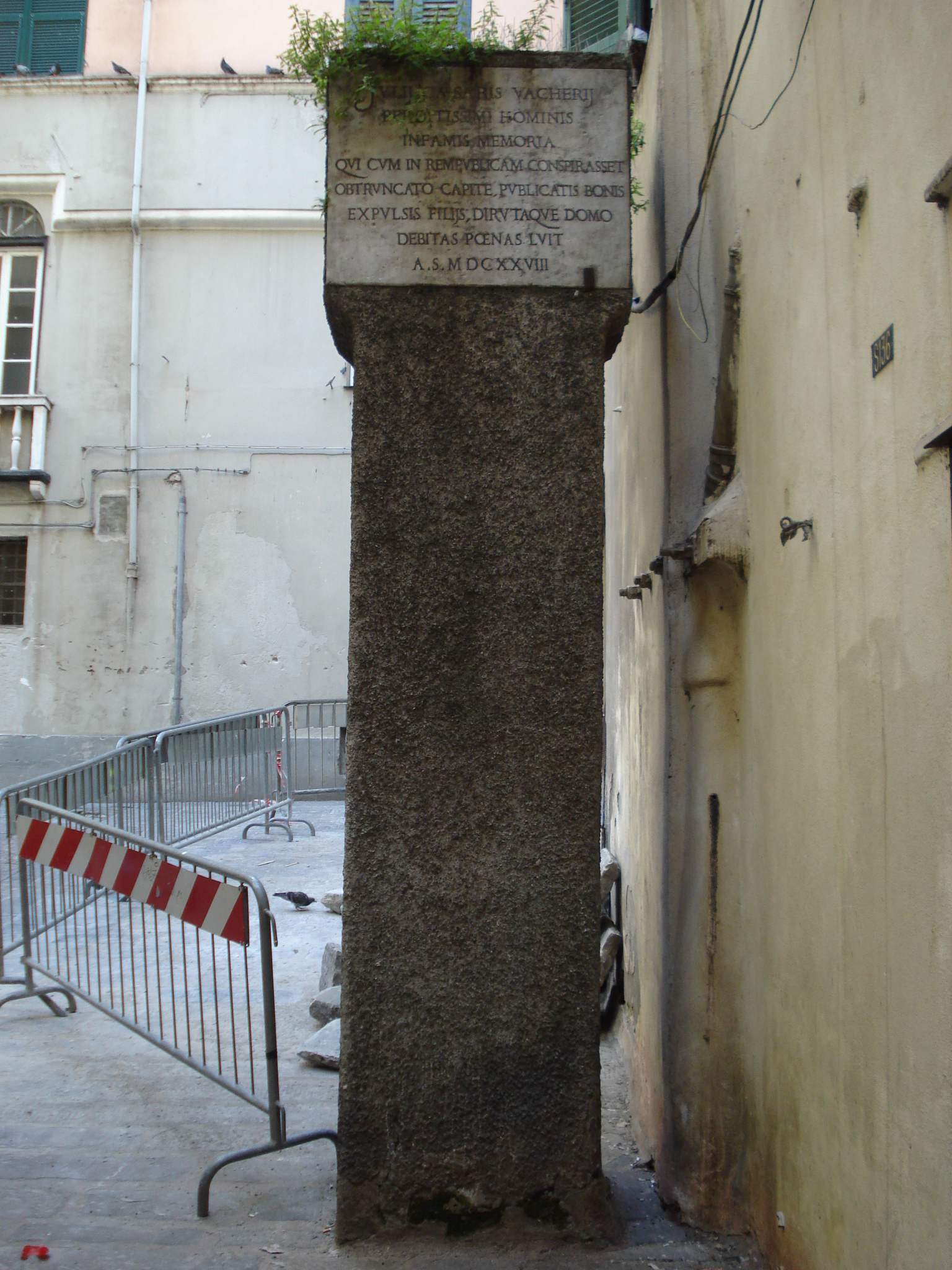
The column erected in 1628 in memory of the betrayal of Giulio Cesare Vachero

Following the failed conspiracy, the Republic established the Inquisitori di Stato (Inquisitors of the State), a sort of secret police whose main function was to safeguard the security of the State against its potential enemies. The episode, which had endangered the existence of the Republic, resulted in greater harmony between the nobles of different origins and greater moderation in disputes between nobles and commoners.

To this day in the Piazza Vachero, where Giulio Cesare's house was situated, there is a monument to the infamy of Giulio Cesare Vachero (now partly hidden by a fountain erected by his descendants).

Raffaele Della Torre, consultore in jure of the Republic and historian, wrote an history of the Vachero conspiracy that was published posthumously in 1846.

== Bibliography ==
- Media related to Giulio Cesare Vachero at Wikimedia Commons
- Della Torre, Raffaele, Congiura di Giulio Cesare Vachero, in Archivio storico italiano, Append. tomo III (1846), pp. 545–634.
- Arias, Gino (1897). La congiura di Giulio Cesare Vachero. Florence: Cellini.
- Fletcher, Robert (1912). "Columns of Infamy". American Anthropologist. 14 (4): 636–642. doi:10.1525/aa.1912.14.4.02a00070. JSTOR 659836.
- Quazza, Romolo (1929). "Genova, Savoia e Spagna dopo la congiura del Vachero". Bollettino Storico Bibliografico Subalpino. XXXI: 265–326.
- Giulio Cesare Vachero entry (in Italian) by Vito Antonio Vitale in the Enciclopedia Treccani, 1937
- Costantini, Claudio (1986). La Repubblica di Genova nell'età moderna. Turin: UTET. pp. 247–278.
- Ceccarelli, Alessia (2020). "VACCHERO, Giulio Cesare". Dizionario Biografico degli Italiani (in Italian). Vol. 97: Trivulzio–Valeri. Rome: Istituto dell'Enciclopedia Italiana. ISBN 978-88-12-00032-6.
