= Giovanni Luca Chiavari =

Doge of the Republic of Genoa

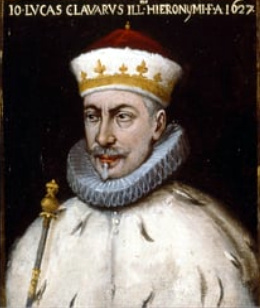

98th Doge of the Republic of Genoa
- In office 28 June 1627 – 28 June 1629
- Preceded by: Giacomo Lomellini
- Succeeded by: Andrea Spinola

Personal details
- Born: 1573 Genoa, Republic of Genoa
- Died: 1657 (aged 83–84) Genoa, Republic of Genoa

Giovanni Luca Chiavari (Genoa, 1573 - Genoa, 1657) was the 98th Doge of the Republic of Genoa.

== Biography ==
The beginning of his two-year term as doge was aroused by a new war that again involved the Kingdom of France and the Spanish Empire for the succession of Duchy of Montferrat with a Republic of Genoa forced if not obliged to play a neutral role. Added to this were the new contrasts with the Duchy of Savoy of Charles Emmanuel I.

In 1628 Giovanni Antonio Ansaldo, an agent of Charles Emmanuel I, recruited and furnished with ample funds a group of Genoese conspirators led by Giulio Cesare Vachero who were to overthrow the Republic of Genoa and place the city under the protection of the Duchy of Savoy. The plot failed and Vachero and his accomplices were sentenced to death. Following the failed conspiracy, the Republic established the Inquisitori di Stato (Inquisitors of the State), a sort of secret police whose main function was to safeguard the security of the State against its potential enemies.

Chiavari's mandate ended on 28 June 1629. He died in 1657.

== See also ==
- Republic of Genoa
- Doge of Genoa
