= San Benito, Texas =

- City
- City of San Benito
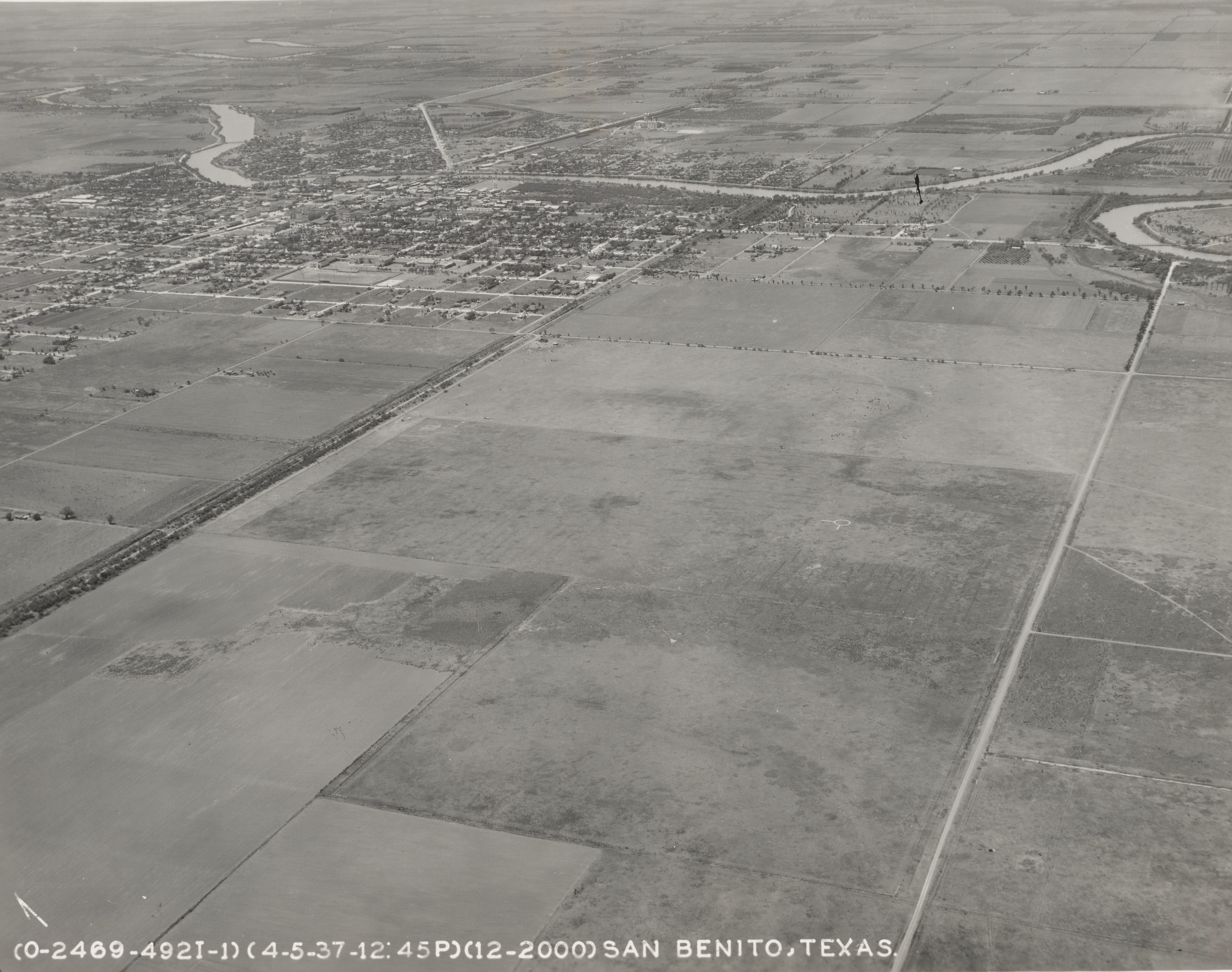
- San Benito in 1937
- Nickname: "The Resaca City"
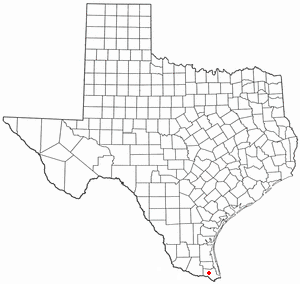
- Location of San Benito, Texas

- Coordinates: 26°8′12″N 97°38′9″W
- Country: United States
- State: Texas
- County: Cameron

Government
  - Type: Council-Manager
  - City Council: Mayor Celeste Sanchez
  - City Manager: Manuel Lara

Area
  - Total: 16.14 sq mi (41.79 km^{2})
  - Land: 15.79 sq mi (40.90 km^{2})
  - Water: 0.34 sq mi (0.89 km^{2})
- Elevation: 36 ft (11 m)

Population (2010)
  - Total: 24,861
  - Density: 1,574/sq mi (607.8/km^{2})
- Time zone: UTC-6 (Central (CST))
  - Summer (DST): UTC-5 (CDT)
- ZIP code: 78586
- Area code: 956
- FIPS code: 48-65036
- GNIS feature ID: 1375956
- Website: www.cityofsanbenito.com

San Benito is a city in Cameron County, in the U.S. state of Texas, United States. Its population was 24,861 at the 2020 census. On April 3, 2007, San Benito celebrated the 100th anniversary of its naming.

The post office was named "Diaz" from April to May 1907. The San Benito Museum, Freddy Fender Museum, and Conjunto Music Museum opened in the same building on November 17, 2007.

On October 25, 1975, on the television show Hee Haw, Freddy Fender saluted his hometown of San Benito, population 15,177.

San Benito is part of the Brownsville–Harlingen–Raymondville and the Matamoros–Brownsville metropolitan areas.

== History ==
San Benito is known as the "Resaca City". The Resaca de los Fresnos, 400 ft (120 m) wide, flows through the city. As indicated by its Spanish name, the resaca is a dry river bed. It is now the main canal of a large irrigation system.

San Benito was at first named "Diaz" in honor of Porfirio Díaz, president of Mexico at that time. The people in the San Benito area were predominantly of Mexican ancestry. The Anglo settlers came after the completion of the first irrigation system in 1906. Prior to that time, this region was an arid, mesquite- and cactus-covered wilderness. Irrigation water touched off crop production, supported by the railroad.

On July 4, 1904, the first passenger train arrived at Diaz. To celebrate the coming of the new railroad, the community leaders renamed the railroad station "Bessie", in honor of Bessie Yoakum, whose father, Benjamin Franklin Yoakum, was instrumental in the construction of the railroad.

Some time later, when the town site was surveyed, the name was changed to "San Benito" in honor of Benjamin Hicks, a pioneer rancher whose charitable attitude endeared him to the population. The name was suggested by Rafael Moreno, the popular 90-year-old camp cook of the surveying party.

San Benito was a village with a moderate number of homes, businesses, churches, and public schools several years before the town was incorporated in 1911. The original map of the townsite was recorded 28 April 1907. The first school was established in 1907 with 48 pupils and Miss Kate Purvis as the teacher. The post office also opened in 1907.

In 1927, the city adopted a commission form of government operating under a home rule charter.

In 1920, when the city was included in the U.S. Census count for the first time, San Benito had become a city of 4,070 people. By 1950, the census count expanded to 13,271. In 1960, the population had grown to 16,422 and 24,861 by 2020.

The irrigation district was organized in 1906. As a result of the availability of irrigation water, San Benito and all of the Lower Rio Grande Valley cities came to serve a newly developing agricultural territory.

The original townsite, created in 1911, contained 1,280 acres (520 ha). Since then, a series of annexations has increased the incorporated area to 4,092.17 acres (1,656.04 ha).

The mild winter climate in this southmost section of Texas has played a dominant role in the growth of San Benito and the other cities of the Lower Rio Grande Valley. Crops grow and flowers bloom year-round. The city has become a hotspot for winter tourists and retired people, providing a substantial percentage of the buying power of this community.

== Geography ==
San Benito is located west of the center of Cameron County at 26°8′12″N 97°38′9″W (26.136603, –97.635878). Interstate 69E passes through the city, leading northwest 6 miles (10 km) to Harlingen and southeast 19 miles (31 km) to Brownsville. According to the United States Census Bureau, San Benito has a total area of 16.1 square miles (41.8 km^{2}), of which 0.3 square miles (0.9 km^{2}), or 2.12%, is covered by water.

San Benito is also known as the "Resaca City", due to its resaca (a former tributary of the Rio Grande, which has been cut off for irrigation purposes).

=== Climate ===
The climate in this area is characterized by hot, dry summers and generally warm winters. According to the Köppen climate classification, San Benito has a semiarid, borderline tropical savannah climate, Cfa on climate maps.

== Demographics ==
Historical population
Census	Pop.	Note	%±
1920	5,070		—
1930	10,753		112.1%
1940	9,501		−11.6%
1950	13,271		39.7%
1960	16,422		23.7%
1970	15,176		−7.6%
1980	17,988		18.5%
1990	20,125		11.9%
2000	23,444		16.5%
2010	24,250		3.4%
2020	24,861		2.5%
U.S. Decennial Census; 1850–1900 1910; 1920 1930 1940; 1950 1960 1970; 1980 1990 2000; 2010

=== 2020 census ===
As of the 2020 census, 24,861 people, 8,058 households, and 5,472 families were residing in the city.

The median age was 34.2 years. 28.8% of residents were under the age of 18 and 16.1% of residents were 65 years of age or older. For every 100 females there were 93.0 males, and for every 100 females age 18 and over there were 88.8 males.

93.0% of residents lived in urban areas, while 7.0% lived in rural areas.

Of the 8,058 households, 40.6% had children under the age of 18 living in them, 42.3% were married-couple households, 17.2% were households with a male householder and no spouse or partner present, and 34.1% were households with a female householder and no spouse or partner present. About 21.1% of all households were made up of individuals and 11.0% had someone living alone who was 65 years of age or older.

There were 9,403 housing units, of which 14.3% were vacant. The homeowner vacancy rate was 1.4% and the rental vacancy rate was 8.4%.

Racial composition as of the 2020 census
Race	Number	Percent
White	9,716	39.1%
Black or African American	109	0.4%
American Indian and Alaska Native	129	0.5%
Asian	86	0.3%
Native Hawaiian and Other Pacific Islander	5	0.0%
Some other race	5,018	20.2%
Two or more races	9,798	39.4%
Hispanic or Latino (of any race)	22,795	91.7%

=== 2000 census ===
As of the 2000 census, 23,444 people, 7,065 households, and 5,715 families were residing in the city. The population density was 2,130.2 inhabitants per square mile (822.5/km^{2}). The 9,120 housing units averaged 828.7 per sq mi (319.8/km^{2}). The racial makeup of the city was 76.16% White, 0.32% African American, 0.41% Native American, 0.25% Asian, 20.48% from other races, and 2.38% from two or more races. Hispanics or Latinos of any race were 86.93% of the population.

Of the 7,065 households, 41.4% had children under 18 living with them, 56.6% were married couples living together, 19.5% had a female householder with no husband present, and 19.1% were not families. About 16.8% of all households were made up of individuals, and 10.7% had someone living alone who was 65 or older. The average household size was 3.30, and the average family size was 3.72.

In the city, the age distribution was 33.3% under 18, 10.5% from 18 to 24, 24.8% from 25 to 44, 17.8% from 45 to 64, and 13.6% who were 65 or older. The median age was 30 years. For every 100 females, there were 90.2 males. For every 100 females 18 and over, there were 84.1 males.

The median income for a household in the city was $24,027, and for a family was $26,415. Males had a median income of $22,097 versus $18,512 for females. The per capita income for the city was $10,317. About 28.7% of families and 32.7% of the population were below the poverty line, including 42.1% of those under age 18 and 22.8% of those age 65 or over.

== Government ==
The United States Postal Service operates the San Benito Post Office.

The Cameron County Animal Shelter is in an unincorporated area; it has a San Benito post office address.

== Education ==
The San Benito Consolidated Independent School District serves San Benito. The district has two high schools (Veterans Memorial Academy and San Benito High School), and three middle schools (Riverside, Berta Cabaza, and Miller Jordan).

In addition, South Texas Independent School District serves San Benito and many nearby communities by providing several magnet schools. South Texas Academy of Medical Technology is located in San Benito.

San Benito Public Library is the city's library.

IDEA Public Schools also has a school in San Benito.

== Notable people ==
- Charley Crockett, musician
- T. R. Fehrenbach, author
- Freddy Fender (born Baldemar Huerta), musician
- Charles Pugsley Fincher, cartoonist, lawyer, creator of Thadeus & Weez newspaper comic strip
- Narciso Martínez, conjunto musician
- Bobby Morrow, winner of three gold medals in the 1956 Summer Olympics
- Col. Sam A. Robertson, founder, railroad pioneer, first postmaster, World War I recipient of Distinguished Service Medal
- Charles M. Robinson III, author, history scholar
- Robert Salaburu, professional poker player, eighth-place finisher in the Main Event of the 2012 World Series of Poker
- Armando Torres III, a former U.S. Marine kidnapped in Mexico
- Wilma Vinsant, combat flight nurse killed over Germany

== See also ==
- La Calle Stenger
