= La Calle Stenger =

Neighborhood in San Benito, Texas

El Jardin is a barrio or neighborhood located in San Benito, Texas. It begins vertically aligned at East Stenger and initiates ultimately at West Stenger. Note that La Calle Stenger consists of streets that are adjacent to it as well. The barrio holds the most basis for small businesses with a pronounced Chicano or Mexican-American heritage in the city. One of the most notable bearings of La Calle Stenger are The Stonewall Jackson Hotel and The Narciso Martínez Cultural Arts Center.
