= The Lomellini Family =

Portrait by Anthony van Dyck

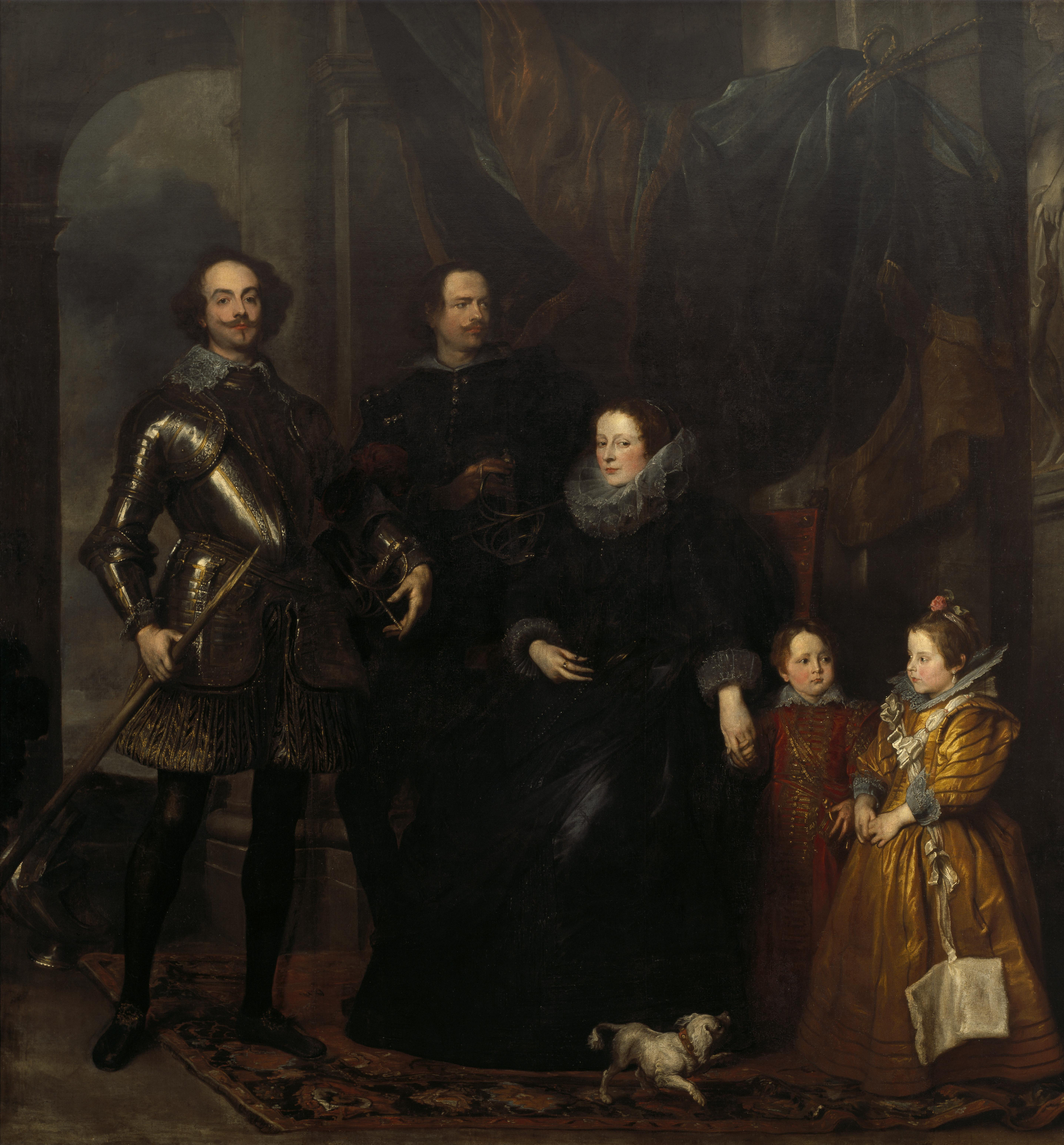
- Artist: Anthony van Dyck
- Year: c. 1625–1627
- Medium: Oil on canvas
- Dimensions: 269 cm × 254 cm (106 in × 100 in)
- Location: Scottish National Gallery, Edinburgh

The Lomellini Family is a portrait painting by the Flemish Baroque painter Anthony van Dyck. A group portrait of a landed Genoese family, it is in the Scottish National Gallery in Edinburgh.

== Painting ==
Van Dyck spent the years 1621–1627 in the city of Genoa, painting portraits for the city's wealthiest and most prominent patrons. This work is considered his grandest and most encompassing. It was commissioned by Giacomo Lomellini, the Doge of Genoa, and depicts his family, though he himself does not appear in the work. This is because incumbent doges were forbidden from being depicted, to prevent self-promotion. Lomellini's two eldest sons stand next to his second wife, and to her left are their two youngest children. It was acquired by the Royal Institution in 1830, and transferred to the gallery in 1859.

== See also ==
- List of paintings by Anthony van Dyck
