= Wilma Vinsant =

American flight nurse who served during World War II

Wilma "Dolly" R. Vinsant Shea (February 20, 1917 – April 14, 1945) was an American flight nurse who served during World War II. She died in an aircraft crash and was later memorialized for her courage and sacrifice. She was the only servicewoman from Texas to die on active duty in Europe during World War II.

== Biography ==
Vinsant was born in San Benito, was an only child and her mother was formerly a nurse while her father was a veteran of World War I. She was five feet tall and weighed around a hundred pounds. Vinsant attended and graduated from San Benito High School. Around 1934, she attended Brownsville Junior College. She received her nursing certificate from John Sealy Hospital. She began acting as a flight nurse for crews on Braniff Airways.

On September 1, 1942, she enlisted as lieutenant in the Nurses Corps, training at Camp Swift. During the holidays of 1943, she took leave and visited her parents at home. She qualified for the Air Evacuation Nurse Corps and graduated with the first flight nurse class at Bowman Field, Kentucky. After graduation, she was stationed in England with the 806th Medical Air Evacuation Squadron and worked in combat situations for the next two years. She was also involved in transporting wounded and injured soldiers back to the United States in the Air Evacuation Service. Early in 1945, she married Walter Shea, an army operations officer, in England. Vinsant completed her hazardous flight quota and asked "to make one more trip." On April 14, 1945, she died in action over Germany when the C-47 Dakota she was flying in crashed near Eschwege.

Vinsant was the only woman from Texas and one of seventeen flight nurses to die on active duty in Europe during the war. After her death, she was awarded a personal citation and a Purple Heart decoration from President Harry S. Truman. She had also earned the Air Medal and a Red Cross Medal. She was buried in the Netherlands American Cemetery in Margraten.

== Legacy ==
In 1949, an eighty-one-bed hospital named Dolly Vinsant Memorial Hospital opened in San Benito; it closed in October 2007. Later Southwest Key ran a shelter for undocumented immigrant children in the former hospital. The life-size portrait of Vinsant that once hung in the hospital is still missing.

An organization named after her, the Dolly Vinsant Memorial Foundation, provides scholarships for local students who are interested in entering the medical field. An annual award, the Wilma "Dolly" Vinsant Flight Nurse of the Year award is given out by the Commemorative Air Force (CAF). Recipients of the award "put patient care above self" and must be involved in in-flight evacuations and healthcare missions.
