= Atik Ali Pasha Mosque =

Atik Ali Pasha Mosque may refer to one of two mosques built in the Fatih district of Istanbul, Turkey by the late 15th- and early 16th-century Ottoman statesman Hadım Atik Ali Pasha:

- Gazi Atik Ali Pasha Mosque, in the Çemberlitaş neighborhood
- Vasat Atik Ali Pasha Mosque, in the Karagümrük neighborhood
- Atik Ali Pasha Mosque, in the Edirne

== See also ==
- Atik Valide Mosque
