= Ali Pasha Mosque (Ohrid) =

Mosque in Ohrid, North Macedonia

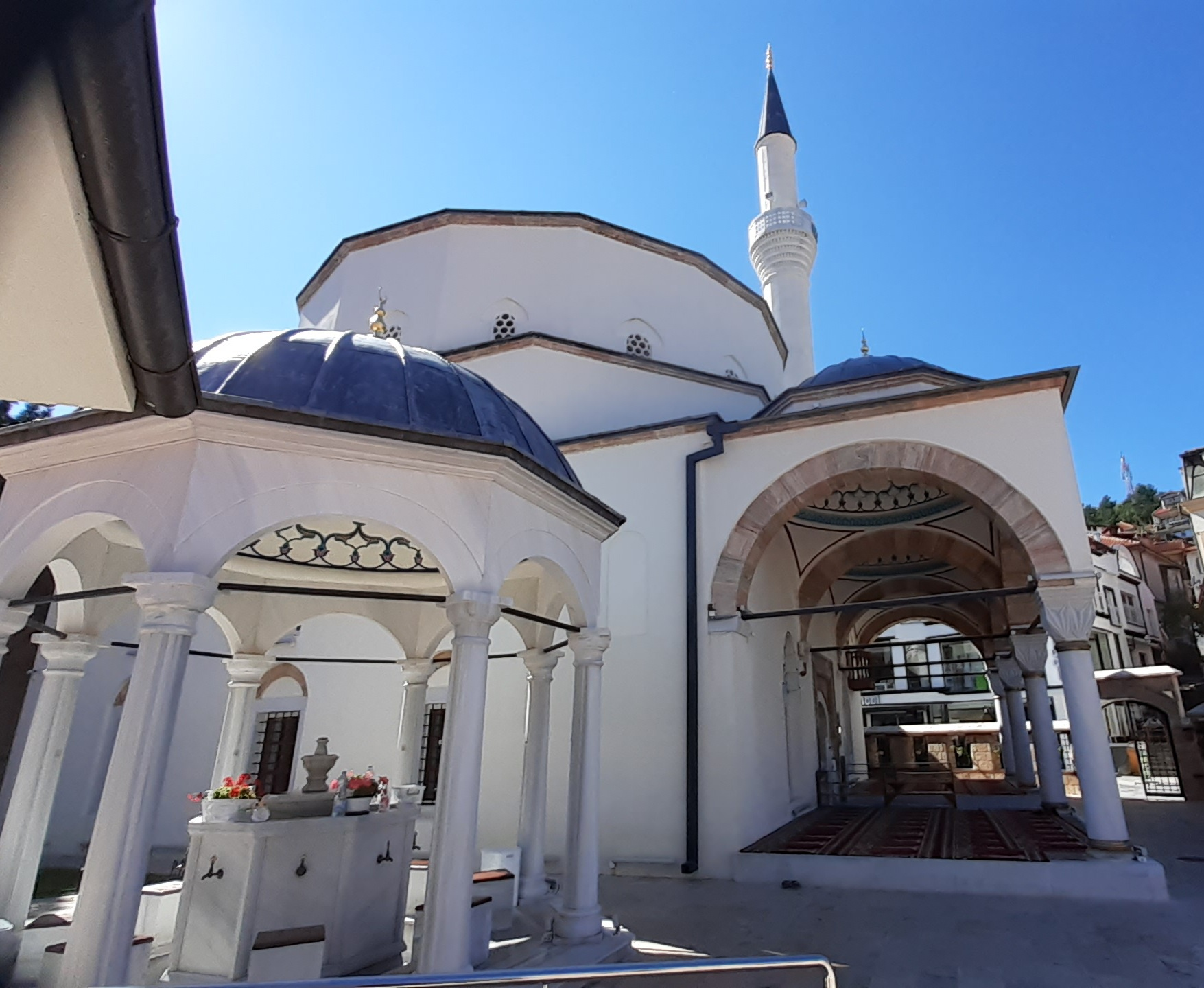

Religion
- Affiliation: Islam

Location
- Municipality: Ohrid
- Country: North Macedonia
- Interactive map of Ali Pasha Mosque
- Coordinates: 41°06′56″N 20°48′02″E

Architecture
- Type: mosque

Specifications
- Minaret: 1
- Minaret height: 32 m

The Ali Pasha Mosque (Note: Macedonian: Али-Пашина Џамија Ali-Pašina Džamija; Albanian: Xhamia e Ali Pashës; Turkish: Ali Paşa Camii) is the main mosque in the city of Ohrid, North Macedonia. It is the seat of a muftiate.

The mosque was built in the city's Old Bazaar in 1573. It was renovated by the vizier Ali Pasha of Yanina and posthumously given his name in 1823. Evliya Çelebi, a 17th-century Ottoman explorer, mentioned the mosque having two minarets, though the second was never captured in a photograph; the other was demolished at some point in the 1910s and survived as a 6.5-metre stub.

On 1 April 2015, an agreement was signed between the Turkish government and North Macedonia's Islamic Union for renovation of the mosque. There was some local opposition to plans to extend the minaret to 32 metres, arguing that a lack of planning debate could harm communal relations in the majority Christian city. The project was completed in November 2019.

== Gallery ==
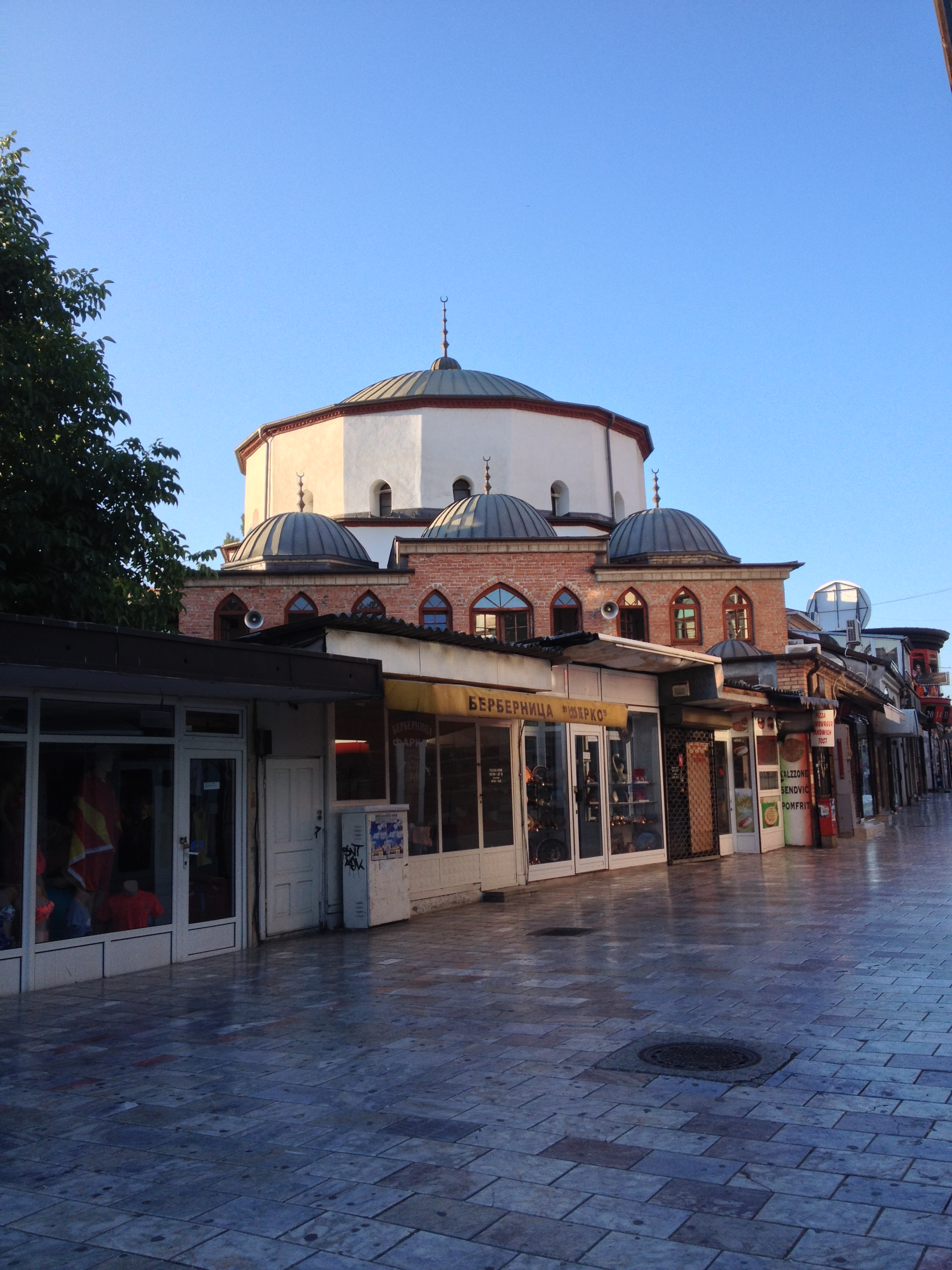
View from the street in 2014, before the extension of the minaret

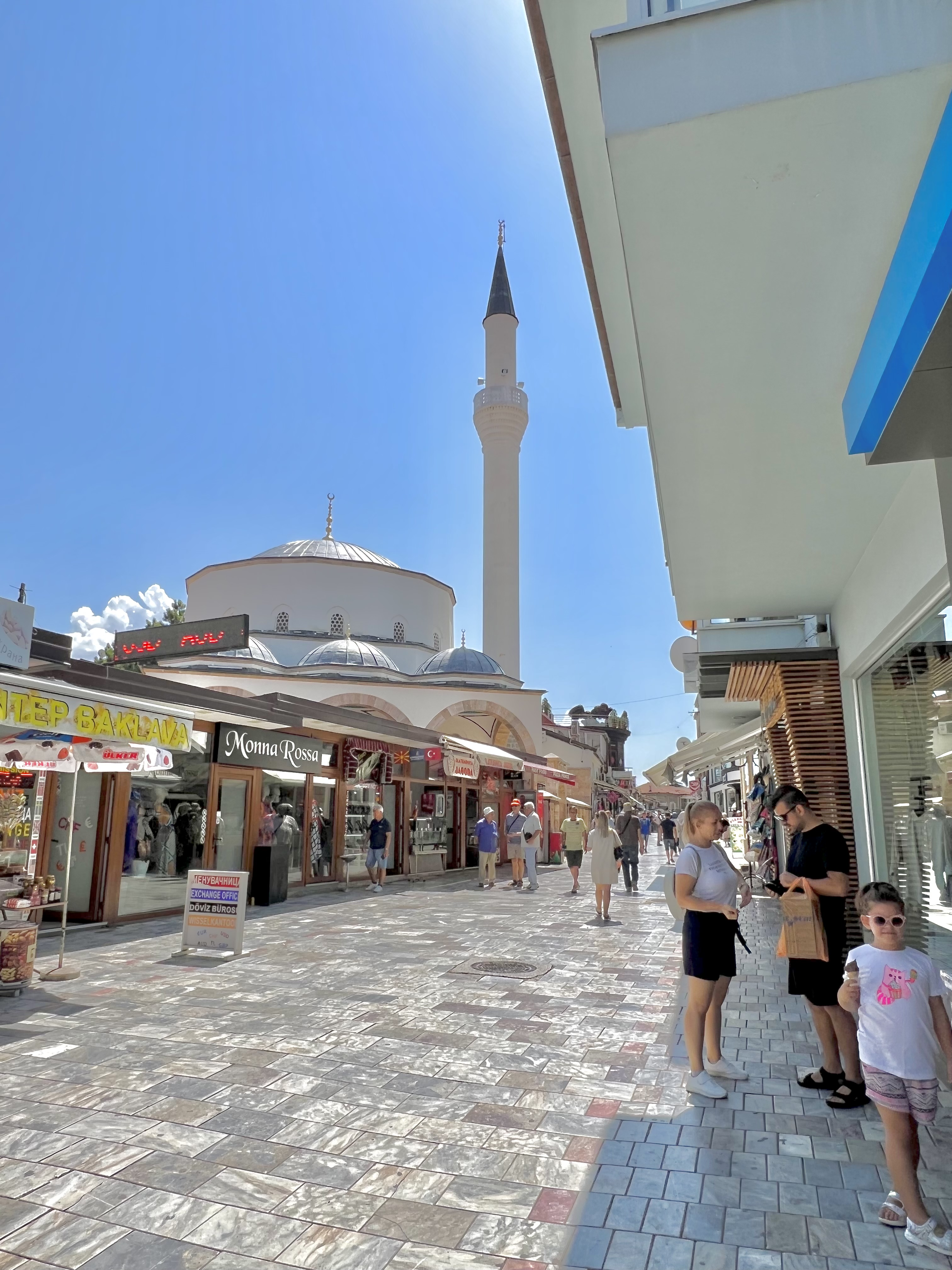
View from the street in 2022, including the finished minaret
