= Tabarka expedition (1742) =

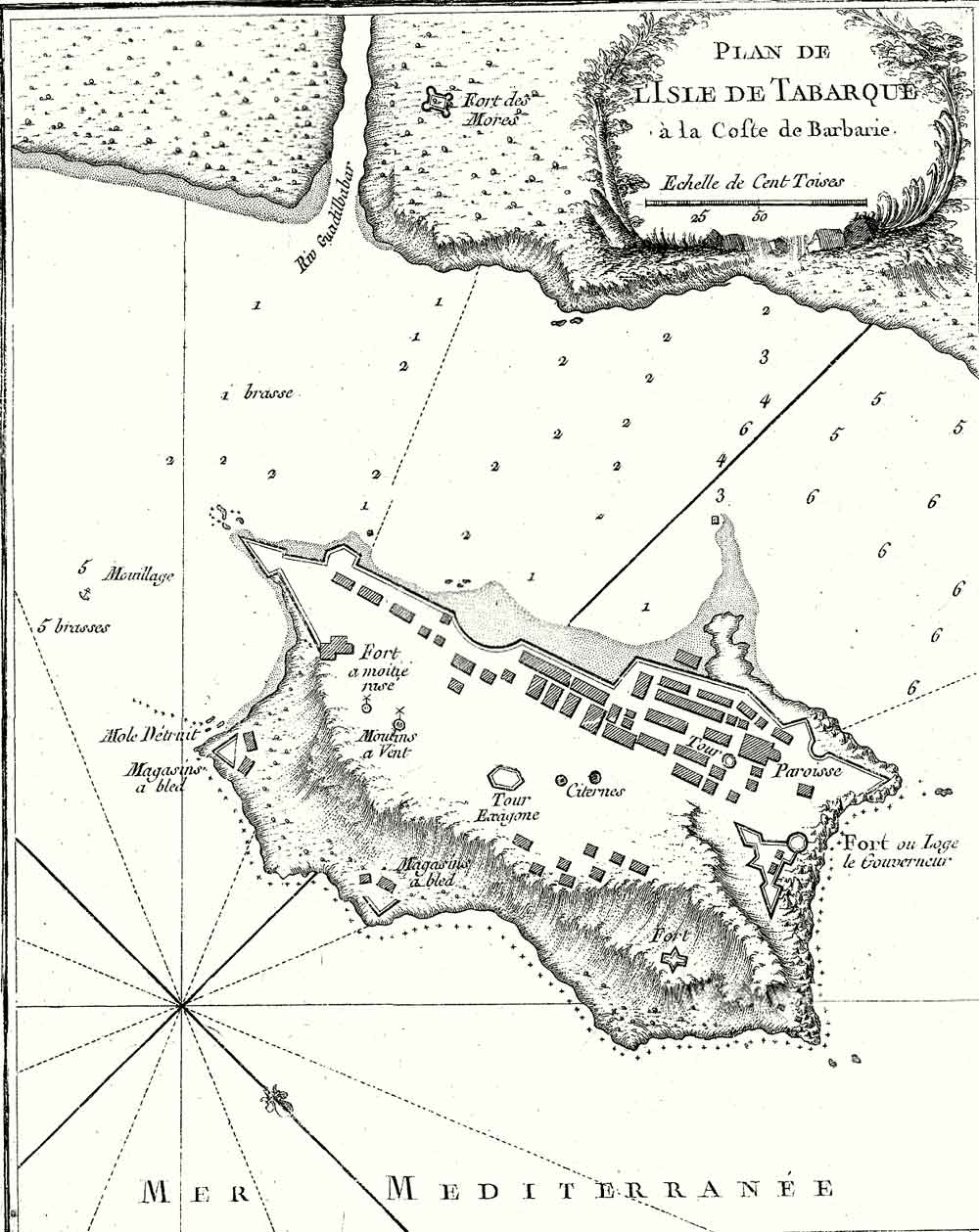
- Tabarka in 18th century
| Date | 2 July 1742 |
| Location | Tabarka |
| Result | Tunisian victory |

Belligerents
| Beylik of Tunis | Kingdom of France |

Commanders and leaders
| Abu l-Hasan Ali I | (Kingdom of France) Murat de Saurins (POW) |

Strength
| Unknown | 300 men |

Casualties and losses
| Unknown | 27–100 killed 224 captured |

The Tabarka Expedition was a French military campaign to seize the island of Tabarka from Beylik of Tunis. The campaign ended in a fiasco for the French troops who suffered an ambush and their leader was captured.

During the first half of the 18th century, the French government and the Genoese Lomellini family, who owned Tabarka, held several negotiations to cede control of Tabarka island to the French. Both sides almost settled, however, the Bey of Tunis, Abu l-Hasan Ali I, learned of their transaction and dispatched troops to occupy the island they successfully captured on June 12, 1741. The Tunisians destroyed the settlement and carried 800 Genoese slaves. Ali Bey also sent a force to destroy the French settlement of Cap Nègre.

The French, wanting to capture Tabarka, dispatched a naval expedition consisting of 300 men, led by a maritime officer, Murat de Saurins. Murat landed on Tabarka on July 2, 1741. The French troops attempted to capture Tabarka by a ruse, however, they faced an ambush by the Tunisians and suffered heavy losses. The French troops had 27 or 100 killed, and 224 captured, including Murat. Murat was taken to Tunis. The Tunisians had the heads of the dead displayed next to French merchant houses.

A war broke out between France and England. The French made a peace treaty with the Tunisians, the conditions were almost the same as 1685, with additions of the Tunisian right to search any runaway slaves on French ships and required the French to release Tunisian prisoners. The French slaves were released in the end.

== Sources ==
- E. J. Brill (1993), E.J. Brill's First Encyclopaedia of Islam, 1913–1936. S-Ṭaiba· Vol VII.
- Gillian Weiss (2011), Captives and Corsairs, France and Slavery in the Early Modern Mediterranean.
- Alexander Meyrick Broadley (1882), The Last Punic War: Tunis, Past and Present; with a Narrative of the French Conquest of the Regency, Vol I.
