= Ali Pasha Mosque (Tokat) =

Mosque in Tokat, Turkey

- Ali Paşa Camii
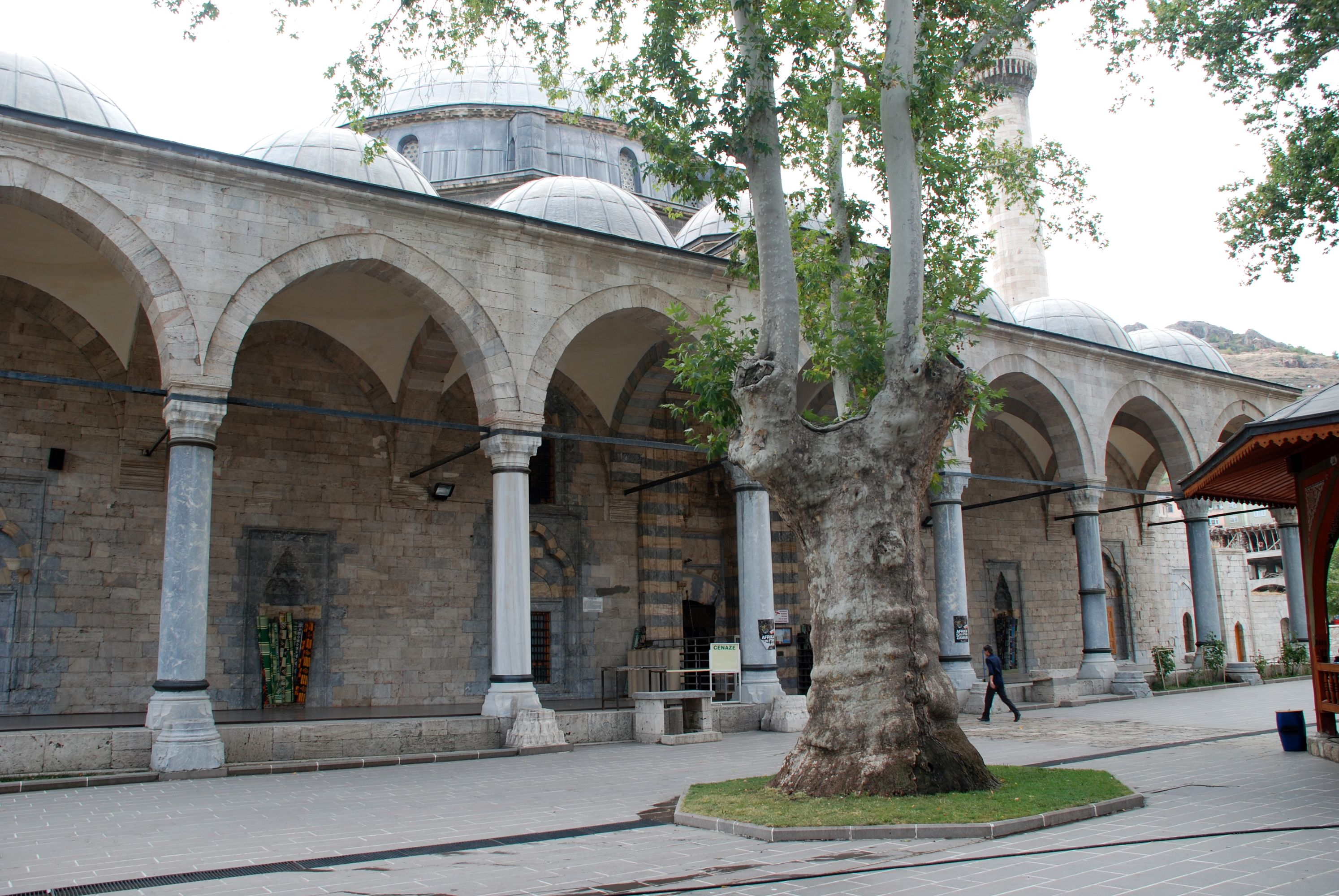

- Location within Turkey

Religion
- Affiliation: Islam
- Leadership: Imam(s): Halit Sert

Location
- Location: Tokat
- Country: Turkey
- Administration: Turkey government
- Coordinates: 40.1850°N 36.3315°E

Architecture
- Type: mosque
- Completed: 1571
- Minaret: 1

Website
- www.tokat.bel.tr

Ali Pasha Mosque (Turkish: Ali Paşa Camii) is a mosque in the centre of the town of Tokat in the Anatolia region of Turkey. It is a work of the Ottoman period, built in 1572 during the reign of Sultan Selim II, and has a single dome and a minaret.

It is part of complex which also includes a hamam (Turkish bathhouse) and a mausoleum. The tomb of Ali Pasha and his son Mustafa Bey is in the courtyard.

== Gallery ==
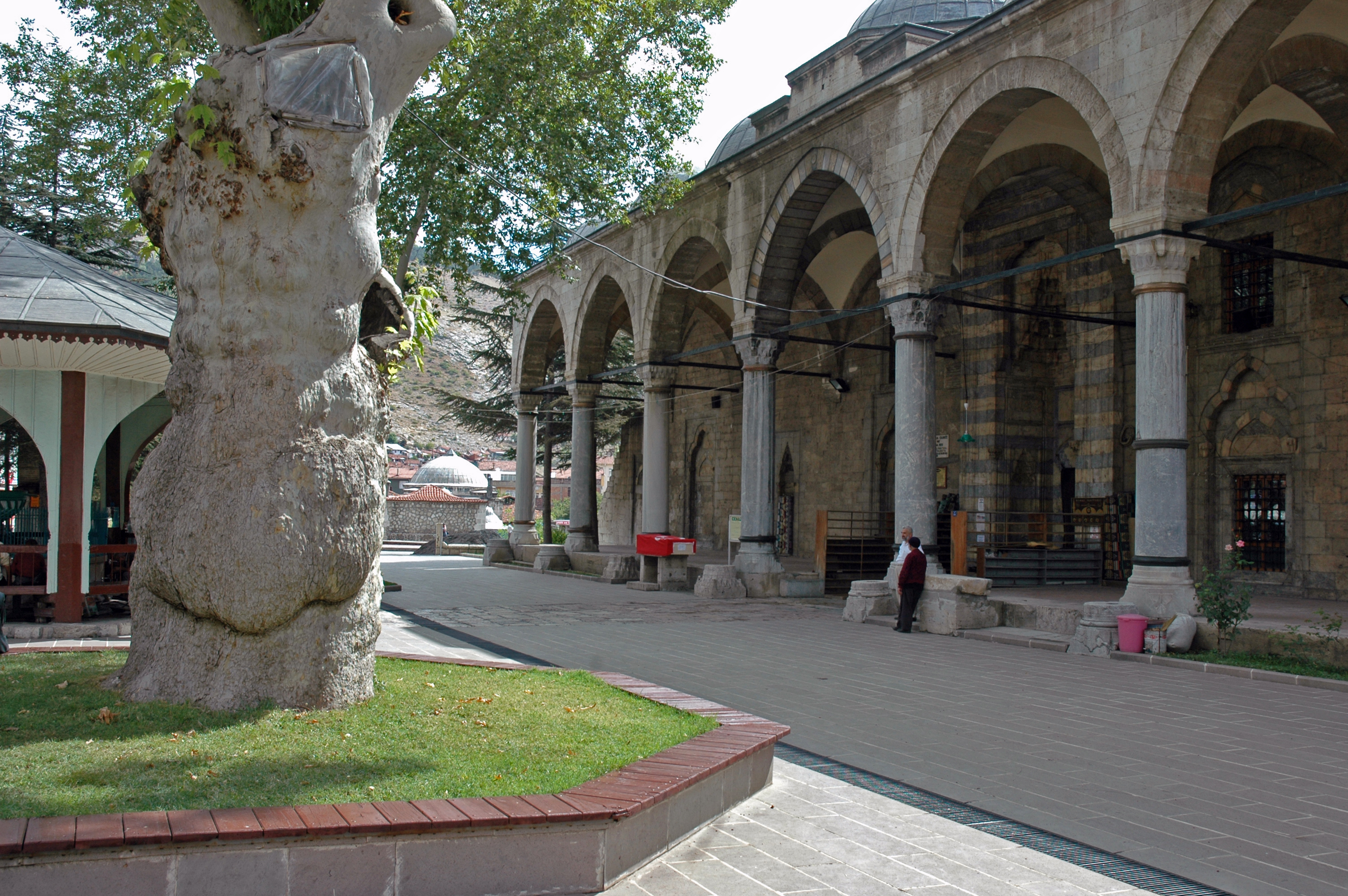
Tokat Ali Pasha Mosque

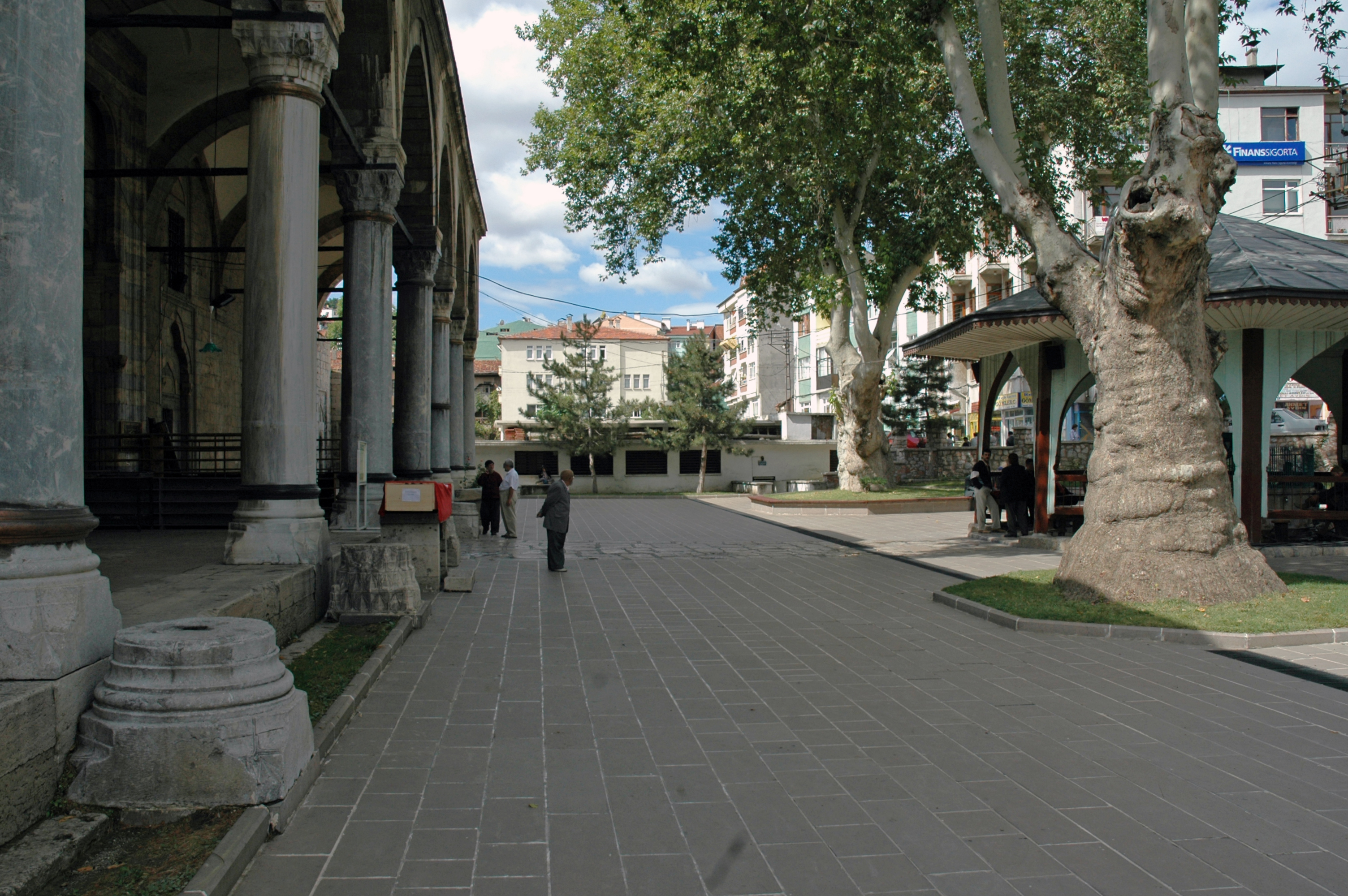
Tokat Ali Pasha Mosque View along side

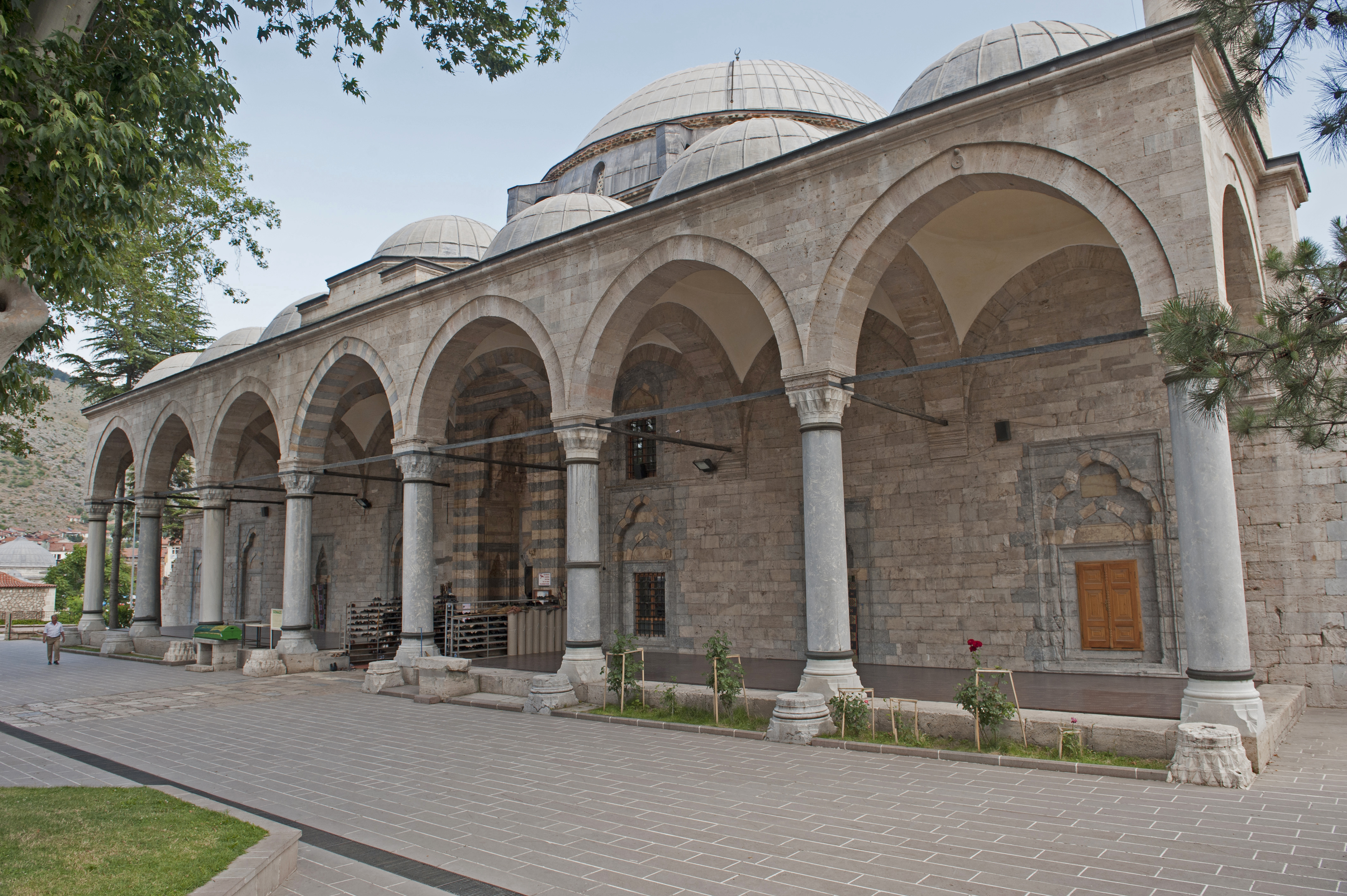
Tokat Ali Pasha Mosque View along side

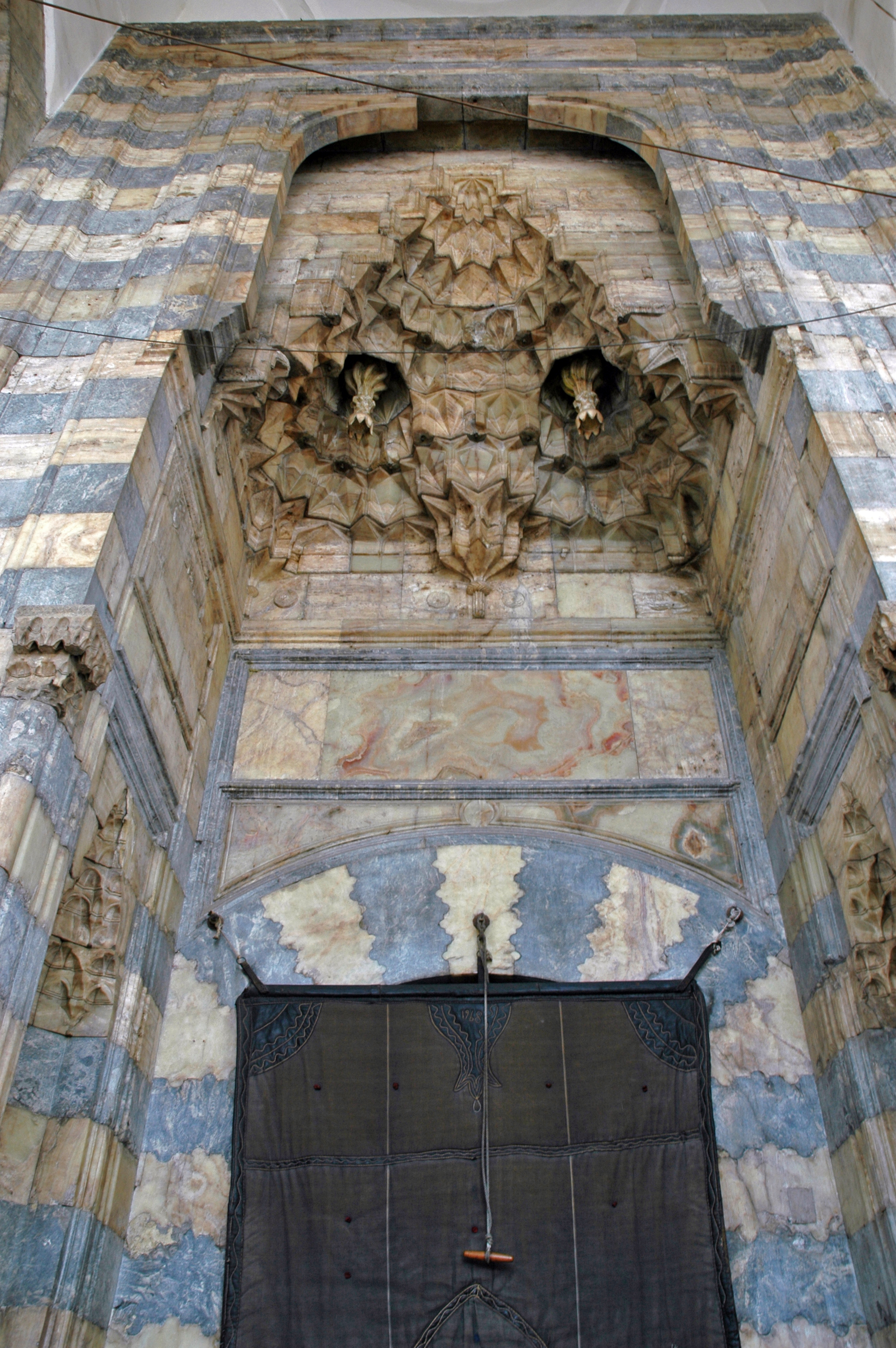
Tokat Ali Pasha Mosque Entrance

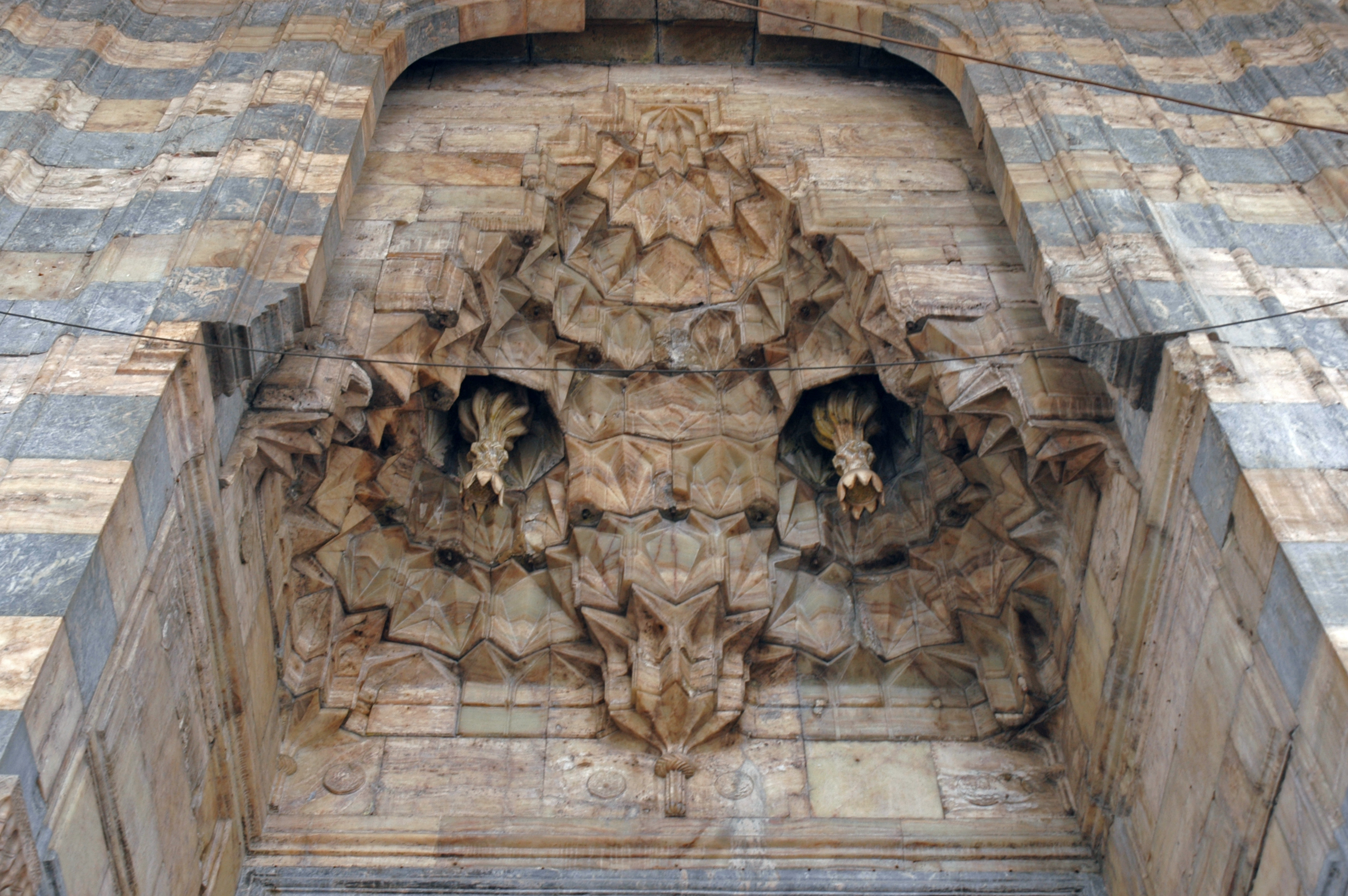
Tokat Ali Pasha Mosque Entrance

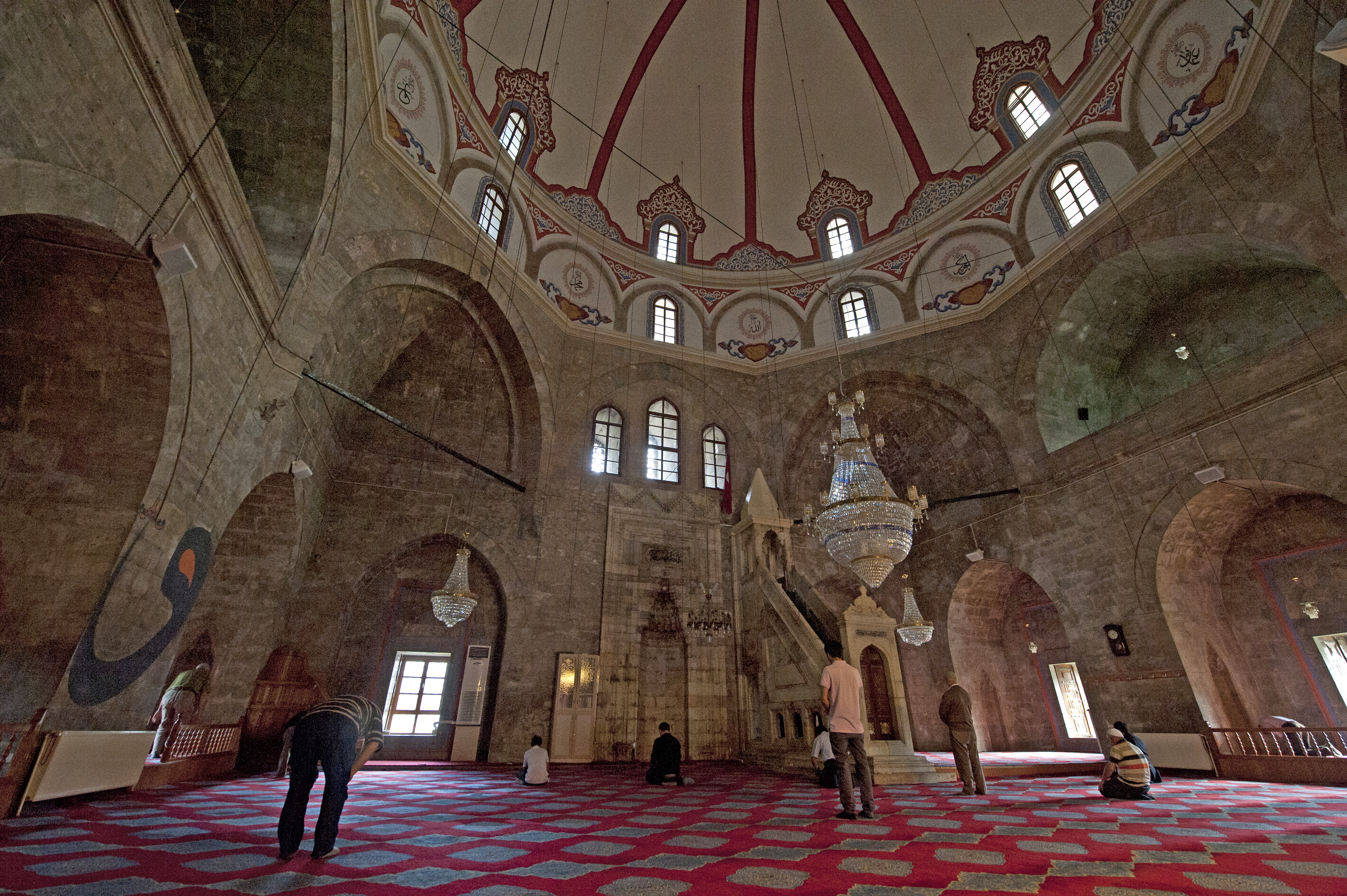
Tokat Ali Pasha Mosque Interior

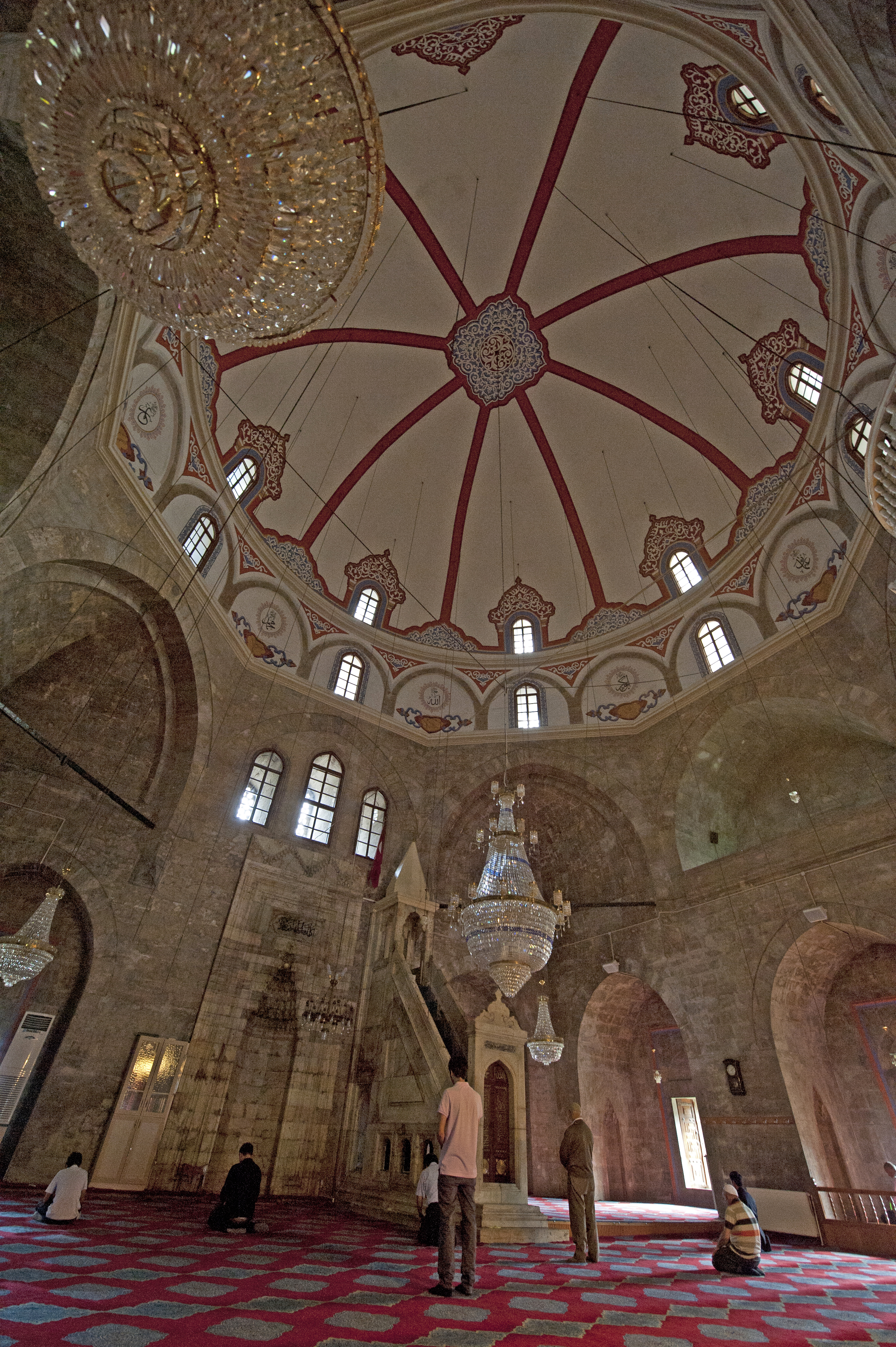
Tokat Ali Pasha Mosque Interior

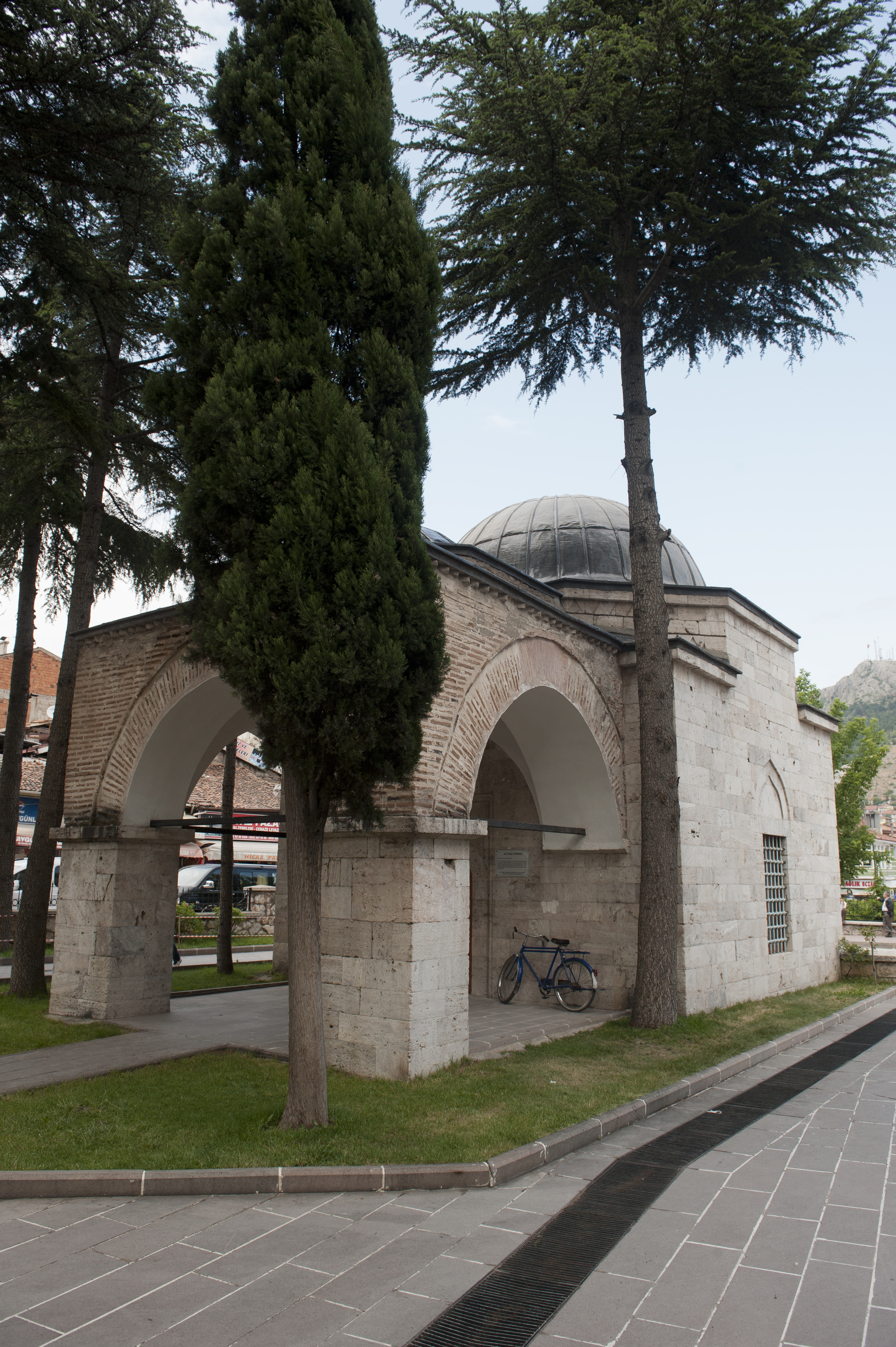
Tokat Ali Pasha Mosque Mausoleum
