= Giacomo Lomellini =

Doge of the Republic of Genoa

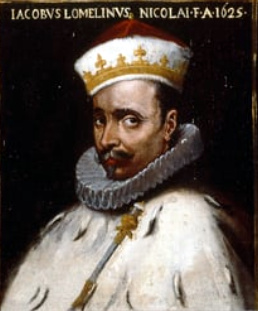

97th Doge of the Republic of Genoa
- In office June 16, 1625 – June 25, 1627
- Preceded by: Federico De Franchi Toso
- Succeeded by: Giovanni Luca Chiavari

Personal details
- Born: 1570 Genoa, Republic of Genoa
- Died: 1652 (aged 81–82) Genoa, Republic of Genoa

Giacomo Lomellini (Genoa, 1570 – Genoa, April 1, 1652) was the 97th Doge of the Republic of Genoa.

== Biography ==
Lomellini was born in Genoa, in 1570, to Nicolò Lomellini and Battina de Candia, from a family with a historical lineage of Lombard leaders settled in Liguria.

His election as doge took place in a particular period for the Republic of Genoa. From March 1625 the first signs of hostility began, which in a few months resulted in a real war between the Republic and the Duchy of Savoy of Charles Emmanuel I, supported by Kingdom of France of Louis XIII. During his dogate, the fifty-second in biennial succession and the ninety-seventh in republican history, for obvious reasons he had to deal mainly with the defense of Genoa and the Ligurian territory following the path initially started by his predecessor. After a rapid strengthening of the fortifications of Genoa, Savona and Gavi, he was almost forced by the forces on the field to forge a military alliance with the Spanish Empire.

In addition to defending the borders, Doge Lomellini had to face the numerous internal unrest of those territories and populations, with drastic repressions, which, taking advantage of the Savoy-Genoese conflict, expressed their dissensions over economic and social issues, including what became known as the "conspiracy of the De Marini". Initially defeated in some clashes, the Spanish-Genoese soldiers managed to change the situation in their favor so much that in October 1625 the most critical and difficult phase could be considered overcome with the development, among other things, of the not yet occurred ceremony of coronation of the doge on 4 October. A ceremony which, given the recent Genoese successes, consequently enhanced the figure of the crowned doge Giacomo Lomellini among civil, religious, poetic and people's prayers who now saw him as the new "savior of the homeland".

Averted a continuation of hostilities with the Duchy of Savoy, Doge Lomellini was able to implement a coveted and precious defense project of the capital: the construction of a mighty city wall from the San Benigno hill to the mouth of the Bisagno stream, a work that was the basis of the so-called "New Walls". On December 7, 1626 the doge himself laid the foundation stone and in the following years there were numerous donations from individuals, corporations, and the arts, to which were added the new taxes specifically designed to support the expense, paid for the more from the middle and less wealthy classes. The sum collected, about 2,100,000 Genoese pounds, did not serve to cover the entire construction, but was still the basis for starting with the works. His term as Doge ended on 25 June 1627, and Giacomo Lomellini was elected from January 1628 to 1630 as head of the war magistrate. In 1634 he was at the office of the magistrate of Corsica and in 1637, and again in 1644, he led the commission of the State Inquisitor of the Republic of Genoa. In 1645 and until his death he took part in the direction of the renovation and modification of the Doge's Palace. Lomellini died in Genoa on April 1, 1652.

== Personal life ==
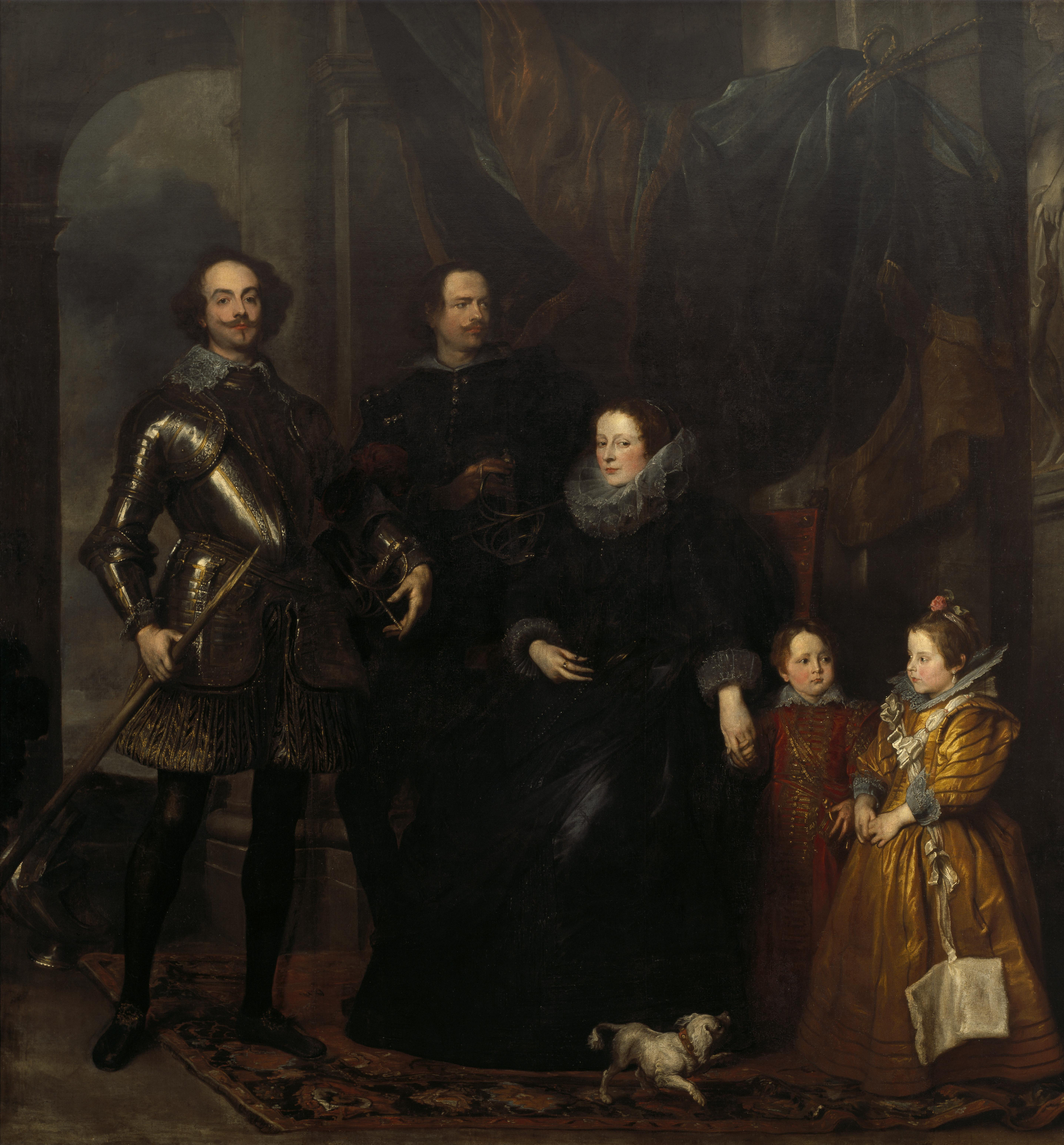
Anthony van Dyck's Portrait of the Lomellini Family, 1623

Lomellini was married four times: In his first marriage to Violante Pinelli he had five children: Nicolò, Battina, Giovan Francesco and Giovanna; from his second wife Barbara Spinola, he had two children: Vittoria and Agostino; And from the third marriage with Maddalena Grillo only one daughter, Teresa. He married a fourth and last time with Pellegra Spinola.

Lomellini was a supporter of the Republic of Genoa.

== See also ==
- Republic of Genoa
- Doge of Genoa
