= Abu l-Hasan Ali I =

- Possessor of the Kingdom of Tunis

Bey of Tunis
- Reign: 1735 – 1756
- Predecessor: Al-Husayn I ibn Ali
- Successor: Muhammad I ar-Rashid
- Born: Abu l-Hasan Ali I Bey; 30 June 1688; El Kef, Tunisia
- Died: 22 September 1756 (aged 68); Le Bardo, Kingdom of Tunisia
- Burial: Ali Pacha Mausoleum, Tunis, Tunisia
- Spouse: Aisha Bey
- Issue: Younes Bey; Mouhammed Bey; Slimane Bey; Lalla Traki Beya
Names
- Ali Ben Mohammed Ben Ali
- Dynasty: Husainides
- Father: Mohamed Bey
- Religion: Islam

Abu l-Hasan Ali I
- Royal Family of Tunisia

Abu l-Hasan Ali I (Arabic: أبو الحسن علي الأول), commonly referred to as Ali I Bey (Arabic: علي باي الأول ; 30 June 1688 – 22 September 1756)) was the second leader of the Husainid Dynasty and the ruler of Tunisia from 1735 to 1756.

== Biography ==
He was a grandson of Ali Turki, governor of Kef, and the nephew of Husayn I Bey. After the latter came to power in 1705, he was appointed governor of Sousse and then named heir apparent (1706). In 1724 he obtained the title of pasha from the Ottoman sultan.

Two years later, Husayn replaced him as heir with his son Muhammad; Ali therefore revolted, and, with the help of the dey of Algiers, defeated Husayn in 1735. Soon after his entrance in Tunis, however, he was forced to pay a large indemnity to the Algerian troops camped under the city's walls, amounting to the load of 35 mules in silver, and to promise a yearly tribute of 50,000 rials to the dey.

Husayn fled to Kairouan and tried to continue governing in Sousse and the Tunisian Sahel. Ali ordered his son Younes to besiege him. Husayn was captured and executed in 1740, but the latter's sons, Muhammad and Ali, fled and continued the civil war, one from Constantine and the other from Algiers.

In 1741 Ali conquered the island of Tabarka from the Republic of Genoa, deporting 1,500 Christians to Tunis. In the same year he sent an expedition against the French Cap Nègre, which was captured by his son Younes. The French attempted to capture Tabarka in 1742, but were repelled.

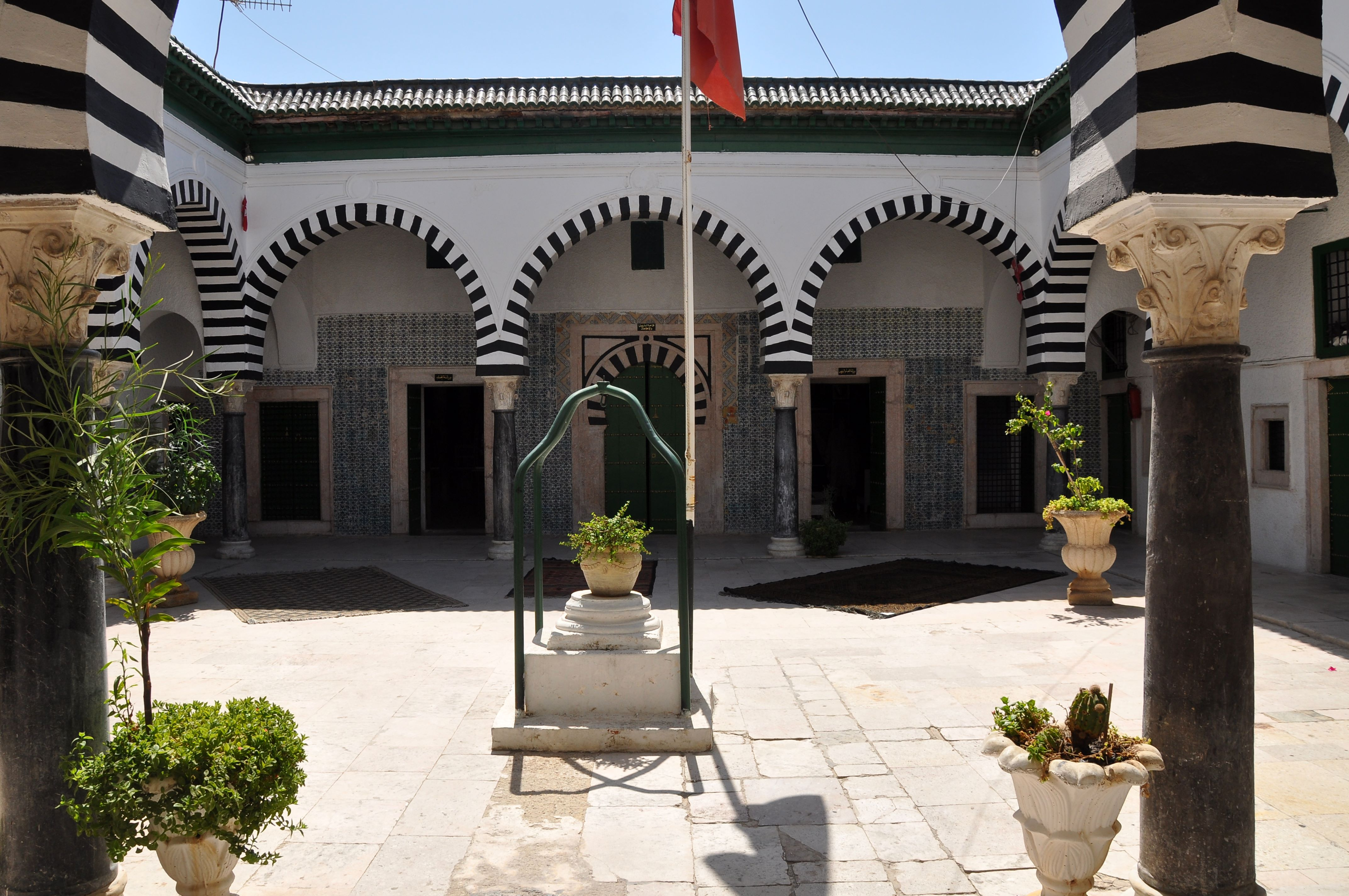
Madrasa El Bachia

In his later years, Ali had to face two rebellions. The first one was that led by Younes himself, who was able to seize Tunis, having the local authorities proclaim him bey. Ali besieged him in the citadel and forced him to flee to Algiers. The second came from the sons of Husayn, who were able to gain support from the dey of Algiers and invaded Tunisia with an army led by the dey of Constantine. The army reached Tunis, whose walls Ali had restored and strengthened with a ditch in the meantime. However, this did not prevent the Algerians from storming the city on 31 August 1756. Ali was deposed on 2 September and brought in chains to Algiers, where he was stripped naked and strangled twenty days later by partisans of his successor Muhammad I ar-Rashid.

== See also ==
- Muhammad al-Warghi

Regnal titles
Preceded by Al-Husayn I ibn Ali at-Turki	Bey of Tunis; 1735–1756	Succeeded by Muhammad I ar-Rashid
