= Delle Piane =

Delle Piane is a name of Genova and the Val Polcevera.

- Delle Piane family, Italian noble family

== Origin ==
A very ancient topographic name deriving from the medieval name “de Planis” deriving from the Latin form of Planum (meaning level ground, plain). Delle Piane “the dweller at the Plain” was the name for someone who lived on the plain of Genova and of the Val Polcevera; the name may derive from the place name where the family held land or from a manor house held or where they had a religious dwelling in the medieval ages.

== Heraldry ==
Several branches of the Delle Piane family were conferred the title of nobility of Nobile (aristocracy) and Dominus (title) in the renaissance. The name also served as feudal and noble Italian titles in other spellings in the rare forms of Conte del Piano of the Contea del Piano, Barone del Piano and Barone della Piana, the feudal castle Palazzo della Piana (meaning of the lands, landholder).

Coat of Arms: Blue, with the Fortuna goddess standing on a globe or a wheel of fortune, Coronet with 8 pearls (5 visible) of the title of nobility of Nobile (aristocracy), sometimes shortened with a “N.H.” prefix before the first name of each male descendant or “N.D.” for females.

== Variants ==
Dellepiane, Della Piana, Del Piano, De Pian, Delpiano, Dellipiani

== Correspondences in other languages ==
To the Genovese name Delle Piane and its derivatives correspond to the English name of Plain (from Plan), the French De la Plaine, and Spanish De los Llanos.

== Famous Delle Pianes ==
Several soldiers, captains, knights, generals, elders, abbots, landowners, nobles and politicians carried the name.

- Giovanni Maria delle Piane (il Mulinaretto) (1660–1745), Court Painter
- Luis delle Piane (1865–1941), General
- Giovanni Battista Dellepiane (1889–1961), Archbishop
- Carlo delle Piane (1936-), Artist
- Emanuelle delle Piane (1963-), Artist
- Immanuel Dellepiane (1967-), Artist, Sculpture ( USA, Miami )
