= Great Council =

Great Council can refer to:

- Cantonal Council of Zürich, until 1869 the Grosser Mouse ('Great Council')
- Conseil du Roi (France)
- Great Council of Mechelen
- Great Council of Venice
- Magnum Concilium (England)
- Great Council of Genoa
