= Vincenzo Durazzo =

Doge of the Republic of Genoa and king of Corsica

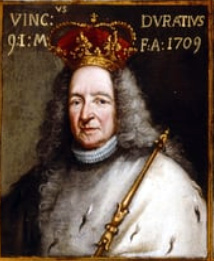

140th Doge of the Republic of Genoa
- In office September 14, 1709 – September 14, 1711
- Preceded by: Domenico Maria De Mari
- Succeeded by: Francesco Maria Imperiale

Personal details
- Born: 1635 Genoa, Republic of Genoa
- Died: February 29, 1724 (aged 88–89) Genoa, Republic of Genoa

Vincenzo Durazzo (Genoa, 1635 – Genoa, 29 February 1724) was the 140th Doge of the Republic of Genoa and king of Corsica.

== Biography ==
With a very large majority of the votes, the Grand Council elected Vincenzo Durazzo as the new Doge of the Republic on 14 September 1709, the ninety-fifth in biennial succession and the one hundred and forty-fourth in republican history. On 23 November, the solemn coronation took place in the Cathedral of San Lorenzo in the presence of the bishop of the Diocese of Aleria Monsignor Raffaele Raggi who from 1705 had assumed the role after the death of the doge's brother, Monsignor Mario Emmanuele Durazzo. As doge he was also invested with the related biennial office of king of Corsica. After the end of his dogate, Durazzo continued to serve the Genoese state as dean of Maritime affairs. Elected from among the perpetual procurators, he died in Genoa on 29 February 1724 where he was buried inside the church of Nostra Signora della Consolazione.

== See also ==
- Republic of Genoa
- Doge of Genoa
- Durazzo family
