= Giovanni Battista Dellepiane =

Italian prelate

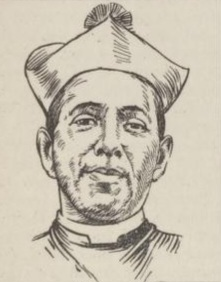
Giovanni Battista Dellepiane

Giovanni Battista Dellepiane (21 February 1889 – 13 August 1961) was an Italian prelate of the Catholic Church. He spent his career in the diplomatic service of the Holy See, including nineteen years leading the Vatican's mission to the Belgian Congo.

== Biography ==
Giovanni Battista Dellepiane was born in Genoa on 21 February 1889. He was ordained a priest on 25 July 1914.

On 18 July 1929, when he was already serving as the Apostolic Administrator of the Archdiocese of İzmir, Turkey, Pope Pius named him titular archbishop of Stauropolis. He received his episcopal consecration from Cardinal Willem van Rossum on 30 November 1929.

On 18 January 1930, Pope Pius named him its first Apostolic Delegate to the Belgian Congo (later the Democratic Republic of the Congo). He received a noble title in 1947 from Mutara III, King of Rwanda.

On 12 January 1949, Pope Pius XII appointed him Apostolic Internuncio to Austria.

He died on 13 August 1961.

== See also ==
- Catholic Church in Africa
- Delle Piane family
