= Francesco Maria Imperiale =

Doge of the Republic of Genoa and king of Corsica

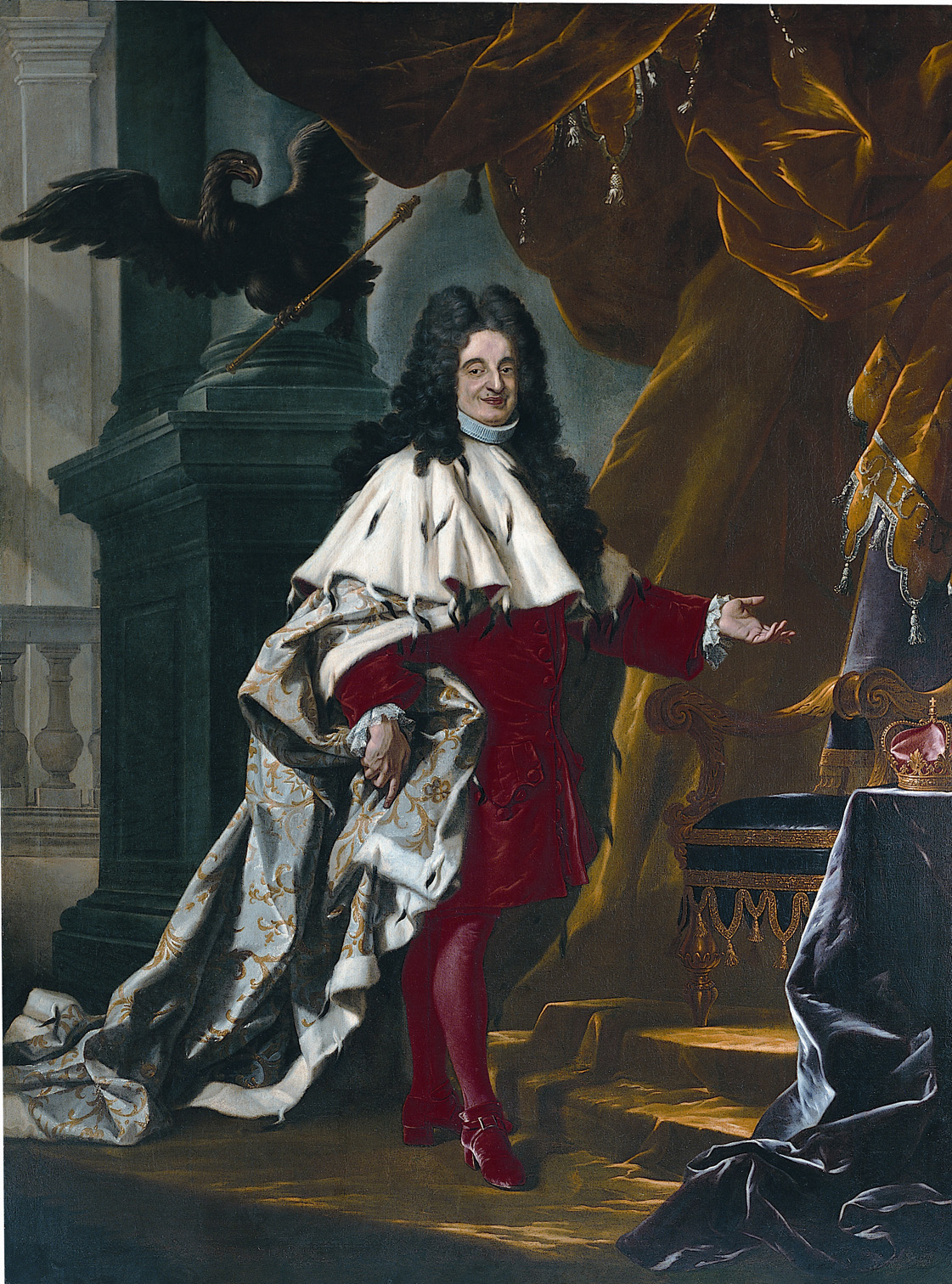
- Portrait by Giovanni Maria delle Piane

141st Doge of the Republic of Genoa
- In office 22 September 1711 – 22 September 1713
- Preceded by: Vincenzo Durazzo
- Succeeded by: Giovanni Antonio Giustiniani

Personal details
- Born: 21 August 1653 Sampierdarena, Genoa, Republic of Genoa
- Died: 4 August 1736 (aged 82) Sampierdarena, Genoa, Republic of Genoa

Francesco Maria Imperiale (Sampierdarena, 21 August 1653 – Sampierdarena, 4 August 1736) was the 141st Doge of the Republic of Genoa and king of Corsica.

== Biography ==
Son of Gian Giacomo Imperiale and Livia Salvago, and member of the noble Imperiale family, Francesco Maria was born in 1653.

Senator of the Republic in 1697 and member of the Major Council from 1709 to 1711, Francesco Maria Imperiale was elected doge of the Republic of Genoa on 22 September 1711, the ninety-sixth in two-year succession and the one hundred and forty-first in republican history. As doge he was also invested with the related biennial office of king of Corsica. For the dogal appointment he had to renounce the feudal possessions of the "State of Sant'Angelo" - including Sant'Angelo dei Lombardi, Nusco, the lands of Lioni, Andretta and Carbonara, which were administered by his brother Enrico in favor of his son Giulio.

He ended his term on 22 September 1713. He probably still fulfilled other public assignments until his death in the Villa Imperiale Scassi of Sampierdarena on 4 August 1736. He was buried in the basilica of San Siro. He was married to Silvia Centurione Oltremarini.

== See also ==
- Republic of Genoa
- Doge of Genoa
