= Giovanni Antonio Giustiniani =

Doge of the Republic of Genoa

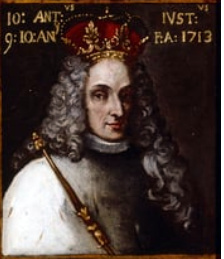

142nd Doge of the Republic of Genoa
- In office 22 September 1713 – 22 September 1715
- Preceded by: Francesco Maria Imperiale
- Succeeded by: Lorenzo Centurione

Personal details
- Born: 1607 Madrid, Spanish Empire
- Died: 1672 (aged 64–65) Genoa, Republic of Genoa

Giovanni Antonio Giustiniani (Madrid, 1676 - Genoa, 1735) was the 142nd Doge of the Republic of Genoa and king of Corsica.

== Biography ==
Member of the noble Giustiniani family, he was born in Madrid around 1676. The elections of 22 September 1713 elected him new doge of the Republic of Genoa, the ninety-seventh in biennial succession and the one hundred and forty-second in republican history. As doge he was also invested with the related biennial office of king of Corsica. Giustiniani ended his term on 22 September 1715 and died in Genoa in 1735.

== See also ==
- Republic of Genoa
- Doge of Genoa
