= Giovanni Maria delle Piane =

Italian painter (1660–1745)

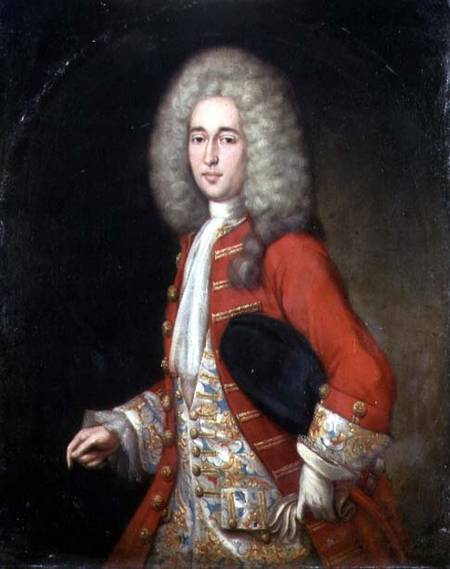
- Self-portrait, il Molinaretto, 17th century, Private Collection.
- Born: 1660; Genoa
- Died: 28 June 1745 (84–85); Monticelli d’Ongina near Piacenza
- Known for: Painting
- Movement: Baroque

Giovanni Maria delle Piane (1660 – 28 June 1745) was an aristocratic Genovese who served as primary court painter for over 60 years in the late-Baroque period. He is also known as "il Molinaretto".

== Biography ==
Giovanni Maria was born in Genoa, Italy, and was the son of Giovanni Battista delle Piane, from the noble house Delle Piane. He was nicknamed the "Molinaretto" as his grandparents, renowned land owners from Polcevera, had watermills (from Italian molino, watermill). From the age of 10 till 16 years, he apprenticed with Giovanni Battista Merano, then he transferred to Rome to work under the famed fresco painter, Giovanni Battista Gaulli (il Baciccio), who held him like a son. The Genoese painter Enrico Vaymer was a fellow student and lifelong friend. In the Roman studio of Gaulli, Piane copied the works of great masters like Giulio Romano, Guido Reni, Annibale Carracci and Domenichino. These copies brought him acclaim. At Gaulli's studio, he also painted portraits. In 1684, he returned to Genoa, where the main portrait artist in the city, Giovanni Battista Carlone, had just died.

He gained loyalty from other peer aristocratic families, noting he adapted to the new sensitivity, with attention to the fashion of his subjects, styling them with "majestic and elegant drapes taking them in certain new and witty movements". In 1695, by invitation of Count Morando, he completed a first journey to Parma, the city where his former master G.B. Merano was recently active. He found clients in the Farnesian cities and also in Genoa. He moved frequently among the cities of Emilia and Liguria, also painting sacred subjects. In 1705 the Cardinal Alberoni, sent by the Duke Francesco Farnese, assigned the artist, who seemed to be residing in Piacenza at that moment, to portray the Duke of Vendôme, commander of the Franco-Spanish troops. In 1706 the artist was again in Parma, commissioned to portray Duke Francesco, the Duchess Dorotea Sophia and the young Princess Elisabetta Farnese, Princess of Parma. Two years after he made the portrait of Elisabeth Christine of Brunswick-Wolfenbüttel. He also traveled a few times to Milan.

In 1709 he portrays Prince Antonio Farnese and the same year, he was nominated Court Painter in Parma from where, he returned to Genoa. On April 21, 1711, Piane became the personal painter of Princess Elisabeth, receiving a stipend, including food and accommodation. He still held that commission in 1737. Between 1714 and 1715 he portrayed Princess Elisabeth when she married King Philip V of Spain, from 1715 until 1737, he mainly resided with the royal family in Piacenza. In 1719 he was invited to go to Spain, probably by Princess Elisabeth, as she considered him as a trustable portraitist, but the journey was never undertaken. Though already elder in 1737, he relocated to Naples, where he was retained for some years as court painter for the young king Charles III of Spain, already duke of Parma and his wife Maria Amalia of Saxony. During those years two of his feminine portraits were presented at the Florentine exhibition of the academy of drawing.

In June 1741 he left Naples to return to his native Genoa. There he still painted portraits for the local aristocracy and finally, in 1744 he retired to Monticelli d’Ongina, near Piacenza, where he died on 28 June 1745.

He was prolific during his long artistic career. The style first works link him with the school of Genoese portraiture beginning with Van Dyck led to Carlone. His portraiture technique employs robust incisiveness in the face of the subjects, with a decorative exuberance superimposed upon the opulent scenography with meticulous attention to aristocratic garb and particular artifacts of the subject's family.

The artist's master portraits are conserved in the Royal Palace of Madrid and in Caserta Palace's collection of royal family portraits. He was esteemed for his distinguished art, such as Godfrey Kneller and Anthony van Dyck in Italy.

His son, Giovanni Andrea delle Piane, who died in 1759 while in his 80s, was also a painter of portraits and student of his father. Among his pupils were Giovanni Battista Grondona and Carl'Antonio Durante (died 1712).

== Gallery ==
Francesco Maria Imperiale

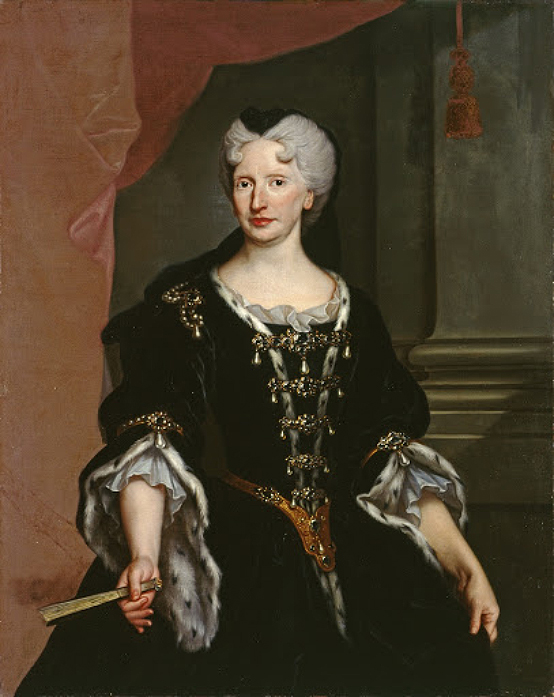
Portrait of Countess Palatine Dorothea Sophie of Neuburg (1670-1748) as a widow

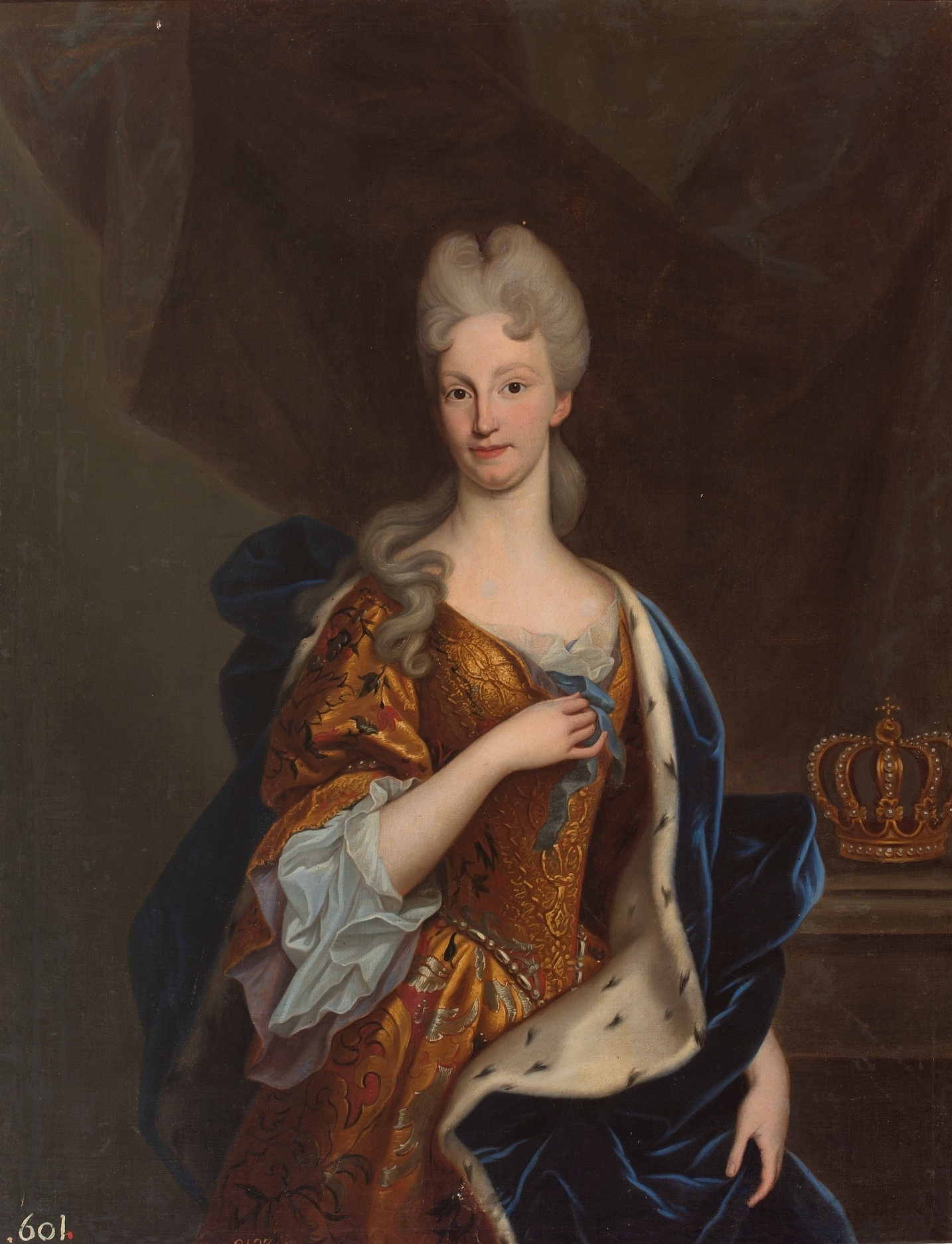
Portrait of Queen Isabel of Spain, wife of Philip V

== See also ==
- Piane family
