= Luis Dellepiane =

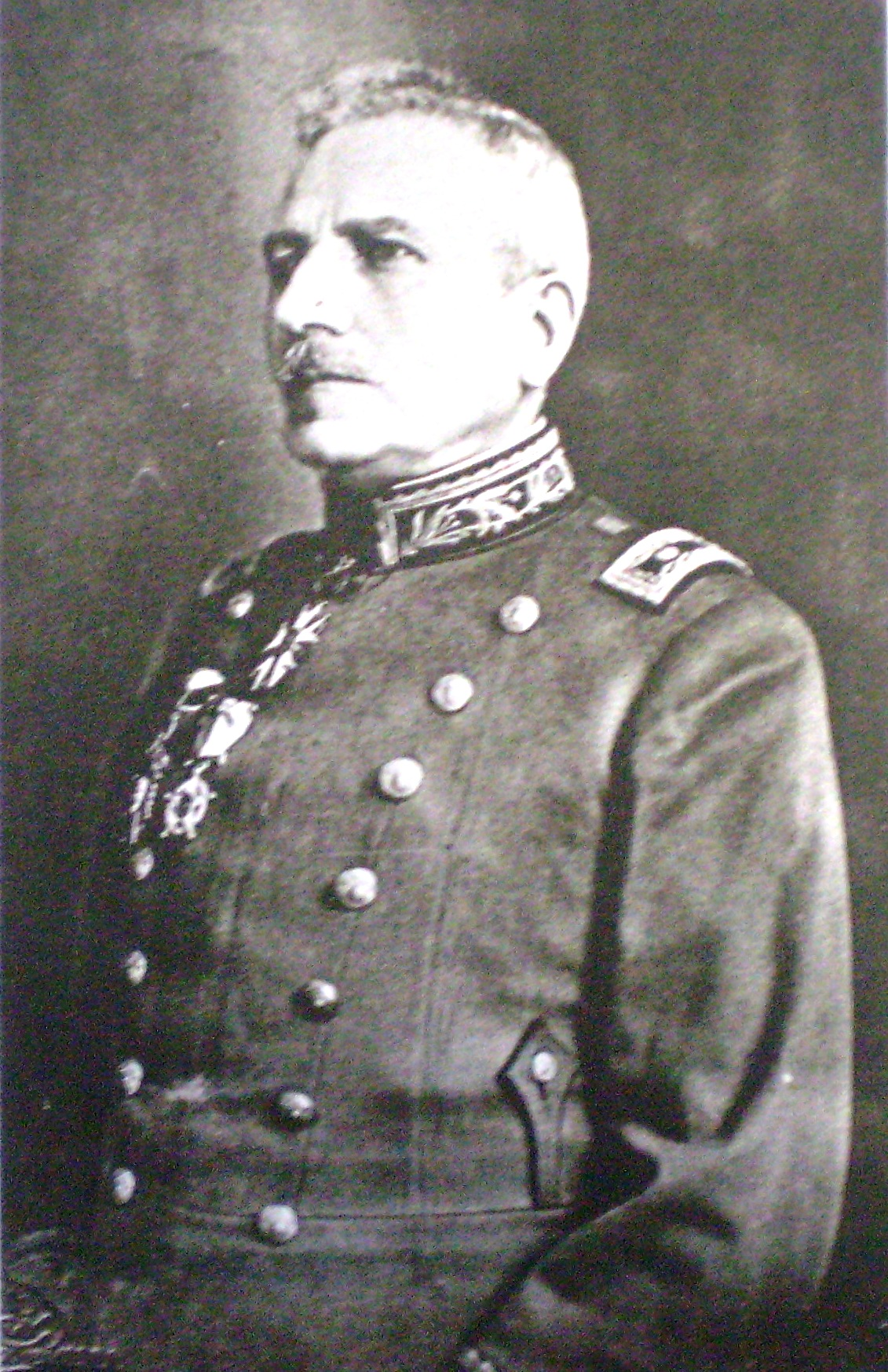
- Born: April 26, 1865; Buenos Aires, Argentina
- Died: August 14, 1941 (aged 76); Federal, Entre Ríos, Argentina
- Military career
- Allegiance: Argentina
- Branch: Argentine Army
- Rank: Commander
- Conflicts: Tragic Week

General Luis J. Dellepiane (26 April 1865 – 14 August 1941), born in Buenos Aires, was a civil engineer, militarist and politician of Argentina.

With the title of Lieutenant General he participated in the politics linked to the Radical Civic Union (UCR) following Hipólito Yrigoyen. In 1919, the president designated him Head of the Federal Police during the Tragic Week.

In 1928, together with Yrigoyen, he served as minister of war and commanded the second division of the Argentine army stationed in Campo de Mayo. In September 1930 he resigned from the post.

Dellepiane was also a civil engineer. He had a career in university, becoming vice-dean of the school of sciences, physics and nature, where he taught students from 1909. He also was a member of the superior council of the national University of Buenos Aires. He is considered the father of geodesy of Argentina for his work on the science. He was an avid man of the sciences and a member of number of the national academy of sciences, physics and nature.

== See also ==
- Delle Piane family
