= Doge's Palace, Genoa =

Historical building in Genoa, Italy

Doge's Palace of Genoa
- Palazzo Ducale di Genova
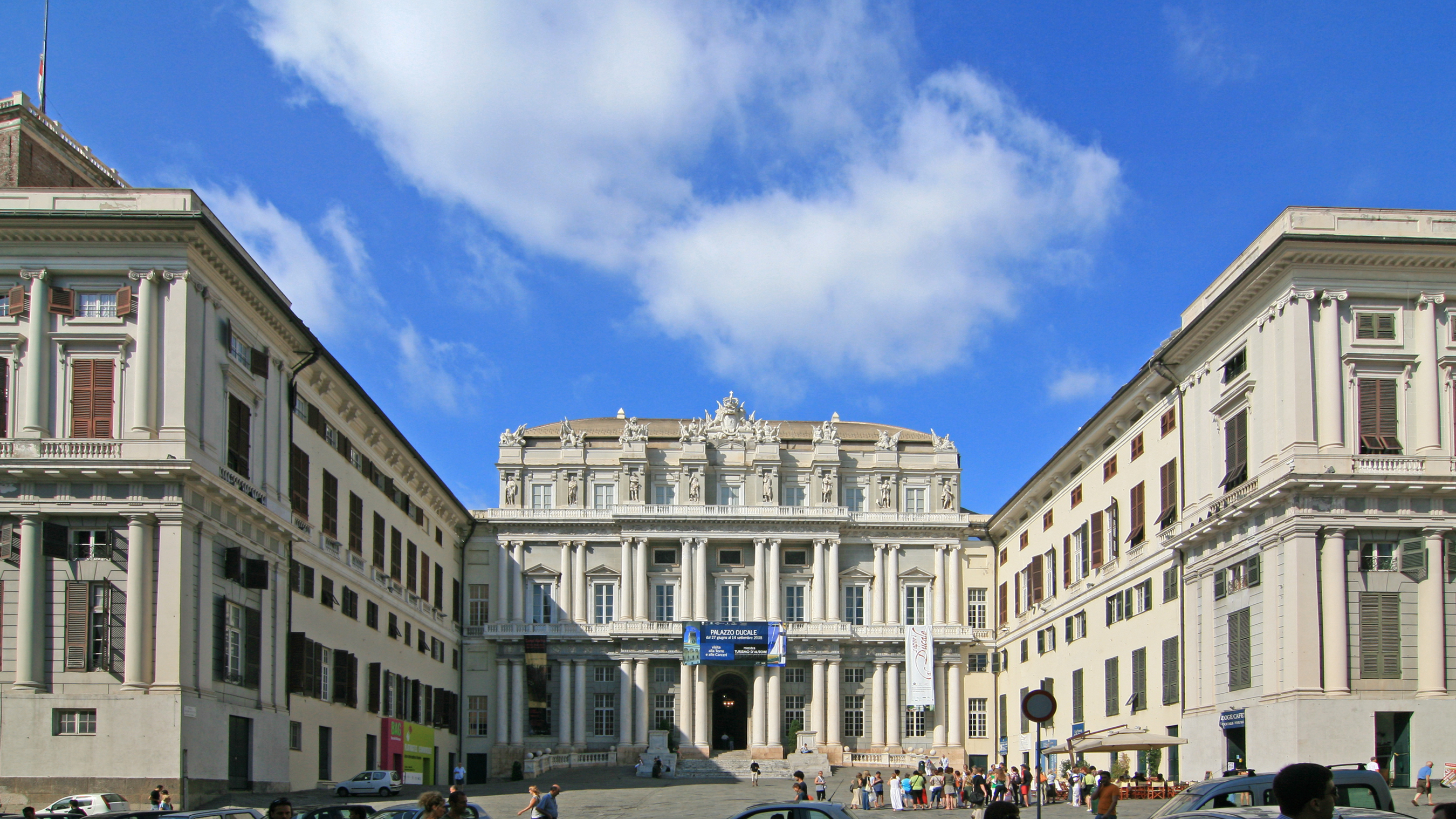
- The Palace of the Doges view from Piazza Giacomo Matteotti.

- Location within Italy

General information
- Status: Now used as a museum
- Type: Palace
- Architectural style: Neoclassical
- Location: Genoa, Italy, Piazza Giacomo Matteotti 9, 16123
- Coordinates: 44.4075°N 8.9334°E
- Opened: 1339
- Client: Republic of Genoa

Technical details
- Floor count: 3

Design and construction
- Architects: Andrea Ceresola; Simone Cantoni

Website
- Official Website of the Palace of the Doges of Genoa (in Italian)

The Doge's Palace (Italian: Palazzo Ducale) is a historical building in Genoa, northwest Italy.

Once the home of the doges of Genoa, it is now a museum and a centre for cultural events and arts exhibitions. It is situated in the heart of the city, with two different entrances and façades, the main one on Piazza Giacomo Matteotti, and the second one on Piazza De Ferrari.

== History ==
The construction of the Doge's Palace began at the end of the 13th century, when Genoa was gradually consolidating its military and economic power in the Mediterranean. At that time the city was organized according as the "Compagna Communis" (the official name of the Republic in the time), which provided for the appointment of the Capitano del popolo, as the head of state of Genoa. Until 1291, however, the highest officials and other representatives of the Municipality did not have their own headquarters but were housed in the Archbishop's Palace, or in nearby private homes belonging to the Doria and Fieschi families.

In 1291 the "Capitani del popolo" Corrado Doria and Oberto Spinola bought the buildings owned by the Doria family, and three years later the adjacent palace of Alberto Fieschi was also purchased, equipped with a tower later called "Grimaldina", already used as a seat by the Capitani del popolo since 1272 due to the exile of Fieschi. The merger led to the construction of the abbots' palace.

The palace, which with the appointment in 1339 of the first Genoese doge Simone Boccanegra had taken the name of "ducale", underwent a series of transformations starting from the second half of the 14th century at the behest of the Doge Antoniotto Adorno. The building was enlarged with the addition of new buildings to the east, to form a sort of "C" around today's Piazza Umberto I, and to the north, to occupy a space corresponding to the current central body of the palace. The interventions wanted by Adorno did not change the main access to the building, which continued to be maintained on the Tommaso Reggio street.

A new important transformation took place towards the middle of the following century with the construction of the so-called "enceinte", a building intended to house the garrison that connected the east and west wings of Piazza Umberto I, effectively transforming the square into a courtyard fortified and making the palace a sort of citadel of power isolated from the rest of the city. The exact date of construction of the curtain is not known, but the appointment of a "captain of the palace gate" in 1470 suggests that its construction was finished at that time. With the construction of the new wing, the access from via Tommaso Reggio was closed and the new entrance was placed in the center of the new building.

In the 16th century the reforms wanted by Andrea Doria had changed the political structure of the city, which was then governed by a Great Council of four hundred senators and a Minor Council, while the doge was no longer elected for life but remained in office for only two years. The desire to have a seat that reflected the prestige and hierarchical organization of the Dogate, together with the need for a fortress that would keep the government safe from intrigues and coups d'état, led the senate to entrust in 1591 the architect Andrea Ceresola, known as "il Vannone", the task of completely renovating the building.

New important transformation works took place in 1778, after a violent fire destroyed a large part of the central body of the building on 3 November 1777, of which only the atrium on the ground floor and the staircase leading to it were saved. A competition was quickly launched for the reconstruction, in which Giacomo Maria Gaggini, Gregorio Petondi and Emanuele Andrea Tagliafichi, among the most famous architects active in Genoa in those years, were invited to participate. The competition was however won by the architect Simone Cantoni, who conceived a marble facade that represents one of the first examples of neoclassical style in Genoa. The reconstruction works took place between 1778 and 1783 under the supervision of Gaetano Cantoni and, in addition to the façade, involved the neoclassical reconstruction of the halls of the Great Council and Minor Council, whose wooden roofs had been damaged by the fire. The new roofs were made of bricks, to protect them from any new fires.

In 1815, the annexation of Genoa and Liguria to the Kingdom of Sardinia, marked the end of the Republic of Genoa and the palace lost its function as the seat of the government and its premises were used as courtrooms, offices and archives as a new seat of the judiciary, a role it continued to hold until 1975.

A new restoration campaign took place in the first decades of the 20th century by Orlando Grosso. His most important interventions concerned the elevations on via Tommaso Reggio, where the loggia of the abbots and other remains of medieval buildings that had been covered by a linear Mannerist facade by Vannone were brought to light, following the neo-medievalist policy in force at the time, and the facade on the Piazza De Ferrari, which was completely renovated and repainted.

In 1942 the building was partially damaged, in particular between the central body and the west wing, during one of the bombings of the city carried out by the Allies during World War II.

== Contemporary era ==
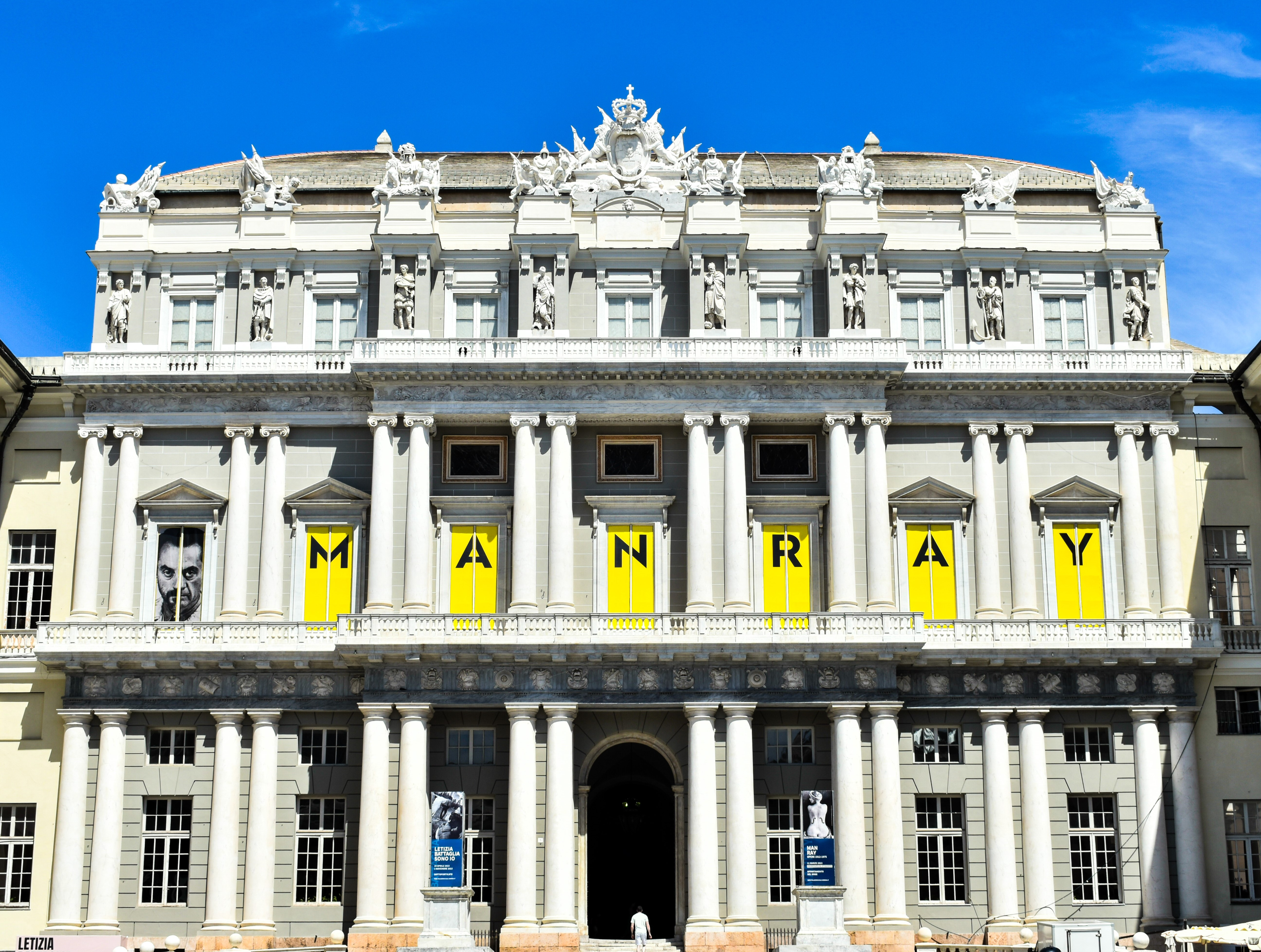
Art exhibition at the Doge's Palace, advertised across the façade on Piazza Umberto I in 2023

On the main floor, the so-called piano nobile, are the frescoed halls of the Maggior and Minor Consiglio, where many public events take place.

The Palace of the Doges was restored in 1992, in occasion of the celebrations of Christopher Columbus and the 500th anniversary of the discovery of the Americas.

Following the restoration, the palace was opened to the public and used as a museum and palace of culture. Since 8 February 2008, the palace is managed by the "Genoa Palazzo Ducale Foundation for Culture". In addition to some commercial activities, it periodically hosts events, conferences and important art exhibitions.

In July 2001 the palace hosted the G8 Summit.

== See also ==
- Republic of Genoa
- Doge of Genoa
- Great Council and Minor Council of Genoa

== Gallery ==
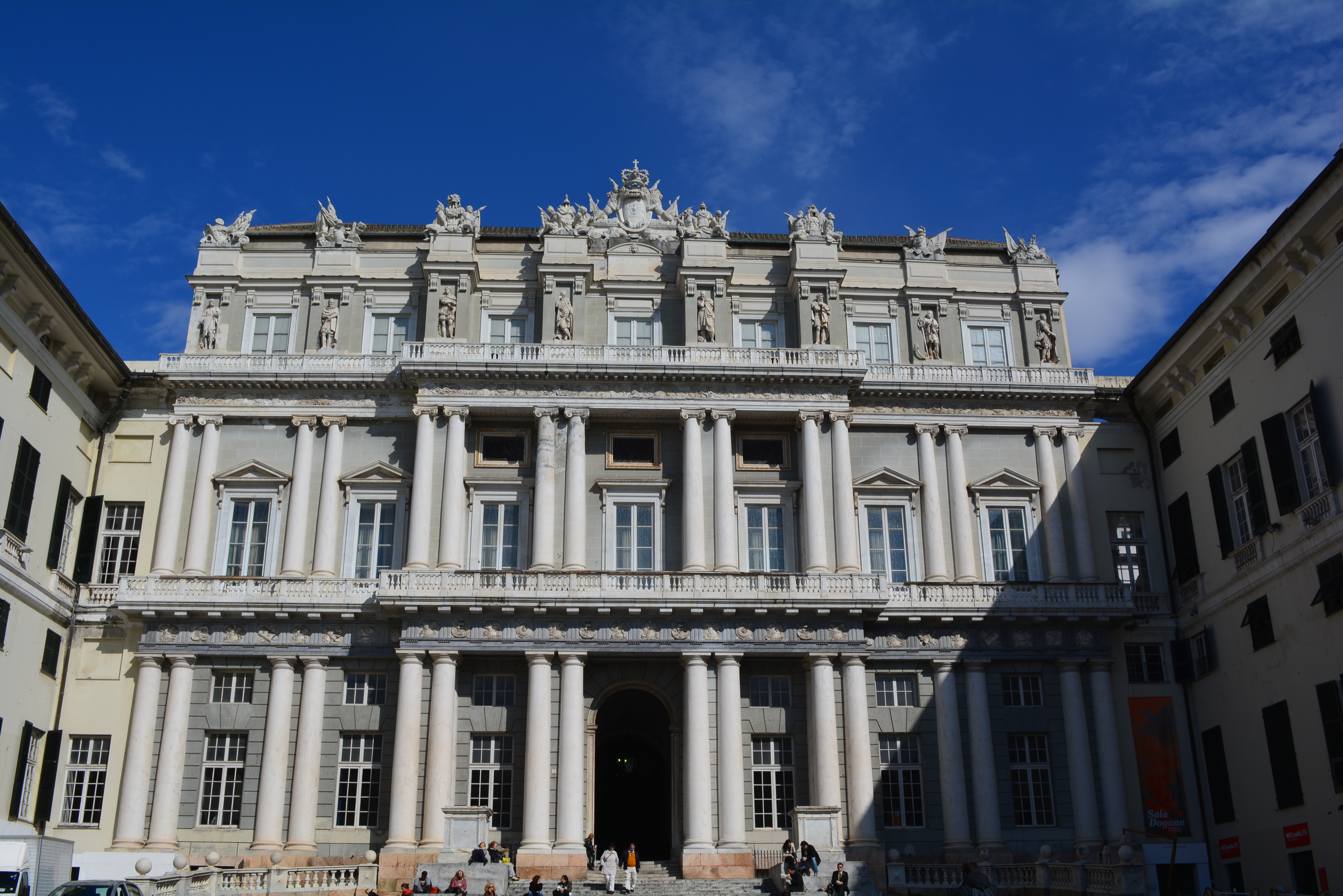
The neoclassical façade on Piazza Umberto I

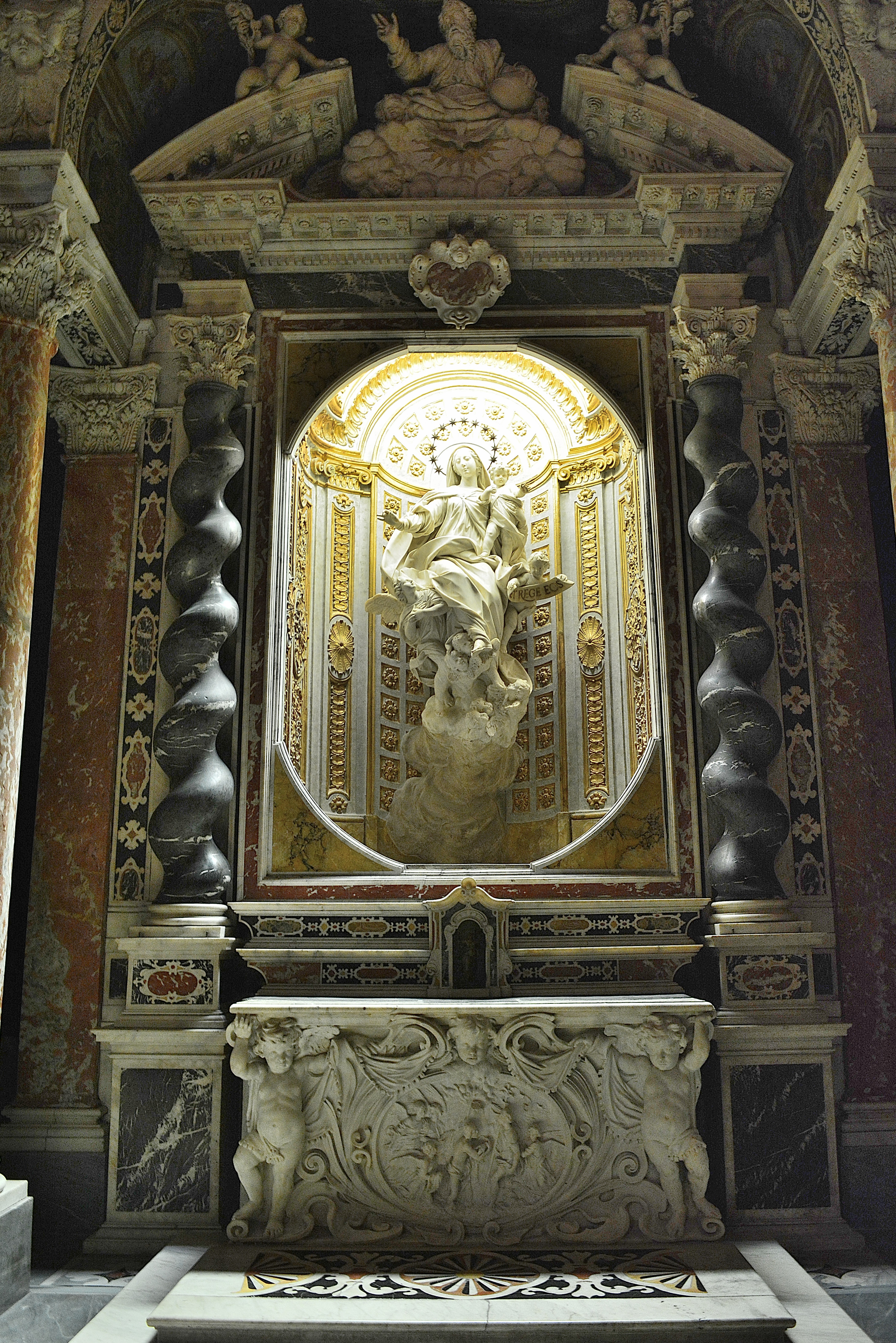
Altar of the chapel of the Palace

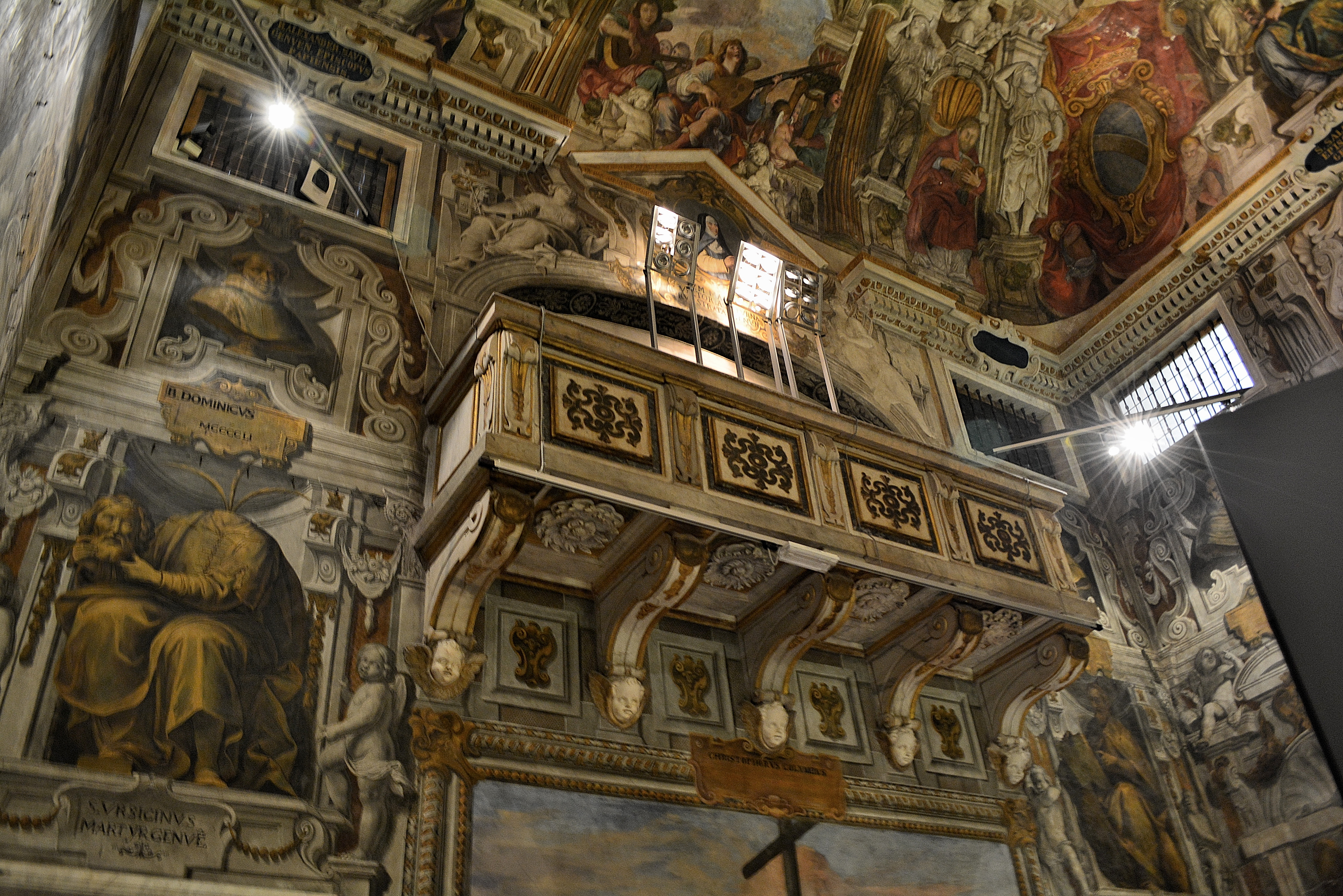
The palace's chapel

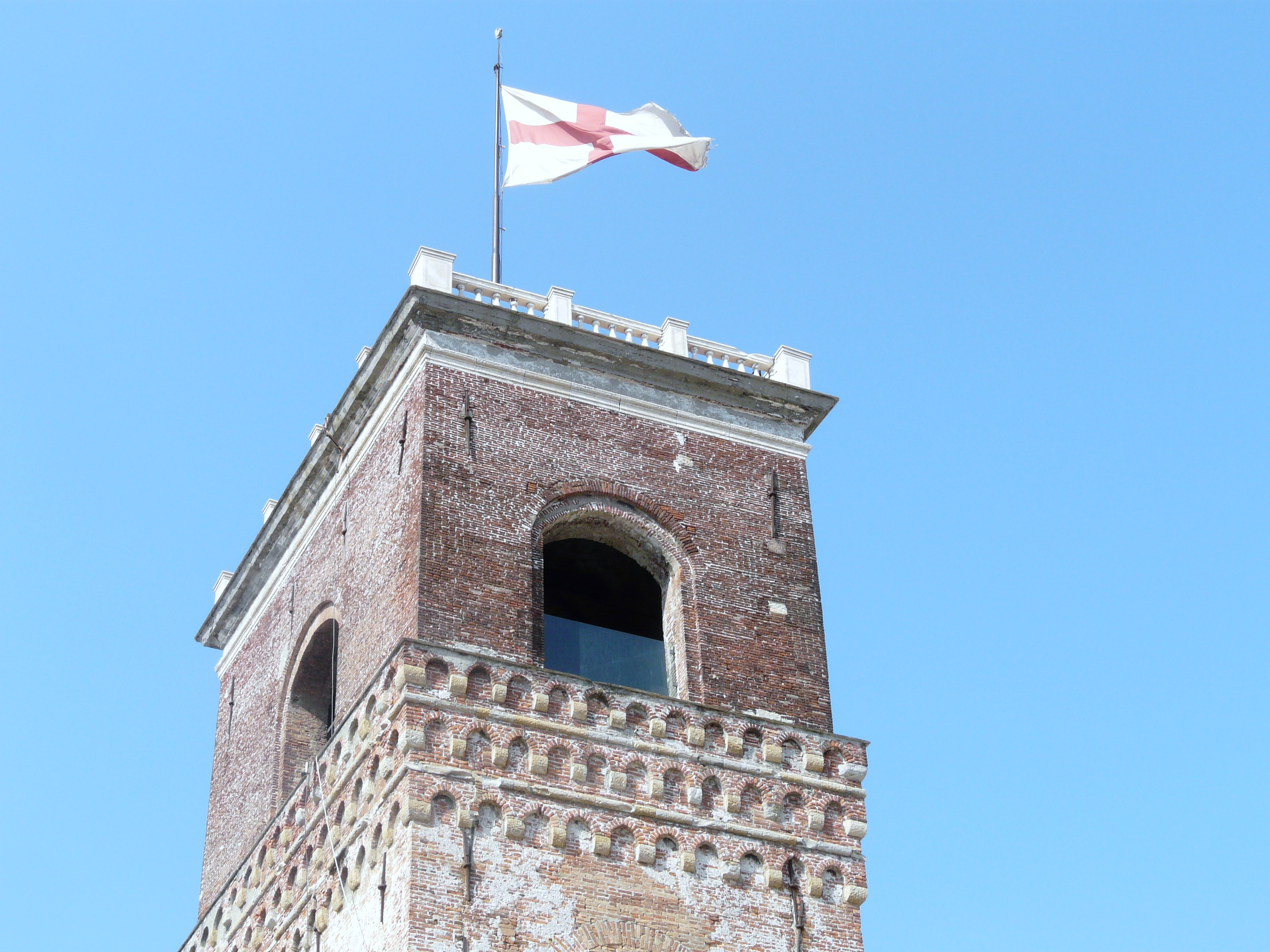
The top of the Grimaldina tower

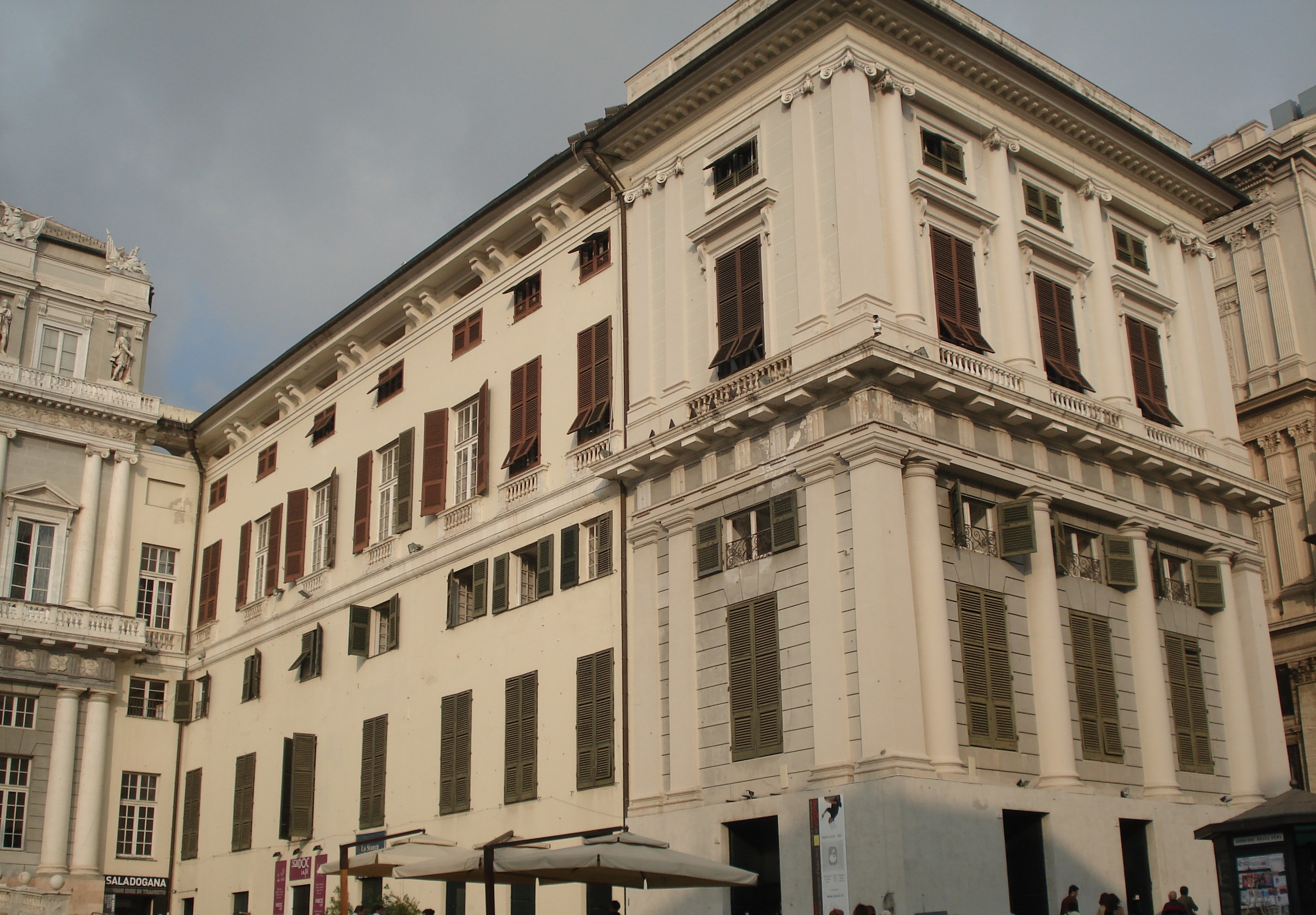
The east wing of the palace

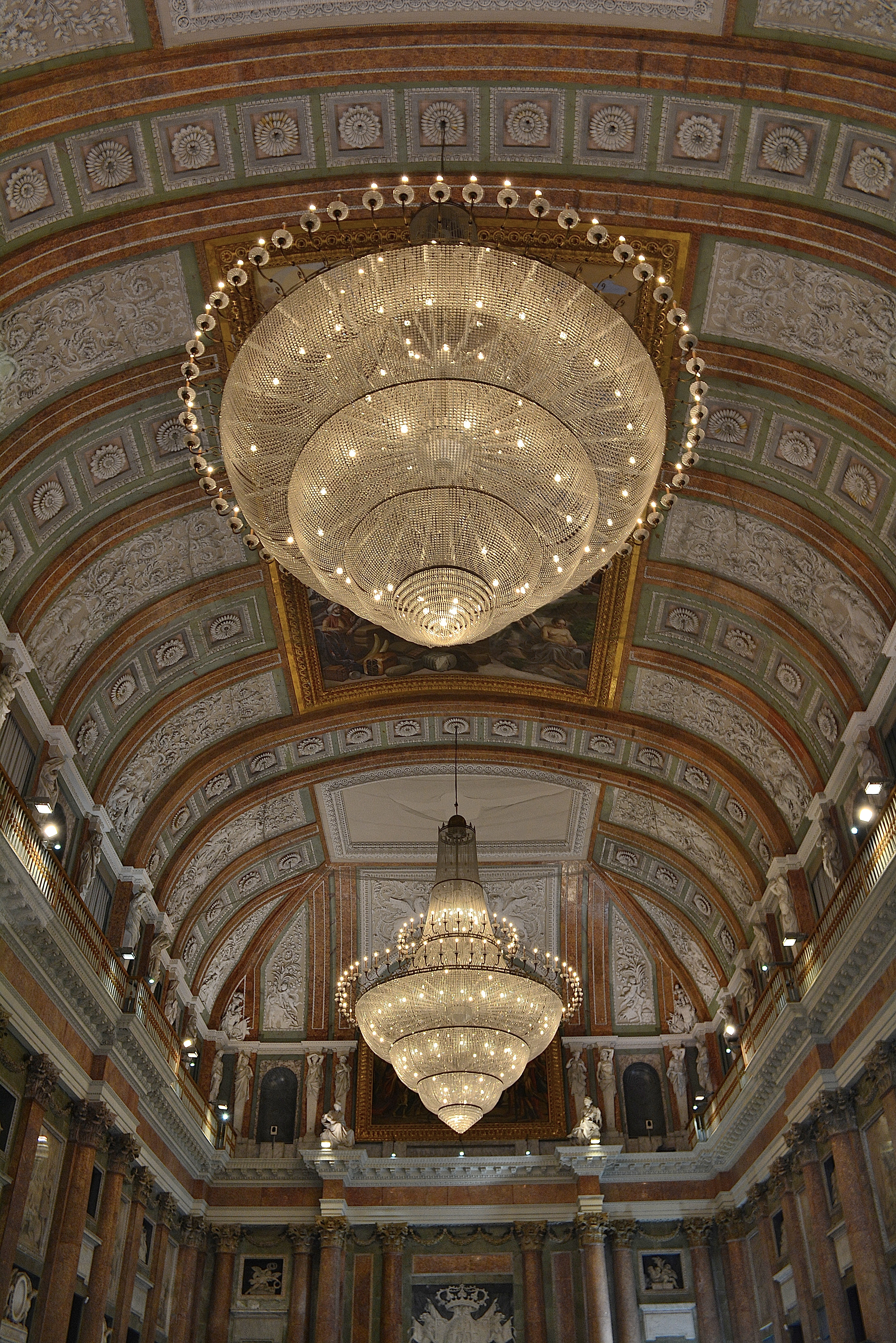
The vault of the hall of the Great Council

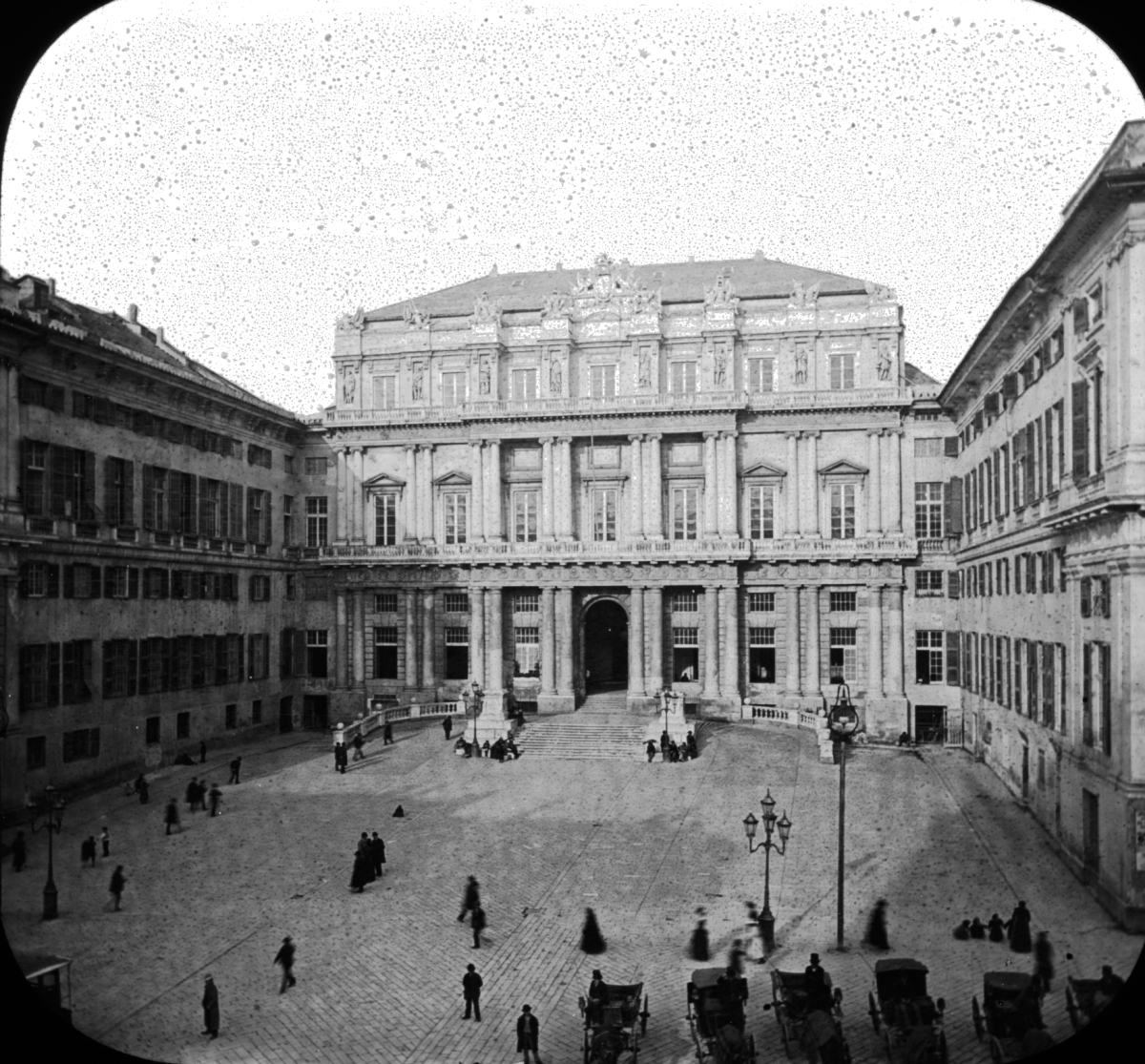
Palazzo Ducale, Genoa, Italy. Brooklyn Museum Archives, Goodyear Archival Collection

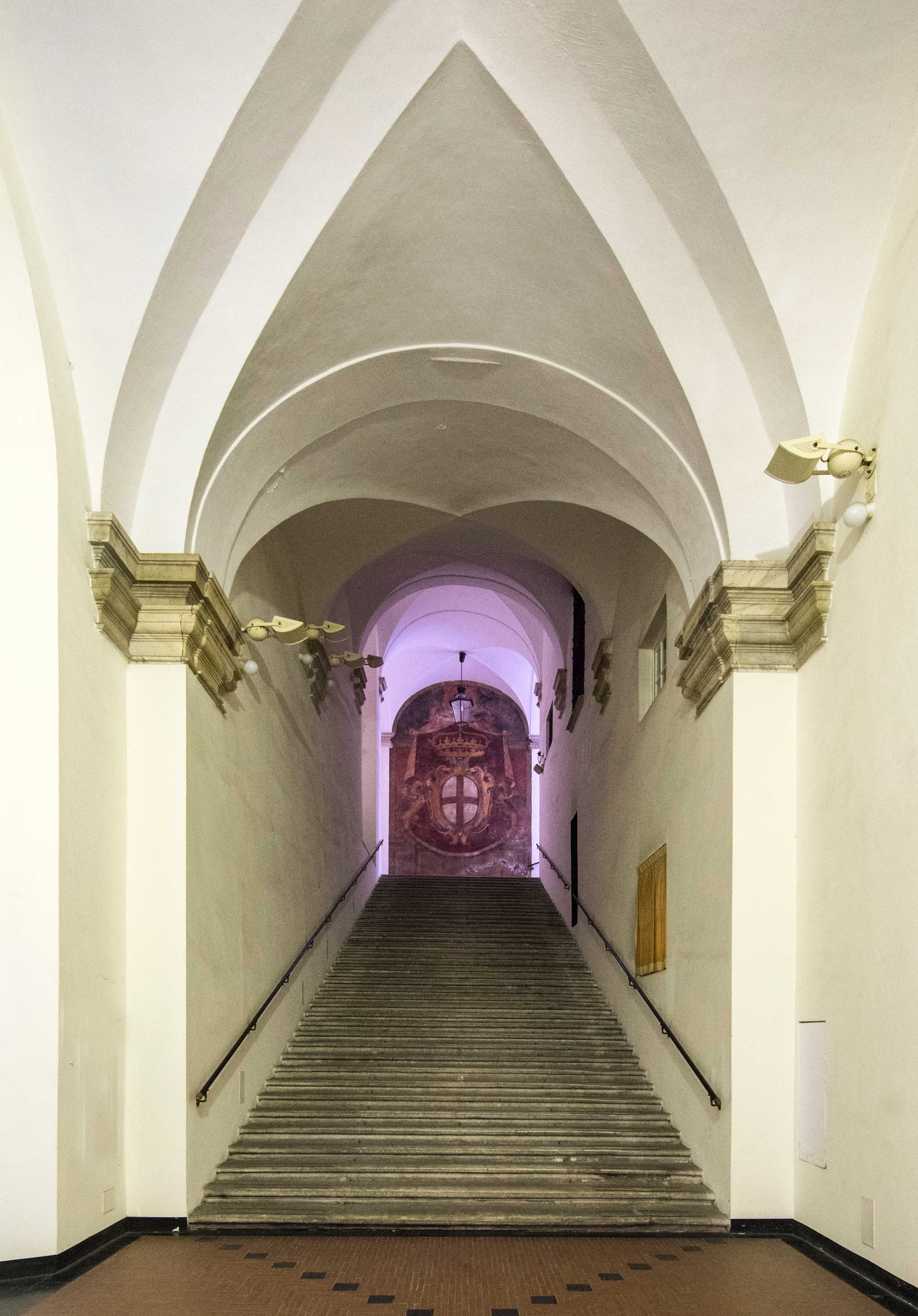
The staircase with the coat of arms of the Republic of Genoa.

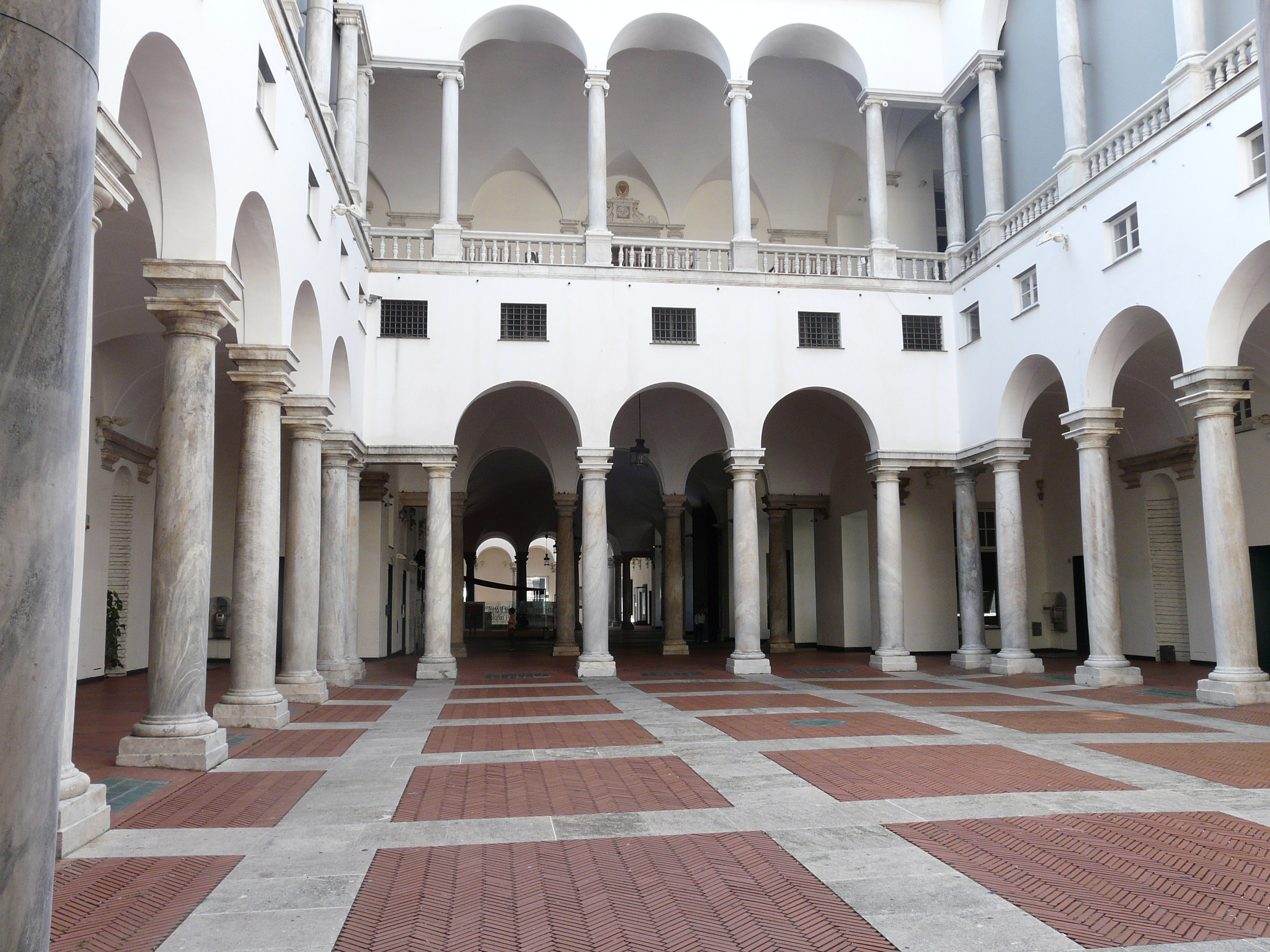
The main courtyard
