= Great Council and Minor Council of Genoa =

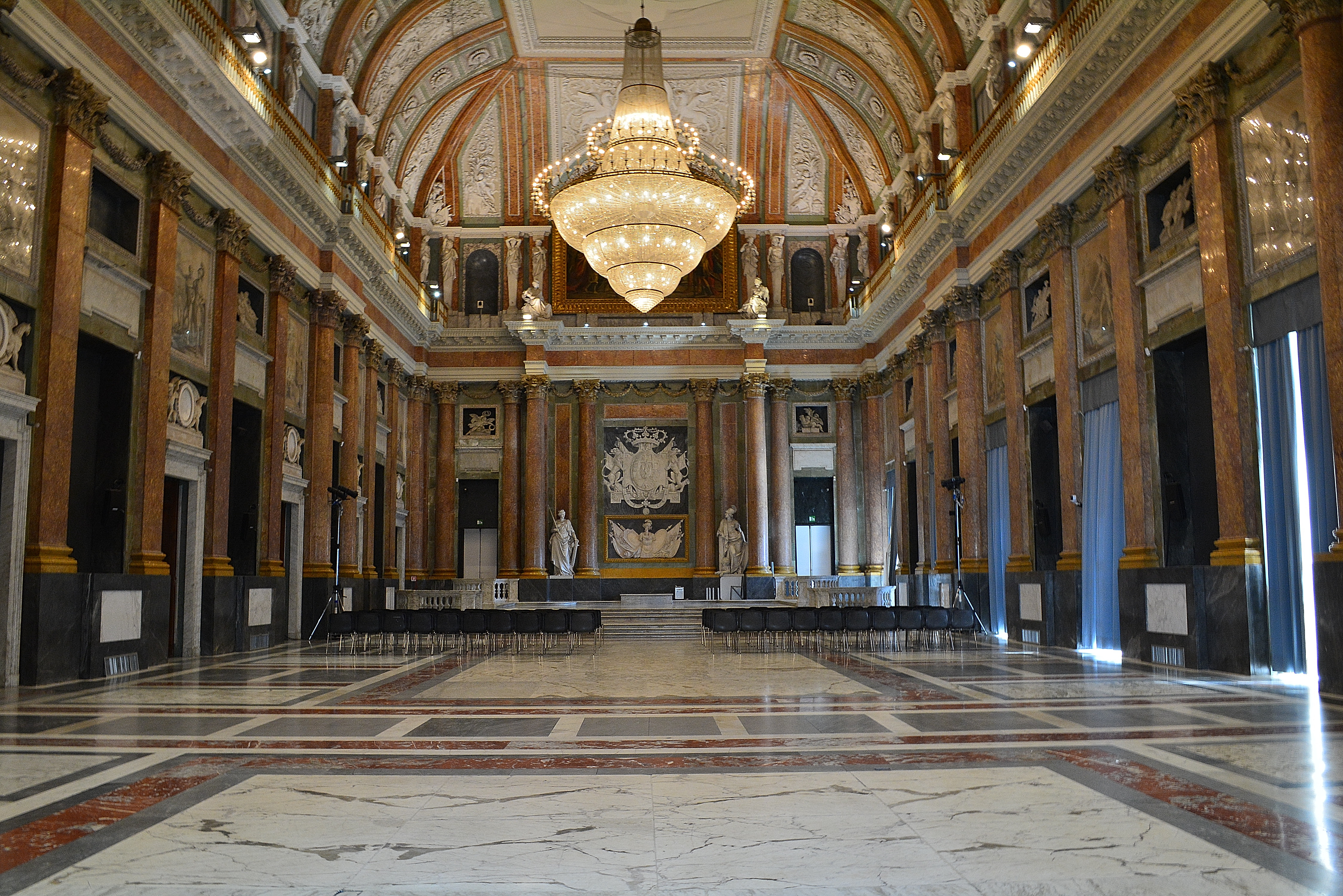
Hall of the Great Council in the Doge's Palace, Genoa.

The Great Council and Minor Council were the two chambers of the political system of the Republic of Genoa that elected the Doge from 1528 to 1797.

== History ==
In 1528, the Genoese Admiral Andrea Doria reformed the constitution of the Republic of Genoa. Before 1528, there was a closed circle of three institutions that kept each other in balance: a Doge elected for life, a Senate of eight senators, and the College of Prosecutors. The College of Prosecutors was a group of attorneys and governors; these were respectively concerned with finances and the administration of justice. With Doria's reformation, this form of government was replaced by the Great Council and the Minor Council, and the doge's term of office was shortened from life to two years. The reformation ended the closed circle of aristocratic families of doges, that ruled the Republic for centuries. The Great Council and Minor Council lasted until 1797, when the Genoese Republic was conquered by Napoleon.

== Great Council ==
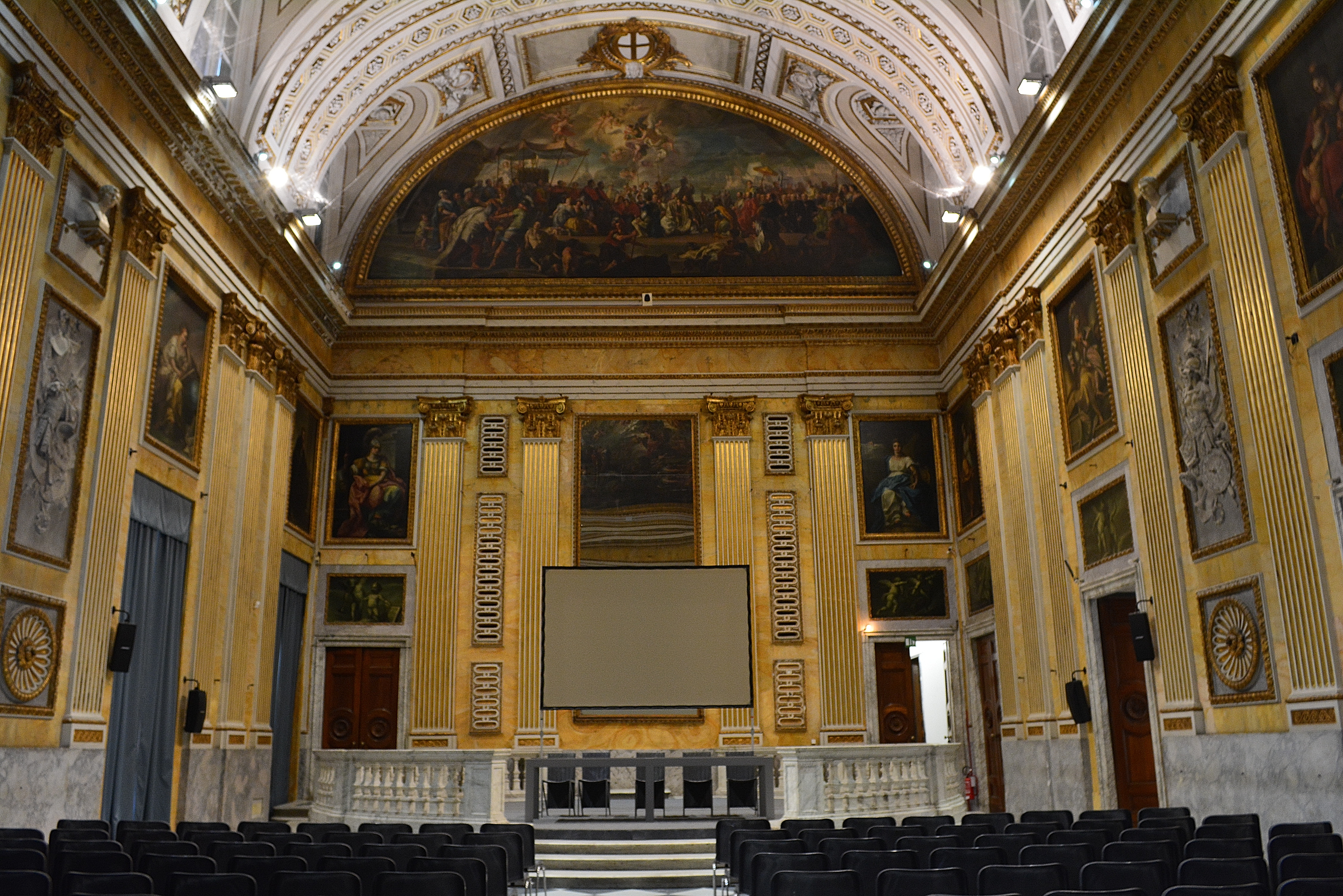
Room of the Minor Council in the Doge's Palace.

The Great Council was made up of 400 influential people from the Republic, not necessarily of the nobility. Most of them were bankers, cloth merchants, captains, doctors, magistrates, notaries and scholars. 300 of them were selected from hundreds of names by the Great Council, while the last 100 were selected by the Minor Council.

== Minor Council ==
The Minor Council consisted of a dozen nobles. They appointed each other. The Senate and the College of Prosecutors had to work with the Minor Council on any legislation; without the agreement of one of them, no new laws were introduced. These three institutions were also jointly responsible for warfare, the making of international treaties and alliances. The Doge was bound by what the three institutions agreed.

== Election of the Doge ==
The main authority of the Grand Council and Minor Council was to elect the Doge every 2 years. This importance was reflected in the fact that both electoral colleges met in the Doge's Palace. The Great Council drew up a list of candidates. The list went to the Minor Council, which selected a few candidates. The Minor Council sent its list to the Great Council for the final round of voting. Member after member in the Grand Council stood up and voted until a majority was found around one candidate, finally electing the new Doge of the Republic.

== See also ==
- Republic of Genoa
- Genoa
- Doge of Genoa
- Doge's Palace, Genoa
