= Delle Piane family =

Genoese noble family

Delle Piane
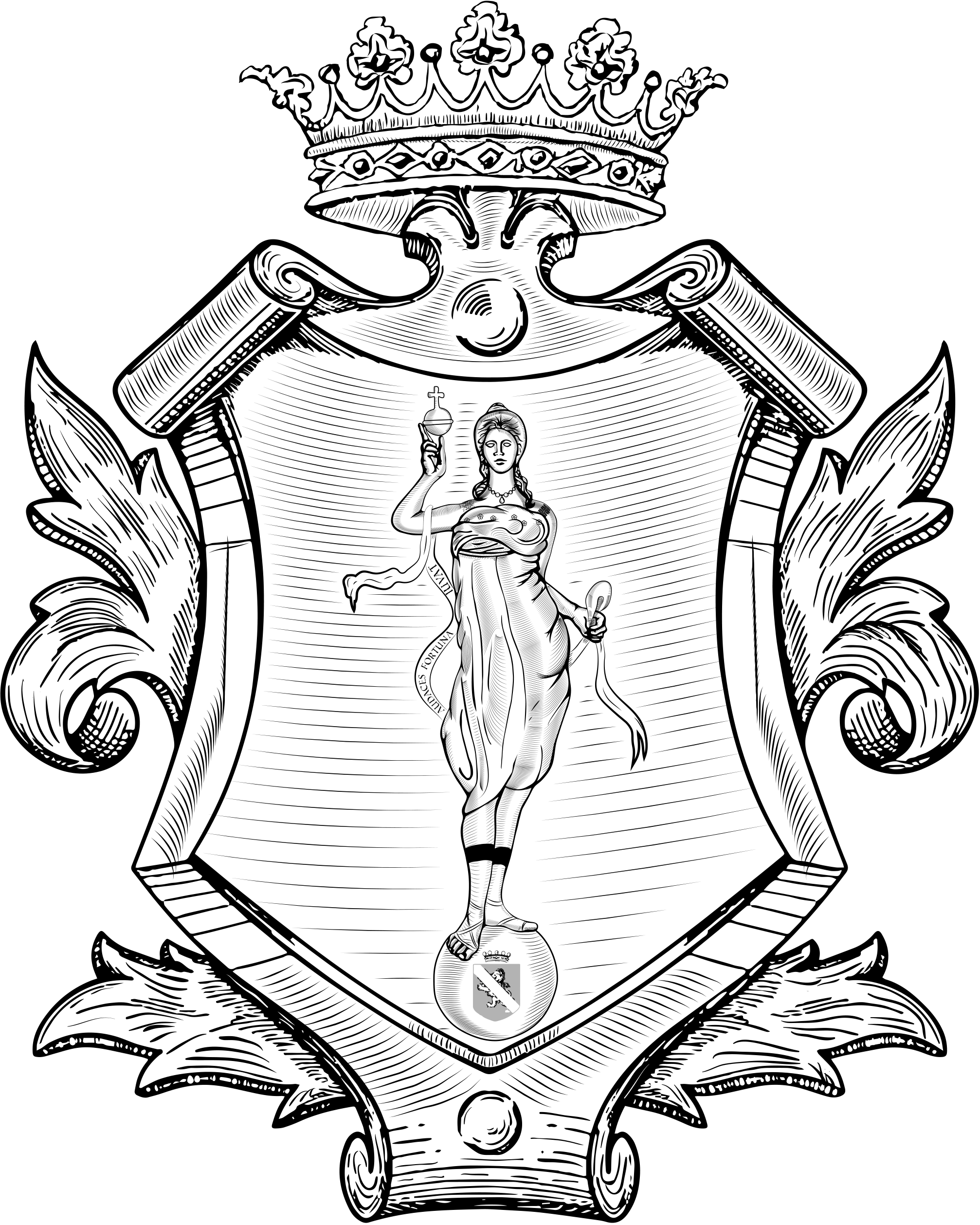
- of blue to the figure of the goddess fortune with a sail, on a silver globe.
- Country: Republic of Genoa
- Founded: 12th century
- Founder: Oberto de Planis
- Historic seat: Polcevera
- Titles: Nobile; Patrician of Genoa
- Motto: AUDACES FORTUNA IUVAT (fortune favors the bold)
- Estate: Palazzo Delle Piane
- Cadet branches: Patrician line (extinct)

The Delle Piane family is an old Genoese noble family first recorded in Polcevera in 1121. Over the past ten centuries it has produced many distinguished government officials, clerics, diplomats, soldiers and patrons.

The members of the house were part of the Genoese patrician class and of the ruling orders in Genoa and its dominions in the various institutional set-ups that succeeded one another over the centuries.

First, they became part of the civic nobility that played a leading role in the fortunes of the Commune of Genoa and in the creation of a "colonial empire" based on monopolies and trading bases dotted all over the Mediterranean and in the Black Sea. Formerly supporters of the Ghibelline faction, the Delle Piane family held government posts reserved for its political faction and engaged in trade and international finance in the Mediterranean and Europe.

Later, when constitutional reforms in 1528 gave rise to the aristocratic Republic of Genoa and the ancient factions were formally abolished, the Delle Piane family were included in the Liber Nobilitatis. From then, generation after generation through to the fall of the Republic, they were part of a "sovereign aristocracy" occupying positions at the top levels of economic and political power.

The most eminent branch of the family, which originated in Polcevera, still flourishes today, and continues to produce prominent entrepreneurs both in the socioeconomic life of Genoa and in a broader international context. In 2022, the Delle Piane family sold Rimorchiatori Mediterranei, the world's second-largest maritime towing companies, to MSC Group for €1 billion.

== Medieval origins ==
The Delle Piane surname derives from a place called Planum in the Ceranesi area, attested in the diocesan curia of Morego, later called Chianne and subsequently Piane di Polcevera in the medieval vernacular, and from Campum Planum, east of the city of Genoa.

Cited in medieval documents as de Plano, de Campo Plano and de Planis, the members of the family had allodial and emphyteutic holdings in the three podestà jurisdictions outside the city walls – those of Voltri, Polcevera and Bisagno. Multiple family members occupied consular posts from 1197 onwards.

As early as the 12th century there is mention of the Delle Piane family with regard to the rural Vassalage of the Bishop of Genoa, to whom they paid land tax, and around whom they gravitated. Oberto and Fulco de Planis de Pulcifera are recorded in 1254 in official deeds of the curia and documents dating to 1255 attest to their presence alongside Archbishop Gualtiero. In the same period, they received land in Polcevera in emphyteusis from the Order of Malta.

The genealogists recognize Oberto as the founder of the Polcevera line. The first member to hold significant posts in the government of the Republic was Oberto's son, Matteo, who is cited in official documents relating to the foundation of the church of San Nicolosio in Genoa (1305).

Various historic documents between the 12th and 13th centuries reveal that many members of the family held public office or devoted themselves to an ecclesiastical or military career, while for a long time also engaging in mercantile activities. Many are also cited as being overseas in the 13th–14th centuries: Ottolino (1277) a Laiazzo, an important port in the Armenian Kingdom of Cilicia; Matteo (1298) an official in Gazaria, a Genoese colony in the Crimea, and in Bonifacio in Corsica, etc.

== The age of the lifetime Doges ==
From 1339, the year in which Simone Boccanegra took power and was proclaimed the first lifetime Doge of Genoa and its dominions, the emerging populares faction acquired a predominant public role, occupying the majority of government posts and reserving the office of doge for its representatives alone. For this reason, many members of the family served on the Magnificent Council of Elders, the leading government magistracy flanking the doges or, during periods of foreign rule, the royal or ducal governors.

The descendant of Oberto I, known as Obertaccio, was Oberto II, who served on the Council of Elders for three consecutive mandates (1374–1404). He was then elected Knight of the Doge together with Giuliano di Savignone; he then became commander of the army defending the ducal palace, where he resided permanently by virtue of his thirty-year mandate.

Dominus Dux lanuensium etc., et Consilium Antianorum, volentes procedere ad ellectionem faciendam de duobus probis millitum prefati Domini Ducis pro anno futuro, confisi si quidem de sufficentia et probitate Iuliani de Savignone et Obercacii de Planis de Pulcifera, ipsos et utrumque ipsorum ellegerunt et constituerunt in millites et pro millitibus dicti Domini Ducis pro anno uno proximo venturo in Kalendis mensis presentis Iulii inchoato

During military operations against Bernabò and Galeazzo Visconti, Obertaccio was taken prisoner near Rossiglione and ransomed by his brother, who obtained a loan from Gabriele Pallavicino and Adamo Spinola.

Between the 14th and 16th centuries, the members of the family did not just hold prominent posts in the government of the Republic, and in the upper echelons of the military, but also continued trading and entrepreneurial activities, both in the dominions and overseas. Oberto, who had close ties with Doge Antoniotto Adorno, handled Genoa's diplomatic relations with the Duke of Orleans in 1394 in relation to the Convention of Savona. Later he agreed to cede some Genoese territories near Constantinople to the Turks, who had effectively already taken control of them.

Other members of the family, like Giacobo and Raimondo, forged ties with the Spain of John II of Aragon at the dawn of the 15th century. Antonio, during the French governorship of marshal Jean II Le Meingre, was elected Abbot of the People of the Podesteria of Voltri (1404), an important post that entailed, among other things, making representations on the Podesteria's behalf to the central government, and guaranteeing the security and allegiance of the area. He was summoned by Adorno regarding the refusal of the Duke of Milan to negotiate on the sovereignty of Genoa. Soon afterwards, in front of his brothers Battista, Pantaleo, Giacomo, Andrea, Pietro and Leonardo, he swore allegiance to the heir of the duke of Milan, Gian Galeazzo Sforza.

It is well known that the Genoese noble families were accustomed to band together in Alberghi dei Nobili, private family groupings of noble blood that were, however, recognised by the law. Similar to clans, the members were united by common political and economic interests and used their cohesion to exert greater influence in public life and in the main trading bases. During the 15th century, in a Genoa wracked by increasingly bitter factional conflict, the family under Antonio banded together with other aristocratic and old Genoese families to form the Albergo degli Honesti (1378).

== The aristocratic Republic of Genoa ==
In 1528 Andrea Doria completed institutional reforms that led to the founding of the aristocratic Republic of Genoa. Twenty-eight new alberghi (sing. albergo; family groupings inspired by the medieval ones, but in this case established by the government) were set up, and the members of the Genoese nobility included in the Liber Nobilitatis, the only people with the right to hold government office up to and including the post of doge, were distributed among them.

Many members of the Delle Piane family were counted as nobility, with some of them grouped in the De Franchi albergo and others in the Cybo albergo. In accordance with ancient custom, the Cybo coat of arms was carved onto the shrine of St Paul in the church of Santa Maria di Castello (which is on the historic Salita Santa Caterina di Luccoli, in the ancient centre of Genoa). The many tombs of family nobility that can be found in various Ligurian churches date to the 16th and 17th centuries.

With the enactment, in 1576, of the Republic of Genoa's final legislative reform, the Great Council and Minor Council of Genoa (Leges Nova), the "artificial" alberghi of 1528 were abolished, but the Delle Piane family retained a prominent position, and its members continued the family's long military, diplomatic, ecclesiastical and commercial traditions.

Many important figures emerged in these fields between the 17th and 18th centuries, often engaged in forging alliances with other Genoese aristocratic families, but sometimes in the service of European monarchs as well. Jacopo was proconsul to the Republic of Livorno (1632); Oberto was active in the Kingdom of Naples and is documented, together with Amerigo, alongside the Pallavicino and Durazzo families; Giovanni Andrea was active in Lisbon, orbiting alongside the Pallavicino (1727), while Giovanni Batta can be placed alongside the Sauli (1731) family. Giovanii Maria orbited first around the court of the Farnese dukes of Parma, and then the Spanish court of Philip V, and finally the court of King Charles of Naples.

== From the Kingdom of Sardinia to the Kingdom of Italy ==
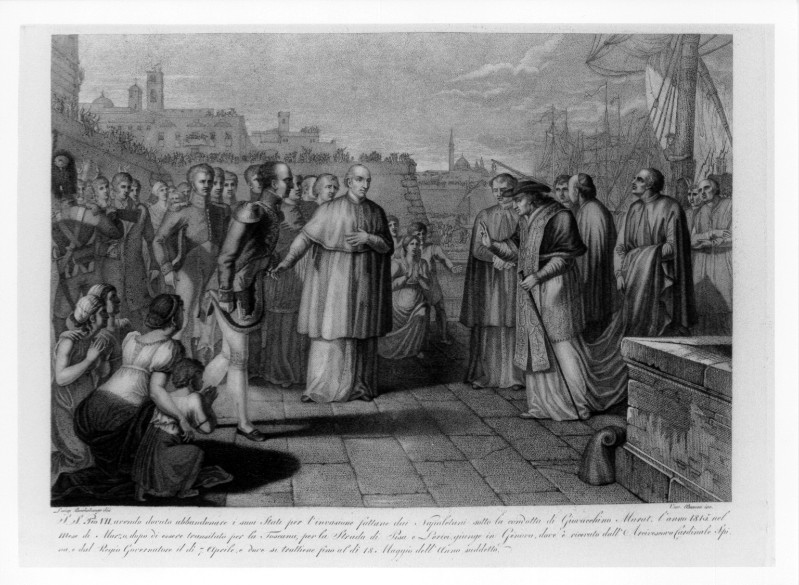
Benucci V. (1815–1820), Arrival of Pope Pius VII in Genoa welcomed by Genovese patricians

The social structure of the Republic of Genoa, definitively established by the Leges Novae enacted in 1576 following the civil war between "old" and "new" nobility in 1575 – the final resurgence of centuries of factional strife which, in the city and even more so on the Riviera and inland, had long survived the reform of 1528 – lasted until 1797. The ancien regime then collapsed in Genoa as well, due to revolutionary uprisings stemming from Republican France. The period that followed the brief revolutionary phase, during which Genoa and Liguria were ruled in quick succession by various forms of government – the Ligurian Republic (1797–1804), the French Empire (1805–1814), the re-established Genoese Republic (1814–1815) and annexation to the Kingdom of Sardinia (1815) – offered families like that of the Delle Piane many opportunities to play an important role.

There were many prominent figures in this troubled historic period, and the Delle Piane family also had many palaces and villas in this age. Antonio, who officially received Victor Emanuel I, king of Sardinia, in 1814 and then Pope Pius VII in 1815, both on visits to Genoa, possessed the monumental complex, abbey, monastery and adjoining lands of San Nicolò del Boschetto in Rivarolo; the neighbouring Palazzo Cattaneo Delle Piane, built in the 16th century, surrounded by vast lands; and the Palazzo Veneroso in Genoa.

The most illustrious branch of the family, who for centuries resided at San Cipriano, had already established themselves at Novi Ligure by the time of the collapse of the ancien regime. For centuries Novi had been the "capital" of the Genoese Oltregiogo, was the seat of the governorship and a lively economic and social hub.

When Liguria was annexed to the Kingdom of Sardinia, the members of the family were ready to grasp the opportunities that the backing of a modern, expanding state could offer to the old nobility. They continued to live in part in Novi, where the family owned some of the most prestigious palaces that still characterise the historic centre of Novi (including the Palazzo Delle Piane and Villa Delle Piane, formerly Brignole-Sale), and continued to be active in the textile industry; and in part in Genoa, where they participated in the entrepreneurial and financial activities favoured by the House of Savoy and which led to an economic revival that played an important role in the Unification of Italy.

== Ten centuries of civic aristocracy, patriciate and landed nobility ==
For centuries the Delle Piane family were members of the medieval civic nobility, of the landed lords typical of ecclesiastical vassalage, and subsequently of the sovereign aristocracy of Genoa.

As members of the Genoese patriciate, the family had the right to the title of Magnifico ("Magnificent"), the only one permitted by the law within the Republic of Genoa. Although outside Genoa's dominions or at foreign royal courts Genoese noblemen were treated as equivalent to the rank of Marquess, they continued to proudly use the title of Magnifico Patrizio Genovese.

To honor figures of particular distinction, the Republic granted to some members of the family the honorary privilege of tecto capite, with a treatment similar to that reserved for Genoese aristocrats in the Liber Nobilitatis, including the title of "Magnifico", but without the right and duty to hold public posts and the hereditariness of such rights: a fairly rare nobility ad personam.

The coronation of Gian Francesco I Brignole as Doge of Genoa and first king of Corsica marked the transformation of the rank of all Genoese patrician aristocrats: as they were potential successors of an absolute sovereign, every Genoese patrician acquired the same rank as a hereditary prince or Prince du sang (‘Prince of blood’) in European courts.

The transition of the aristocratic Republic to the Ligurian Republic following the Italian campaigns of the French Revolutionary Wars marked the end of sovereign aristocracy (1797). With the annexation to the Kingdom of Sardinia, the use of the title of "Magnifico" was suppressed, though "Marquess" was tolerated as a courtesy title, by custom if nothing else. After heated debate between 1888 and 1890, the Consulta Araldica (College of Arms) decreed such title not to be granted ex officio to all Genovese patricians but had to be granted by the King ad personam. As the family never bothered with this bureaucratic procedure, the family is now inscribed in the Libro d’Oro della Nobiltà Italiana (the official Golden Book of Italian Nobility) of with the title of Nobile ("Noble"), applicable to all members of the house, male and female.

=== Heraldry ===
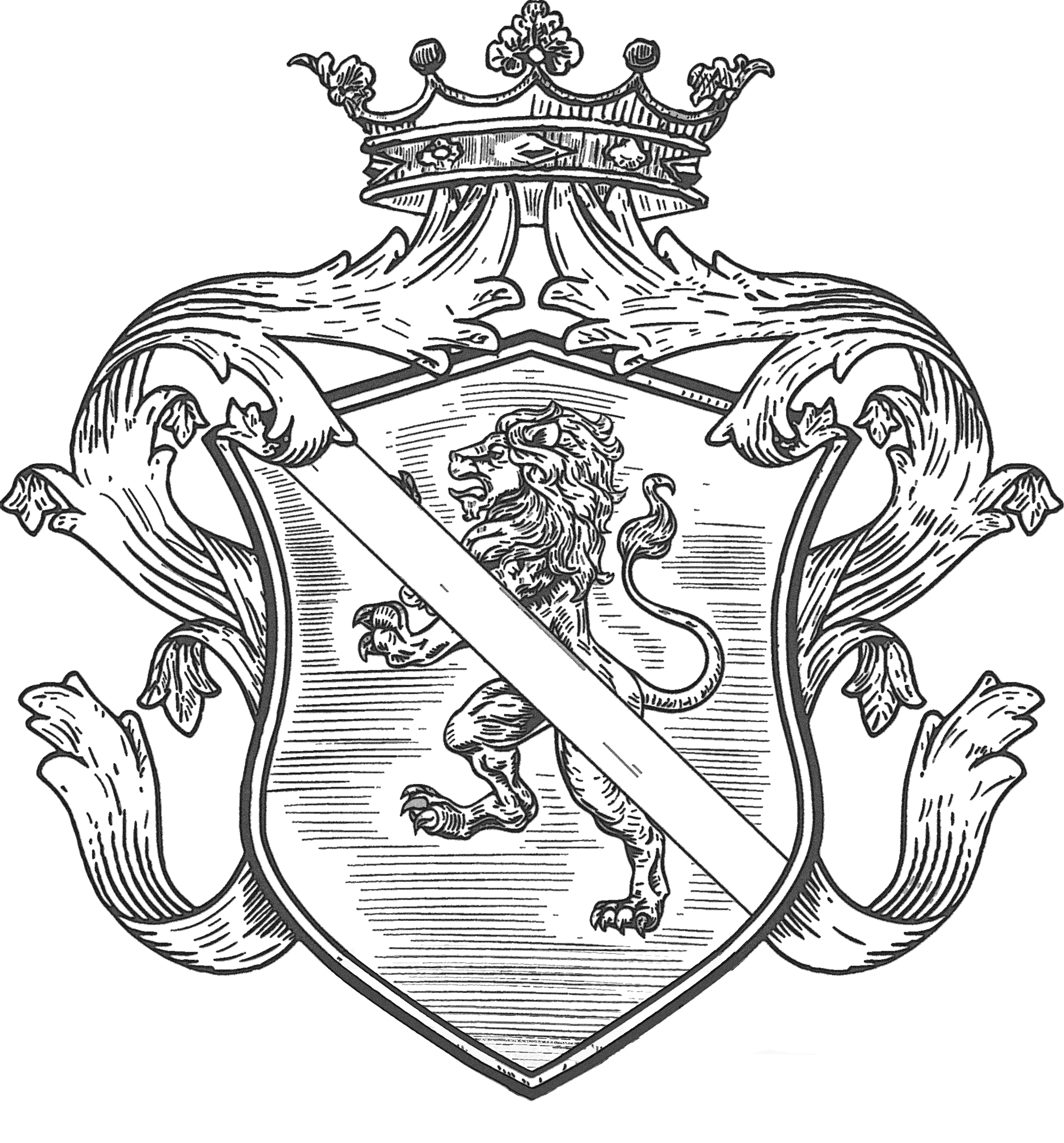
Linea di Polcevera

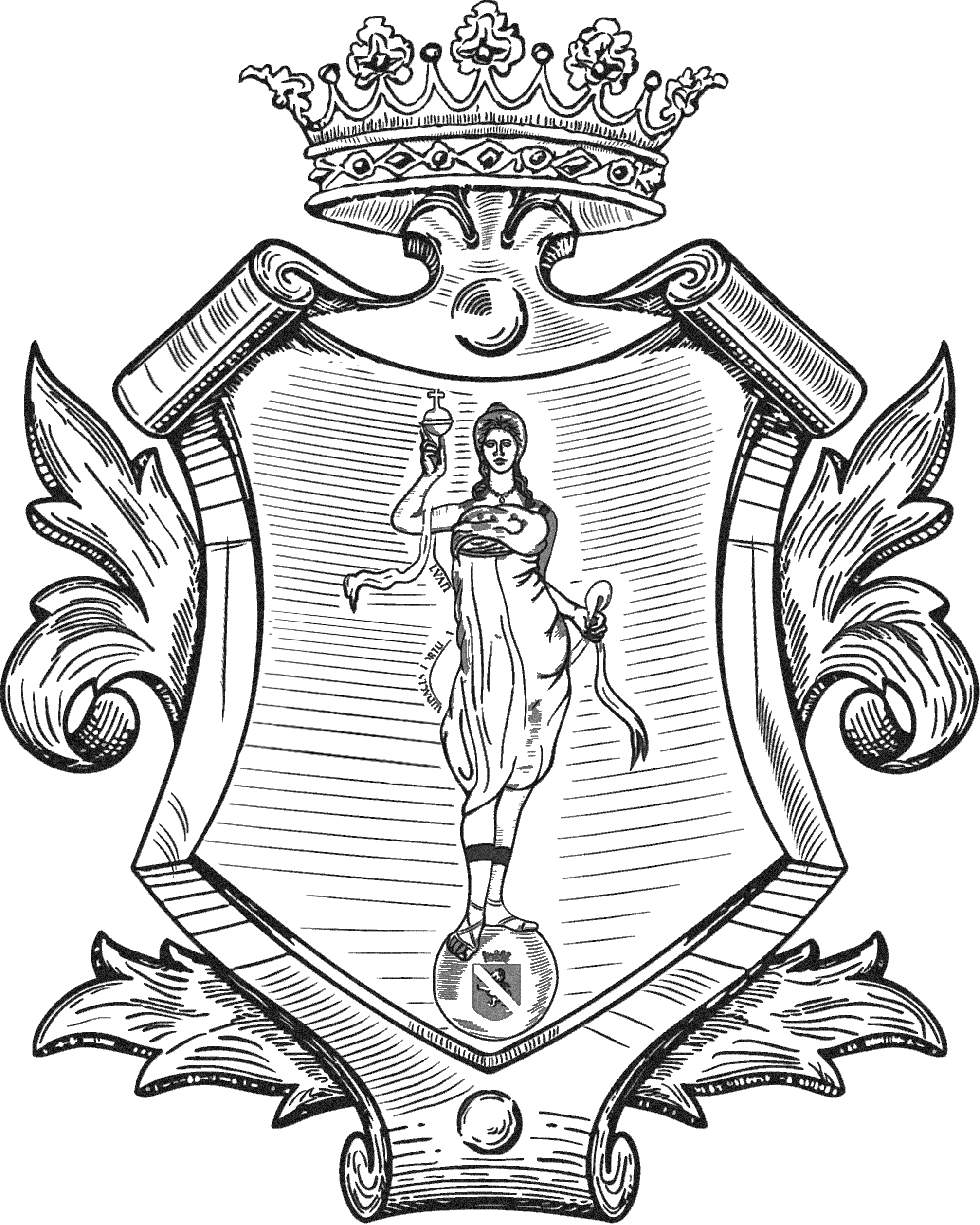
Linea Patrizia

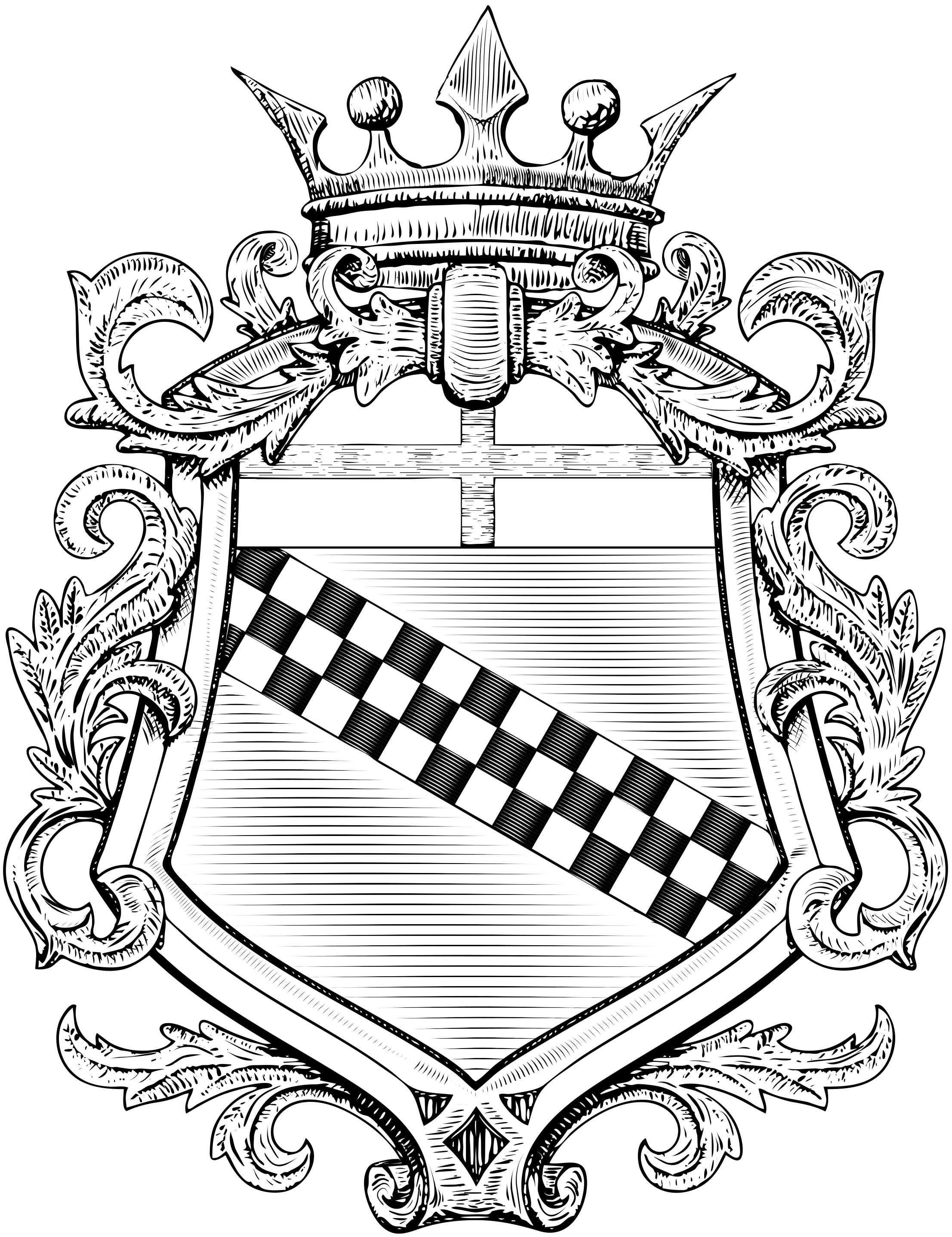
Cybo - Delle Piane

== Historical buildings ==
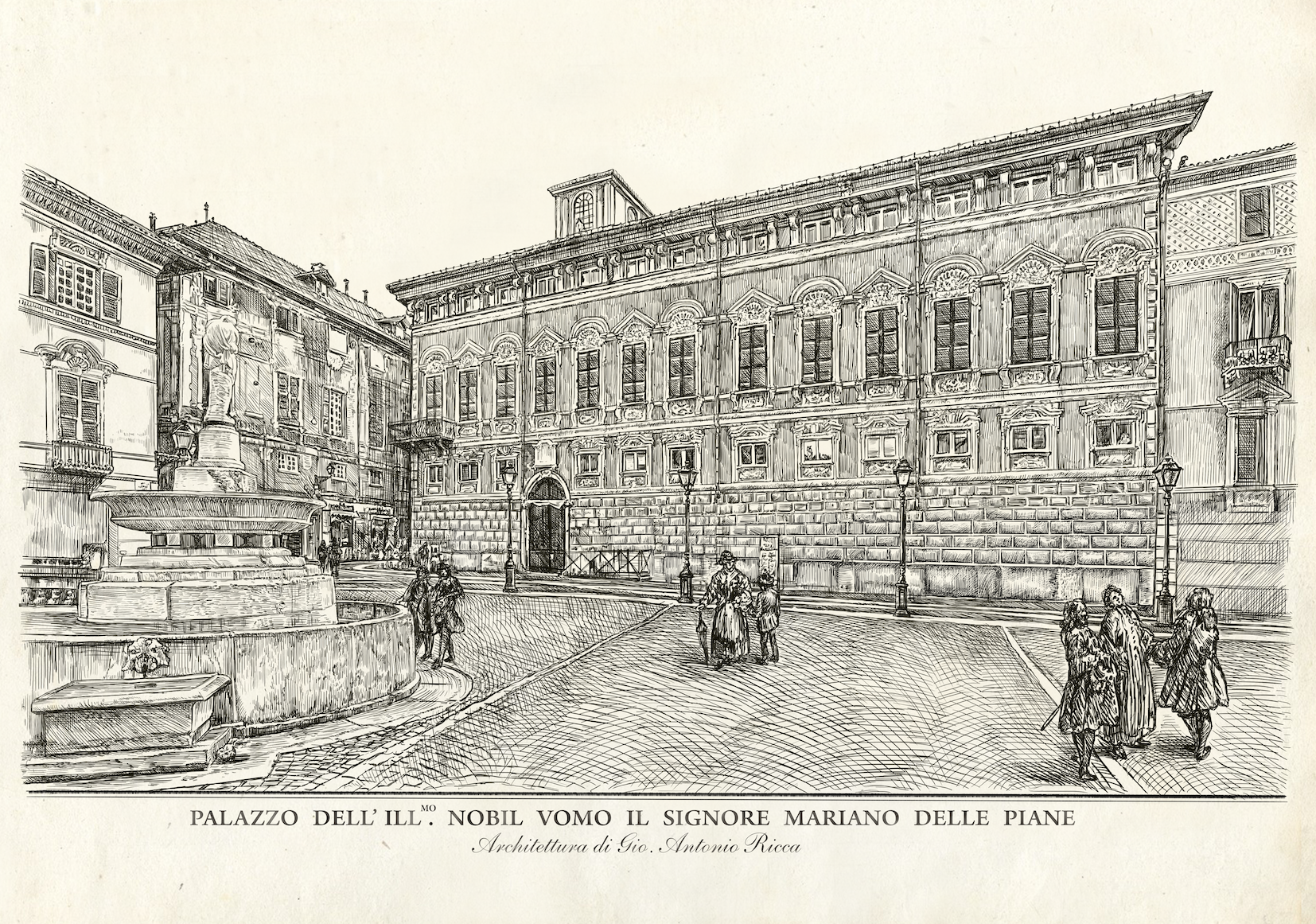
Palazzo Delle Piane, lithograph, 20th century

- Castle of Corvara, 11th century (La Spezia)
- Castle of Pornassio and of the Valle Arroscia, 13th century (Imperia)
- Palazzo Delle Piane, 17th century (Piazza Delle Piane, Novi Ligure)
- Palazzotto Delle Piane, 18th century (Genova)
- Palazzo Balbi Delle Piane, 16th century (Val Polcevera, Genova)
- Villa Cattaneo Delle Piane dell’Olmo, 17th century (Val Polcevera, Genova)
- Villa Delle Piane al Boschetto, 17th century (Val Polcevera, Genova)
- Villa Delle Piane, formerly Brignole-Sale, 18th century (Novi Ligure)
- Palazzo Delle Piane, 20th century (Savona)

== Notable members ==
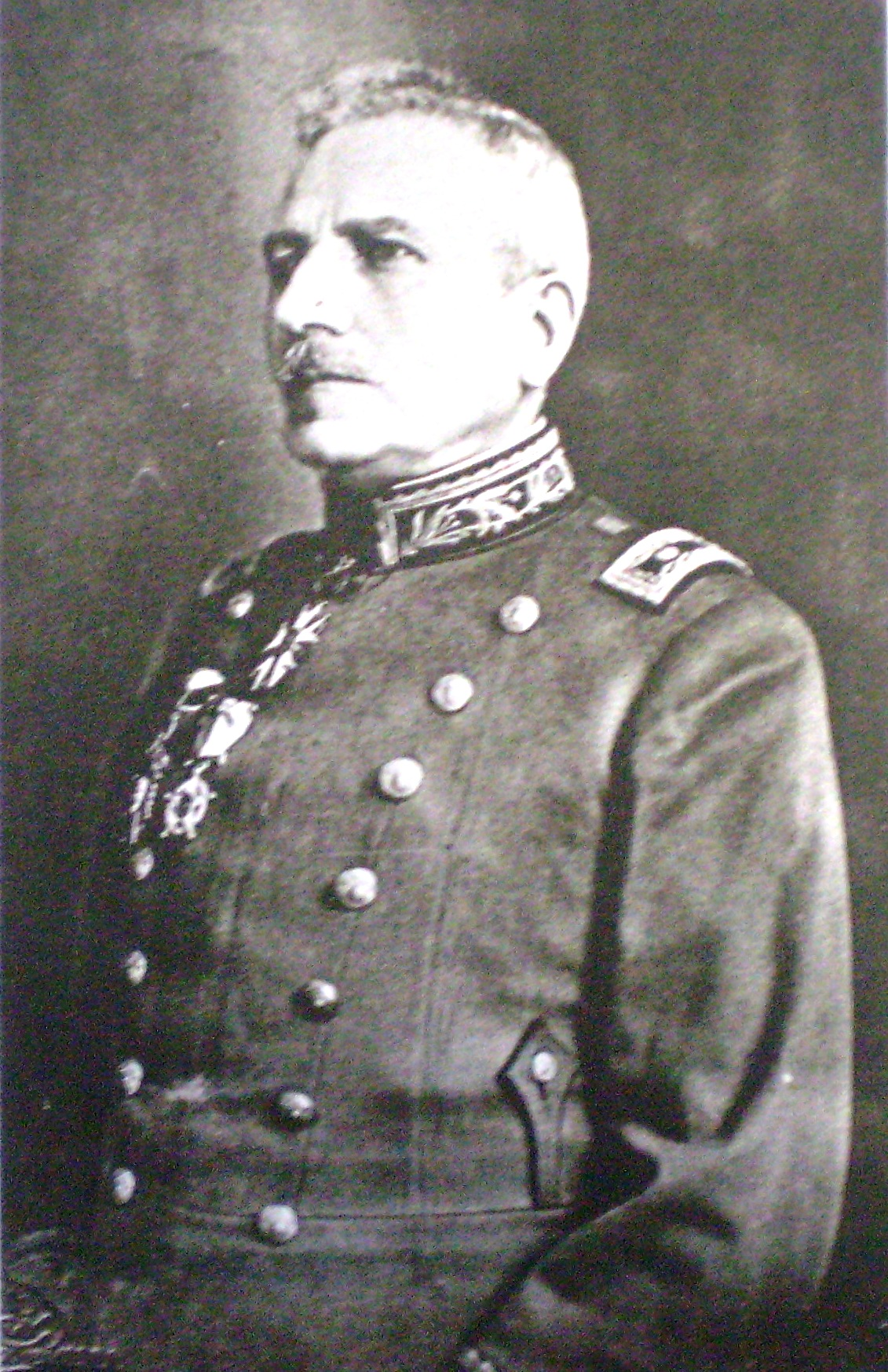
Luigi Giuseppe delle Piane

- Fulco (12th century), Consul of the Comune di Genova (1197, 1217)
- Lanfranco (12th century), Consul of the Comune di Genova (1198)
- Baldovino (13th century), Consul of the Comune di Genova (1203)
- Obertaccio (14th century), Elder of the Comune di Genova (1374–1394). Commander of armies of Doge Nicolo Guarco nel 1380
- Giovanni (13th century), Elder of the Comune di Genova (1362), took part together with the Grimaldi in the battle against the galleys of Luciano Imperiale
- Nicolò (14th century), lord of the castle of Pornassio in 1343 together with his son Antonio, commander of a band of Genoese crossbowmen
- Giacobo (14th century), Elder of the Comune of Genoa (1382)
- Antonio (15th century), Elder of the Comune of Genoa (1401). Abate del Popolo of Sestri, Pegli, Arenzano and Voltri (1404)
- Gio. Maria (1756–1836), commander of Ferdinand I, Duke of Parma; he fought and defeated the soldiers of Louis Antoine, Duke of Angoulême
- Giovanni Battista (1889–1961), Archbishop and Apostolic Nuncio of Austria
- Luigi Giuseppe (1865–1941), General Commander and War Minister
- Mariano (1844–1916), industrialist and philanthropist, whose son of Francesco (1881–1953) was a senator in the Kingdom of Italy in 1913
- Giovanni (1937–), industrialist and shipowner

== Ancient Line of Polcevera ==
Obertaccio
Oberto	Giannino	Giacobo	Nicolo
Francesco	Ugolino	Antonio
Benedetto	Bartolomeo	Carlotto	Adamo
Gio. Batta	Nicola	Carlo	Giacomo
Pantaleone	Battista	Agostino	Agabito
Carlotto	Benedetto	Niccolo
Stefano
Antonio
Gio. Batta	Gio. Antonio	Gio. Ambrogio
Francesco	Agostino	Oberto
Francesco	Stefano	Cipriano	Gio. Batta
Gio. Batta	Antonio
Antonio	Agostino
Giuseppe Maria	Agostino
Francesco	Luigi Antonio
Mariano	Agostino
Francesco; Linea Primogenita	Gio. Batta; Ramo di Novi	Giuseppe; Ramo di Genova
Gustavo	Mariano
Giuseppe	Francesco
Mariano
Marco
Edoardo

== Bibliography ==
- Annuario della Nobiltà Italiana, (Yearbook of Nobility), (edizione 28, 2 volumi) and (edizione 30, Volume 3), a cura di Giovan Battista Crollalanza, presentato a Palazzo Lascaris con il Principe Amedeo di Savoia.
- Il Libro d'Oro della Nobiltà Italiana di Genova (Edizione 1990–94, volume II, parte II), a cura del Collegio Araldico di Roma.
- Guelfo Guelfi Camaiani, Il Liber Nobilitatis Genuensis e il Governo della Repubblica di Genova fino all'anno 1797, Firenze, 1965, pag. 405.
- L'Araldica a Genova, Origini e Significativi di una realtà storica e sociale, Liguria, edizione Sabatelli 1983, a cura di Gian Francesco Bernabò di Negro.
- Dizionario Storico-blasonico delle famiglie nobili e notabili, Vol.3, 1886–1890, G.B. di Crollalanza.
- Mons. Giovanni Delle Piane (Un insigne Genovese nella diplomazia pontificia), a cura di Giuseppe Parodi Domenichi di Parodi
- Il Novese: La galleria Liberty di Palazzo Delle Piane di Novi Ligure, a cura di Beppe Merlano.
- Fondazione Casa America, Dizionario storico biografico dei liguri in America Latina da Colombo a tutto il Novecento, Volume 1, pag. 189, 190, 191.
